= Sir Thomas Bellot, 3rd Baronet =

British politician

Member of Parliament for Newcastle-under-Lyme
- In office 1706-1707; 1708-1709

Personal details
- Born: 1679
- Died: January 1709 (aged 29–30)
- Party: Tory
- Parent: Sir Thomas Bellot (father)
- Relatives: Christopher Packe (grandfather)
- Education: Trinity College, Cambridge

Sir Thomas Bellot, 3rd Baronet (1679–1709), of Moreton, Cheshire was a Tory politician who sat in the English and British House of Commons between 1705 and 1709.

== Biography ==
Bellot was baptized on 18 July 1679, the eldest surviving son of Sir Thomas Bellot, 2nd Baronet, of Moreton, Cheshire, and his wife Susanna Packe, daughter of Christopher Packe, Draper, of Basinghall Street, London and Cotes, Leicestershire. He was educated at Chester School, and was admitted at Trinity College, Cambridge on 3 February 1699. He succeeded his father as baronet on 28 November 1699. However, his father had acted as a surety for Morgan Whitley, who defaulted as receiver-general of taxes for Cheshire and North Wales and when the Treasury took proceedings against his father's executors in October 1703, Bellot may have run into financial difficulties.

Bellot stood for Parliament at Newcastle-under-Lyme at a by-election on 8 November 1703 and after being defeated, petitioned against the return of John Crewe Offley. On 1 February 1704, the election was declared void and a by-election was held in November 1704. He was defeated by Offley again, and decided not to petition. At the 1705 English general election, he was returned as Tory Member of Parliament for Newcastle-under-Lyme and voted against the Court candidate for Speaker on 25 October 1705. He was unseated on 27 February 1706. He was returned again for Newcastle-under-Lyme at the 1708 British general election.

Bellot died unmarried by 22 January 1709 and was succeeded by his brother Sir John Bellot, 4th Baronet.

Parliament of England
Preceded by John Crewe Offley; Rowland Cotton	Member of Parliament for Newcastle-under-Lyme; 1705–1706; With: Rowland Cotton	Succeeded by John Crewe Offley; John Lawton
Parliament of Great Britain
Preceded by Crewe Offley; John Lawton	Member of Parliament for Newcastle-under-Lyme; 1708–1709; With: Rowland Cotton	Succeeded by Crewe Offley; John Lawton
Baronetage of England
Preceded by Thomas Bellot	Baronet (of Moreton); 1674-1709	Succeeded by John Bellot
