= Rowland Cotton =

English politician (1581–1634)

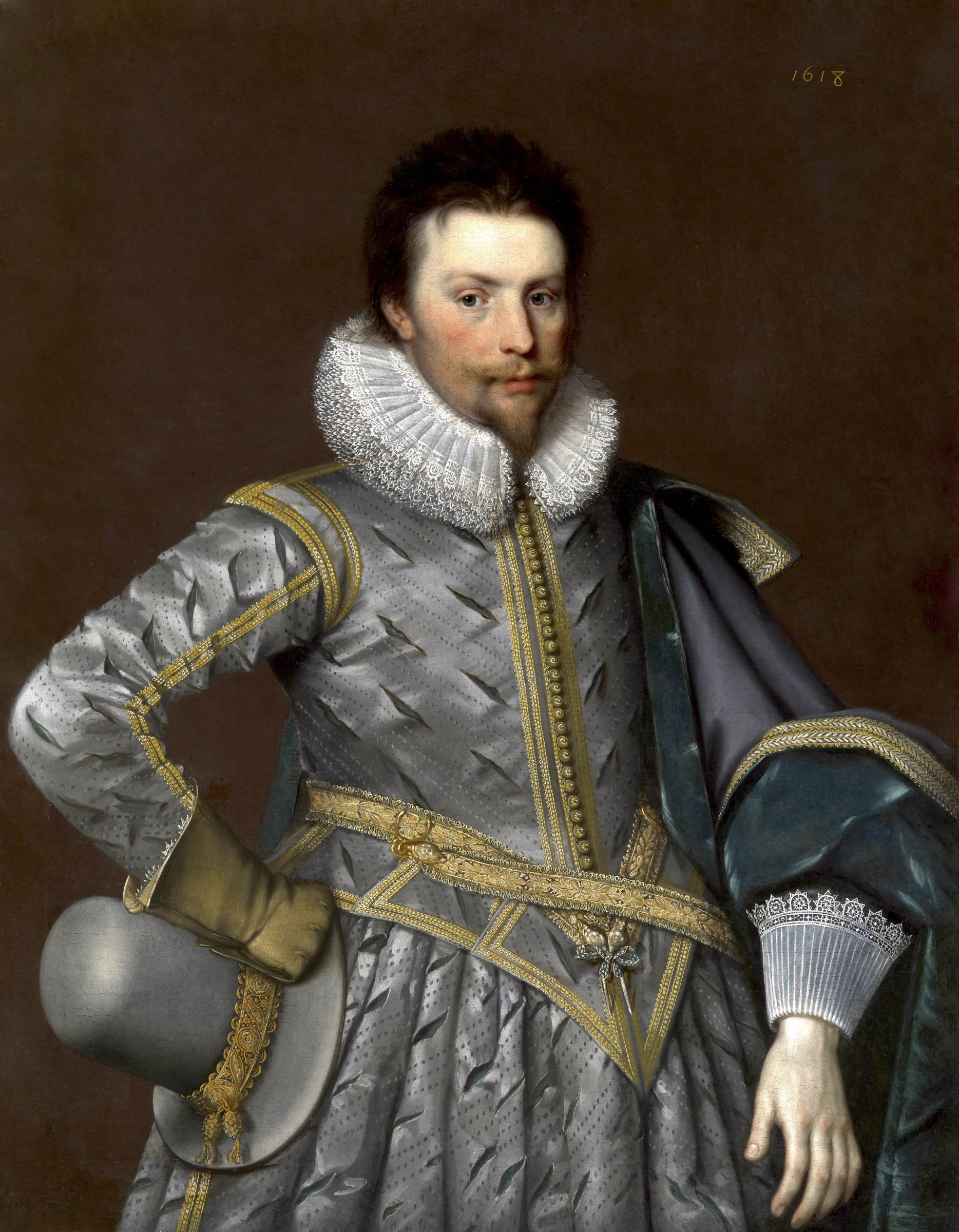
- portrait by Paul van Somer, 1618
- Died: 22 August 1634
- Alma mater: St John's College
- Occupation: Politician
- Position held: Member of the 1626 Parliament, Member of the 1628-29 Parliament

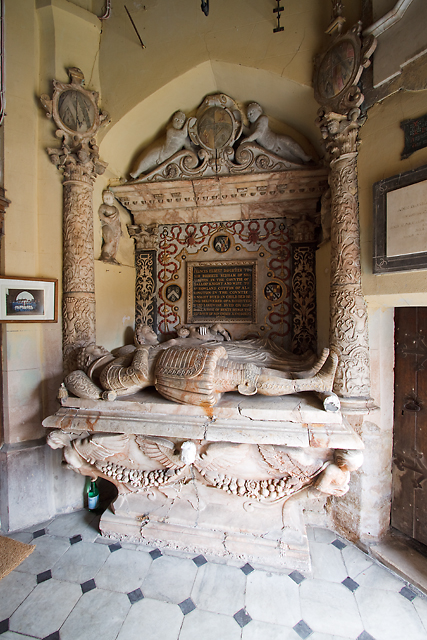
Monument to Sir Rowland Cotton and his wife in St Chad's Church, Norton in Hales

Sir Rowland Cotton (baptized 29 January 1581 – died 22 August 1634) was an English politician who sat in the House of Commons at various times between 1605 and 1629.

Cotton was the son of William Cotton, a London draper. He matriculated from St John's College, Cambridge in 1596 and was admitted at Lincoln's Inn on 13 June 1599. He was a friend and patron of John Lightfoot. He succeeded his father in 1607, inheriting estates in Shropshire and Staffordshire. He lived at Bellaport Hall, Norton in Hales, Shropshire.

In 1605, he was elected Member of Parliament for Newcastle-under-Lyme and knighted in 1608. He was appointed to the bench as Justice of the Peace for Shropshire by 1614 to his death, and as a commissioner of oyer and terminer for Wales and the Marches by 1616 to death. He served as Mayor of Newcastle in 1614–15. He was appointed also High Sheriff of Shropshire for 1616–17 and the following year a member of Council of the Marches for life.

In 1626 he was elected MP for Shropshire. He was elected MP for Newcastle-under-Lyme again in 1628 and sat until 1629 when Charles I decided to rule without parliament for eleven years.

He married twice: firstly Frances (who died in childbirth on 23 November 1606), the daughter of Sir Robert Needham of Shavington Hall and secondly Joyce, the daughter and coheiress of Sir Richard Walsh of Shelsley Walsh, Worcestershire, who survived Cotton, dying in 1637.

He died in August 1634 aged 53 and was buried at Norton in Hales. The parish church St Chad's contains a monument with effigies of Cotton and his first wife, Frances. The monument was designed by Inigo Jones around the year 1611, and a drawing by Jones survives. Rowland Cotton was associated with the court of Prince Henry, as was Jones. The tomb is the earliest known architectural work of Inigo Jones, and the design has some similarities with Jones' scenery for the Barriers and the Masque of Oberon.

He left no children and his estates reverted to his brother William on the death of his wife.

Parliament of England
Preceded by Sir Walter Chetwynd; John Bowyer	Member of Parliament for Newcastle-under-Lyme; 1605–1611; With: Sir Walter Chetwynd	Succeeded by Edward Wymarke; Robert Needham
Preceded by Sir Richard Newport; Sir Andrew Corbet	Member of Parliament for Shropshire; 1626; With: Sir Richard Leveson	Succeeded by Sir Richard Newport; Sir Andrew Corbet
Preceded by Sir John Skeffington, 2nd Baronet; John Keeling	Member of Parliament for Newcastle-under-Lyme; 1628–1629; With: Sir George Gresley	Parliament suspended until 1640
