= Sir George Gresley, 1st Baronet =

English landowner and politician

Sir George Gresley, 1st Baronet (c. 1580 – 1651) was an English landowner and politician who sat in the House of Commons from 1628 to 1629.

Gresley was the son of Sir Thomas Gresley of Drakelow, Derbyshire and his second wife Katherine Walsingham, daughter of Sir Thomas Walsingham, of Scadbury, Kent. He matriculated at Balliol College, Oxford in November 1594, aged 14 and was a student of Inner Temple in 1598. In September 1610 he succeeded to the estate of Drakelow on the death of his father. He was created baronet on 29 June 1611, and was subsequently knighted on 3 June 1612.

In 1628, Gresley was elected Member of Parliament for Newcastle-under-Lyme and sat until 1629 when King Charles decided to rule without parliament for eleven years. He was appointed Sheriff of Derbyshire by Parliament in 1644. Gresley was a great patron of learning.

Gresley died at the age of about 70 and was buried in the Temple Church, London on 5 February 1651.

Gresley married Susan Ferrers, daughter of Sir Humphrey Ferrers of Tamworth, Warwickshire and his wife Anne Bradborne, daughter of Sir Humphrey Bradborne, at Walton-on-Trent on 17 December 1600.

Parliament of England
Preceded by Sir John Skeffington; John Keeling	Member of Parliament for Newcastle-under-Lyme; 1628–1629; With: Sir Rowland Cotton	Parliament suspended until 1640
Baronetage of England
New creation	Baronet (of Drakelow); 1611–1651	Succeeded by Thomas Gresley
