= Thomas Lee (fl. 1420s) =

English politician

Thomas Lee (fl. 1420s) was an English politician.

== Life ==
The life, even the exact identity, of this politician is unclear. He had a son named William.

== Career ==
Lee was a member of parliament for Newcastle-under-Lyme in December 1421 and 1427.

Parliament of England
Preceded by John Biddulph with Thomas Baron	Member of Parliament for Newcastle-under-Lyme; 1421; With: Hugh Stanford	Succeeded by John Mynors with Hugh Stanford
Parliament of England
Preceded by Robert Wodehous with Henry Lilie	Member of Parliament for Newcastle-under-Lyme; 1427; With: John Wode	Succeeded by William Egerton with William Hextall
