= Thomas Baron (MP) =

English politician

Thomas Baron (fl. 1421) was an English politician.

== Life ==
By Easter 1428, he was married to a woman named Margery. Little is known of him, although there is a suggestion that he had connections with the Duchy of Lancaster.

== Career ==
Baron was Member of Parliament for the constituency of Newcastle-under-Lyme in 1421.

== Death ==
There are scant records on Baron, and none after 1428.

Parliament of England
Preceded by Hugo de Stanford with John Hardhed	Member of Parliament for Newcastle-under-Lyme; 1421; With: John Biddulph	Succeeded by Hugh Stanford with Thomas Lee
