= John Hardhead =

English politician

John Hardhead (fl. 1411–1420) was an English politician.

== Life ==
The Hardheads had become a well-known family in Newcastle-under-Lyme, Staffordshire. In June 1411, along with others including John Mynors (MP for Newcastle-under-Lyme and Staffordshire), Hardhead was arrested for a murder in Featherstone, Staffordshire and armed assaults against many people in Wolverhampton. He was eventually absolved in May 1415, after refusing to attend court on many occasions.

== Career ==
Hardhead was Member of Parliament for Newcastle-under-Lyme in 1420.

Parliament of England
Preceded by John Biddulph with John Mynors	Member of Parliament for Newcastle-under-Lyme; 1420; With: Hugh Stanford	Succeeded by John Biddulph with Thomas Baron
