= John Cook (fl. 1393) =

English politician

John Cook (fl. 1393), was an English politician.

He was a Member (MP) of the Parliament of England for Newcastle-under-Lyme in 1393. With so many politicians of this name, it is impossible to accurately identify him.

Parliament of England
Preceded by Thomas Thicknesse; Ralf de la Hogh	Member of Parliament for Newcastle-under-Lyme; 1393; With: Ralf de la Hogh	Succeeded by No records No records
