= 1878 Newcastle-under-Lyme by-election =

UK Parliamentary by-election

The 1878 Newcastle-under-Lyme by-election was fought on 23 August 1878. The by-election was fought due to the resignation of the incumbent Conservative MP, Sir Edmund Buckley. It was won by the Liberal candidate Samuel Rathbone Edge.

1878 Newcastle-under-Lyme by-election (1 seat)
Party	Candidate	Votes	%	±%
Liberal	Samuel Rathbone Edge	1,330	57.3	+23.7
Conservative	Charles Donaldson-Hudson	990	42.7	−23.8
Majority		340	14.6	N/A
Turnout		2,320	68.3	−5.8
Registered electors		3,396		
Liberal gain from Conservative		Swing	+23.8	
