= John Merrick (MP) =

Sir John Merrick (1584–1659) was an English politician who sat in the House of Commons from 1640 to 1648. He fought in the Parliamentary army in the English Civil War.

== Military career ==
John Merrick joined the 3rd earl of Essex's expedition to Flanders in 1620. In 1624, he fought as a soldier in the Low Countries and fought in Spain in 1625; he was also knighted that year. He fought in the Thirty Years' War under Gustavus Adolphus and was wounded on 17 August 1632 before Maastricht. In 1639–40, he commanded a regiment in the Bishops' Wars. When the Irish rebellion broke out in October 1641, the Commons recommended Sir John for a commission in Ireland.

On the outbreak of the Civil War Merrick was appointed Sergeant-Major-General in the Parliamentary Army commanded by the Earl of Essex. He commanded an infantry regiment Sir John Merrick's Foot, which took part in the Battle of Edgehill. After the Battle of Stratton, Merrick was appointed general of the Artillery, leading them at the Battles of Gloucester and Newbury.

== Political career ==
In April 1640, Sir John was elected Member of Parliament for Newcastle-under-Lyme in the Short Parliament. He was re-elected MP for Newcastle-under-Lyme for the Long Parliament in November 1640. In 1647, he served as assessment commissioner for Pembrokeshire. However, his disapproval of the execution of the king in 1649 led to his retirement during the Interregnum.

== Personal life ==
Sir John is a member of the Meyrick family. He married Alice Fitton of Gawsworth and had a son and two daughters. He later married a widow Jane Wyche, who bore him no children.

Merrick died at the age of 75 and was portrayed in Bush church wearing black armour. This portrait is now located at the family seat of Slebech.

Parliament of England
Vacant Parliament suspended since 1629	Member of Parliament for Newcastle-under-Lyme; 1640–1648; With: Richard Lloyd 1640; Sir Richard Leveson 1640–1643; Samuel Terrick 1645–1648	Not represented in Rump Parliament
