= Columbine cup =

Goblet in the shape of a columbine flower

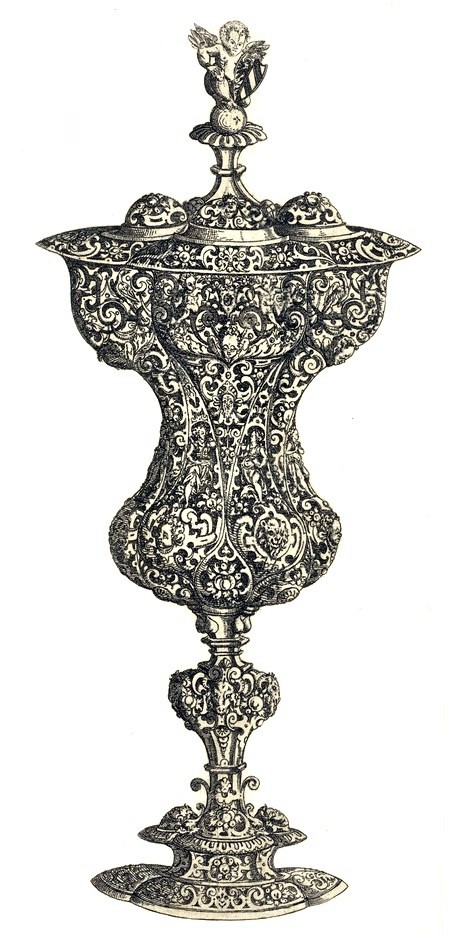
Design for a columbine cup, Georg Wechter, 1579

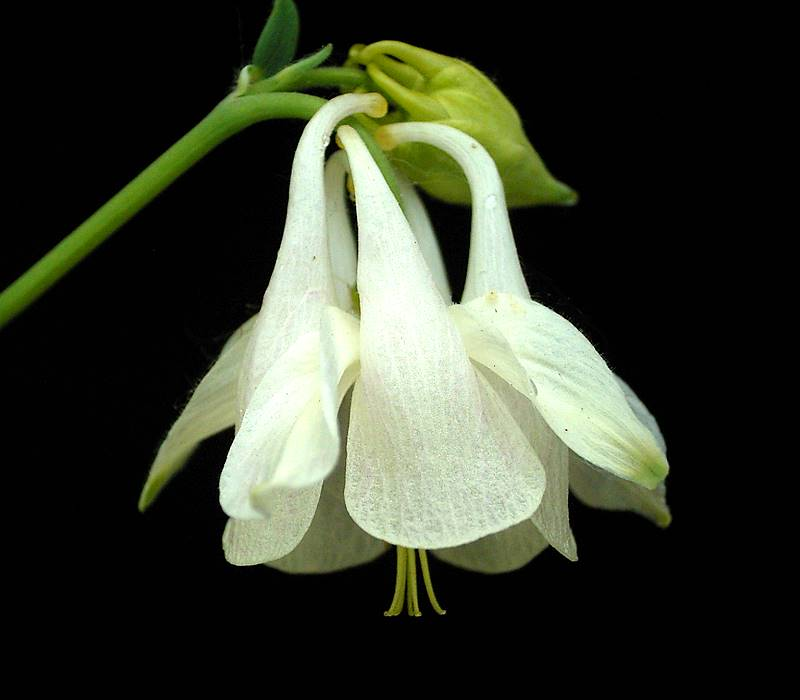
Flower of Aquilegia vulgaris

A columbine cup (German: Ackleibecher) is a silver goblet in the shape of a columbine flower (Aquilegia vulgaris). They were produced in Nuremberg, Germany, in the sixteenth century, often as masterpieces to demonstrate that a craftsman had the skills necessary to enter a craft guild.

== Etymology ==
The shape of the cups has been compared to the inverted flower of Aquilegia vulgaris which was thought to resemble a group of doves clustered together, resulting in the flower's common name of "columbine" from the Latin columbinus, meaning "like a dove". The word also gave its name to the bird family Columbidae, the dove genus Columbina, and the character of Columbina (the "little dove") in the theatrical genre of Commedia dell'arte.

== History ==
Columbine cups were first produced in Nuremberg in the sixteenth century, often as masterpieces to demonstrate the skills required to enter a craft guild. They are first mentioned in 1513 and from 1531 to 1572 were the most important of three items that apprentices were required to submit to the guild in order to move up from journeyman to master status. The others were a gold ring set with a precious stone and a die for a steel seal.

One of the most influential designs for a Columbine Cup was produced in Georg Wechter's 1579 pattern book 30 Stück zum verzachnen für die Goldschmied verfertigt Geörg Wechter 15 Maller 79 Nürnberg (Nuremberg, 1579; e.g. Berlin, Kupferstichkab.), which provided 30 designs that any competent goldsmith could copy if he could not produce his own.

== Examples ==
Two columbine cups are in the collection of the Victoria & Albert Museum, one formerly owned by the Nuremberg Goldsmiths Corporation and thought to be from the workshop of Wenzel Jamnitzer, and one by an unknown maker. The museum has another on loan to it that was made of gold in London in 1857–58. The British Museum also has an example that they acquired in 1824. Other examples are in Nuremberg.
