= Bellot baronets =

Extinct baronetcy in the Baronetage of England

The Bellot Baronetcy, of Moreton in the County of Chester, was a title in the Baronetage of England. It was created on 30 June 1663 for John Bellot of Great Moreton Hall, near Astbury, Cheshire, who was High Sheriff of Staffordshire in 1661. He came from an ancient Cheshire family, and was the eldest son of John Moreton and Ursula Bentley. The second Baronet was several times Member of Parliament for Newcastle-under-Lyme. The baronetcy became extinct on the death of the fourth Baronet in 1714. The Moreton estate was sold on his death.

== Bellot baronets, of Moreton (1663) ==
- Sir John Bellot, 1st Baronet (1619–1674)
- Sir Thomas Bellot, 2nd Baronet (1651–1699)
- Sir Thomas Bellot, 3rd Baronet (1676–1709)
- Sir John Bellot, 4th Baronet (1679-1714)
