= Wechter =

Wechter is a surname. Notable people with the surname include:

- Abraham Wechter, American luthier
- Julius Wechter (1935–1999), American musician and composer
- Georg Wechter (1526–1586), German painter and engraver
- Esaias Wechter (1701–1776), Finnish merchant, industrialist, and politician
