= Walter Chetwynd (disambiguation) =

Walter Chetwynd (1633–1695) was an antiquary and politician.

Walter Chetwynd may also refer to:

- Walter Chetwynd (Newcastle-under-Lyme MP) (died May 1638), English politician
- Walter Chetwynd, 1st Viscount Chetwynd (1678–1736), English politician
- Walter Chetwynd (Lichfield MP) (c. 1680–1732), English politician
