= Crewe Offley =

British landowner and Whig politician

Crewe Offley (1682–1739) of Wychnor Hall, Staffordshire, was a British landowner and Whig politician who sat in the English and British House of Commons between 1706 and 1734.

== Early life ==
Offley was baptized on 14 November 1682, the second son of John Offley of Madeley, Staffordshire and his wife Anne Crewe, daughter of John Crewe of Crewe Hall, Cheshire. In 1698, he succeeded his mother at Wychnor, and in 1711, he inherited some of the estates of his great-uncle Sir John Crewe of Utkinton. He married Margaret Lawrence, daughter of Sir Thomas Lawrence of Chelsea, Middlesex on 2 May 1710.

== Career ==
Offley's family held a significant electoral interest in Cheshire. At the 1705 general election Offley's elder brother John Crewe Offley decided to stand for Cheshire allowing Offley to stand at Newcastle-under-Lyme on the family interest Although defeated at the polls, he was seated on petition on 27 February 1706, together with his Whig partner, John Lawton, after proving bribery and other illegal practices byt their Tory opponents. Before he took his seat he was listed on 18 February 1706 as a supporter of the Court over the ‘place clauses’ of the regency bill. At the 1708 general election at Newcastle-under-Lyme the previous contest was repeated. Offley and his partner Lawton were defeated in the poll, and then seated on petition on 1 February 1709. He voted for the naturalization of the Palatines and for the impeachment of Dr Sacheverell in 1710. The Cheshire Whigs looked to him to present their address criticizing the doctor's conduct in July 1710. Probably in consequence, given the public support for Sacheverell, he decided not take part at the Newcastle election in 1710 He was appointed a Gentleman of the privy chamber in July 1714, shortly before Queen Anne's death, and retained the post for the rest of his life.

Offley stood as a Whig again for Newcastle-under-Lyme at the 1715 general election, and was returned on petition for the third time on 2 June 1715. He voted for the septennial bill in 1716. He also voted against the government on the repeal of the Occasional Conformity and Schism Acts in 1719, but for them on the Peerage Bill. At the 1722 general election, he was returned instead as MP for Bewdley by Henry Herbert, 2nd Baron Herbert of Chirbury. He was returned there again at the 1727 general election. He voted with the Administration until the 1734 general election, when he was defeated.

== Death and legacy ==
Offley died on 28 June 1739 leaving two sons. His son John inherited Wychnor and sold it in 1765 to John Levett.

Parliament of England
Preceded by John Crewe Offley; Sir Thomas Bellot, Bt	Member of Parliament for Newcastle-under-Lyme; 1706–1708; With: John Lawton	Succeeded by Parliament of Great Britain
Parliament of Great Britain
Preceded by Sir Thomas Bellot, Bt; Rowland Cotton	Member of Parliament for Newcastle-under-Lyme; 1709–1710; With: John Lawton	Succeeded by William Burslem; Rowland Cotton
Preceded by Henry Vernon; Rowland Cotton	Member of Parliament for Newcastle-under-Lyme; 1715–1722; With: Sir Brian Broughton	Succeeded by Sir Brian Broughton; Thomas Leveson-Gower
Preceded by Grey James Grove	Member of Parliament for Bewdley; 1722–1734	Succeeded by William Bowles
