= Walter Chetwynd (Newcastle-under-Lyme MP) =

English politician

Walter Chetwynd (died 31 May 1638) was an English politician who sat in the House of Commons at various times between 1584 and 1614.

== Life ==
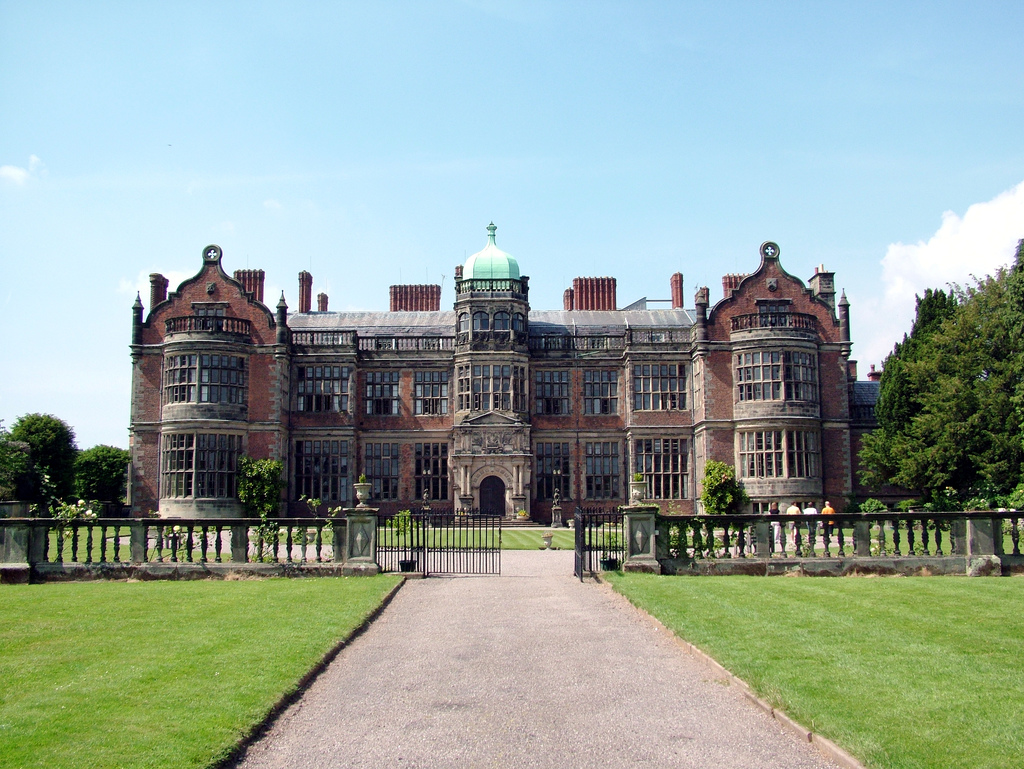
Ingestre Hall, Staffordshire

Chetwynd was the son of John Chetwynd of Ingestre, near Stafford and his second wife Margery Middlemore, daughter of Robert Middlemore of Edgbaston, Warwickshire. He was educated at Barnard's Inn and at Gray's Inn in 1582. He succeeded his half-brother Sir William Chetwynd to the Ingestre estate in 1612.

In 1584, he was elected Member of Parliament for Newcastle-under-Lyme. He was re-elected MP for Newcastle in 1586. From about 1592 he was J.P. for Shropshire and by 1596 he was JP for Staffordshire. He was commissioner for musters for Staffordshire in 1601. In 1604 he was knighted and was elected MP for Newcastle-under-Lyme again. He was High Sheriff of Staffordshire for 1607–08.

In 1613 he rebuilt Ingestre Hall. From 1613 to 1614 he was Mayor of Newcastle-under-Lyme. In 1614 he was elected MP for Staffordshire.

Chetwynd married firstly Mary Mullins, daughter of John Mullins, Archdeacon of London and had two sons and a daughter. He married secondly Catherine Unton, widow of Edward Unton of Wadley, Berkshire and daughter of Sir George Hastings. He was succeeded by his eldest son, Walter.

Parliament of England
| Preceded by Ralph Bourchier; Thomas Grimsdiche | Member of Parliament for Newcastle-under-Lyme; 1584–1586; With: Peter Warburton 1584; James Colyer | Succeeded by Thomas Humphrey; Francis Angier |
| Preceded by Edward Mainwaring; Thomas Trentham | Member of Parliament for Newcastle-under-Lyme; 1604–1611; With: John Bowyer 1604–1605; Rowland Cotton 1605–1611 | Succeeded by Edward Wymarke; Robert Needham |
| Preceded by Sir Edward Littleton; Robert Stanford | Member of Parliament for Staffordshire; 1614; With: Thomas Crompton | Succeeded by Sir William Bowyer; Thomas Crompton |
