= John Leveson-Gower =

John Leveson-Gower may refer to:

- John Leveson-Gower, 1st Baron Gower (1675–1709), English politician
- John Leveson-Gower, 1st Earl Gower (1694–1754), English politician
- John Leveson-Gower (Royal Navy officer) (1740–1792), British Royal Navy officer
