= Aaron Bell =

Aaron Bell may refer to:

- Aaron Bell (musician) (1921–2003), American jazz double-bassist
- Aaron Bell (politician) (born 1980), British politician
