= Thomas Gresley =

Thomas Gresley may refer to:

- Thomas Gresley (died 1445), member of parliament (MP) for Staffordshire and Derbyshire
- Thomas Gresley (1552–1610), MP for Derbyshire in 1597
- Sir Thomas Gresley, 2nd Baronet (c.1628–1699), High Sheriff of Derbyshire 1663
- Sir Thomas Gresley, 4th Baronet (c.1699–1746), High Sheriff of Derbyshire 1724
- Sir Thomas Gresley, 5th Baronet (1722–1753), MP for Lichfield 1753
- Sir Thomas Gresley, 10th Baronet (1832–1868), MP for South Derbyshire
