= John Leveson-Gower, 1st Baron Gower =

English peer from the Leveson-Gower family

John Leveson-Gower, 1st Baron Gower PC (17 January 1674 – 31 August 1709), styled Sir John Leveson-Gower, 5th Baronet, from 1691–1703, was an English peer and politician from the Leveson-Gower family. His four sons served in parliament.

== Biography ==
Leveson-Gower was born in Stittenham, in the parish of Sheriff Hutton, Yorkshire. He was the eldest and only surviving son of Sir William Leveson-Gower, 4th Baronet and his wife, Lady Jane Granville. His maternal grandparents were John Granville, 1st Earl of Bath and his wife Jane Wyche, daughter of Sir Peter Wyche.

John Leveson-Gower was Tory MP for Newcastle-under-Lyme, 1692–1703. He was created Baron Gower of Stittenham in the County of York on 16 March 1703. He was made member of the Privy Council from 1702 to 1707, and he was appointed Chancellor of the Duchy of Lancaster from 1702 to 1706. He was Commissioner of the Union in 1706.

== Marriage and issue ==
In September 1692, Sir John married Lady Catherine Manners (1675–1722), daughter of John Manners, 1st Duke of Rutland and his third wife, Catherine Noel. They had seven children:

- John Leveson-Gower, 1st Earl Gower (1694–1754), who married and had issue from: firstly, Lady Evelyn Pierrepont, daughter of Evelyn Pierrepont, 1st Duke of Kingston-upon-Hull; secondly, Penelope Stonhouse, daughter of Sir John Stonhouse, 7th Baronet; thirdly, Lady Mary Tufton, daughter of Thomas Tufton, 6th Earl of Thanet.
- Hon. Katherine Leveson-Gower (6 January 1695 – 20 April 1712), died young
- William Leveson-Gower (1697–1756), MP for Stafford from 1720 to 1754. He married Anne Grosvenor, daughter of Sir Thomas Grosvenor, and had a daughter, Catherine.
- Thomas Leveson-Gower (6 May 1699 – 12 August 1727), MP for Newcastle-under-Lyme from 1720 until his death, unmarried
- Hon. Jane Leveson-Gower (25 July 1700 – 10 June 1726), married 5 January 1718/19, John Proby, who died 1760 and had issue, John Proby, 1st Baron Carysfort.
- Bridget Leveson-Gower (11 November 1701 – ), died young
- Baptist Leveson-Gower (1703–1782), MP for Newcastle-under-Lyme from 1727 to 1761.

He died on 31 August 1709 in Belvoir Castle, Grantham, Lincolnshire.

== Ancestry ==
Ancestors of John Leveson-Gower, 1st Baron Gower

16. Thomas Gower
8. Thomas Gower, 1st Bt. of Stittenham
17. Mary Fairfax
4. Thomas Gower, 2nd Bt. of Stittenham
18. John Doyley
9. Anne Doyley
19. Anne Barnard
2. William Leveson-Gower, 4th Bt.
20. John Leveson
10. John Leveson
21. Christian Mildmay
5. Frances Leveson
22. Thomas Sondes
11. Frances Sondes
23. Margaret Brooke
1. John Leveson-Gower, 1st Baron Gower
24. Bernard Grenville
12. Bevil Grenville
25. Elizabeth Bevil
6. John Granville, 1st Earl of Bath
26. George Smythe
13. Grace Smythe
27. Grace Vyell
3. Jane Granville
28. Richard Wyche
14. Peter Wyche
29. Elizabeth Saltonstall
7. Jane Wyche
30. William Meredith
15. Jane Meredith
31. Jane Palmer

Parliament of England
Preceded by Sir William Leveson-Gower, Bt; Sir Thomas Bellot, Bt	Member of Parliament for Newcastle-under-Lyme; 1692–1703; With: Sir Thomas Bellot, Bt 1692–1695; John Lawton 1695–1698; Sir Thomas Bellot, Bt 1698–1699; Rowland Cotton 1699–1703	Succeeded by John Offley; Rowland Cotton
Political offices
Preceded by The Earl of Stamford	Chancellor of the Duchy of Lancaster; 1702–1706	Succeeded by The Earl of Derby
Peerage of England
New creation	Baron Gower; 1703–1709	Succeeded by John Leveson-Gower
Baronetage of England
Preceded by William Leveson-Gower	Baronet (of Stittenham); 1691–1709	Succeeded by John Leveson-Gower
