= Masterpiece =

Creation that has been given much critical praise

Leonardo da Vinci's Mona Lisa (c. 1503–06) is considered an archetypal masterpiece, although it was not produced for admission to a guild or academy.

A masterpiece, magnum opus (Latin for 'great work'), or chef-d'œuvre (French for 'master of work'; pl. chefs-d'œuvre; French: [ʃɛf.d‿œvʁ]) is a creation that has been given much critical praise, especially one that is considered the greatest work of a person's career or a work of outstanding creativity, skill, profundity, or workmanship.

Historically, a "masterpiece" was a work of a very high standard produced by an apprentice to obtain full membership, as a "master", of a craft guild or academy in various areas of the visual arts and crafts.

== Etymology ==
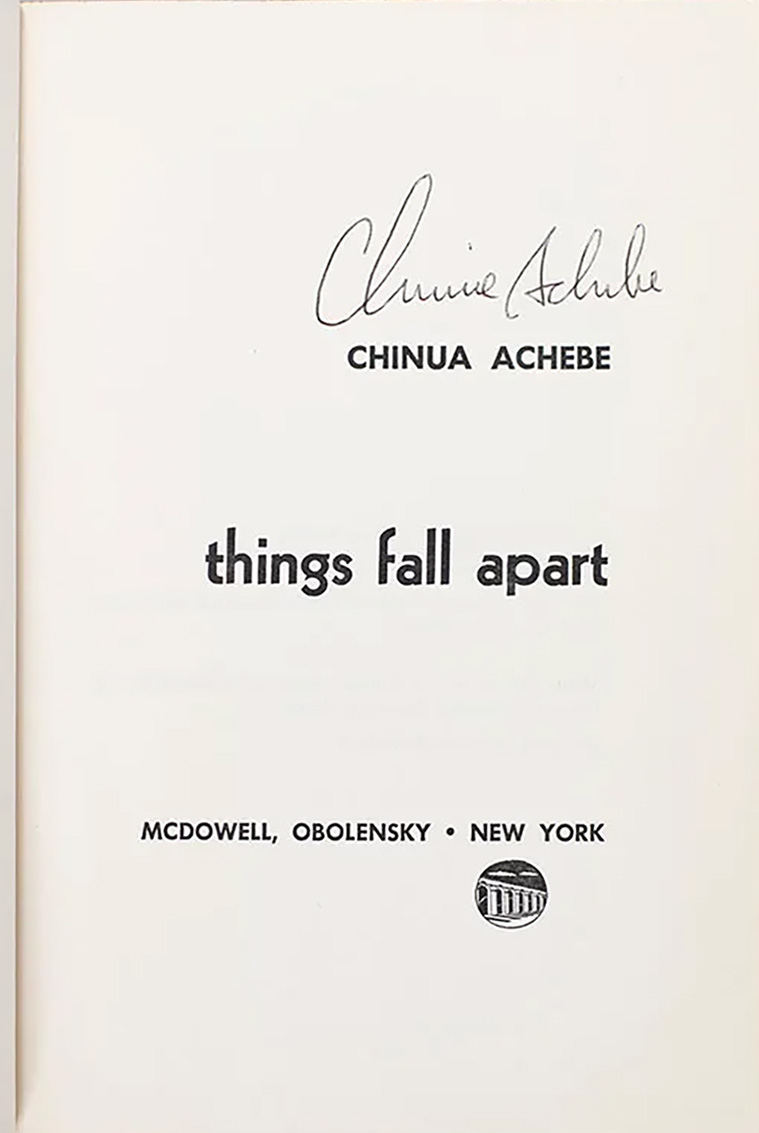
Things Fall Apart by Igbo author Chinua Achebe is often considered a literary masterpiece, and one of the greatest works of Nigerian literature.

The form masterstik is recorded in English or Scots in a set of Aberdeen guild regulations dated to 1579, whereas masterpiece is first found in 1605, already outside a guild context, in a Ben Jonson play. Masterprize was another early variant in English.

In English, the term rapidly became used in a variety of contexts for an exceptionally good piece of creative work and was "in early use, often applied to man as the 'masterpiece' of God or Nature".

== History ==
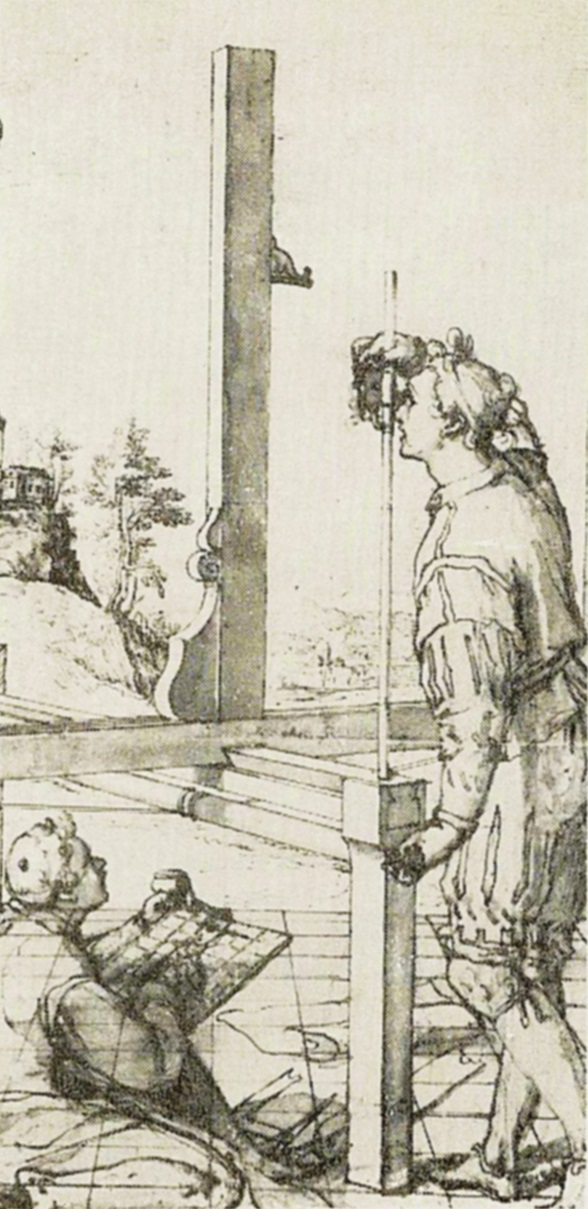
Federico Zuccari, Two Painter's Apprentices, 1609. They would have to produce a masterpiece to become masters at the end of their apprenticeships.

Originally, the term masterpiece referred to a piece of work produced by an apprentice or journeyman aspiring to become a master craftsman in the old European guild system. Their fitness to qualify for guild membership was judged partly by the masterpiece, and if they were successful, the piece was retained by the guild. Because of this, great care was usually taken to produce a fine piece in whatever the craft was, whether confectionery, painting, goldsmithing, knifemaking, leatherworking, or another trade.

For instance, in 17th century London, the Worshipful Company of Goldsmiths required an apprentice to produce a masterpiece under their supervision at a "workhouse" in Goldsmiths' Hall. The workhouse had been set up as part of a tightening of standards after the company became concerned that the skill level of their goldsmiths was worsening. The wardens of the company had complained in 1607 that the "true practise of the Art & Mystery of Goldsmithry is not only grown into great decays but also dispersed into many parts, so as now very few workmen are able to finish & perfect a piece of plate singularly with all the garnishings & parts thereof without the help of many & several hands." Today, the organization still requires the production of a masterpiece for apprenticeship, but it is no longer produced under supervision.

In Nuremberg, Germany, between 1531 and 1572, apprentices who wished to become master goldsmiths were required to produce columbine cups, dies for a steel seal, and gold rings set with precious stones before they could be admitted to the goldsmiths' guild. If they failed to be admitted, then they could continue to work for other goldsmiths but not as a master themselves. In some guilds, apprentices were not allowed to marry until they had obtained full membership.

In its original meaning, the term mostly applied to tangible products, but in guilds that comprised creators of intangible products, the same system was also used. The best-known example today is Richard Wagner's opera Die Meistersinger von Nürnberg (1868), where much of the plot is concerned with the hero's composition and performance of a "masterpiece" song to allow him to become a meistersinger in the (non-commercial) Nuremberg guild. This aligns with the surviving rulebook of the guild.

The practice of producing a masterpiece has continued in some modern academies of art, where the general term for such works is now reception piece. The Royal Academy in London uses the term "diploma work," and it has acquired a large collection of diploma works received as a condition of membership.

== Modern use ==
In modern use, a masterpiece is a creation in any area of the arts that has been given much critical praise, especially one that is considered the greatest work of a person's career or a work of outstanding creativity, skill, profundity, or workmanship. For example, the novel David Copperfield by Charles Dickens is generally considered a literary masterpiece. The term is often used loosely, and some critics, such as Edward Douglas of The Tracking Board, feel it is overused in describing recent films.

== See also ==
- Artistic merit
- Classic
- Great books
- Masterpieces of the Oral and Intangible Heritage of Humanity
- Painting the Century: 101 Portrait Masterpieces 1900–2000
- Virtual Collection of Asian Masterpieces
- Western canon
