= John Wood I of Keele =

English politician

John Wood of Keele was an English politician.

He was elected MP for Newcastle-under-Lyme in 1425, served in the parliaments of 1427/8, 1431, 1432 and 1433, and was Escheator for Staffordshire in 1437.

Wood's son John Wood was also MP for Newcastle-under-Lyme, 1472–1475. Wood's daughter Elizabeth married Robert Boughey in 1447.

Wood may have died before 1443, when the lands of John Wood of Swynnerton were transferred to the king, or he may have been alive at the time of his daughter's marriage in 1447 (he is not described as dead), and he may have been Mayor of Newcastle-under-Lyme in 1458.
