= Richard Lloyd (Royalist) =

English politician

Sir Richard Lloyd (23 February 1606 – 5 May 1676) was an English politician who sat in the House of Commons at various times between 1628 and 1676. He fought for the Royalist army in the English Civil War.

== Early life ==
Lloyd was the eldest son of Evan Lloyd of Dulasau, Penmachno, Caernarvonshire and his wife Janet ap Ieuan, daughter of Roderick ap Ieuan of Pennarth, Llanystumdwy, Caernarvonshire. He entered Gray's Inn in 1618 and attended Wadham College, Oxford, where he was awarded BA in 1624. He succeeded to the estates of his father in 1626. In 1628, he was elected Member of Parliament for Montgomery and sat until 1629 when King Charles decided to rule without parliament for eleven years. He was called to the bar in 1635 and was Reader of Barnard's Inn in 1639.

== Political career ==
In April 1640, Lloyd was elected MP for Newcastle-under-Lyme in the Short Parliament. He was attorney-general for North Wales from 1640 to 1647. On the outbreak of the civil war he was commissioner of array for Denbighshire and Radnorshire in 1642 and was knighted on 7 October 1642. From 1642 to 1647 he was colonel of dragoons in the Royalist army. He was governor of Holt Castle from 1645 to 1647 and under his command, the castle held out longer than any other garrison except Harlech. He was given very favourable terms on surrender and was allowed to go into exile while his estate was granted to his wife. He settled at Calais and took no part in royalist activities and returned at the Restoration.

Lloyd resumed his position as attorney-general for North Wales in July 1660, and remained to 1671. He was chief justice of the Brecon circuit and a J.P. for Breconshire, Caernarvonshire, Denbighshire, Glamorgan and Radnorshire from July 1660 until his death. He was commissioner for assessment for Denbighshire and Caernarvonshire from August 1660 and commissioner for assessment for Glamorgan and Merioneth from 1661 until his death. He was commissioner for assessment for Radnorshire from 1661 to 1663. In 1661, being chief justice of the circuit, he was elected MP for both Cardiff and Radnorshire and chose to sit for Radnorshire in the Cavalier Parliament. He was a commissioner for loyal and indigent officers for Caernarvonshire, Denbighshire, Merioneth and Radnorshire in 1662 and commissioner for assessment for Radnorshire and commissioner for assessment for Breconshire from 1665. He was Deputy Lieutenant for Denbighshire from 1674.

== Death ==
Lloyd died at the age of 70.

Lloyd married Margaret Sneyd, daughter of Ralph Sneyd of Keele, Staffordshire on 24 September 1632. He had a son and three daughters.

Parliament of England
| Preceded by Sir Henry Herbert | Member of Parliament for Montgomery; 1628–1629 | Parliament suspended until 1640 |
| Vacant Parliament suspended since 1629 | Member of Parliament for Newcastle-under-Lyme; 1640; With: Sir John Merrick | Succeeded by Sir Richard Leveson; Sir John Merrick |
