= Thomas Gresley (1552–1610) =

Thomas Gresley (1552–1610) was an English landowner, High Sheriff of Staffordshire, and MP for Derbyshire in 1597. He was involved in arrangements for keeping Mary, Queen of Scots a prisoner in England.

== Career ==
Thomas Gresley was a son of William Gresley (died 1573) and Katherine, a daughter of Edward Aston of Tixall.

Greasley was involved in buying furnishing fabrics for the lodgings of Mary, Queen of Scots at Tutbury Castle, and her move to Chartley. When the household of Mary, Queen of Scots, was investigated in August 1586, Thomas Gresley helped escort the Scottish queen from Chartley to Tixall. Some members of Mary's household, including a priest Camille du Preau and the junior secretary Jérôme Pasquier were sent to lodge at Gresley's house. Gresley subsequently escorted Mary to Fotheringhay Castle.

He married Elizabeth Harvey, secondly in 1574 Catherine Walsingham (died 1585), a daughter of Thomas Walsingham of Scadbury, and thirdly Mary Southwell, a daughter of Richard Southwell of Woodrising. Thomas and Catherine had eight children, including George Gresley.

Thomas Gresley was knighted by James VI and I at Worksop Manor in 1603. He died in September 1610 and was buried at St George and St Mary's Church at Church Gresley near Swadlincote.

== The Gresley jewel ==
The Gresley jewel is regarded as a marriage pendant and is traditionally supposed to have been a gift from Elizabeth I, though it may be later in date than Gresley's second wedding in 1574. The jewel includes a sardonyx cameo portrait of African woman with a white headscarf. It opens to reveal miniature portraits of Thomas Gresley and his second wife Catherine Walsingham. The portraits are by Nicholas Hilliard. Another portrait of Catherine Walsingham, Lady Gresley, dated 1585, shows her wearing the jewel. An inventory of the possessions of William Herbert, 1st Earl of Pembroke made around 1560 includes a jewel with a similar cameo portrait of a "woman morens hedde" wearing a scarf or "launde".

The mannerist goldwork of the jewel, which includes two African archers, has been compared to designs by the Nuremberg goldsmith, Georg Wechter. Similar cameos were supplied by a London goldsmith, John Mabbe. Kim F. Hall suggests that representations of black Africans were connected in Elizabethan culture with marketing of new kinds of profitable foreign luxury goods, and the roles of African people as household servants or slaves in colonial labour.
