= William Thickness =

English politician

William Thickness (died c. 1403), of Newcastle-under-Lyme, Staffordshire, was an English politician.

He was a member (MP) of the parliament of England for Newcastle-under-Lyme in 1378, January 1380, October 1382, April 1384, February 1388 and September 1388.

He was Mayor of Newcastle-under-Lyme in 1372–73, 1379–1381, 1382–1384, 1385–86, 1387–88, 1395–96 and 1399–1400.
