= John Wood II of Keele =

English politician

John Wood of Keele was an English politician.

Wood was born c. 1430, the son and heir of John Wood MP.

Wood served as a JP in Staffordshire 1465–1474, and as MP for Newcastle-under-Lyme 1472–1475.
