= Adam Jogee =

British politician

Adam Jogee MP
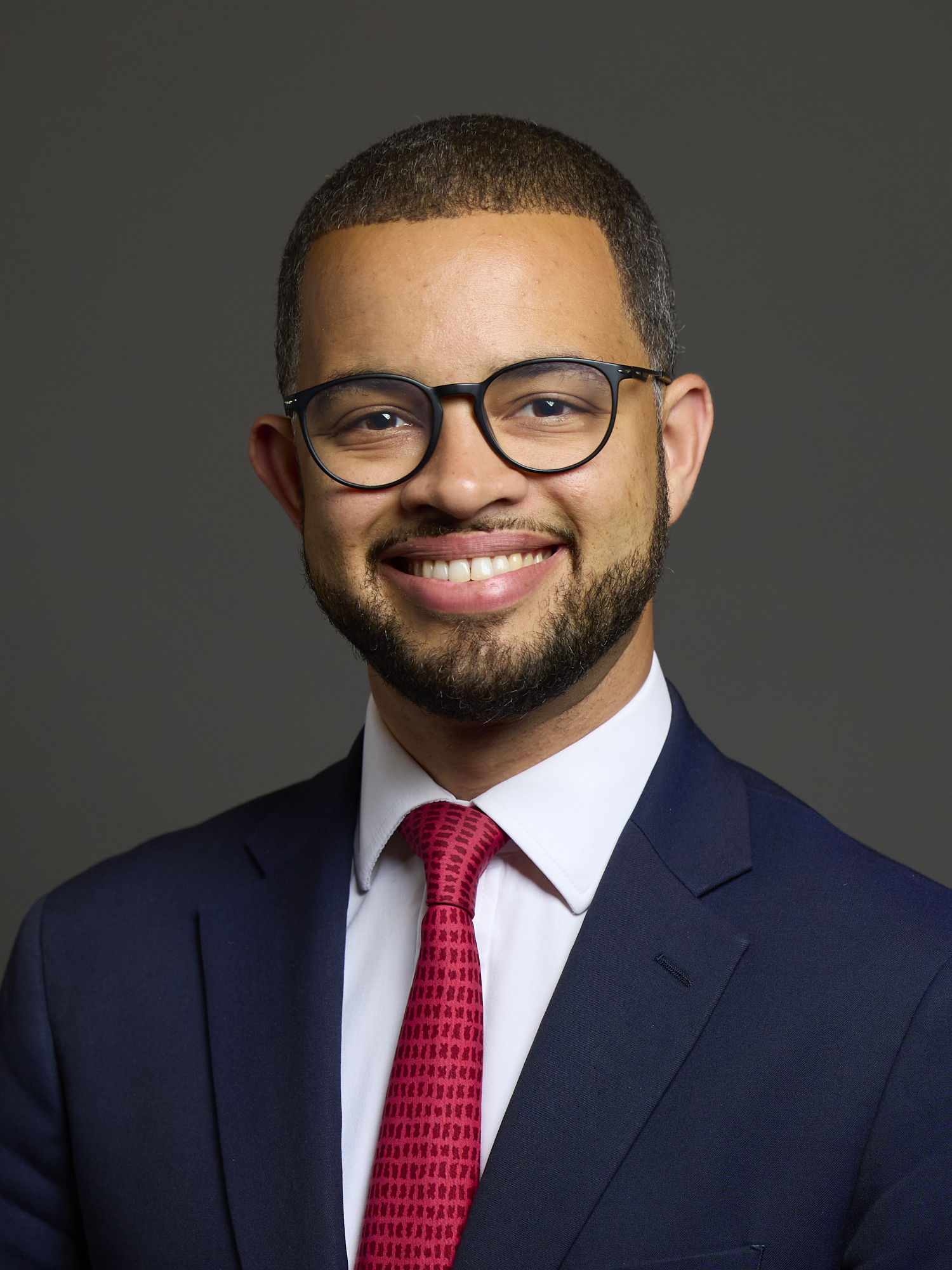
- Official portrait, 2024

Member of Parliament for Newcastle-under-Lyme
- Incumbent
- Assumed office 4 July 2024
- Preceded by: Aaron Bell
- Majority: 5,069 (12.8%)

Member of Haringey London Borough Council for Hornsey
- In office 22 May 2014 – 4 July 2024

Personal details
- Born: Adam Habib Jogee Haringey, London, England
- Party: Labour

Adam Habib Jogee (born December 1991) is a British Labour Party politician who has served as Member of Parliament (MP) for Newcastle-under-Lyme since 2024.

== Life ==
Jogee was born in Haringey, and has Jamaican and Zimbabwean heritage. His grandfather arrived in Liverpool in 1941 and, after getting married, he lived in Staffordshire. Jogee took his A-levels at Highgate School, and was a member of Haringey Youth Parliament at the age of 16.

== Politics ==
Jogee was a councillor for Haringey London Borough Council (Hornsey ward) and was Mayor of Haringey in 2020 while working for Labour MP Ruth Jones. He was selected as Labour's prospective parliamentary candidate for Newcastle-under-Lyme in April 2023. There was controversy within the local Labour Party regarding the selection of Jogee. Local media reported that three of the five constituency branches boycotted the selection process in protest over the exclusion of prominent local councillor Dave Jones from the longlist. Members expressed frustration that Jones, a well-known local figure, was overlooked in favour of candidates from outside the area, including Jogee, leading to accusations of Labour national HQ "parachuting" in a candidate, bypassing local preferences. Jogee resigned from Haringey council when Rishi Sunak, the prime minister at the time, called a general election to take place on 4 July 2024, leading to a Haringey Council by-election for Hornsey to take place on the same day as the general election.

Jogee was elected as MP for Newcastle-under-Lyme with a majority of 5,069.

Jogee was elected as a member of the Northern Ireland Affairs Select Committee in 2024.

Jogee opposed the End of Life Bill Terminally Ill Adults (End of Life) Bill The Bill, introduced by Kim Leadbeater, proposed to legalise assisted dying for terminally ill adults in England and Wales. In 2025 Jogee voted against the Bill at its third reading in the House of Commons.
