= Edward Wymarke =

Sixteenth century English member of Parliament

Edward Wymarke (died 30 September 1634) was an English minor official and politician who sat in the House of Commons between 1597 and 1614.

Wymarke was the only son of Edward Wymarke of Luffenham, Rutland and his wife Margaret Dudley, daughter of William Dudley of Clopton, Northamptonshire. He was known as "Ned Wymarke".

Wymarke was a fringe official who collected revenue for the crown from concealed lands and was reimbursed from the proceeds. In 1597, he was returned as Member of Parliament for Chippenham after the elected candidate Thomas Edmunds was sent abroad as an ambassador. He succeeded to the estates of his father in 1599. In 1601 he was re-elected MP for Chippenham. He sold his revenue collection office and register of lands in 1602. In 1604 he was elected MP for Peterborough. He was re-elected MP for Peterborough in 1614. He was also elected MP for Liverpool and Newcastle-under-Lyme in 1614 but it is not known which was his chosen seat. He lived comfortably in London, and is noted as bemusing his friends by going out by "owl light to the Star and to the Windmill".

Wymarke died probably unmarried in 1634 and was buried in St. Botolph’s, Aldersgate. He left his estate to his sister Frances Green, wife of John Green of Market Overton, Rutland.

Parliament of England
Preceded by Thomas Edmondes; Sharington Talbot	Member of Parliament for Chippenham; 1597–1601; With: Sharington Talbot 1597; Robert Berkeley	Succeeded by John Hungerford; General John Roberts
Preceded by Nicholas Tufton; Goddard Pemberton	Member of Parliament for Peterborough; 1604–1614; With: Sir Richard Cecil	Succeeded by Sir William Walter; Roger Manwood
Preceded by Sir Walter Chetwynd; Sir Rowland Cotton	Member of Parliament for Newcastle-under-Lyme; 1614; With: Robert Needham	Succeeded by Sir John Davies; Edward Kerton
