= John Keeling (politician) =

English politician

John Keeling (1586–1649) was an English lawyer and politician who sat in the House of Commons in 1625 and 1626.

Keeling was from Staffordshire. He matriculated at Brasenose College, Oxford on 23 November 1593, aged 17 and was awarded BA from St Mary Hall, Oxford on 14 December 1599. In 1618 he was called to the bar at Inner Temple and was awarded MA on 1 August 1621. In 1625, he was elected Member of Parliament for Newcastle-under-Lyme. He was of Humberton, Hackney, Middlesex and later of Hadleigh, Essex.

Parliament of England
Preceded by Sir Edward Vere; Richard Leveson	Member of Parliament for Newcastle-under-Lyme; 17 May 1625–1626; With: Edward Mainwaring; Sir John Skeffington, 2nd Baronet (11 February–15 June 1626)	Succeeded by Sir George Gresley; Sir Rowland Cotton
