= William Colclough =

English politician

William Colclough (died c. 1414), of Newcastle-under-Lyme, Staffordshire and Calverhall, Shropshire, was an English politician.

He was a member (MP) of the parliament of England for Newcastle-under-Lyme in November 1384, 1385, 1386, January 1390, 1395 and January 1397.
