= John Joce (MP for Newcastle-under-Lyme) =

English politician

John Joce (fl. 1402) was an English politician.

He was a member (MP) of the parliament of England for Newcastle-under-Lyme in 1402.

Parliament of England
| Preceded by Thomas Podmore; Thomas Thicknesse | Member of Parliament for Newcastle-under-Lyme; 1402; With: Thomas Joce | Succeeded by Richard Fyton; William Lee |
