= Thomas Joce =

English politician

Thomas Joce (fl. 1402) was an English politician. He sat as MP for Newcastle-under-Lyme in 1402.

Nothing is known about him other than the fact that he was returned to the same parliament as John Joce and was presumably related to him.
