= Sir Brian Broughton, 3rd Baronet =

British politician

Sir Brian Broughton, 3rd Baronet (1677–1724) of Broughton Hall, Staffordshire was a British politician who sat in the House of Commons from 1715 to 1724.

Broughton was born at Beaudesert, Staffordshire on 19 September 1677, the eldest surviving son of Sir Thomas Broughton, 2nd Baronet and his wife Rhoda Amcotts, daughter of John Amcotts of Aisthorpe, Lincolnshire. He was educated at Kensington and was admitted at Christ's College, Cambridge on 2 October 1695 and at Middle Temple on 30 July 1698. In 1699, he was awarded BA at Cambridge. He married Elizabeth Delves, daughter of Sir Thomas Delves, 4th Baronet, of Doddington, Cheshire on 10 February 1710, and succeeded to the baronetcy on the death of his father also in 1710.

Broughton was returned as a Whig Member of Parliament for Newcastle-under-Lyme on 2 June 1715 after a petition, having come third in the poll at the 1715 general election. He was returned unopposed for Newcastle-under-Lyme at the 1722 general election.

Broughton died on 12 September 1724, leaving two sons and two daughters. His eldest son Brian succeeded him in the baronetcy and also succeeded to the Doddington Park through his mother.

Parliament of Great Britain
Preceded by Henry Vernon; Rowland Cotton	Member of Parliament for Newcastle-under-Lyme; 1715–1724; With: Crewe Offley; Thomas Leveson-Gower	Succeeded by Sir Walter Bagot; Thomas Leveson-Gower
Baronetage of England
Preceded by Thomas Broughton	Baronet (of Broughton); 1710-1724	Succeeded by Brian Broughton-Delves
