= Samuel Rathbone Edge =

Samuel Rathbone Edge MP JP

Member of Parliament for Newcastle-under-Lyme
- In office 26 August 1878 – 31 March 1880 Serving with William Shepherd Allen
- Preceded by: William Shepherd Allen; Edmund Buckley
- Succeeded by: William Shepherd Allen; Charles Donaldson-Hudson

Personal details
- Born: 22 May 1848 Tunstall, Staffordshire
- Died: 27 September 1936 (aged 88)
- Party: Liberal
- Spouse: Eliza Marion Holden (m. 1888)
- Education: Queen's College, Oxford

Samuel Rathbone Edge (22 May 1848 – 27 September 1936) JP was a Liberal Party politician.

Edge was elected MP for the Newcastle-under-Lyme at a by-election in 1878. However, he lost the seat two years later at the 1880 general election.

Parliament of the United Kingdom
| Preceded by William Shepherd Allen; Edmund Buckley | Member of Parliament for Newcastle-under-Lymee; 1878–1880; With: William Shepherd Allen | Succeeded by William Shepherd Allen; Charles Donaldson-Hudson |
