= Richard Smith (died 1581) =

English politician

Richard Smith (by 1516 – buried on 22 May 1581) was an English politician.

He was Mayor of Newcastle-under-Lyme 1547–48 and 1549–50. He was a member (MP) of the parliament of England for Newcastle-under-Lyme in November 1554 and 1555.
