= Thomas Leveson-Gower =

English peer from the Leveson-Gower family

Hon. Thomas Leveson-Gower (6 May 1699 – 12 August 1727) was an English Tory politician from the Leveson-Gower family. He sat in parliament for Newcastle-under-Lyme from 1720 until his death.

He was the son of John Leveson-Gower, 1st Baron Gower (1675–1709) and Lady Catherine Manners (1675–1722), daughter of John Manners, 1st Duke of Rutland and his third wife, Catherine Noel. Three of his brothers also served in parliament: John Leveson-Gower, 1st Earl Gower (1694–1754), William Leveson-Gower (1697–1756), and Baptist Leveson-Gower (1701–1782).

Leveson-Gower was educated at Christ Church, Oxford. In the 1722 general election, he was returned unopposed, on his family's interest. In May 1725, he was chosen a member of the committee "to manage the evidence" against former Lord Chancellor Thomas Parker, 1st Earl of Macclesfield, during his impeachment trial for corruption.

He died unmarried.

Parliament of Great Britain
Preceded by Sir Brian Broughton; Crewe Offley	Member of Parliament for Newcastle-under-Lyme; 1722–1727; With: Sir Brian Broughton 1722–24; Sir Walter Bagot 1724–27	Succeeded by Baptist Leveson-Gower; John Ward
