= James Colyer =

Member of the Parliament of England

James Colyer (c. 1560 – 14 July 1597) was an English politician.

== Family ==
The Colyer family was well-established in the area around Stone, Staffordshire. After receiving lands during the dissolution of the monasteries, Colyer's father passed onto him the manors of Darlaston, Stone, Yerlett and Hilderstone. These included approximately 6500 acres of land. Colyer began to sell these soon after he inherited them in 1586. Within a year he sold a hundred houses and 1000 acres of land. It is unclear why he did so, but on his death, he left his nine-year-old son only the house of Newhall in Stone and three other small buildings.

== Career ==
He was a Member (MP) of the Parliament of England for Newcastle-under-Lyme in 1586. This was probably from his connection to the then Mayor of Newcastle-under-Lyme, Ralph Smythe, who was married to Colyer's sister. Colyer held no other significant office, but was made a freeman of Newcastle-under-Lyme in 1586.
