= Richard Leveson (1598–1661) =

English politician

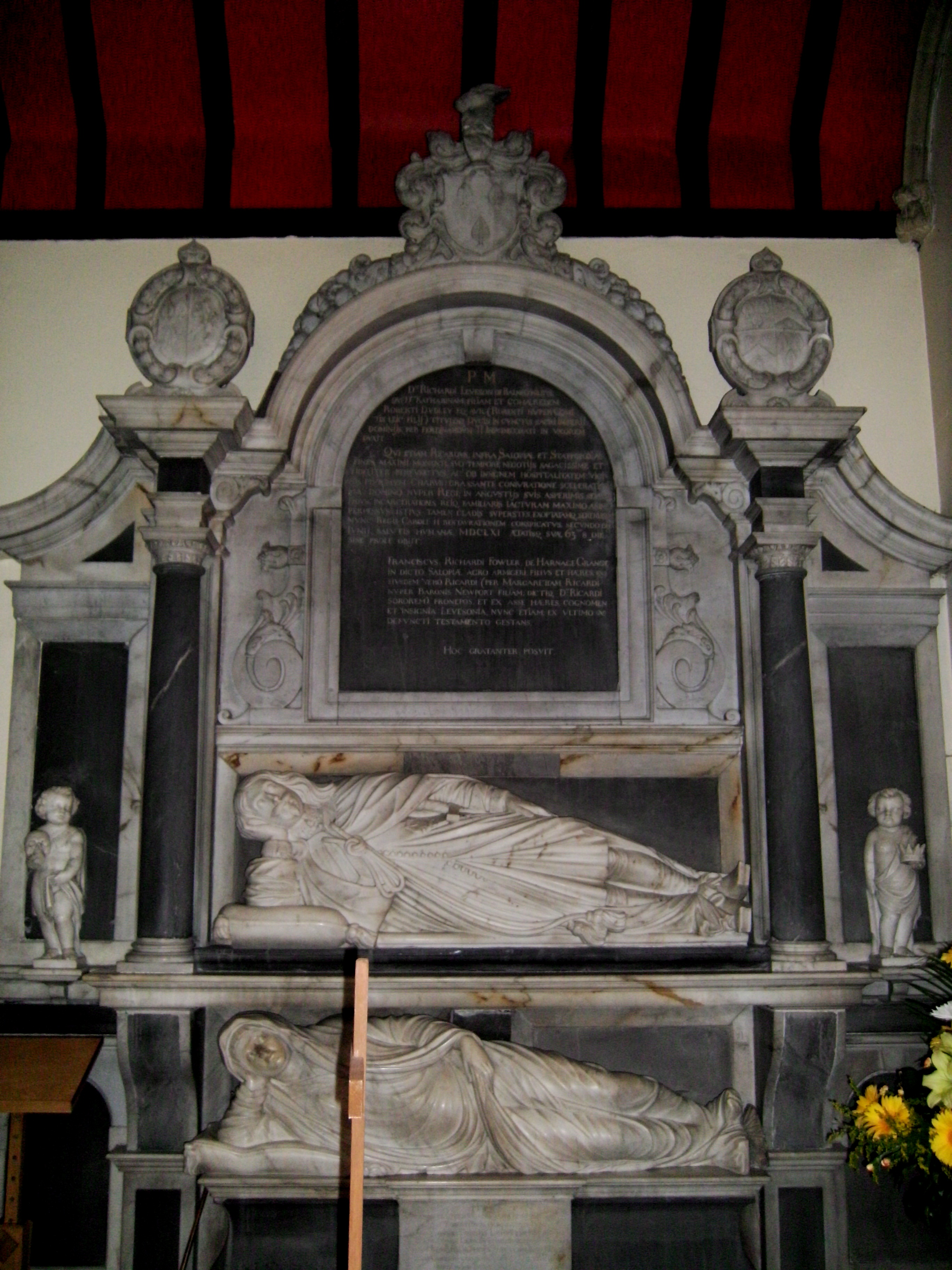
Memorial to Richard Leveson (1598–1661) and his wife Katherine Dudley. St Michael's church, Lilleshall, Shropshire

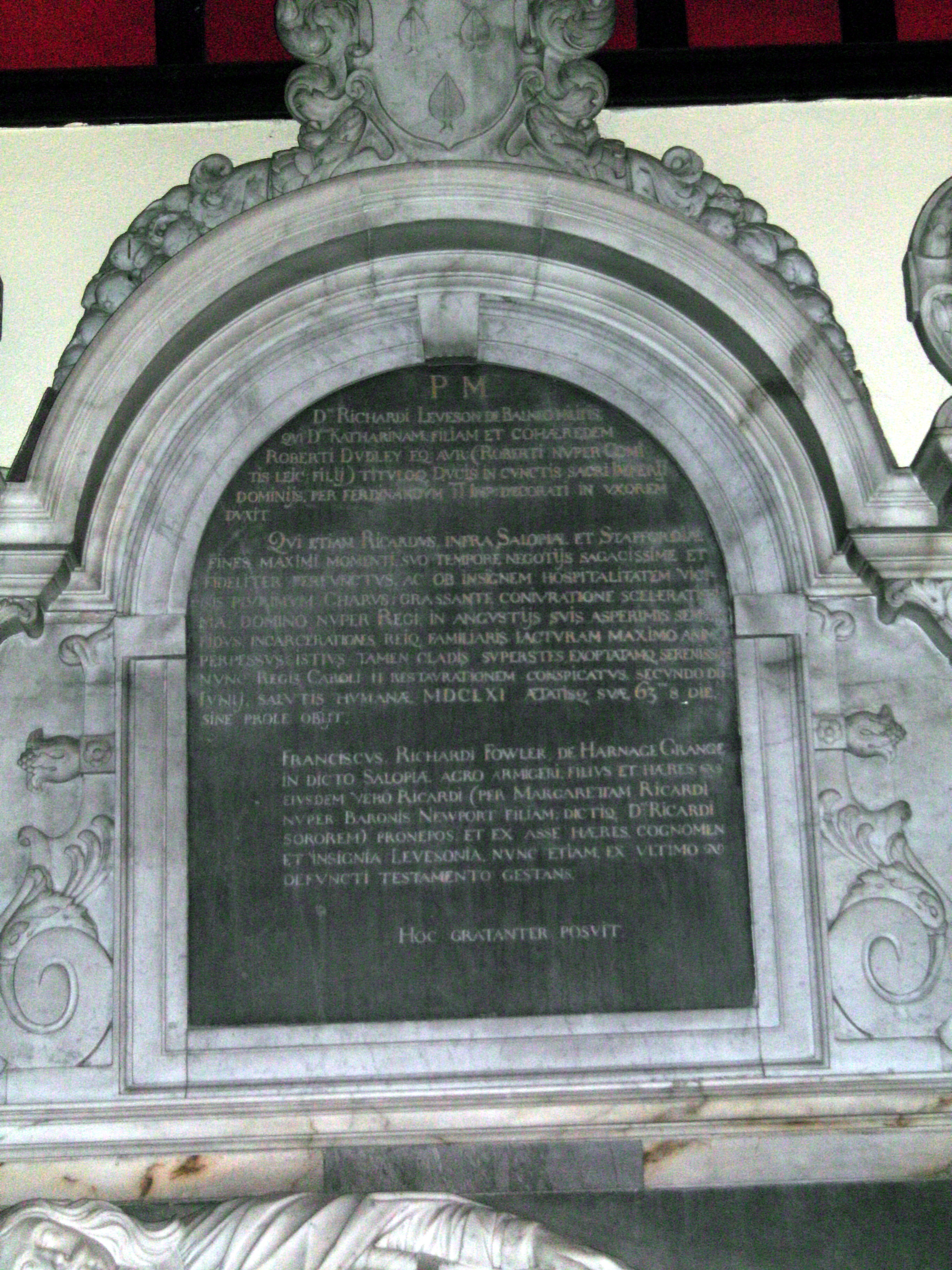
Inscription on the Leveson memorial

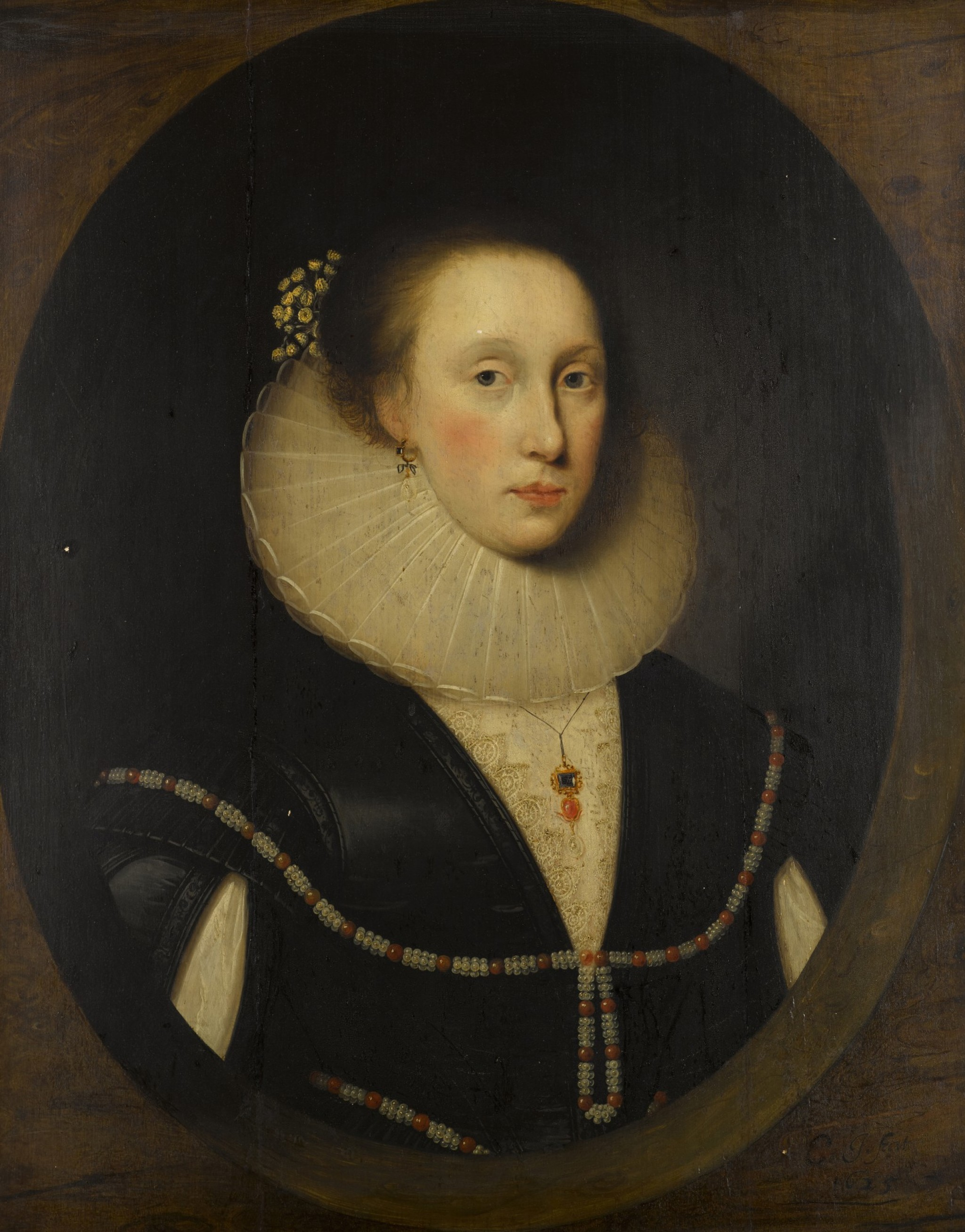
Portrait of Katherine Lady Leveson (1598–1674)

Sir Richard Leveson KB (25 May 1598 – 2 June 1661) was an English politician who sat in the House of Commons from 1640 to 1642. He supported the Royalist cause during the English Civil War.

Leveson was the second son of Sir John Leveson of Halling, Kent, and his second wife Christian Mildmay, daughter of Sir Walter Mildmay. In 1605 he inherited property in Trentham, Staffordshire and Lilleshall, Shropshire from his father's cousin Sir Richard Leveson, Vice-Admiral of England. Leveson's elder brother, John, who was intended to inherit his father's estates, died in 1612, three years before his father. Leveson therefore inherited his father’s estates in Kent as well as the Vice-Admiral's estates. He rebuilt the family seat at Trentham Hall between 1630 and 1638 at a cost of over £6,000. His Staffordshire relatives included Colonel Thomas Leveson, who held Dudley Castle for Charles I from 1643 to 1646, and was one of 25 former Royalists listed by Parliament in 1651 as subject to "perpetual banishment and confiscation".

He was made a Knight of the Bath at the coronation of Charles I in 1626. In November 1640, Leveson was elected Member of Parliament for Newcastle-under-Lyme in the Long Parliament. He encouraged Royalist support in Staffordshire and was disabled from sitting in parliament on 24 November 1642 for raising forces against parliament. From 1643 to 1645 he served in the royalist army as a colonel of horse. In 1645 Lilleshall Abbey fell to the parliamentary army and Leveson was imprisoned at the Parliamentary garrison in Nantwich. He suffered the diversion of most of the proceeds of his coal and lime workings to Parliament who also imposed a heavy fine, later reduced to £3,846.

After the restoration of Charles II, Leveson held command as a captain of volunteer horse in Staffordshire until his death at Lilleshall in 1661 aged 63. He was buried at St Michael's Church in Lilleshall.

Leveson married Katherine Dudley, daughter of Sir Robert Dudley: the couple had no children. Lady Katherine died in 1674, and in her will, endowed almshouses and an educational fund in Temple Balsall. The Lady Katherine Leveson Foundation continues to operate in the 21st century, with the care provider Lady Katherine Housing and Care as the successor to the almshouses, and the Lady Katherine Leveson C of E Primary School taking forward her educational charity. Lady Katharine Leveson also provided the funds for the restoration of Lichfield Cathedral.

Their co-heiresses were the two daughters of his elder brother John. One of them, Christian, married Sir Peter Temple of Stowe. A portrait of this Sir Richard Leveson seems to have found its way into the collection of paintings at Stowe House, Buckingham. A portrait of Sir Richard Leveson, said to be by van Dyck, belonged to the Duke of Sutherland in 1891. This portrait was purchased for £65 02s 00d from the sale of the possessions of the Dukes of Buckingham and Chandos held at Stowe House in 1848. It was described in the sale catalogue as by Van Dyck (whereas other paintings are described as "after Van Dyck" or a "copy of Van Dyck"). The catalogue records that Sir Richard is shown "in a black dress, with a frill" and that the painting was bought "after a very active competition".

Parliament of England
Preceded by Sir John Merrick; Richard Lloyd	Member of Parliament for Newcastle-under-Lyme; 1640–1642; With: Sir John Merrick	Succeeded by Sir John Merrick; Samuel Terrick
