= Newcastle-under-Lyme (constituency) =

Parliamentary constituency in the United Kingdom, 1885 onwards

Coordinates: 53.04°N 2.30°W

- County constituency for the House of Commons
- Boundaries since 2024
- Boundary of Newcastle-under-Lyme in West Midlands region
- County: Staffordshire
- Electorate: 70,025 (2023)
- Major settlements: Newcastle-under-Lyme, Keele and Audley

Current constituency
- Created: 1885
- Member of Parliament: Adam Jogee (Labour)
- Seats: One

1354–1885
- Seats: Two
- Type of constituency: Borough constituency

Newcastle-under-Lyme is a constituency (Note: A borough constituency (for the purposes of election expenses and type of returning officer)) in northern Staffordshire created in 1354 and represented in the House of Commons of the UK Parliament since 2024 by Adam Jogee of the Labour Party. (Note: As with all constituencies, the constituency elects one Member of Parliament (MP) by the first past the post system of election at least every five years.)

== Constituency profile ==
Newcastle-under-Lyme is a constituency in Staffordshire. It covers the large town of Newcastle-under-Lyme, which has a population of around 80,000, and the rural area to its west. This includes Madeley, Audley and other smaller villages.

Newcastle-under-Lyme is adjacent to the city of Stoke-on-Trent and forms part of its wider urban area. The town has an industrial history, with hatmaking, textile manufacturing and coal mining traditionally being the most important industries. The constituency has a large student population as the site of Keele University, which has around 14,000 students. The constituency has an overall average level of wealth; there is some deprivation in the centre of Newcastle-under-Lyme and some of its contiguous villages like Chesterton and Knutton, whilst the town's southern suburbs are affluent. House prices across the constituency are generally lower than the rest of the West Midlands region and the national average.

In general, residents of the constituency have average levels of education and homeownership. Rates of household income and child poverty are similar to national averages. A high proportion of residents work in the business administration, education and transport sectors, and the percentage claiming unemployment benefits is low. White people made up 92% of the population at the 2021 census.

At the local council level, most of the constituency is represented by Reform UK with some Conservative councillors in the town's southern suburbs. Voters in Newcastle-under-Lyme strongly supported leaving the European Union in the 2016 referendum; an estimated 61% voted in favour of Brexit compared to the nationwide figure of 52%.

== Boundaries ==
=== Historic ===
1885–1918: The existing parliamentary borough, so much of the municipal borough of Newcastle-under-Lyme as was not already included in the parliamentary borough, the local government district of Tunstall, and so much of the parish of Wolstanton as lay south of a line drawn along the centre of the road leading west from Chatterley railway station to the boundary of Audley parish.

1918–1950: The Municipal Borough of Newcastle-under-Lyme and the Urban Districts of Audley and Wolstanton United.

1950–1983: The Municipal Borough of Newcastle-under-Lyme and the Rural District of Newcastle-under-Lyme.

1983–2010: The Borough of Newcastle-under-Lyme wards of Audley and Bignall End, Bradwell, Chesterton, Clayton, Cross Heath, Halmerend, Holditch, Keele, May Bank, Porthill, Seabridge, Silverdale, Thistleberry, Town, Westlands and Wolstanton.

2010–2024: The Borough of Newcastle-under-Lyme wards of Audley and Bignall End; Bradwell; Chesterton; Clayton; Cross Heath; Halmerend; Holditch; Keele; Knutton and Silverdale; May Bank; Porthill; Seabridge; Silverdale and Parksite; Thistleberry; Town; Westlands; and Wolstanton.

Parliament accepted the Boundary Commission's Fifth Periodic Review of Westminster constituencies for the 2010 general election. The contents were changed to reflect the revised ward structure in the Borough, but the parliamentary boundaries were unchanged.

=== Current ===
Further to the 2023 Periodic Review of Westminster constituencies (in effect since 2024 general election), the constituency is composed of the following (as they existed on 1 December 2020):

- The Borough of Newcastle-under-Lyme wards of: Audley; Bradwell; Clayton; Crackley & Red Street; Cross Heath; Holditch & Chesterton; Keele; Knutton; Madeley & Betley; May Bank; Silverdale; Thistleberry; Town; Westbury Park & Northwood; Westlands; Wolstanton.

Minor boundary change including the addition of the village of Madeley from the (abolished constituency of Stone, in order to bring the electorate within the permitted range.

The constituency includes most of the Newcastle-under-Lyme borough, primarily comprising Newcastle-under-Lyme town and including the villages of Audley, Keele and Madeley.

== History ==
From its creation in 1354, Newcastle-under-Lyme returned two MPs to the House of Commons. Under the Redistribution of Seats Act 1885, the constituency's representation was cut to one member.

=== Prominent frontbenchers or members ===
Before the 20th century the constituency was often influenced and represented by members of the Leveson, Leveson-Gower (Note: Usually e.g. H. D. G. Leveson-Gower, Granville George Leveson-Gower) and related Egerton family who owned in this constituency the Trentham estate (Note: A series of marriages to heiresses by members of the Leveson-Gower family made the Dukes of Sutherland one of the richest landowning families in the Britain, they also owned Dunrobin Castle, Lancaster House as Stafford House and Stetchworth House.) - their most important MP was the Viscount Trentham who obtained a Dukedom (1st Duke of Sutherland).

Josiah Wedgwood of the pottery family was repeatedly elected to the seat from 1906. In 1919, he shifted his allegiance from the Liberal Party (the Lloyd George Coalition Liberals allying with the Conservatives) to the Labour Party; he was among many Liberals and their supporters deserting the party in or around 1918 due to the steering of David Lloyd George to the right and inviting Conservatives into government with him. He was ennobled to join the Lords in 1942, as 1st Baron Wedgwood, and campaigned in the United States for that country to join World War II and for Indian Independence.

== Results ==
Since Wedgwood joined the Independent Labour Party in 1919, the seat elected the Labour candidate at each election for the next hundred years, a total of 29 elections in succession. Labour came close to losing the seat in 1969, 1986, 2015 and 2017, and eventually lost the seat in 2019; the first time a member of the Conservative Party had represented the seat since it had been a dual-member borough before the 1885 general election which followed the Reform Act 1884 and the Redistribution of Seats Act 1885.

The 2015 result was the 9th-smallest majority of Labour's 232 seats by percentage of majority. Its 2017 general election result was the fifth-closest result overall and the second closest to being taken by the Conservatives, a winning margin of 30 votes (behind Dudley North, where the result was a Labour majority of 22 votes).

In 2019, it was finally won by the Conservatives for the first time since it became a single-member seat, by over 7,000 votes. It was one of the twelve Staffordshire seats (100%) won (held or gained) by Conservative candidates. However, Labour regained the seat at the 2024 election with a majority of just over 5,000.

=== Results of candidates of other parties ===
In 2015 one of four other parties' candidates standing, UKIP's Wood, won more than 5% of the vote in 2015 therefore keeping his deposit, the party which campaigned consistently for the public vote for leaving the European Union in 2016. In 2017 the three largest British parties fielded candidates only — Labour, Conservative and Liberal Democrat candidates in order of votes won.

=== Turnout since 1945 ===
Turnout has ranged from 87.6% in 1950 to 58.4% in 2024.

=== 2017 election issues ===
In the 2017 election, 1,500 eligible voters were turned away while 2 ineligible voters were able to vote. An independent report by Andrew Scallan found a "complex picture of administrative mistakes around registration and postal voting processes", and because of the small margin of victory (30 votes) concluded that "it is impossible to have absolute confidence that the result... reflects the will of the electorate."

=== 2024 election ===
On 31 May Aaron Bell announced that he would not be standing again for Newcastle-under-Lyme at the 2024 General Election. He announced the news on Facebook with an open letter in which he said 'It is with a heavy heart that I have decided not to contest the forthcoming general election for personal and family reasons'.

== Members of Parliament ==
=== MPs 1353–1509 ===
Where the name of the member has not yet been ascertained or is not recorded in a surviving document, the entry unknown is entered in the table.

- Before 1354 No records
- 1354 John Lagowe and Richard de Lavendene
- 1355 John de Blorton and Richard de Podmore
- 1358 Richard de Podmore and William de Homersley
- 1360 William Gent and Richard de Colclough
- 1361 William Gent and Richard de Podmore
- 1362 Richard de Podmore and Thomas de Wodhull
- 1363 Richard de Lavendene and John de Lylsull
- 1365 Thomas de Wodhull and Richard de Podmore
- 1366 Richard de Podmore and Thomas de Wodhull
- 1369 Richard de Lavendene, Roger Letys
- 1371 Roger Letys and Richard Lavendene
- 1372 Edmund Toly and Thomas Colclough
- 1373 Thomas de Wodhull and Roger del Castell
- 1377 Richard Buntable and Thomas Thicknesse
- 1377 Thomas de Podmore and Henry de Erdeleye
- 1378 Thomas de Podmore and William Thickness
- 1379 No records
- 1380 John Kene and William Thickness
- 1381-1382 Thomas Podmore and Thomas Hap
- 1382 Thomas Thicknesse and John Thykenesse
- 1382 William Thickness and Henry de Kele
- 1383 Thomas Thicknesse and William de Brompton
- 1383 Thomas Thicknesse and Thomas de Podmore
- 1384 William Thickness and Ralf de la Hogh
- 1384 John Colclough and William Colclough
- 1385 William Colclough and Ralf de la Hogh
- 1386 William Colclough and Ralf Hogh
- 1388 William Thickness and John Kene
- 1388 William Thickness and Thomas de Thikenes
- 1390 John Colclough and William Colclough
- 1391 Thomas Thicknesse and Ralf de la Hogh
- 1393 Ralf Hogh, John Cook
- 1394 No records
- 1395 William Colclough and Ralf Hogh
- 1397 William Colclough and Thomas Thicknesse
- 1397-1398 No records
- 1399 Thomas Podmore and Thomas Thicknesse
- 1402 John Joce and Thomas Joce
- 1406 Richard Fyton and William Lee II
- 1407 Hugh Colclough and John Tatenhale
- 1410 ? possibly John Delves was an MP representing the county or a borough
- 1411 Thomas Thicknesse and William Bowyer
- 1413 (1) ? possibly Newport, or Robert Bapthorpe was an MP representing the county or a borough
- 1413 (2) William de Lee and Hugh Wyldeblood
- 1416 William Skytteby, Thomas Chamberleyn
- 1419 John Biddulph (Bedulf), John Miners
- 1420 Hugo de Stanford and John Hardhed
- 1421 John Biddulph (Bydulf) and Thomas Baron
- 1421 Hugh Stanford and Thomas Lee
- 1422 John Myners and Hugh Stanford
- 1423-1424 Hugh Stanford and William Sandbache
- 1425 John Wood and William Hextall
- 1426 Robert Wodehous and Henry Lilie
- 1427-1428 John Wood and Thomas Lee
- 1429-1430 William Egerton and William Hextall
- 1431 John Wood and Roger Legh
- 1432 James Leveson and John Wood
- 1433 John Wood and Thomas Podmore
- 1435 Richard Bruyn and William Hextall
- 1437 Thomas Preston and Nicholas Repynghale
- 1442 John Nedham and William Cumberford of Cumberford
- 1447 John Nedham and John Cudworth
- 1449 John Nedham and Thomas Everdon
- 1449-1450 Ralf Wolseley and Thomas Mayne
- 1450-1451 Thomas Colclogh and Richard Mosley
- 1453-1434 Thomas Colcloghe and John Spenser
- 1455-1456 John Spenser and Richard Mosley
- 1467-1468 James Norys and Robert Hille
- 1472-1475 William Paston and John Wood
- 1477-1478 William Yonge and Reynold Bray
- 1491-1492 Richard Harpur and Richard Blunt
- 1495-1496 ? Sir Reynold Bray
- 1497 County or a borough - ?Richard Wrottesley, ?Humphrey Peshale,?Thomas Welles
- 1504 unknown

=== Burgesses in the English Parliament 1510–1707 ===
As there were sometimes significant gaps between Parliaments held in this period, the dates of first assembly and dissolution are given.

The Roman numerals after some names are those used in The House of Commons 1509-1558 and The House of Commons 1558-1603 to distinguish a member from another politician of the same name.

Elected	Assembled	Dissolved	First member	Second member
1510	21 January 1510	23 February 1510	John Welles	William Pury
1512	4 February 1512	4 March 1514	John Welles	Thomas Rider
1515	5 February 1515	22 December 1515	John Welles	Thomas Rider
1523	15 April 1523	13 August 1523	unknown	unknown
1529	3 November 1529	14 April 1536	John Persall	Richard Grey
1536	8 June 1536	18 July 1536	unknown	unknown
1539	28 April 1539	24 July 1540	unknown	unknown
1542	16 January 1542	28 March 1544	Harry Broke	John Smith
1545	23 November 1545	31 January 1547	Humphrey Welles	Harry Broke
1547	4 November 1547	15 April 1552	James Rolston	William Layton (died); Alexander Walker in place of Layton
1553	1 March 1553	31 March 1553	Roger Fowke	John Smyth
1553	5 October 1553	5 December 1553	Roger Fowke	James Rolston
1554	2 April 1554	3 May 1554	James Rolleston	Francis Moore
1554	12 November 1554	16 January 1555	Sir Ralph Bagnall	Richard Smyth
1555	21 October 1555	9 December 1555	Sir Richard Bagnall (properly Sir Nicholas Bagenal)	Richard Smyth
14 January 1558	20 January 1558	17 November 1558	Richard Hussey	Thomas Egerton
5 January 1559	23 January 1559	8 May 1559	Sir Nicholas Bagenal	Walter Blount
1562 or 1563	11 January 1563	2 January 1567	Sir Ralph Bagnall	John Long
1571	2 April 1571	29 May 1571	Sir Ralph Bagnall	Ralph Bourchier
12 April 1572	8 May 1572	19 April 1583	Ralph Bourchier	Thomas Grimsdiche
16 November 1584	23 November 1584	14 September 1585	Peter Warburton	Walter Chetwynd
28 September 1586	13 October 1586	23 March 1587	James Colyer	Walter Chetwynd
10 October 1588	4 February 1589	29 March 1589	Thomas Humphrey	Francis Angier
1593	18 February 1593	10 April 1593	John James	Thomas Fitzherbert
16 October 1597	24 October 1597	9 February 1598	Sir Walter Leveson	John Bowyer
1 October 1601	27 October 1601	19 December 1601	Edward Mainwaring	Thomas Trentham
1603 [sic]	19 March 1604	9 February 1611	Sir Walter Chetwynd	John Bowyer (replaced in by-election 1605 by Rowland Cotton)
1614	5 April 1614	7 June 1614	Edward Wymarke	Robert Needham, 2nd Viscount Kilmorey
1621	16 January 1621	8 February 1622	Sir John Davies	Edward Kerton
1624	12 February 1624	27 March 1625	Sir Edward Vere (disabled, replaced April 1624 by Charles Glemham	Richard Leveson
1625	17 May 1625	12 August 1625	Edward Mainwaring	John Keeling
1626	6 February 1626	15 June 1626	Sir John Skeffington	John Keeling
1628	17 March 1628	10 March 1629	Sir George Gresley, 1st Baronet	Sir Rowland Cotton
No parliament held
1640	13 April 1640	5 May 1640	Sir John Merrick (Country)	Richard Lloyd (Court)
1640	3 November 1640	5 December 1648	Sir Richard Leveson (Royalist) (until 1643) replaced by Samuel Terrick (Parl.)	Sir John Merrick (Parl.)
N/A	6 December 1648 (Note: Date of Pride's Purge, which converted the Long Parliament into the Rump Parliament)	20 April 1653 (Note: Date when Oliver Cromwell dissolved the Rump Parliament by force.)	unrepresented	
N/A (Note: Date when the members of the nominated or Barebones Parliament were selected at a "Convention". The parliamentary borough of Newcastle-under-Lyme was not represented in this body.)	4 July 1653	12 December 1653	unrepresented	
1654 (Note: Date when the members of the First Protectorate Parliament were elected. The parliamentary borough was represented in this body.)	3 September 1654	22 January 1655	Edward Keeling	
1656 (Note: Date when the members of the Second Protectorate Parliament were elected. The parliamentary borough was entitled to be represented in this body.)	17 September 1656	4 February 1658	John Bowyer (never sat)	
1659	27 January 1659	22 April 1659	Edward Keeling	Tobias Bridge
N/A (Note: The Rump Parliament was recalled and subsequently Pride's Purge was reversed, allowing the full Long Parliament to meet until it agreed to dissolve itself.)	7 May 1659	20 February 1660	unknown	unknown

=== MPs 1660–1885 ===
Election	First member	First party	Second member	Second party
1660	John Bowyer		Samuel Terrick	
1661	Sir Caesar Colclough		Edward Mainwaring	
1675	Sir Caesar Colclough		William Leveson-Gower	
1679	Sir Thomas Bellot, Bt		William Leveson-Gower	
1685	Edward Mainwaring		William Sneyd	
1689	Sir William Leveson-Gower		John Lawton	
1690	Sir William Leveson-Gower		Sir Thomas Bellot, Bt	
1692	Sir John Leveson-Gower, later 1st Lord Gower		Sir Thomas Bellot, Bt	
1695	Sir John Leveson-Gower, later 1st Lord Gower		John Lawton	
1698	Sir John Leveson-Gower, later 1st Lord Gower		Sir Thomas Bellot, Bt	
1699	Sir John Leveson-Gower, later 1st Lord Gower		Rowland Cotton	Tory
1702	John Offley Crewe		Rowland Cotton	Tory
1705 (Note: The MPs of the last Parliament of England and 45 members co-opted from the former Parliament of Scotland, became the House of Commons of the 1st Parliament of Great Britain which assembled on 23 October 1707 (see below for the members in that Parliament).)	John Offley Crewe		Sir Thomas Bellot, Bt	Tory
1706	Crewe Offley		John Lawton	
1708	Sir Thomas Bellot, 3rd Baronet	Tory	Rowland Cotton	Tory
1709	Crewe Offley	Whig	John Lawton	
1710	William Burslem		Rowland Cotton	Tory
Jan 1715	Henry Vernon		Rowland Cotton	Tory
1715	Sir Brian Broughton		Crewe Offley	Whig
1722	Sir Brian Broughton		Thomas Leveson-Gower	
1724 by-election	Sir Walter Bagot		Thomas Leveson-Gower	
1727	Baptist Leveson-Gower		John Ward	
1734	Baptist Leveson-Gower		John Lawton II	
1740 by-election	Baptist Leveson-Gower		Randle Wilbraham	
1747	Baptist Leveson-Gower		Viscount Parker	
1754	Baptist Leveson-Gower		John Waldegrave	
1761	Henry Vernon II		John Waldegrave	
1762 by-election	Sir Lawrence Dundas, Bt		John Waldegrave	
1763 by-election	Sir Lawrence Dundas, Bt		Thomas Gilbert	
Mar 1768	John Wrottesley, later 8th Bt		Alexander Forrester	
May 1768 by-election	Sir George Hay		Alexander Forrester	
1774	Sir George Hay		George Waldegrave, Viscount Chewton	
1779 by-election	George Leveson-Gower, Viscount Trentham		George Waldegrave, Viscount Chewton	
1780	George Leveson-Gower, Viscount Trentham		Sir Archibald Macdonald	
1784	Richard Vernon		Sir Archibald Macdonald	
1790	John Leveson-Gower		Sir Archibald Macdonald	
1792 by-election	William Egerton		Sir Archibald Macdonald	
1793 by-election	William Egerton		Sir Francis Ford	
1796	William Egerton		Edward Bootle-Wilbraham	
1802	Sir Robert Lawley		Edward Bootle-Wilbraham	
1806	James Macdonald		Edward Bootle-Wilbraham	
1812	Earl Gower	Whig	Sir John Boughey, Bt	Whig
1815 by-election	Sir John Chetwode	Tory	Sir John Boughey, Bt	Whig
1818	William Shepherd Kinnersley	Tory	Robert Wilmot-Horton	Whig
1823 by-election	Evelyn Denison	Whig	Robert Wilmot-Horton	Whig
1826	Richardson Borradaile	Tory	Robert Wilmot-Horton	Whig
1830	Richardson Borradaile	Tory	William Henry Miller	Whig
1831	Edmund Peel	Tory	William Henry Miller	Tory
1832	Sir Henry Willoughby	Tory	William Henry Miller	Tory
1834	Sir Henry Willoughby	Conservative	William Henry Miller	Conservative
1835	Edmund Peel	Conservative	William Henry Miller	Conservative
1837	Spencer Horsey de Horsey	Conservative	William Henry Miller	Conservative
1841	Edmund Buckley	Conservative	John Quincey Harris	Whig
1842 by-election	Edmund Buckley	Conservative	John Campbell Colquhoun	Conservative
1847	Samuel Christy	Peelite	William Jackson	Whig
1859	William Murray	Conservative	William Jackson	Liberal
1865	William Shepherd Allen	Liberal	Sir Edmund Buckley, Bt	Conservative
1878 by-election	William Shepherd Allen	Liberal	Samuel Rathbone Edge	Liberal
1880	William Shepherd Allen	Liberal	Charles Donaldson-Hudson	Conservative
1885	representation reduced to one member by the Redistribution of Seats Act			

=== MPs since 1885 ===
Year	Member	Party
1885	William Shepherd Allen	Liberal
1886	Douglas Coghill	Liberal Unionist
1892	William Allen	Liberal
1900	Sir Alfred Seale Haslam	Liberal Unionist
1906	Josiah Wedgwood	Liberal
1918	Josiah Wedgwood	Ind. Liberal
1919	Josiah Wedgwood	Labour
1931	Josiah Wedgwood	Ind. Labour
1935	Josiah Wedgwood	Labour
1942 by-election	John Mack	Labour
1951	Stephen Swingler	Labour
1969 by-election	John Golding	Labour
1986 by-election	Llin Golding	Labour
2001	Paul Farrelly	Labour
2019	Aaron Bell	Conservative
2024	Adam Jogee	Labour

== Elections ==
=== Elections in the 2020s ===
General election 2024: Newcastle-under-Lyme
Party	Candidate	Votes	%	±%
Labour	Adam Jogee	15,992	40.4	+5.0
Conservative	Simon Tagg	10,923	27.6	−25.2
Reform	Neill Walker	8,865	22.4	+18.3
Liberal Democrats	Nigel Jones	1,987	5.0	−0.6
Green	Jennifer Hibell	1,851	4.7	+2.5
Majority		5,069	12.8	N/A
Turnout		39,618	58.4	−9.2
Labour gain from Conservative		Swing	+15.1	

=== Elections in the 2010s ===
General election 2019: Newcastle-under-Lyme
Party	Candidate	Votes	%	±%
Conservative	Aaron Bell	23,485	52.5	▲4.4
Labour	Carl Greatbatch	16,039	35.9	▼12.3
Liberal Democrats	Nigel Jones	2,361	5.3	▲1.5
Brexit Party	Jason Cooper	1,921	4.3	New
Green	Carl Johnson	933	2.1	New
Majority		7,446	16.6	N/A
Turnout		44,879	65.8	▼1.1
Conservative gain from Labour		Swing	▲8.35	

General election 2017: Newcastle-under-Lyme
Party	Candidate	Votes	%	±%
Labour	Paul Farrelly	21,124	48.2	▲9.8
Conservative	Owen Meredith	21,094	48.1	▲11.2
Liberal Democrats	Nigel Jones	1,624	3.8	▼0.4
Majority		30	0.1	▼1.4
Turnout		43,842	66.9	▲4.3
Labour hold		Swing	▼0.7	

General election 2015: Newcastle-under-Lyme
Party	Candidate	Votes	%	±%
Labour	Paul Farrelly	16,520	38.4	▲0.4
Conservative	Tony Cox	15,870	36.9	▲2.5
UKIP	Phil Wood	7,252	16.9	▲8.8
Liberal Democrats	Ian Wilkes	1,826	4.2	▼15.4
Green	Sam Gibbons	1,246	2.9	New
Independent	David Nixon	283	0.7	New
Majority		650	1.5	▼2.1
Turnout		42,997	62.6	▲0.4
Labour hold		Swing	▼1.5	

General election 2010: Newcastle-under-Lyme
Party	Candidate	Votes	%	±%
Labour	Paul Farrelly	16,393	38.0	▼7.4
Conservative	Robert Jenrick	14,841	34.4	▲9.4
Liberal Democrats	Nigel Jones	8,466	19.6	▲0.7
UKIP	David Nixon	3,491	8.1	▲4.5
Majority		1,552	3.6	▼16.8
Turnout		43,191	62.2	▲0.6
Labour hold		Swing	▼8.4	

=== Elections in the 2000s ===
General election 2005: Newcastle-under-Lyme
Party	Candidate	Votes	%	±%
Labour	Paul Farrelly	18,053	45.4	−8.0
Conservative	Jeremy Lefroy	9,945	25.0	−2.6
Liberal Democrats	Trevor Johnson	7,528	18.9	+3.4
UKIP	David Nixon	1,436	3.6	+2.1
BNP	John Dawson	1,390	3.5	New
Green	Andrew Dobson	918	2.3	New
Veritas	Marian Harvey-Lover	518	1.3	New
Majority		8,108	20.4	−5.4
Turnout		39,788	61.6	+2.8
Labour hold		Swing	-2.7	

General election 2001: Newcastle-under-Lyme
Party	Candidate	Votes	%	±%
Labour	Paul Farrelly	20,650	53.4	−3.1
Conservative	Michael Flynn	10,664	27.6	+6.1
Liberal Democrats	Jerry Roodhouse	5,993	15.5	+1.5
Independent	Robert Fyson	773	2.0	New
UKIP	Paul Godfrey	594	1.5	New
Majority		9,986	25.8	−9.2
Turnout		38,674	58.8	−14.8
Labour hold		Swing	-4.6	

=== Elections in the 1990s ===
General election 1997: Newcastle-under-Lyme
Party	Candidate	Votes	%	±%
Labour	Llin Golding	27,743	56.5	+8.6
Conservative	Marcus Hayes	10,537	21.5	−8.1
Liberal Democrats	Robin Studd	6,858	14.0	−7.9
Referendum	Kim Suttle	1,510	3.1	New
Liberal	Steven Mountford	1,399	2.9	New
Socialist Labour	Bridget Bell	1,082	2.2	New
Majority		17,206	35.0	+16.7
Turnout		49,129	73.6	−7.2
Labour hold		Swing		

General election 1992: Newcastle-under-Lyme
Party	Candidate	Votes	%	±%
Labour	Llin Golding	25,652	47.9	+7.4
Conservative	Andrew Brierley	15,813	29.6	+1.7
Liberal Democrats	Alan Thomas	11,727	21.9	−9.0
Natural Law	Richard Lines	314	0.6	New
Majority		9,839	18.3	+8.7
Turnout		53,506	80.8	0.0
Labour hold		Swing	+2.9	

=== Elections in the 1980s ===
General election 1987: Newcastle-under-Lyme
Party	Candidate	Votes	%	±%
Labour	Llin Golding	21,618	40.5	−1.5
Liberal	Alan Thomas	16,486	30.9	+9.3
Conservative	Peter Ridway	14,863	27.9	−8.5
Ex Labour Moderate	Michael Nicklin	397	0.7	New
Majority		5,132	9.6	+4.0
Turnout		53,364	80.8	+3.5
Labour hold		Swing		

- Resignation of John Golding on 24 June 1986, upon appointment as General Secretary of the National Communications Union.

1986 Newcastle-under-Lyme by-election
Party	Candidate	Votes	%	±%
Labour	Llin Golding	16,819	40.8	−1.2
Liberal	Alan Thomas	16,020	38.8	+17.2
Conservative	James Nock	7,863	19.0	−17.4
Monster Raving Loony	David Sutch	277	0.7	New
Independent	John Gaskell	115	0.3	New
Independent	James Parker	83	0.2	New
Independent	David Brewster	70	0.2	New
Majority		799	2.0	−3.6
Turnout		41,247	62.2	−15.1
Labour hold		Swing		
Registered electors		66,353		

General election 1983: Newcastle-under-Lyme
Party	Candidate	Votes	%	±%
Labour	John Golding	21,210	42.0	−6.5
Conservative	Leslie Lawrence	18,406	36.4	−4.9
Liberal	Alan Thomas	10,916	21.6	+11.6
Majority		2,804	5.6	−1.6
Turnout		50,532	77.3	−4.3
Labour hold		Swing		

=== Elections in the 1970s ===
General election 1979: Newcastle-under-Lyme
Party	Candidate	Votes	%	±%
Labour	John Golding	28,649	48.5	−1.1
Conservative	E Ashley	24,421	41.3	+4.7
Liberal	G Evans	5,878	10.0	−3.4
British Socialist Empire	S Rowe	156	0.3	New
Majority		4,228	7.2	−6.8
Turnout		59,104	81.6	+3.6
Labour hold		Swing		

General election October 1974: Newcastle-under-Lyme
Party	Candidate	Votes	%	±%
Labour	John Golding	28,154	49.6	+2.4
Conservative	Nicholas Bonsor	20,784	36.6	−1.3
Liberal	R Fyson	7,604	13.4	−1.2
UK Front	S Rowe	256	0.5	+0.1
Majority		7,370	13.0	+3.7
Turnout		56,798	78.0	−6.1
Labour hold		Swing		

General election February 1974: Newcastle-under-Lyme
Party	Candidate	Votes	%	±%
Labour	John Golding	28,603	47.2	−1.7
Conservative	Nicholas Bonsor	22,955	37.9	−6.4
Liberal	R Fyson	8,861	14.6	+10.3
UK Front	S Rowe	228	0.4	New
Majority		5,648	9.3	+4.7
Turnout		61,647	84.1	+18.6
Labour hold		Swing		

General election 1970: Newcastle-under-Lyme
Party	Candidate	Votes	%	±%
Labour	John Golding	22,329	48.9	−12.9
Conservative	Nicholas Winterton	20,223	44.3	+6.1
Liberal	Derek Wright	1,954	4.3	N/A
Democratic Party	Peter Boyle	1,194	2.61	N/A
Majority		2,106	4.6	−19.0
Turnout		45,700	65.5	−14.4
Labour hold		Swing		

=== Elections in the 1960s ===
By-election 1969: Newcastle-under-Lyme
Party	Candidate	Votes	%	±%
Labour	John Golding	21,786	46.1	−15.7
Conservative	Nicholas Winterton	20,744	43.9	+5.7
Liberal	David Spreckley	2,999	6.4	New
Democratic Party	D Parker	1,699	3.6	New
Majority		1,042	2.2	−21.4
Turnout		47,228	72.3	−7.6
Labour hold		Swing		

General election 1966: Newcastle-under-Lyme
Party	Candidate	Votes	%	±%
Labour	Stephen Swingler	31,548	61.8	+3.8
Conservative	Peggy Fenner	19,497	38.2	−3.8
Majority		12,051	23.6	+7.6
Turnout		51,045	79.9	−2.3
Labour hold		Swing		

General election 1964: Newcastle-under-Lyme
Party	Candidate	Votes	%	±%
Labour	Stephen Swingler	30,470	58.0	+2.4
Conservative	John Lovering	22,073	42.0	−2.4
Majority		8,397	16.0	+4.8
Turnout		52,543	82.2	−2.2
Labour hold		Swing		

=== Elections in the 1950s ===
General election 1959: Newcastle-under-Lyme
Party	Candidate	Votes	%	±%
Labour	Stephen Swingler	29,840	55.6	−1.2
Conservative	Thomas Prendergast	23,838	44.4	+1.2
Majority		6,002	11.2	−2.4
Turnout		53,678	84.4	+3.6
Labour hold		Swing		

General election 1955: Newcastle-under-Lyme
Party	Candidate	Votes	%	±%
Labour	Stephen Swingler	28,314	56.8	−1.2
Conservative	Frank Taylor	21,569	43.2	+1.2
Majority		6,745	13.6	−2.4
Turnout		49,883	80.8	−6.7
Labour hold		Swing		

General election 1951: Newcastle-under-Lyme
Party	Candidate	Votes	%	±%
Labour	Stephen Swingler	30,814	58.0	+0.2
Conservative	James Friend	22,278	42.0	−0.2
Majority		8,536	16.0	+0.4
Turnout		53,092	87.5	−0.1
Labour hold		Swing		

General election 1950: Newcastle-under-Lyme
Party	Candidate	Votes	%	±%
Labour	John Mack	30,249	57.8	−8.4
Conservative	James Friend	22,132	42.2	+20.8
Majority		8,117	15.6	−29.2
Turnout		52,381	87.6	+10.5
Labour hold		Swing		

=== Elections in the 1940s ===
General election 1945: Newcastle-under-Lyme
Party	Candidate	Votes	%	±%
Labour	John Mack	25,903	66.2	N/A
Conservative	George Wade	8,380	21.4	New
Liberal	Norman Elliott	4,838	12.4	New
Majority		17,523	44.8	N/A
Turnout		39,121	77.1	N/A
Labour hold		Swing		

1942 Newcastle-under-Lyme by-election
Party	Candidate	Votes	%	±%
Labour	John Mack	Unopposed	N/A	N/A
Labour hold				

=== Elections in the 1930s ===
General election 1935: Newcastle-under-Lyme
Party	Candidate	Votes	%	±%
Labour	Josiah Wedgwood	Unopposed	N/A	N/A
Labour gain from Independent Labour				

Wedgwood

General election 1931: Newcastle-under-Lyme
Party	Candidate	Votes	%	±%
Independent Labour	Josiah Wedgwood	Unopposed	N/A	N/A
Independent Labour gain from Labour				

=== Elections in the 1920s ===
General election 1929: Newcastle-under-Lyme
Party	Candidate	Votes	%	±%
Labour	Josiah Wedgwood	20,931	69.9	+12.2
Unionist	Christopher Kemplay Tatham	9,011	30.1	−12.2
Majority		11,920	39.8	+24.4
Turnout		29,942	75.8	−4.2
Registered electors		39,482		
Labour hold		Swing	+12.2	

General election 1924: Newcastle-under-Lyme
Party	Candidate	Votes	%	±%
Labour	Josiah Wedgwood	14,226	57.7	−7.9
Unionist	A. Hassam	10,425	42.3	+7.9
Majority		3,801	15.4	−15.8
Turnout		24,651	80.0	+15.8
Registered electors		30,816		
Labour hold		Swing	−7.9	

General election 1923: Newcastle-under-Lyme
Party	Candidate	Votes	%	±%
Labour	Josiah Wedgwood	12,881	65.6	+5.4
Unionist	John Ravenshaw	6,746	34.4	New
Majority		6,135	31.2	+10.8
Turnout		19,627	64.2	−15.3
Registered electors		30,565		
Labour hold		Swing	N/A	

General election 1922: Newcastle-under-Lyme
Party	Candidate	Votes	%	±%
Labour	Josiah Wedgwood	14,503	60.2	N/A
National Liberal	Albert Shaw	9,573	39.8	New
Majority		4,930	20.4	N/A
Turnout		24,076	79.5	N/A
Registered electors		30,300		
Labour gain from Independent Liberal		Swing	N/A	

== Election results 1868-1918 ==
=== Elections in the 1860s ===
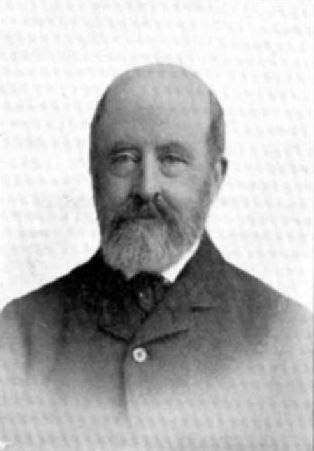
Allen

General election 1868: Newcastle-under-Lyme (2 seats)
Party	Candidate	Votes	%	±%
Conservative	Edmund Buckley	1,423	43.8	+1.9
Liberal	William Shepherd Allen	1,081	33.3	−10.8
Liberal	Henry Thomas Salmon	744	22.9	+8.8
Majority		679	20.9	−6.9
Turnout		2,340 (est)	82.0 (est)	−12.2
Registered electors		2,849		
Conservative hold		Swing	+2.0	
Liberal hold		Swing	−6.4	

=== Elections in the 1870s ===
General election 1874: Newcastle-under-Lyme (2 seats)
Party	Candidate	Votes	%	±%
Conservative	Edmund Buckley	1,173	35.3	+13.4
Liberal	William Shepherd Allen	1,116	33.6	−22.6
Conservative	Harry Davenport	1,037	31.2	+9.3
Turnout		2,221 (est)	74.1 (est)	−7.9
Registered electors		2,999		
Majority		57	1.7	−19.2
Conservative hold		Swing	+12.4	
Majority		79	2.4	N/A
Liberal hold		Swing	−22.7	

Buckley resigned, causing a by-election.

1878 Newcastle-under-Lyme by-election (1 seat)
Party	Candidate	Votes	%	±%
Liberal	Samuel Rathbone Edge	1,330	57.3	+23.7
Conservative	Charles Donaldson-Hudson	990	42.7	−23.8
Majority		340	14.6	N/A
Turnout		2,320	68.3	−5.8
Registered electors		3,396		
Liberal gain from Conservative		Swing	+23.8	

=== Elections in the 1880s ===
General election 1880: Newcastle-under-Lyme (2 seats)
Party	Candidate	Votes	%	±%
Conservative	Charles Donaldson-Hudson	1,484	37.9	−28.6
Liberal	William Shepherd Allen	1,252	32.0	+15.2
Liberal	Samuel Rathbone Edge	1,175	30.0	+13.2
Majority		232	5.9	+4.2
Turnout		2,736 (est)	84.6 (est)	+10.5
Registered electors		3,235		
Conservative hold		Swing	−13.8	
Liberal hold		Swing	+14.8	

Scoble

General election 1885: Newcastle-under-Lyme (1 seat)
Party	Candidate	Votes	%	±%
Liberal	William Shepherd Allen	4,031	58.6	−3.4
Conservative	Andrew Scoble	2,848	41.4	+3.5
Majority		1,183	17.2	N/A
Turnout		6,879	87.8	+3.2 (est)
Registered electors		7,837		
Liberal hold		Swing	+3.5	

Coghill

General election 1886: Newcastle-under-Lyme
Party	Candidate	Votes	%	±%
Liberal Unionist	Douglas Coghill	2,896	51.3	+9.9
Liberal	John Beavis Brindley	2,752	48.7	−9.9
Majority		144	2.6	N/A
Turnout		5,648	72.1	−15.7
Registered electors		7,837		
Liberal Unionist gain from Liberal		Swing	+9.9	

=== Elections in the 1890s ===
Allen

General election 1892: Newcastle-under-Lyme
Party	Candidate	Votes	%	±%
Liberal	William Allen	4,024	57.8	+9.1
Liberal Unionist	Douglas Coghill	2,936	42.2	−9.1
Majority		1,088	15.6	N/A
Turnout		6,960	78.5	+6.4
Registered electors		8,862		
Liberal gain from Liberal Unionist		Swing	+9.1	

General election 1895: Newcastle-under-Lyme
Party	Candidate	Votes	%	±%
Liberal	William Allen	3,510	50.8	−7.0
Liberal Unionist	Arthur Morier Lee	3,399	49.2	+7.0
Majority		111	1.6	−14.0
Turnout		6,909	83.4	+4.9
Registered electors		8,281		
Liberal hold		Swing	−7.0	

=== Elections in the 1900s ===
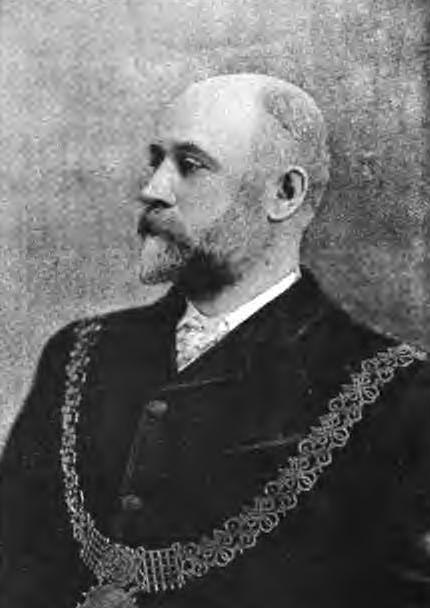
Haslam

General election 1900: Newcastle-under-Lyme
Party	Candidate	Votes	%	±%
Liberal Unionist	Alfred Seale Haslam	3,750	51.2	+2.0
Liberal	William Allen	3,568	48.8	−2.0
Majority		182	2.4	N/A
Turnout		7,318	80.5	−2.9
Registered electors		9,095		
Liberal Unionist gain from Liberal		Swing	+2.0	

General election 1906: Newcastle-under-Lyme
Party	Candidate	Votes	%	±%
Liberal	Josiah Wedgwood	5,155	63.6	+14.8
Liberal Unionist	Alfred Seale Haslam	2,948	36.4	−14.8
Majority		2,207	27.2	N/A
Turnout		8,103	84.0	+3.5
Registered electors		9,650		
Liberal gain from Liberal Unionist		Swing	+14.8	

=== Elections in the 1910s ===
Wedgwood

General election January 1910: Newcastle-under-Lyme
Party	Candidate	Votes	%	±%
Liberal	Josiah Wedgwood	5,613	56.9	−6.7
Liberal Unionist	Ewart Grogan	4,245	43.1	+6.7
Majority		1,368	13.8	−13.4
Turnout		9,858	93.8	+9.8
Liberal hold		Swing	-6.7	

General election December 1910: Newcastle-under-Lyme
Party	Candidate	Votes	%	±%
Liberal	Josiah Wedgwood	5,281	56.4	−0.5
Liberal Unionist	Ewart Grogan	4,087	43.6	+0.5
Majority		1,194	12.8	−1.0
Turnout		9,368	89.1	−4.7
Liberal hold		Swing	-0.5	

General Election 1914/15:

Another General Election was required to take place before the end of 1915. The political parties had been making preparations for an election to take place and by July 1914, the following candidates had been selected;

- Liberal: Josiah Wedgwood
- Unionist: Edgar Percy Hewitt

General election 1918: Newcastle-under-Lyme
Party	Candidate	Votes	%	±%
Independent Liberal	Josiah Wedgwood*	Unopposed		
Independent Liberal gain from Liberal				

* Wedgwood was issued with a Coalition Coupon but did not accept it. He was also adopted by the local Liberal association, but considered himself an independent candidate.

== Election results 1832-1868 ==
=== Elections in the 1830s ===
General election 1832: Newcastle-under-Lyme (2 seats)
Party	Candidate	Votes	%	±%
Tory	William Henry Miller	607	36.3	+7.1
Tory	Henry Willoughby	587	35.1	N/A
Tory	Edmund Peel	478	28.6	−18.5
Majority		109	6.5	+0.9
Turnout		941	96.7	c. +1.6
Registered electors		973		
Tory hold		Swing	N/A	
Tory hold		Swing	N/A	

General election 1835: Newcastle-under-Lyme (2 seats)
Party	Candidate	Votes	%	±%
Conservative	Edmund Peel	689	43.6	+15.0
Conservative	William Henry Miller	494	31.3	−5.0
Conservative	Henry Willoughby	397	25.1	−10.0
Majority		97	6.2	−0.3
Turnout		922	93.4	−3.3
Registered electors		987		
Conservative hold		Swing	N/A	
Conservative hold		Swing	N/A	

General election 1837: Newcastle-under-Lyme (2 seats)
Party	Candidate	Votes	%	±%
Conservative	William Henry Miller	669	41.9	+10.6
Conservative	Spencer Horsey de Horsey	635	39.8	N/A
Whig	Richard Badnall	292	18.3	New
Majority		343	21.5	+15.3
Turnout		881	88.9	−4.5
Registered electors		991		
Conservative hold		Swing	N/A	
Conservative hold		Swing	N/A	

=== Elections in the 1840s ===
General election 1841: Newcastle-under-Lyme (2 seats)
Party	Candidate	Votes	%	±%
Conservative	Edmund Buckley	721	42.3	+2.5
Whig	John Quincey Harris	565	33.2	+14.9
Conservative	William Henry Miller	417	24.5	−17.4
Turnout		977	94.1	+5.2
Registered electors		1,090		
Majority		156	9.1	−12.4
Conservative hold		Swing	−2.5	
Majority		148	8.7	N/A
Whig gain from Conservative		Swing	+14.9	

Harris' election was declared void on petition on 11 May 1842, due to bribery by his agent, causing a by-election.

By-election, 14 June 1842: Newcastle-under-Lyme
Party	Candidate	Votes	%	±%
Whig	John Quincey Harris	499	51.0	+17.8
Conservative	John Campbell Colquhoun	479	49.0	−17.8
Majority		20	2.0	−6.7
Turnout		978	91.0	−3.1
Registered electors		1,075		
Whig hold		Swing	+17.8	

Harris' election was again declared void on 23 July 1842, due to bribery by his agents, and Colquhoun was declared elected in his place.

General election 1847: Newcastle-under-Lyme (2 seats)
Party	Candidate	Votes	%	±%
Peelite	Samuel Christy	571	32.5	N/A
Whig	William Jackson	565	32.1	+15.5
Conservative	Francis Egerton	522	29.7	−37.1
Whig	William Greig	101	5.7	−10.9
Turnout		880 (est)	81.9 (est)	−12.2
Registered electors		1,074		
Majority		49	2.8	N/A
Peelite gain from Conservative		Swing	N/A	
Majority		43	2.4	−6.3
Whig hold		Swing	+17.0	

Christy resigned by accepting the office of Steward of the Chiltern Hundreds due to holding a government contract, causing a by-election in which he stood.

By-election, 15 December 1847: Newcastle-under-Lyme
Party	Candidate	Votes	%	±%
Peelite	Samuel Christy	546	59.8	+27.3
Whig	Thomas Ross	367	40.2	+3.6
Majority		179	19.6	+16.8
Turnout		913	85.0	+3.1
Registered electors		1,074		
Peelite hold		Swing	+11.9	

=== Elections in the 1850s ===
General election 1852: Newcastle-under-Lyme (2 seats)
Party	Candidate	Votes	%	±%
Whig	William Jackson	622	42.6	+10.5
Peelite	Samuel Christy	585	40.1	+7.6
Whig	Thomas Ross	252	17.3	+11.6
Turnout		730 (est)	66.9 (est)	−15.0
Registered electors		1,090		
Majority		37	2.5	+0.1
Whig hold		Swing	+3.4	
Majority		333	22.8	+20.0
Peelite hold		Swing	−14.9	

General election 1857: Newcastle-under-Lyme (2 seats)
Party	Candidate	Votes	%	±%
Peelite	Samuel Christy	654	55.4	+15.3
Whig	William Jackson	413	35.0	−7.6
Independent Liberal	John Riley	113	9.6	New
Majority		241	20.4	−2.4
Turnout		590 (est)	59.2 (est)	−7.7
Registered electors		997		
Peelite hold		Swing	+11.5	
Whig hold		Swing	−11.5	

General election 1859: Newcastle-under-Lyme (2 seats)
Party	Candidate	Votes	%	±%
Conservative	William Murray	Unopposed		
Liberal	William Jackson	Unopposed		
Registered electors		994		
Conservative gain from Peelite				
Liberal hold				

=== Elections in the 1860s ===
General election 1865: Newcastle-under-Lyme (2 seats)
Party	Candidate	Votes	%	±%
Liberal	William Shepherd Allen	520	44.1	N/A
Conservative	Edmund Buckley	494	41.9	N/A
Liberal	John Ashford Wise	166	14.1	N/A
Turnout		1,014 (est)	94.2 (est)	N/A
Registered electors		1,077		
Majority		26	2.2	N/A
Liberal hold		Swing	N/A	
Majority		328	27.8	N/A
Conservative hold		Swing	N/A	

== Pre-1832 election results ==
=== Elections in the 1830s ===
General election 1830: Newcastle-under-Lyme (2 seats)
Party	Candidate	Votes	%
Tory	Richardson Borradaile	453	30.4
Whig	William Henry Miller	436	29.3
Tory	Edmund Peel	319	21.4
Whig	Evelyn Denison	280	18.8
Turnout		773	c. 90.9
Registered electors		c. 850	
Majority		17	1.1
Tory hold			
Majority		117	7.9
Whig hold			

General election 1831: Newcastle-under-Lyme (2 seats)
Party	Candidate	Votes	%	±%
Tory	Edmund Peel	746	47.1	+25.7
Tory	William Henry Miller	463	29.2	−1.2
Whig	Josiah Wedgwood	374	23.6	−24.5
Majority		89	5.6	+4.5
Turnout		808	c. 95.1	c. +4.2
Registered electors		c. 850		
Tory hold		Swing	+19.0	
Tory gain from Whig		Swing	+5.5	

== See also ==
- 1986 Newcastle-under-Lyme by-election
- List of parliamentary constituencies in Staffordshire
- List of parliamentary constituencies in West Midlands (region)

== Sources ==
- The History of Parliament: the House of Commons - Newcastle-under-Lyme, Borough, 1386 to 1831
- Britain Votes/Europe Votes By-Election Supplement 1983-, compiled and edited by F.W.S. Craig (Parliamentary Research Services 1985-)
