= Charles Donaldson-Hudson =

English politician (1840–1893)

Charles Donaldson-Hudson (12 February 1840 – 18 April 1893) was an English Conservative politician who sat in the House of Commons from 1880 to 1885.

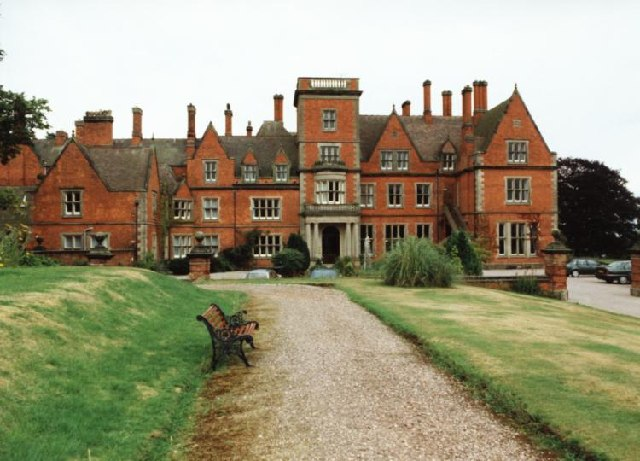
Cheswardine Hall built 1875

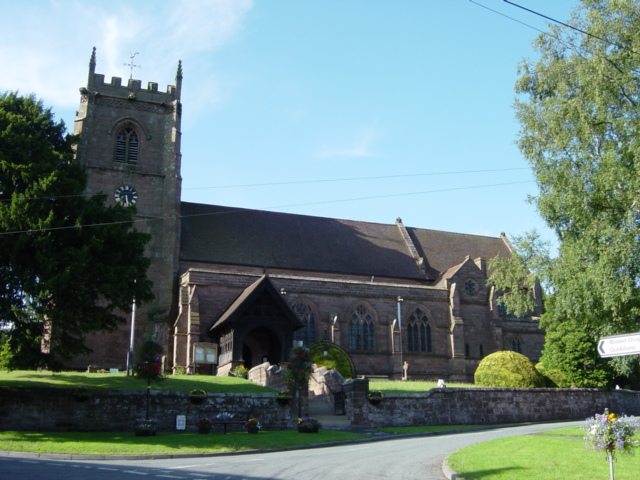
St Swithun, Cheswardine - rebuilt 1886–1889

Donaldson-Hudson was born as Donaldson, the son of John Donaldson of Wigton Cumberland, and his wife Catherine Halliley, daughter of Anthony Halliley. He was educated at Merton College, Oxford and after the death of his uncle Thomas Hudson in 1852 assumed the additional surname Hudson by Royal Licence in 1862, as his uncle had no issue. In 1870 at the age of 30 he inherited his uncle's estates at Cheswardine according to the terms of his uncle's will. He was a J.P. for Shropshire and Staffordshire and in 1876 was elected a member of the London School Board. The current Cheswardine Hall, designed by John Macvicar Anderson, was rebuilt in 1875 on the site of the former 'The Hill' that had been purchased by his uncle Thomas Hudson . The rebuilding of the church of St Swithun, in Cheswardine between 1886 and 1889 was funded principally due to the generosity of Charles Donaldson-Hudson and his family, in spite of the injuries received in his hunting accident and his wife brought the project to fruition. The design of the new church was by John Loughborough Pearson, RA, of London.

In August 1878 Donaldson-Hudson stood unsuccessfully for Parliament at a by-election for Newcastle-under-Lyme. He was appointed High Sheriff of Shropshire in 1880. At the 1880 general election he was elected as one of the two Members of Parliament (MPs) for Newcastle-under-Lyme. He held the seat until 1885, when the borough was reduced to one seat under Redistribution of Seats Act and he did not stand again. He suffered a serious injury to his head whilst out hunting in North Shropshire, and this effectively brought his Parliamentary career to an end.

Donaldson-Hudson died at the age of 53 in 1893.

Donaldson-Hudson married Sara Marie Streatfeild, daughter of Major Sidney Streatfeild in 1870.

Parliament of the United Kingdom
Preceded by Samuel Rathbone Edge; William Shepherd Allen	Member of Parliament for Newcastle-under-Lyme; 1880 – 1885; With: William Shepherd Allen	Succeeded by William Shepherd Allen
