= Aaron Bell (politician) =

British Conservative politician

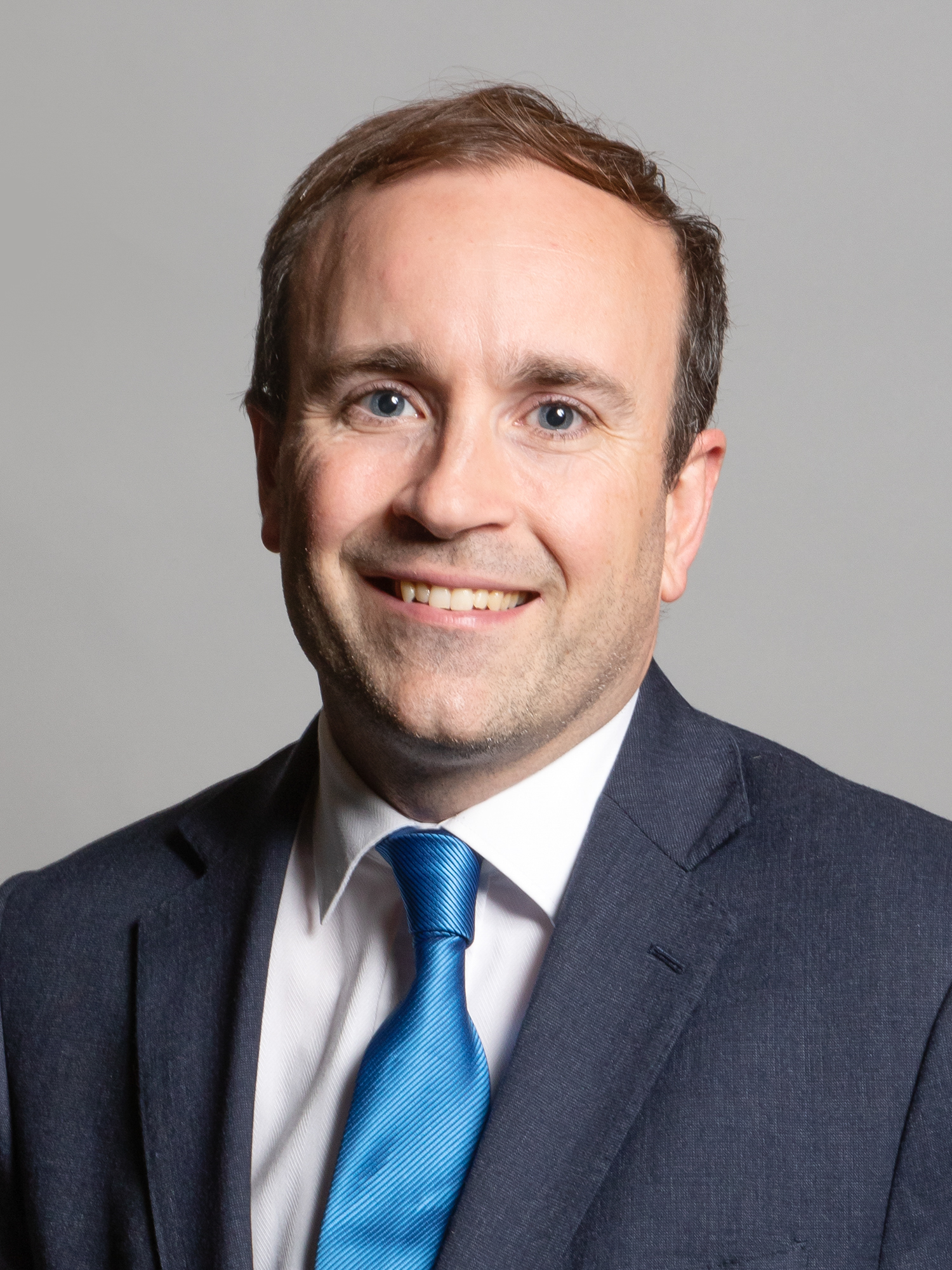

Assistant Government Whip
- In office 14 November 2023 – 30 May 2024
- Prime Minister: Rishi Sunak

Member of Parliament for Newcastle-under-Lyme
- In office 12 December 2019 – 30 May 2024
- Preceded by: Paul Farrelly
- Succeeded by: Adam Jogee

Personal details
- Born: Aaron Stuart Bell; 25 February 1980 (age 46) Dulwich, Greater London, England
- Party: Conservative
- Education: St. John's College, Oxford (BA)

Aaron Stuart Bell (born 25 February 1980) is a British Conservative Party politician who served as the Member of Parliament (MP) for Newcastle-under-Lyme from 2019 to 2024.

== Early life ==
Bell was born in Dulwich, south east London, to parents Stuart and Janet Bell. He was educated at St Olave's Grammar School (a voluntary aided grammar school) in Greater London, and then privately educated at Episcopal High School in Alexandria, Virginia, USA. He then studied PPE at St John's College, Oxford. Bell graduated with a BA in 2001.

Before his political career, Bell was a successful quizzer: he was part of the St John's College, Oxford team that were runners up in the 2000–01 series of University Challenge. In 2001, he took part in The Weakest Link, being the final person voted off in the episode but beating future Eggheads panellist CJ de Mooi. He won the Krypton Factor in 2009; he was part of the Epicureans team that won Only Connect in 2010; he also won £25,000 on Deal or No Deal in 2006.

Bell worked as a trading development manager from 2003 to 2006, being employed by Ladbrokes. He was a senior trading performance analyst from 2006 to 2019 for the online betting company Bet365, and co-founded DivideBuy, a financial technology firm which employs 40 staff in Newcastle.

== Political career ==
Bell stood in the Labour-held seat of Don Valley in South Yorkshire at the 2017 election, but was unsuccessful. Bell was elected as MP for Newcastle-under-Lyme at the 2019 general election being the first Conservative MP for the constituency in modern times.

As of 21 January 2020, Bell was an unpaid member of the board of Town Deal Newcastle-under-Lyme.

Bell benefitted from hospitality worth thousands of pounds, provided on behalf of the gambling industry. He was a member of the All Party Parliamentary Group on Gambling, spoke out against tougher regulation of gambling and criticised measures taken by the gambling industry regulator to reduce addiction.

In November 2021, he was one of 13 Conservative MPs who voted against a government-supported amendment to defer the suspension of Conservative MP Owen Paterson who was found to have breached lobbying rules.

Bell was elected Vice Chair of the All-Party Parliamentary Humanist Group in 2021. He became the secretary in 2022.

In January 2022, in the wake of the Partygate controversy, Bell publicly criticised Boris Johnson by asking: "Does the Prime Minister think I'm a fool" for properly following COVID-19 regulations during his grandmother's funeral the year before.

== Sexual misconduct ==
On 31 May 2024, Bell announced he would stand down at the 2024 United Kingdom general election due to personal and family reasons. In October 2024, and following a complaint in February 2024, parliament's Independent Expert Panel reprimanded him for "brazen and drunken" sexual misconduct in parliament’s Strangers' Bar in December 2023 by touching a young female member of staff's thigh, waist and bottom without her consent. Bell apologised for his behavior and acknowledged that his decision to stand down was motivated in part by the investigation.

== Personal life ==
Bell lives in Newcastle-under-Lyme with his wife Emily, whom he married in 2008. They have three children.

Bell appeared on the fourth series of BBC Four quiz show Only Connect as a member of the Epicureans, scoring the highest score of 41.

Parliament of the United Kingdom
Preceded by Paul Farrelly	Member of Parliament for Newcastle-under-Lyme; 2019–2024	Succeeded by Adam Jogee
