= Ralf de la Hogh =

English politician

Ralf de la Hogh (fl. 1384–1395) of Newcastle-under-Lyme, Staffordshire, was an English politician.

He was a member (MP) of the parliament of England for Newcastle-under-Lyme in April 1384, 1385, 1386, 1391, 1393 and 1395.
