= Thomas Humphrey (MP) =

English politician

Sir Thomas Humphrey (c. 1554 – 4 February 1624) was an English politician.

He was a younger son of William Humphrey of Barton Segrave and Swepstone, Leicestershire and educated at Peterhouse, Cambridge.

He was a member (MP) of the parliament of England for Newcastle-under-Lyme in 1589. He was a justice of the peace for Leicestershire from c. 1601 and appointed High Sheriff of Leicestershire for 1602–1603. He was knighted on 23 July 1603.

He married twice: firstly Mary, the daughter of William Mering of Mering, Northamptonshire and secondly Suzanna, the daughter of George Pilkington of Barston, with whom he had 3 sons and 3 daughters.
