= John Lawton (1656–1736) =

English Member of Parliament

John Lawton (1656–1736) was an English Member of Parliament.

He was the eldest son of William Lawton of Lawton, Cheshire.

He was Mayor of Newcastle-under-Lyme for 1692–93 and was a deputy Lieutenant for Cheshire and Staffordshire by 1701, probably until his death. He was elected Member of Parliament for Newcastle-under-Lyme in 1689, 1695, 1706, and 1709.

He married twice, firstly Anne, the daughter of George Montagu of Horton, Northamptonshire, with whom he had 7 sons (6 of whom predeceased him) and 8 daughters and secondly his cousin Mary, the daughter of Edward Longueville of Iver, Buckinghamshire and widow of Sir Edward Longueville, 3rd Baronet of Wolverton, with whom he had another son.
