= Samuel Terrick =

Samuel Terrick (c. 1602 – 1675) was an English politician who sat in the House of Commons at various times between 1645 and 1660.

Terrick was the second son of John Terrick of Clayton Griffin and his wife Jane Leigh, daughter of John Leigh of Malpas, Cheshire. He was apprenticed to a draper in London in 1618 and was a liveryman of the Worshipful Company of Drapers from 1635 to 1639. He was a lukewarm supporter of Parliament during the Civil War and was commissioner for sequestration for Staffordshire in 1643 and commissioner for assessment for Staffordshire in 1645.

In 1645, Terrick was elected Member of Parliament for Newcastle-under-Lyme in the Long Parliament. He was J.P. for Staffordshire from 1647 to 1649 and commissioner for militia in 1648. He was secluded under Pride's Purge in December 1648. During the Interregnum he prospered for a time in the French trade and was liveryman of the Drapers Company from 1648 to 1651, junior warden from 1651 to 1652 and assistant from 1652 to 1658. He was commissioner for assessment for Staffordshire in 1657. In 1658 he went bankrupt for £20,000.

Terrick was commissioner for assessment for Staffordshire from January 1660 to 1663. In April 1660, he was elected MP for Newcastle-under-Lyme in the Convention Parliament. He was commissioner for assessment for Newcastle from August 1660 to 1661. He was deputy receiver of hearth-tax for Denbighshire, Flintshire and Anglesey from 1667 to 1667.

Terrick died in 1675 and was buried "inexpensively" in the cloisters of St. Nicholas Cole Abbey on 14 October 1675.

Terrick married Eleanor Layton, daughter of John Layton of London in about 1628. They had three sons and two daughters. His great-grandson Richard became bishop of London in 1764, but no other member of the family sat in the House of Commons.

Parliament of England
Preceded by Sir Richard Leveson; Sir John Merrick	Member of Parliament for Newcastle-under-Lyme; 1645–1648; With: Sir John Merrick	Succeeded by
