= Georg Wechter =

German painter and engraver

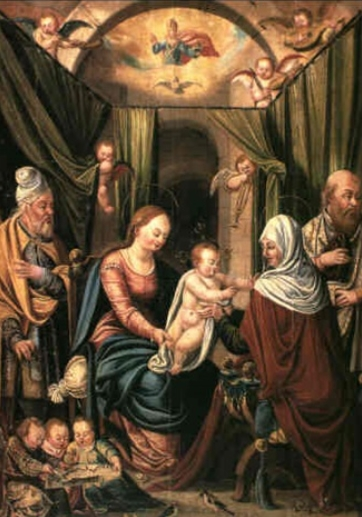
Madonna and Child with St Elisabeth, Georg Wechter, oil on panel, n.d.

Georg Wechter (1526 – 28 March 1586) was a German painter and engraver best known for his gold and silver designs.

In 1579 he produced his influential pattern book 30 Stück zum verzachnen für die Goldschmied verfertigt Geörg Wechter 15 Maller 79 Nürnberg (Nuremberg, 1579; e.g. Berlin, Kupferstichkab.), which provided 30 designs that any competent goldsmith could copy who could not produce his own.
