= John Offley Crewe =

English politician (1681-1749)

Offley's Name Act 1708
- Act of Parliament
- Parliament of Great Britain
- Long title: An Act to enable Anne Crewe (late Offley) Widow, and John Crewe (late Offley) her Son and Heir Apparent, to change their Surnames from Offley to Crewe, according to the Settlement of John Crewe Esquire, deceased.
- Citation: 7 Ann. c. 3 Pr. (Note: This is the citation in The Statutes of the Realm.); 7 Ann. c. 7 Pr.) (Note: This is the citation in The Statutes at Large.)
- Territorial extent: Great Britain

Dates
- Royal assent: 23 March 1709
- Commencement: 16 November 1708 (Note: Start of session.)

Status: Current legislation

John Offley Crewe (also known as John Offley-Crewe, 20 September 1681 - 25 August 1749) was an English politician who was MP for Cheshire and other constituencies, the eldest son of John Offley of Madeley. He married Sarah Price, daughter of Morgan Price of Nantgwared, Breconshire, in 1707. The couple had four sons and three daughters. Offley inherited the family estate at Madeley in 1688 upon the death of his father, and in 1711, he also inherited Crewe Hall and other estates from his great-uncle, Sir John Crewe of Utkinton. In 1709, by a private act of Parliament, Offley's Name Act 1708 (7 Ann. c. 3 Pr.), he assumed the surname Crewe to honour the Crewe inheritance.

The Offley family was an established name in Staffordshire, originating with Sir Thomas Offley, a Merchant Taylor who purchased the manor of Madeley in the mid-16th century. John Crewe Offley's father was a noted Whig, serving as Sheriff of Staffordshire in 1679-80 and being involved in a legal incident in 1685 with Sir Robert Cotton, 1st Baronet.

John Crewe Offley followed in his father's political footsteps. In 1703, he was appointed as a deputy-lieutenant, marking the start of his significant involvement in county affairs.

== Political career ==
Offley's early attempts to secure a parliamentary seat were challenging. In November 1703, he was elected in a by-election for Newcastle-under-Lyme, but the result was declared void in February 1704 due to bribery allegations. He managed to win a subsequent by-election in November 1704. Despite these difficulties, his loyalty to the Whig party was apparent; he opposed the Tack legislation in November 1704 and was blacklisted for supporting the Lords' amendments to a bill concerning the abjuration oath in 1703.

In 1705, Offley shifted focus from Newcastle-under-Lyme to Cheshire, winning a county seat alongside another Whig, Langham Booth. His election methods were criticized, with allegations of creating freehold votes and utilizing mobs for support. However, the Earl of Sunderland recognized Offley's victory as a Whig gain, which was reflected in his voting patterns in Parliament.

In 1708, he retained his Cheshire seat and continued to be a reliable Whig supporter, particularly in matters of trade and navigation. This period saw his name formally changed to Crewe, allowing him to inherit the family's estates.

During the 1709-10 sessions, Offley became involved in debates over the Weaver navigation bill, aligning against it due to potential impacts on the family's salt interests in Nantwich. Although he was not a prominent figure in this controversy, his written correspondence indicated strong loyalty to Cheshire's economic interests.

== Later career and legacy ==
The 1710 elections marked a shift in power, with Offley losing his seat amid a Tory resurgence. He did not contest in 1713, but made an unsuccessful attempt to reclaim the seat in 1715. Eventually, he returned to Parliament in 1722, representing Cheshire again, this time in alliance with the Tory Charles Cholmondeley.

Offley continued to serve in minor court positions from 1714 until his death. Upon his death in 1749, his estates were valued at a substantial £15,000 per annum. Most of his properties were inherited by his eldest son, John, while his London and Surrey properties were bequeathed to his wife and younger sons.

== Death and succession ==
John Crewe Offley died on 25 August 1749, leaving behind a significant estate and a legacy tied to both the Offley and Crewe family names. His wealth and properties ensured that his family maintained an influential presence in Cheshire and Staffordshire.
