= Sir John Skeffington, 2nd Baronet =

Sir John Skeffington, 2nd Baronet (c. 1590 – 19 November 1651) was an English landowner and politician, elected to the House of Commons in 1626. He was fined a high sum for supporting the Royalist cause in the English Civil War.

== Public life ==
Skeffington was the eldest son of Sir William Skeffington, 1st Baronet of Fisherwicke, Staffordshire, and his wife, Margaret Dering of Surrenden, near Lenham, Kent. He matriculated from Jesus College, Cambridge, in the spring of 1603 and was admitted to the Middle Temple on 30 October 1604. He was knighted in August 1624. In 1626, he was elected Member of Parliament for Newcastle-under-Lyme. He succeeded to the baronetcy on the death of his father in 1635.

From 1637 to 1638 Skeffington was Sheriff of Staffordshire. He supported the Royalist cause in the English Civil War and was fined £1,152 in November 1650, which was reduced later to £961.

Skeffington was succeeded in the baronetcy briefly by his son William (died 7 April 1652), then by a cousin, John Skeffington, the 4th baronet, who was the son of Sir Richard Skeffington, knight.

== Marriage and death ==
Skeffington married Cicely Skeffington of Skeffington, Leicestershire. They had at least one child. He died at the age of about 60 and was buried at Skeffington on 20 November 1651.

Parliament of England
Preceded by Edward Mainwaring; John Keeling	Member of Parliament for Newcastle-under-Lyme; 1626; With: John Keeling	Succeeded by Sir George Gresley; Sir Rowland Cotton
Baronetage of England
Preceded by William Skeffington	Baronet (of Fisherwick); 1635–1651	Succeeded by William Skeffington
