= John Biddulph (MP) =

English politician

John Biddulph of Newcastle-under-Lyme, Staffordshire (fl. 1402–1433) was an English politician. He sat as Member of Parliament for Newcastle-under-Lyme in 1419 and May 1421.

He also served as bailiff of Newcastle-under-Lyme from Michaelmas 1408 till 1409; mayor of Newcastle-under-Lyme from 1418 till 1419; probably escheator in Staffordshire from 9 December 1408 till 7 November 1409; and commissioner of inquiry in Staffordshire in February 1422 concerning counterfeiting.

He was the son of Roger Biddulph of Newcastle-under-Lyme. By Michaelmas 1403, he married Margery, the widow of Richard Buntable (died c. 1400) of Newcastle-under-Lyme.
