= Hugh de Stanford =

English politician

Hugh de Stanford (fl. 1399–1422) was an English politician.

== Life ==
Stanford's wife was named Joyce. They lived at Hextells, and he may have been related to Richard Stanford, MP for nearby Stafford.

== Career ==
He is recorded as a lawyer in 1398, and then worked for the Stafford family. Stanford was Member of Parliament for Bridgnorth in 1411 and May 1413. He was MP for Newcastle-under-Lyme in 1420, December 1421, 1422 and 1423.
