= Fred Hando =

Welsh writer, artist, teacher, and historian

Fred Hando MBE
- Born: Frederick James Hando; 23 March 1888; Maindee, Newport, Monmouthshire, (Note: Monmouthshire's Welsh status was ambiguous at this time.) UK
- Died: 17 February 1970 (aged 81); St. Joseph's Nursing Home, Newport, Monmouthshire, UK
- Occupations: Headteacher; writer; artist
- Known for: Publications on history of Monmouthshire
- Children: Margaret Delacourt-Smith; John Hando; Robert Hando

Frederick James Hando MBE (23 March 1888 – 17 February 1970) was a Welsh writer, artist and schoolteacher from Newport. He chronicled the history, character and folklore of Monmouthshire, which he also called Gwent, in a series of nearly 800 newspaper articles and several books published between the 1920s and 1960s.

== Biography ==
Hando was born in Maindee, Newport, Monmouthshire, the son of a postmaster Alfred and his wife Miriam, and attended school there. (Note: The Hando family came from North Curry in Somerset. In the 18th century part of the family emigrated to Australia. The parents died en route, however, and their two five-year-old sons arrived in Australia as orphans. There are hundreds of their descendants in Australia today.) He had two younger brothers, Frank and Harry. He trained at Borough Road College, London, before returning to Newport as a teacher. He served as a gunnery officer with the Royal Engineers in the First World War, where his experiences in Flanders had a profound effect on him. In his anthology of authors from the county, Monmouthshire Writers: A literary history, W. J. Townsend Collins suggests that Hando's experiences at the Battle of Vimy Ridge occasioned "something like a religious conversion - 'his eyes were opened so that he could see'".

Hando married Alice Stanton, the daughter of a Newport builder, and the couple had two children – Margaret and John. Alice died while still young. After a number of years, Hando married again to Daisy, a staff member at his school. The couple soon had a son, Robert.

Fred Hando unlocked our prison and set free what talents that I am sure would have remained locked in us for ever. Fred was a most talented man. He proved to us that all things were possible... We all of us come to a crossroads in our lives. I can only hope that at every crossroads there will be a smiling Fred Hando pointing the way and saying "This is the most pleasant and interesting way".

–Johnny Morris on Hando's teaching style

In 1925 he was appointed as the first headmaster of Hatherleigh School in Newport, where one of his pupils was Johnny Morris, later a noted radio and television presenter [see box]. Hando adopted an open and progressive teaching style and was described by Miriam Andrews, a former teacher at the school, as "a wonderful headmaster and he made the children very proud of Hatherleigh".

His interest in local history was given an impetus when he was asked to provide sketches to illustrate Sir Joseph Bradney's multi-volume A History of Monmouthshire from the Coming of the Normans into Wales down to the Present Time and his first articles about Monmouthshire were published in the South Wales Argus in 1922. The then editor, William Collins agreed to an initial run of 15 articles. In total, he contributed 795 articles to the newspaper between 1922 and 13 February 1970, a few days before his death. Due to their high readership, the page of the Argus on which his articles appeared became particularly prized as advertising space. Many of his articles and drawings were republished in anthologies of his work. In his early writings, Hando was particularly interested in ley lines and the alignment of the sun with stone circles. He said that he wanted to add to what was already on the map and that by studying leys he could reach back in history far beyond Roman Britain.

Hando was organist and choirmaster of Summerhill Baptist Church Newport for many years". In 1953 he was awarded the MBE for services to education and to Monmouthshire".

Hando died on 17 February 1970, at St. Joseph's Nursing Home in Newport, at the age of 81. His last article, on District and Street Names, appeared in the South Wales Argus four days before his death.

== Works ==
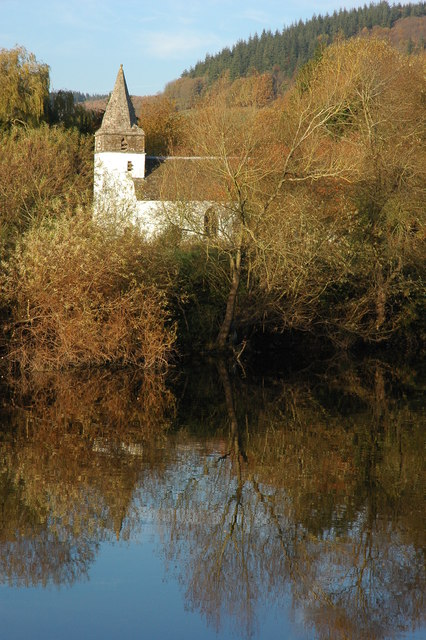
"The lovely white church of Dixton" – Hando wrote of the church in his 1958 collection, Out and About in Monmouthshire and one of the ‘Hando seats’ in his memory was erected in the churchyard after his death.

Hando's aim in writing his articles was set out in the preface to his The Pleasant Land of Gwent, published in 1944; "to persuade readers to see the little places of a shy county". Monmouthshire's set pieces, such as Raglan Castle and Tintern Abbey were not his focus, he wrote of lesser known sites such as the "Virtuous Well" at Trellech, "the tallest house in Monmouthshire" at Treowen, and the medieval boundary marker at Croes Llwyd. His scope was broader than buildings; in his foreword to the 1964 volume, Here and There in Monmouthshire, Edwin Morris, the then Archbishop of Wales, describes Hando's canvas as "reminiscence, folklore, local history, place names and introductions to interesting people, past and present, illustrated by his own beautiful drawings". He took a relatively early interest in conservation. In his article on Allt-y-Bela, published in Journeys in Gwent in 1951, he wrote of the house's perilous state of dilapidation, noting "unless immediate and drastic action is taken, we shall lose priceless relics". Fifty years later, in the Gwent/Monmouthshire Pevsner, the architectural historian John Newman described Allt-y-Bela as "miserably derelict". (Note: The house was restored by the Spitalfields Historic Buildings Trust between 2001-2006.) His concern for preservation extended beyond individual buildings to the wider Monmouthshire landscape. An article published in Monmouthshire Sketch Book in 1954, was entitled "The Threat to Machen Vale" and condemned plans by the Central Electricity Generating Board to construct an electricity generating station in the Vale.

The vanishing folklore and customs of Monmouthshire were of particular interest to Hando. (Note: Christine Anne Watkins, the author of Gwent Folk Tales, records her debt to Hando in the Acknowledgements to the book; "To the work of Fred Hando, whose wonderful books and sketches (are) always inspiring".) More than one article covered the Mari Lwyd, a horse's skull covered by a sheet and borne aloft on a pole, which formed part of Christmas celebrations in the county. In a number of articles, including one on The Skirrid in Monmouthshire Sketch Book, he wrote of the legends of Jack o' Kent, who was said to have caused the cleft in the Skirrid's summit by jumping to it from the Sugar Loaf, some four miles distant.

Monmouthshire's pubs were another topic of abiding interest. Hando wrote of, and drank and smoked in, a large number of the country's hostelries, the Robin Hood Inn, Monmouth being a particular favourite. In his Monmouth Town Sketch Book, he recalls a visit in 1947, when he encountered "the last of the Monmouth 'cards'". (Note: A 'card' was a "'character', an 'original'; a 'clever, audacious, person'".)

Hando's Pictorial Guide to the Wye Valley and the Forest of Dean is the only one of his books which took the form of a conventional travel guide, as opposed to a collection of articles.

== Legacy ==
After his death the Monmouthshire Local History Council set up several "Hando seats" at viewpoints in the county that he had considered to be particularly fine. Funded by public subscription, the seats were located in Dixton churchyard; at Llandegfedd Reservoir; on Lawrence Hill, Newport; at the top of the Wyndcliff, St. Arvans; and near Keeper's Pond on the Blorenge near Blaenavon. Nearly 50 years after his death, Hando and his work are still cited in 21st century controversies. His detailed chronicling of the county's history was referenced in the debate on the construction of an extension of the M4 motorway across the Gwent Levels; and the late Paul Flynn, former member of parliament for Newport West, recalled the "halcyon days" of Hando's columns in a discussion about declining journalistic standards at the South Wales Argus.

From November 2017, the South Wales Argus re-published his weekly "Rambles in Gwent" column, giving readers an opportunity to read Hando's descriptions of what the Argus editor Kenneth Loveland called "the shy beauty of this delectable county".

== Family ==
His daughter, Margaret, was born in April 1916. She graduated from St Anne's College, Oxford, and later married Charles Smith, later Delacourt-Smith, in 1939. Her husband became a Labour MP in 1945 and later a Government minister, and was ennobled in 1967. She was a councillor and Justice of the Peace in Windsor in the 1960s. After her husband's death, she was herself raised to the peerage in 1974 as Baroness Delacourt-Smith of Alteryn. She remarried in 1978 and died in 2010 at the age of 94. Margaret's brother, from Hando's first marriage, to Alice, was John. Hando also had a son, Robert, from his second marriage.

== Bibliography ==
=== Books by Fred Hando ===
(all published by R. H. Johns, Newport)

- Rambles in Gwent (1924)
- The Pleasant Land of Gwent (1944) With an introduction by Arthur Machen. (including limited Deluxe Edition of 220 copies, signed by the author)
- Journeys in Gwent (1951) (including limited Deluxe Edition of 350 copies, signed by the author), OCLC 754992827
- Pictorial Guide to the Wye Valley and the Royal Forest of Dean (1952), (Edited by W. A. Stoker)
- Monmouthshire Sketch Book (1954)
- Out and About in Monmouthshire (1958)
- Monmouth Town (1964)
- Here and There in Monmouthshire (1964)

=== Collections and appreciations ===
Collections of Hando's articles, edited by Chris Barber:

- Hando's Gwent (1987), Blorenge Books ISBN 978-0951044452
- Hando's Gwent Volume 2 (1989), Blorenge Books ISBN 978-0951044490

An appreciation of Hando's work, Fred J Hando, A Proud Son of Gwent (ISBN 9781904192626), including some of his writings and drawings, was published by his relative David Hando in 2014.

== Sources ==
- Collins, William James Townsend (1945). Monmouthshire Writers: A Literary History and Anthology. Newport: R. H. Johns Ltd. OCLC 236089162.
- Hando, Fred (1922). Rambles in Gwent. Newport: R. H. Johns Ltd. OCLC 771405583.
- — (1944). The Pleasant Land of Gwent. Newport: R. H. Johns Ltd. OCLC 2534151.
- — (1951). Journeys in Gwent. Newport: R. H. Johns Ltd. OCLC 30202753.
- — (1952). Pictorial Guide to the Wye Valley and the Forest of Dean. Newport: Ernest Joyce and Co. OCLC 30164265.
- — (1954). Monmouthshire Sketch Book. Newport: R. H. Johns Ltd. OCLC 30166792.
- — (1958). Out and About in Monmouthshire. Newport: R. H. Johns Ltd. OCLC 30235598.
- — (1961). "Monmouthshire Sketchbook: No.452". South Wales Argus.
- — (1964a). Monmouth Town Sketch Book. Newport: R. H. Johns Ltd. OCLC 30295655.
- — (1964b). Here and There in Monmouthshire. Newport: R. H. Johns Ltd. OCLC 30295639.
- — (1987). Chris Barber (ed.). Hando's Gwent. Vol. 1. Abergavenny, Wales: Blorenge Books. ISBN 9780951044452. OCLC 18745431.
- — (1989). Chris Barber (ed.). Hando's Gwent. Vol. 2. Abergavenny, Wales: Blorenge Books. ISBN 9780951044483. OCLC 650492501.
- Newman, John (2000). Gwent/Monmouthshire. Pevsner Architectural Guides. New Haven: Yale University Press. ISBN 978-0-300-09630-9.
- Stout, Alan (2009). Creating Prehistory: Druids, Ley Hunters and Archaeologists in pre-war Britain. New York: John Wiley & Son. ISBN 9781444302929. OCLC 437133104.
- Watkins, Christine Anne (2019). Gwent Folk Tales. Stroud, Gloucestershire: The History Press. ISBN 9780750991544.
