= 2022 Colchester Borough Council election =

2022 UK local government election

- 5 May 2022

18 out of 51 seats to Colchester Borough Council 26 seats needed for a majority
- Registered: 137,939 (▼1.7%)
- Turnout: 32.1% (▼2.0%)
	First party	Second party	Third party
Leader	Paul Dundas	Martin Goss	Adam Fox
Party	Conservative	Liberal Democrats	Labour
Leader's seat	Stanway (defeated)	Mile End	Old Heath & The Hythe
Last election	23 seats, 44.8%	12 seats, 19.7%	11 seats, 22.5%
Seats before	23	11	11
Seats won	6	5	6
Seats after	19	14	13
Seat change	▼4	▲2	▲2
Popular vote	16,308	13,731	13,311
Percentage	34.5%	29.1%	28.2%
Swing	▼10.3%	▲9.4%	▲5.7%
	Fourth party	Fifth party
Leader	Steph Nissen	Beverley Oxford
Party	Green	Independent
Leader's seat	Castle	Highwoods
Last election	2 seats, 10.7%	3 seats, 1.7%
Seats before	2	3
Seats won	1	0
Seats after	3	2
Seat change	▲1	▼1
Popular vote	3,909	Did not stand
Percentage	8.3%	Did not stand
Swing	▼2.4%	▼1.7%
- Winner of each seat at the 2022 Colchester Borough Council election.
Leader of the Council before election
Paul Dundas
Conservative
No overall control (Note: Conservative–Independent coalition.)
Leader of the Council after election
David King
Liberal Democrats
No overall control (Note: Liberal Democrats–Labour–Green coalition.)

The 2022 Colchester Borough Council election took place on 5 May 2022. Eighteen members of the council (one-third of the whole) were elected: one from 16 of the 17 wards, and two councillors from New Town & Christ Church ward, following the death of incumbent councillor Nick Cope (Liberal Democrats), elected in 2019 and due to serve until 2023.

At the election, the Conservative–Independent coalition lost control of the council, with the Conservatives losing seats to the Liberal Democrats and the Green Party. Paul Dundas, the leader of the council, lost his seat in Stanway to challenger Tracy Arnold.

Visual representation of the Council

Labour gained one seat from the Liberal Democrats and won the vacated Independent seat in Highwoods, giving them their largest share of representation on the council since the 1990s.

== Background ==
Following the results of the previous election, the ruling "Progressive Alliance" coalition (comprising the Liberal Democrats, Labour and Independents) lost control of the council after the Independents decided to form an administration with the Conservatives, giving them a majority of one seat over the opposition parties.

== Summary ==
=== Election results ===
2022 Colchester Borough Council election
Party	This election				Full council			This election		
Party	Candidates	Seats	Net	Seats %	Other	Total	Total %	Votes	Votes %	+/−
Conservative	18	6	▼4	33.3	13	19	37.3	16,308	34.5	–10.3
Liberal Democrats	18	5	▲2	27.8	9	14	27.5	13,731	29.1	+9.4
Labour	18	6	▲2	33.3	7	13	25.5	13,311	28.2	+5.7
Green	12	1	▲1	5.6	2	3	5.9	3,909	8.3	–2.4
Independent	0	0	▼1	0.0	2	2	3.9	N/A (Note: Did not stand candidates.)	N/A	–1.7

=== Incumbents ===
Ward	Incumbent councillor	Party	Re-standing
Berechurch	Martyn Warnes	Labour Co-op	Yes
Castle	Simon Crow	Conservative	Yes
Greenstead	Tina Bourne	Labour	No
Highwoods	Phil Oxford	Independent	No
Lexden & Braiswick	Martin Leatherdale	Conservative	Yes
Marks Tey & Layer	Jackie Maclean	Conservative	Yes
Mersea & Pyefleet	Robert Davidson	Conservative	Yes
Mile End	David King	Liberal Democrats	Yes
New Town & Christ Church	Lorcan Whitehead	Labour	No
Old Heath & The Hythe	Lee Scordis	Labour	Yes
Prettygate	Roger Buston	Conservative	Yes
Rural North	Peter Chillingworth	Conservative	No
Shrub End	Pauline Hazell	Conservative	No
St. Anne's & St. John's	Chris Hayter	Conservative	No
Stanway	Paul Dundas	Conservative	Yes
Tiptree	Derek Loveland	Conservative	No
Wivenhoe	Andrea Luxford-Vaughn	Liberal Democrats	Yes

== Aftermath ==
On 17 May 2022, it was announced that a three-party administration between the Liberal Democrats, Labour and the Green Party would be formed to run the council throughout the 2022–2023 term. This gave the new administration a majority of 12 seats over the now-opposition Conservatives.

David King (Liberal Democrats, Mile End) was elected Leader of the council, with Adam Fox (Labour Co-op, Old Heath & The Hythe) elected as the Deputy Leader.

=== Cabinet composition ===
Following coalition negotiations, a cabinet was formed that consisted of four Liberal Democrats, three Labour, and one Green Party member.

Portfolio	Councillor	Party
Strategy	David King	Liberal Democrats
Local Economy & Transformation	Adam Fox	Labour Co-op
Culture & Heritage	Pam Cox	Labour
Neighbourhood Services & Waste	Martin Goss	Liberal Democrats
Environment & Sustainability	Steph Nissen	Green
Resources	Mark Cory	Liberal Democrats
Planning & Infrastructure	Andrea Luxford-Vaughn	Liberal Democrats
Housing & Communities	Julie Young	Labour Co-op

== Ward results ==
The Statement of Persons Nominated was released on 5 April 2022, listing the candidates standing in each ward. The results of the borough council election were announced on 6 May 2022.

Incumbents are listed with an asterisk *

=== Berechurch ===
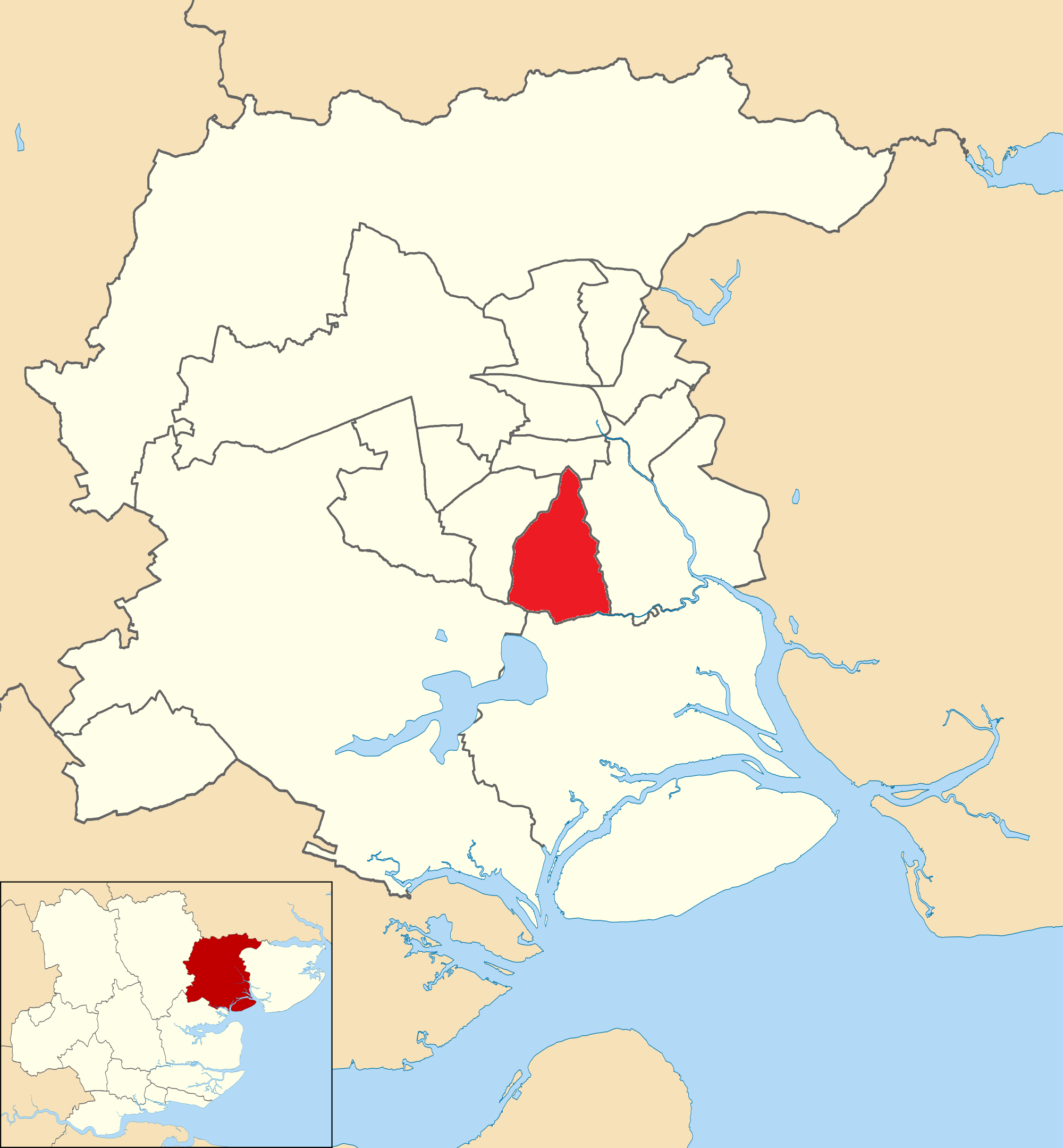
Berechurch ward

Berechurch
Party	Candidate	Votes	%	±%
Labour Co-op	Martyn Warnes*	1,418	69.3	+0.9
Conservative	Chris Piggott	402	19.7	−0.3
Liberal Democrats	Michaela Grossmann-Hislop	127	6.2	−2.0
Green	John Clifton	98	4.8	+1.5
Majority		1,016	49.6	+1.2
Turnout		2,045	27.8	−3.7
Registered electors		7,364		
Labour Co-op hold		Swing	▲0.6	

=== Castle ===
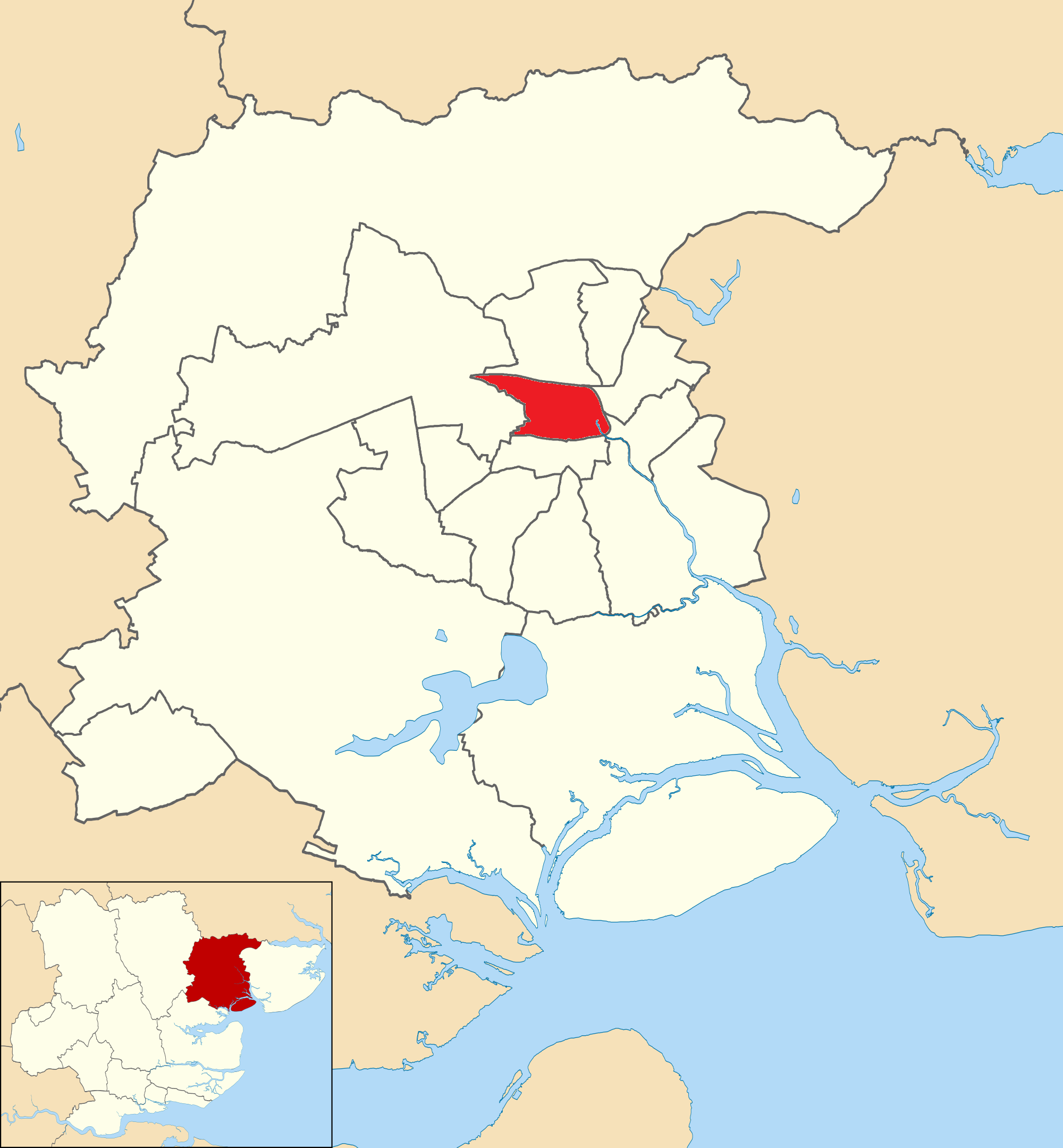
Castle ward

Castle
Party	Candidate	Votes	%	±%
Green	Richard Kirkby-Taylor	1,420	50.2	+12.4
Conservative	Simon Crow*	794	28.1	−4.4
Labour	Alan Short	360	12.7	−6.4
Liberal Democrats	Martin Gillingham	254	9.0	−1.6
Majority		626	22.1	+16.8
Turnout		2,828	35.5	−1.6
Registered electors		7,977		
Green gain from Conservative		Swing	▲8.4	

=== Greenstead ===
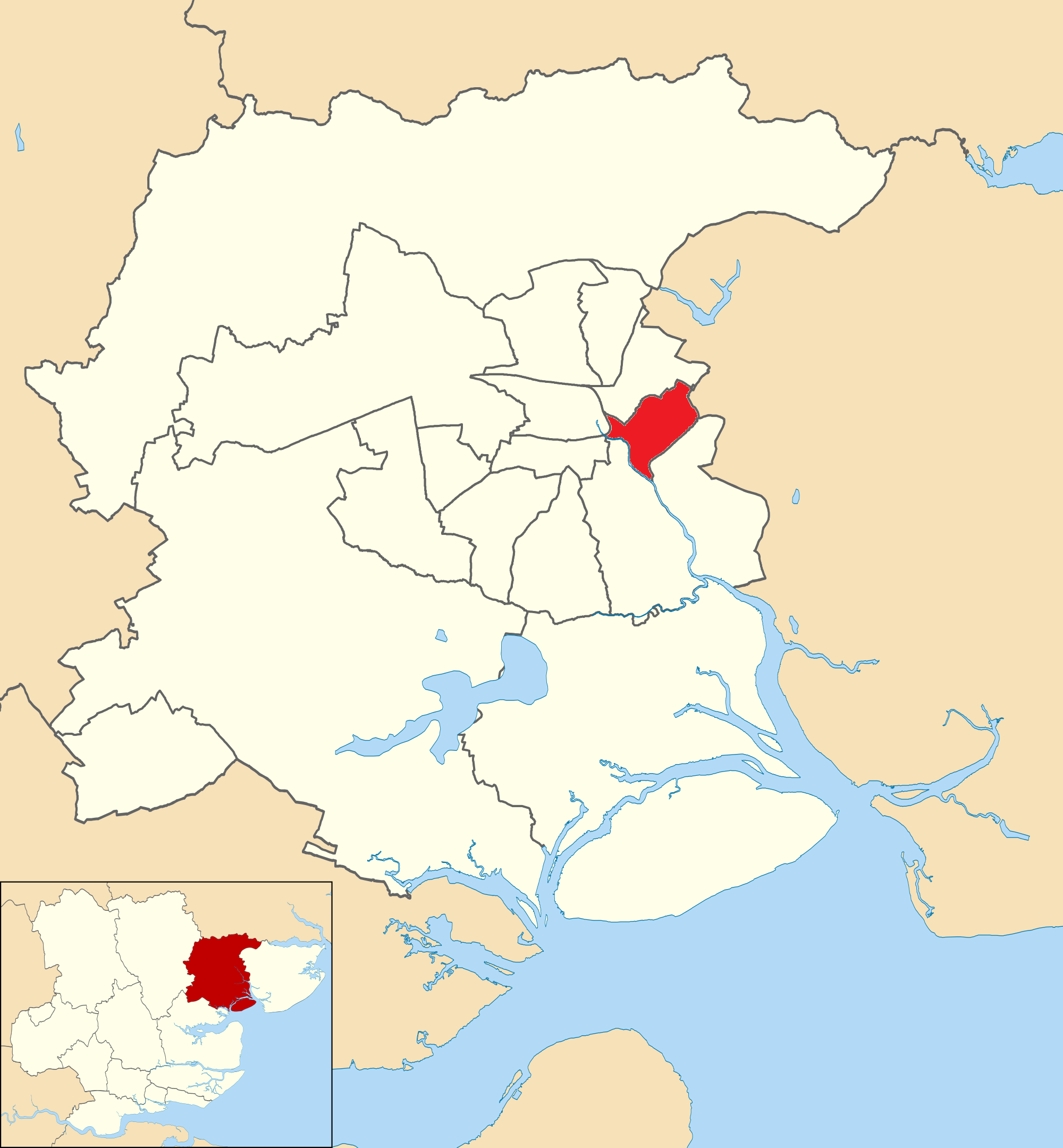
Greenstead ward

Greenstead
Party	Candidate	Votes	%	±%
Labour	Molly Bloomfield	1,194	59.1	+7.1
Conservative	Petra Crees	512	25.3	−3.1
Liberal Democrats	Shaun Boughton	184	9.1	−1.4
Green	Lisa Cross	132	6.5	+0.1
Majority		682	33.8	+10.2
Turnout		2,022	18.2	−1.1
Registered electors		11,134		
Labour hold		Swing	▲5.1	

No Reform UK (2.7%) candidate as previous.

=== Highwoods ===
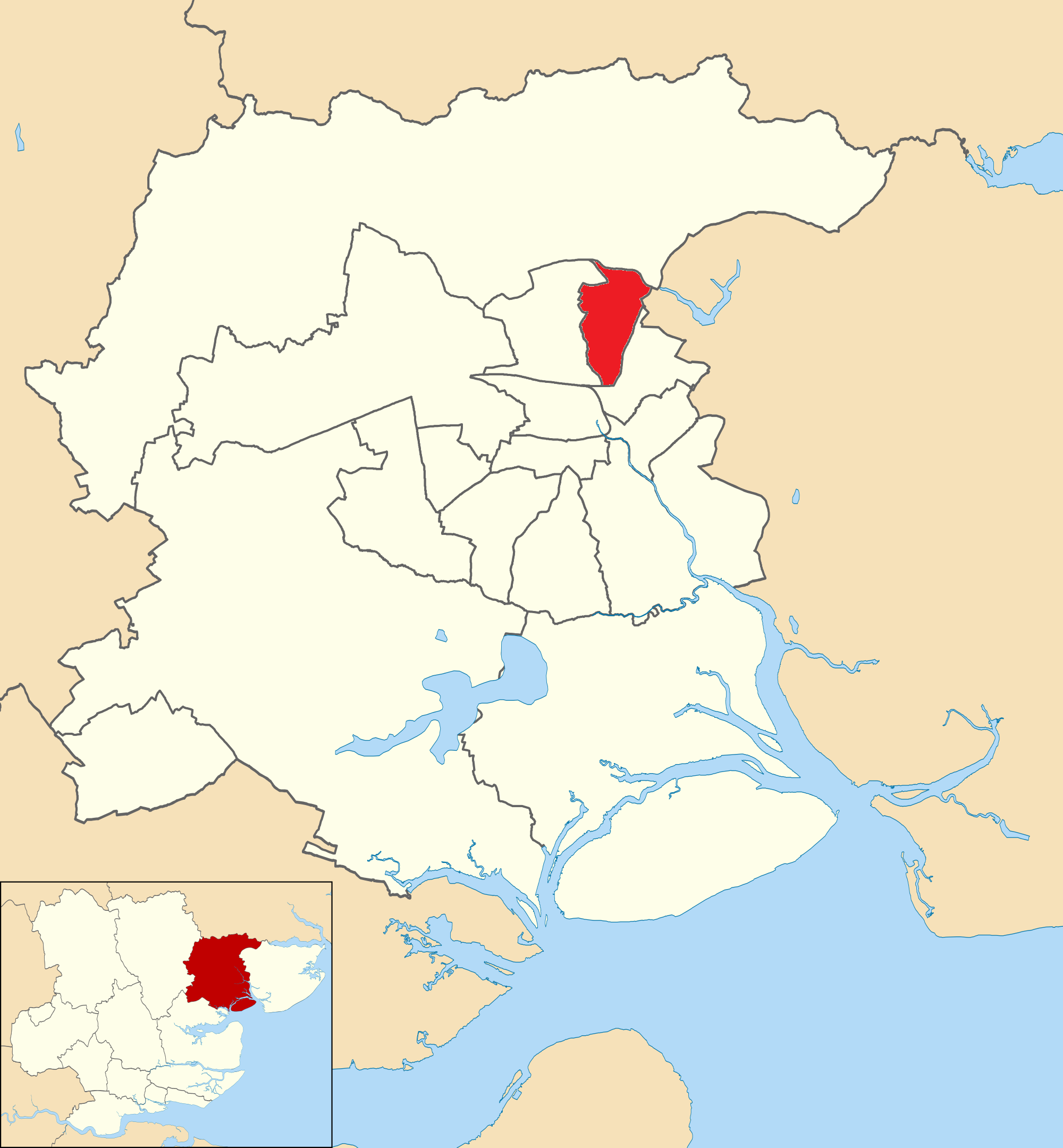
Highwoods ward

Highwoods
Party	Candidate	Votes	%	±%
Labour	Jocelyn Law	833	40.8	+22.8
Conservative	Stephen Rowe	773	37.9	+8.1
Liberal Democrats	Laura Cassidy	435	21.3	+12.9
Majority		60	2.9	N/A
Turnout		2,041	28.5	−1.8
Registered electors		7,171		
Labour gain from Independent		Swing	▲7.4	

No Independent (35.0%), Green (6.4%) or Reform UK (2.9%) candidates as previous.

=== Lexden & Braiswick ===
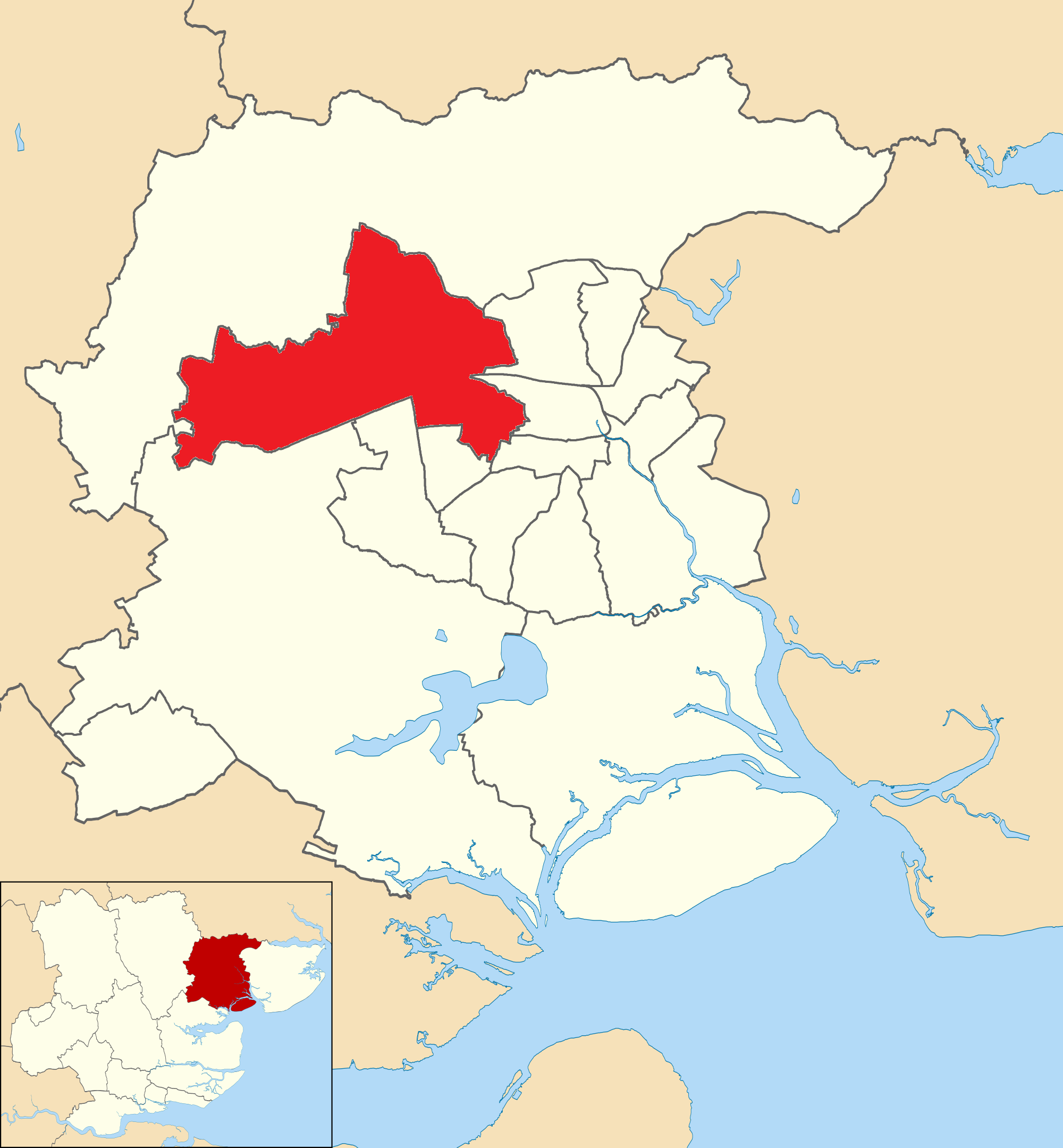
Lexden & Braiswick ward

Lexden & Braiswick
Party	Candidate	Votes	%	±%
Conservative	Martin Leatherdale*	1,416	51.8	−4.4
Liberal Democrats	Sandra Culham	607	22.2	+5.1
Labour	Stephen Novy	406	14.9	+3.5
Green	Roger Bamforth	302	11.1	−4.2
Majority		809	29.6	N/A
Turnout		2,731	37.3	−6.0
Registered electors		7,321		
Conservative hold		Swing	▼4.8	

=== Marks Tey & Layer ===
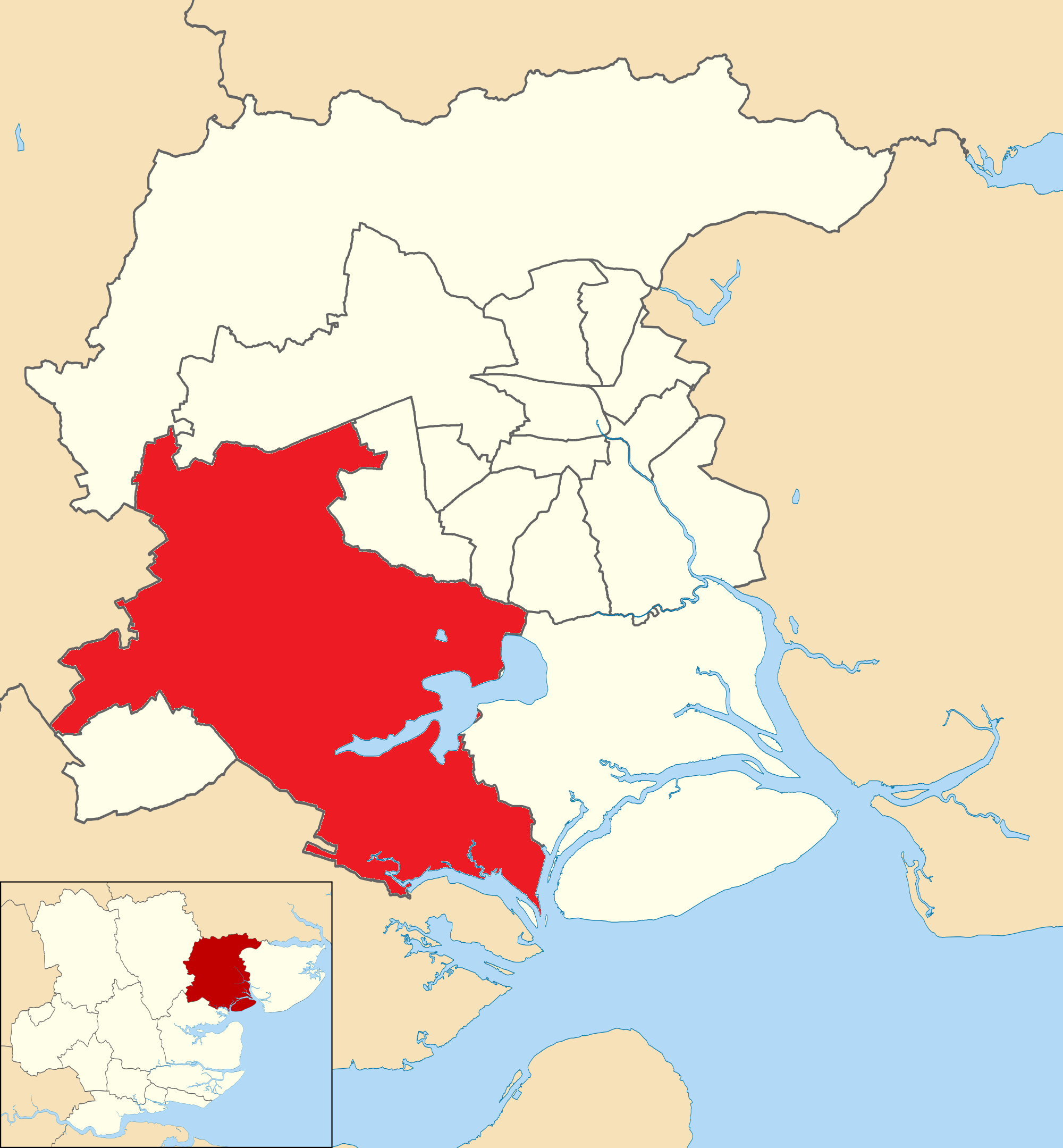
Marks Tey & Layer ward

Marks Tey & Layer
Party	Candidate	Votes	%	±%
Conservative	Jackie Maclean*	1,393	56.6	−10.8
Labour	Barry Gilheany	456	18.5	+6.9
Liberal Democrats	Mark Hull	381	15.5	+7.5
Green	Amy Sheridan	229	9.3	+1.0
Majority		937	38.1	−17.7
Turnout		2,459	30.4	−3.6
Registered electors		8,089		
Conservative hold		Swing	▼8.9	

No Independent (4.7%) candidate as previous.

=== Mersea & Pyefleet ===
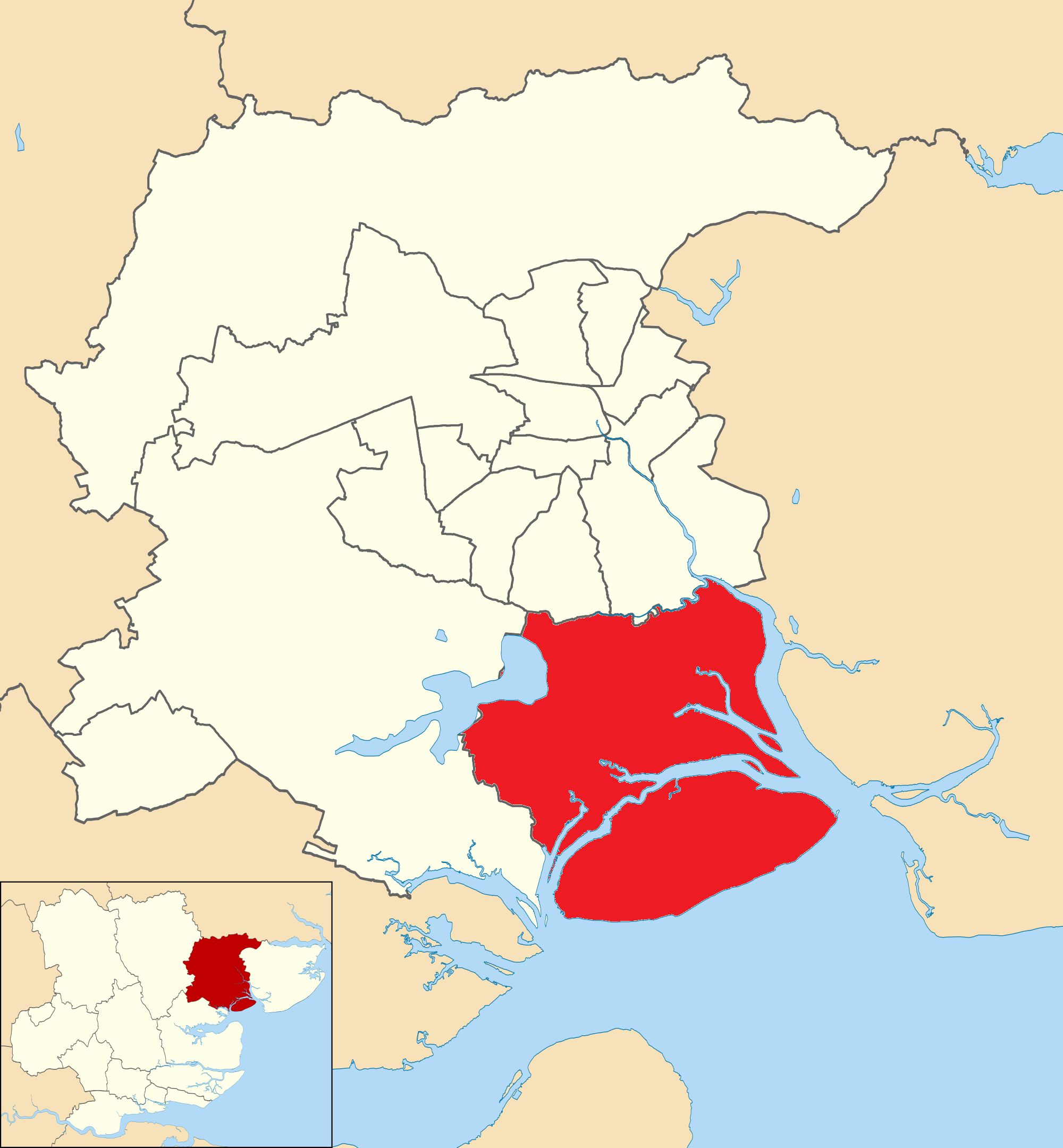
Mersea & Pyefleet ward

Mersea & Pyefleet
Party	Candidate	Votes	%	±%
Conservative	Robert Davidson*	1,742	65.0	−4.8
Labour	Natalie Eldred	521	19.5	+10.6
Liberal Democrats	Jennifer Stevens	415	15.5	+10.4
Majority		1,221	45.5	−8.2
Turnout		2,678	34.0	−3.7
Registered electors		7,888		
Conservative hold		Swing	▼7.7	

No Green (16.1%) candidate as previous.

=== Mile End ===
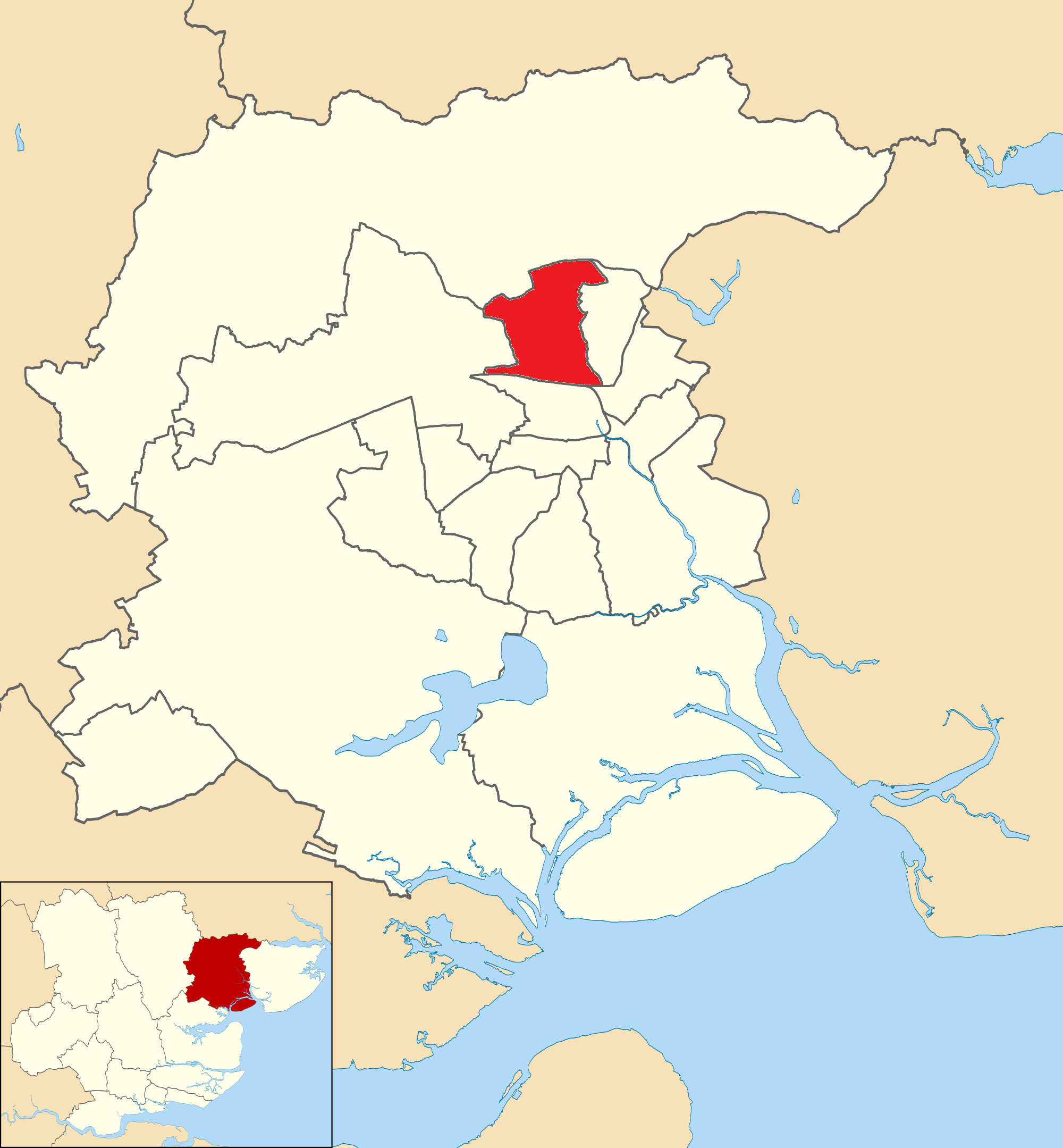
Mile End ward

Mile End
Party	Candidate	Votes	%	±%
Liberal Democrats	David King*	1,885	66.3	+1.0
Conservative	David Linghorn-Baker	447	15.7	−3.6
Labour Co-op	Pauline Bacon	350	12.3	+1.5
Green	Amanda Kirke	163	5.7	+1.1
Majority		1,438	50.6	+4.6
Turnout		2,845	30.4	−2.1
Registered electors		9,352		
Liberal Democrats hold		Swing	▲2.3	

=== New Town & Christ Church ===
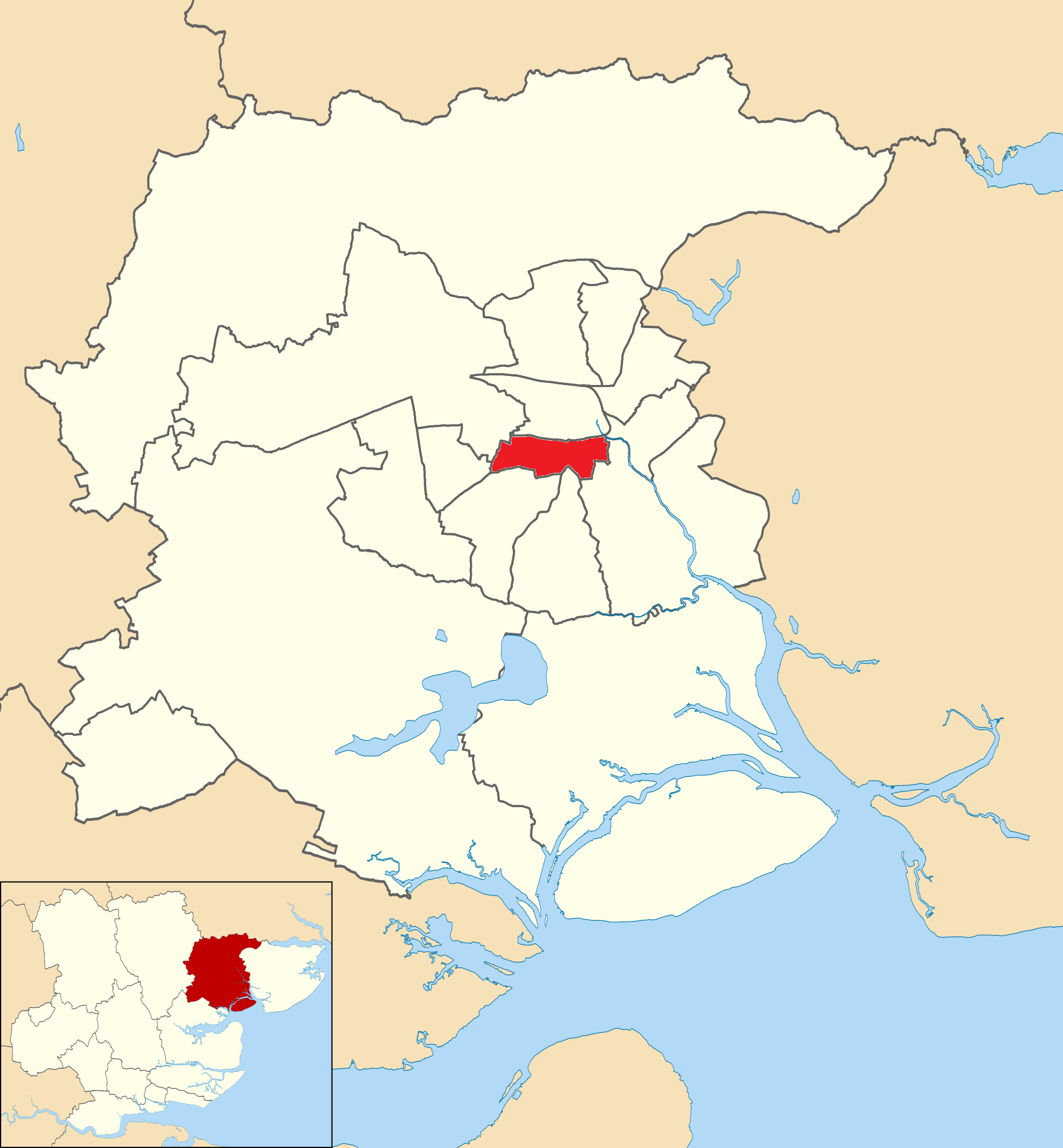
New Town & Christ Church ward

New Town & Christ Church (2 seats due to by-election)
Party	Candidate	Votes	%	±%
Labour	Kayleigh Rippingale	1,451	43.7	+0.3
Labour	Sam McLean	1,292	38.9	–4.5
Liberal Democrats	Catherine Spindler	1,089	32.8	+10.1
Liberal Democrats	Robin James	920	27.7	+5.0
Conservative	Annesley Hardy	580	17.4	–7.9
Conservative	Carla Hales	524	15.8	–9.5
Green	Clare Burgess	473	14.2	+5.6
Turnout		3,324	34.4	–1.1
Registered electors		9,668		
Labour hold				
Labour gain from Liberal Democrats				

=== Old Heath & The Hythe ===
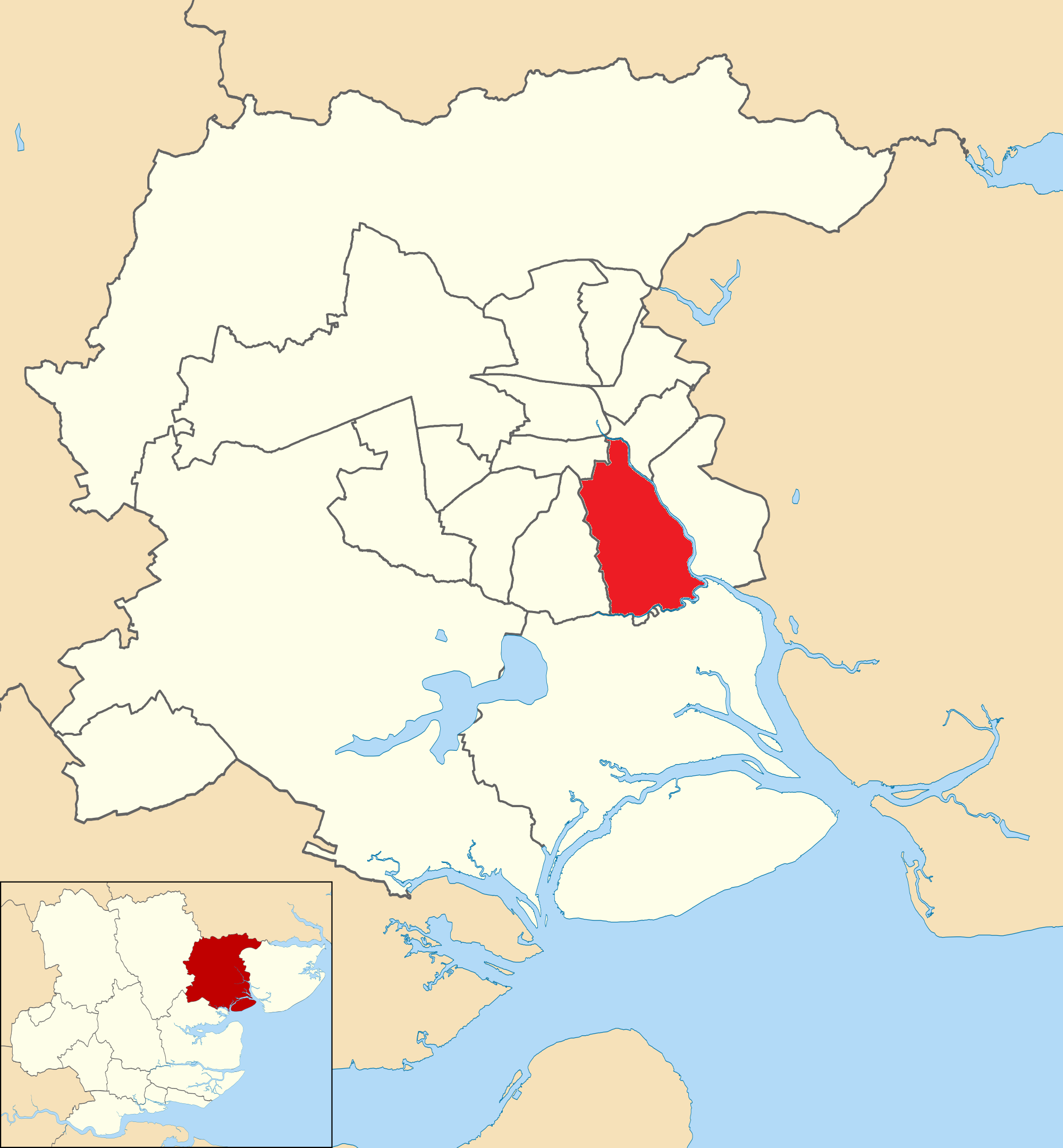
Old Heath & The Hythe ward

Old Heath & The Hythe
Party	Candidate	Votes	%	±%
Labour	Lee Scordis*	1,585	64.2	+10.9
Conservative	Richard Martin	502	20.3	−6.3
Green	Andrew Canessa	204	8.3	−2.6
Liberal Democrats	Peter Schraml	176	7.1	−2.0
Majority		1,083	43.9	+17.2
Turnout		2,467	28.8	−1.0
Registered electors		8,566		
Labour hold		Swing	▲8.6	

=== Prettygate ===
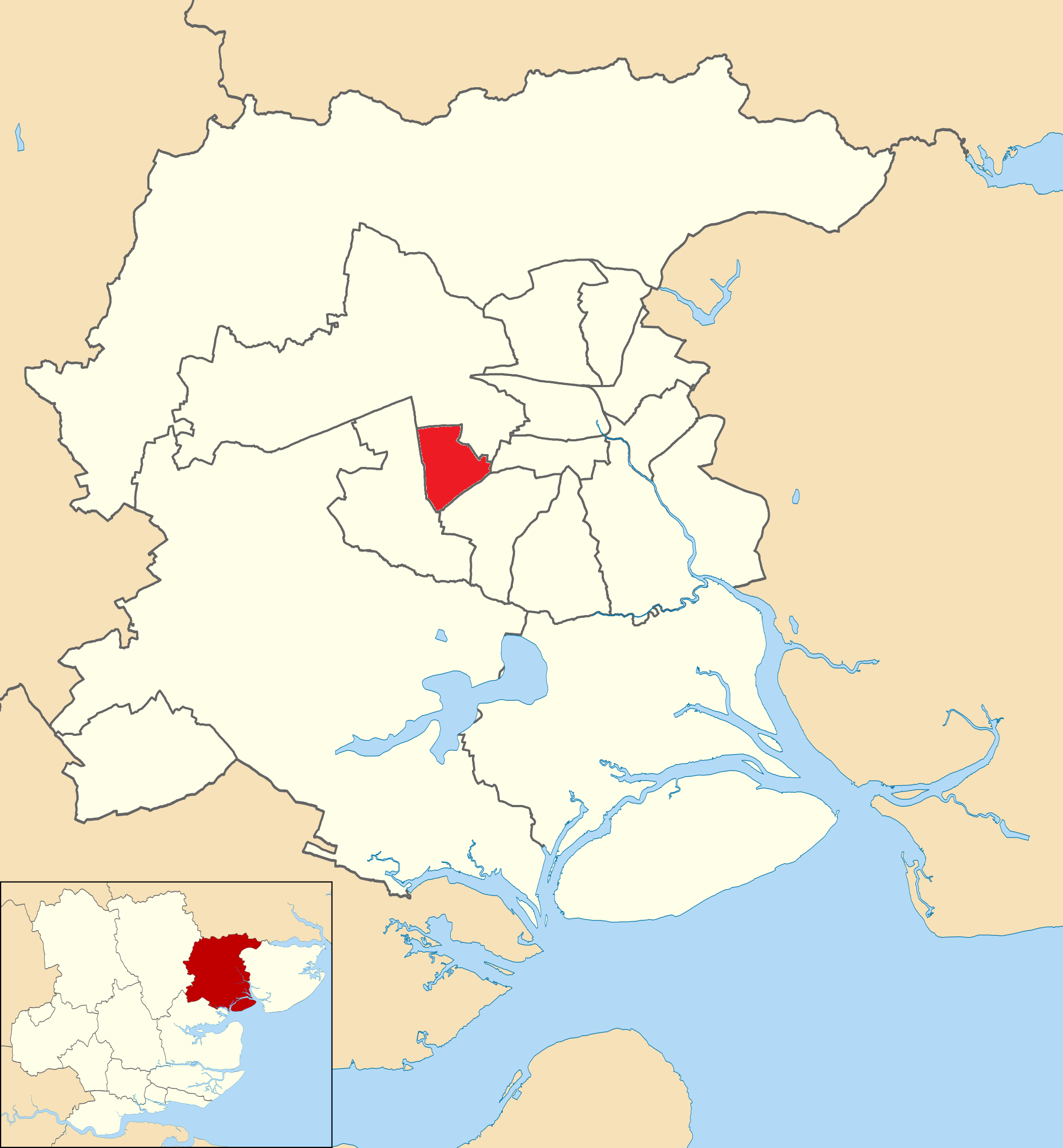
Prettygate ward

Prettygate
Party	Candidate	Votes	%	±%
Conservative	Roger Buston*	1,406	46.4	−13.9
Liberal Democrats	John Loxley	1,050	34.6	+19.2
Labour	Simon Collis	406	13.4	−1.1
Green	Natalie Edgoose	171	5.6	−4.2
Majority		356	11.8	N/A
Turnout		3,033	39.0	−1.7
Registered electors		7,773		
Conservative hold		Swing	▼16.7	

=== Rural North ===
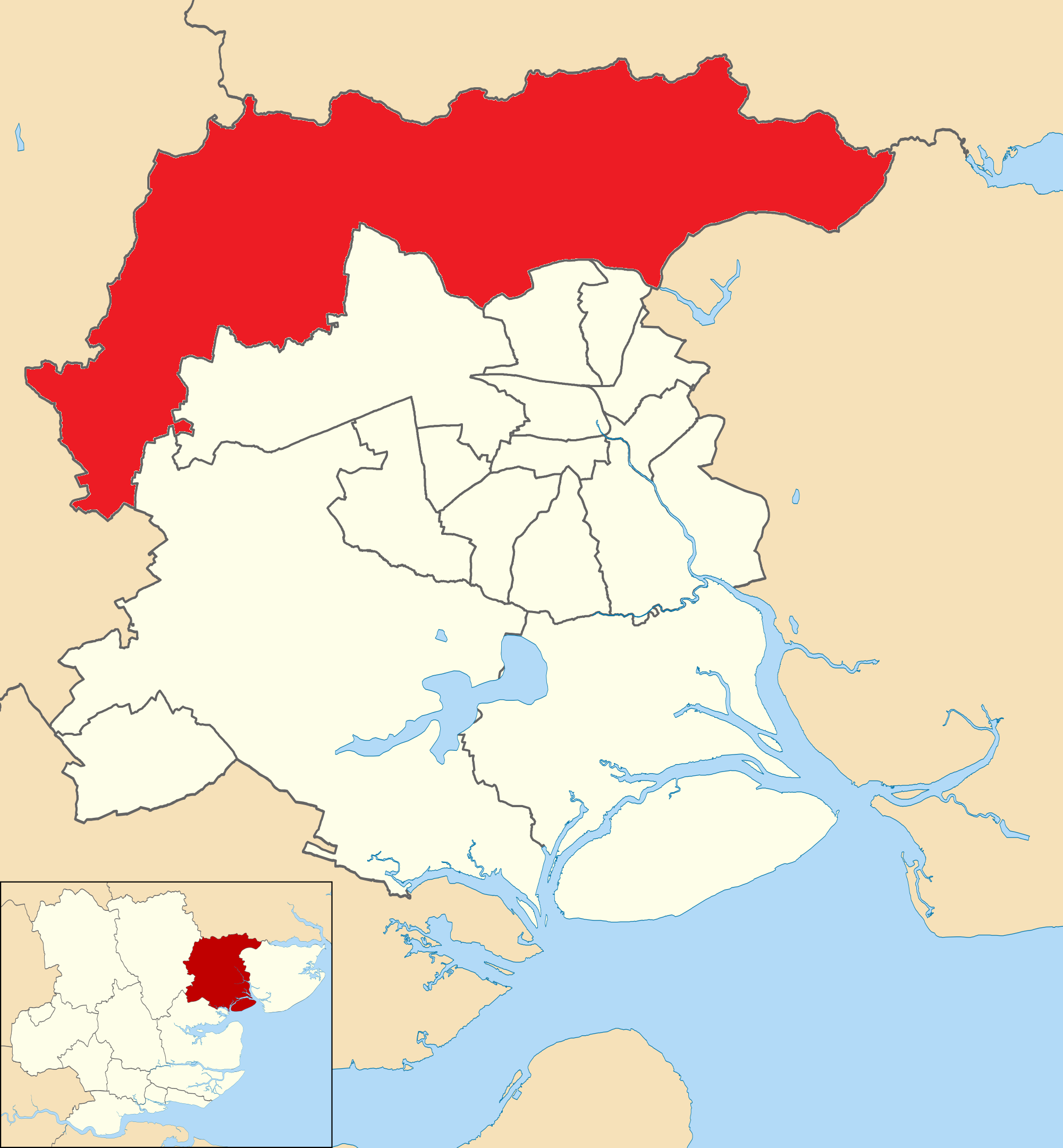
Rural North ward

Rural North
Party	Candidate	Votes	%	±%
Conservative	William Sunnucks	1,731	57.5	−7.0
Liberal Democrats	William Brown	504	16.7	+6.2
Green	Sue Bailey	391	13.0	+1.1
Labour	Neil Jones	386	12.8	+2.1
Majority		1,227	40.8	−11.8
Turnout		3,012	35.9	−4.3
Registered electors		8,383		
Conservative hold		Swing	▼6.6	

No Reform UK (2.5%) candidate as previous.

=== Shrub End ===
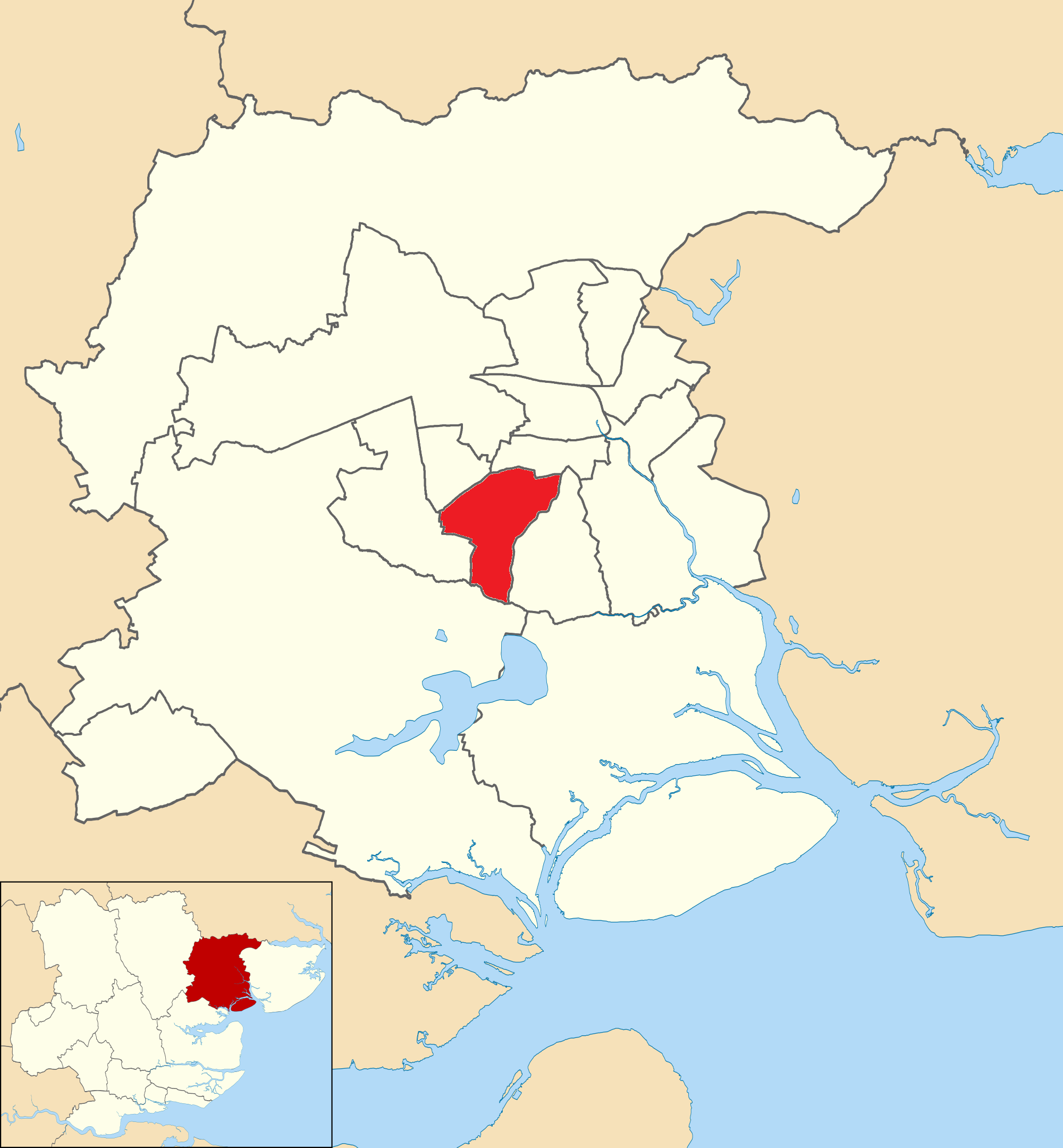
Shrub End ward

Shrub End
Party	Candidate	Votes	%	±%
Liberal Democrats	Mick Spindler	826	39.2	+2.2
Conservative	Angela Linghorn-Baker	660	31.3	−4.0
Labour	Luke Hayes	623	29.5	+10.7
Majority		166	7.9	+6.2
Turnout		2,109	26.6	−0.5
Registered electors		7,579		
Liberal Democrats gain from Conservative		Swing	▲3.1	

No Green (6.1%) or Reform UK (2.8%) candidates as previous.

=== St. Anne's & St. John's ===
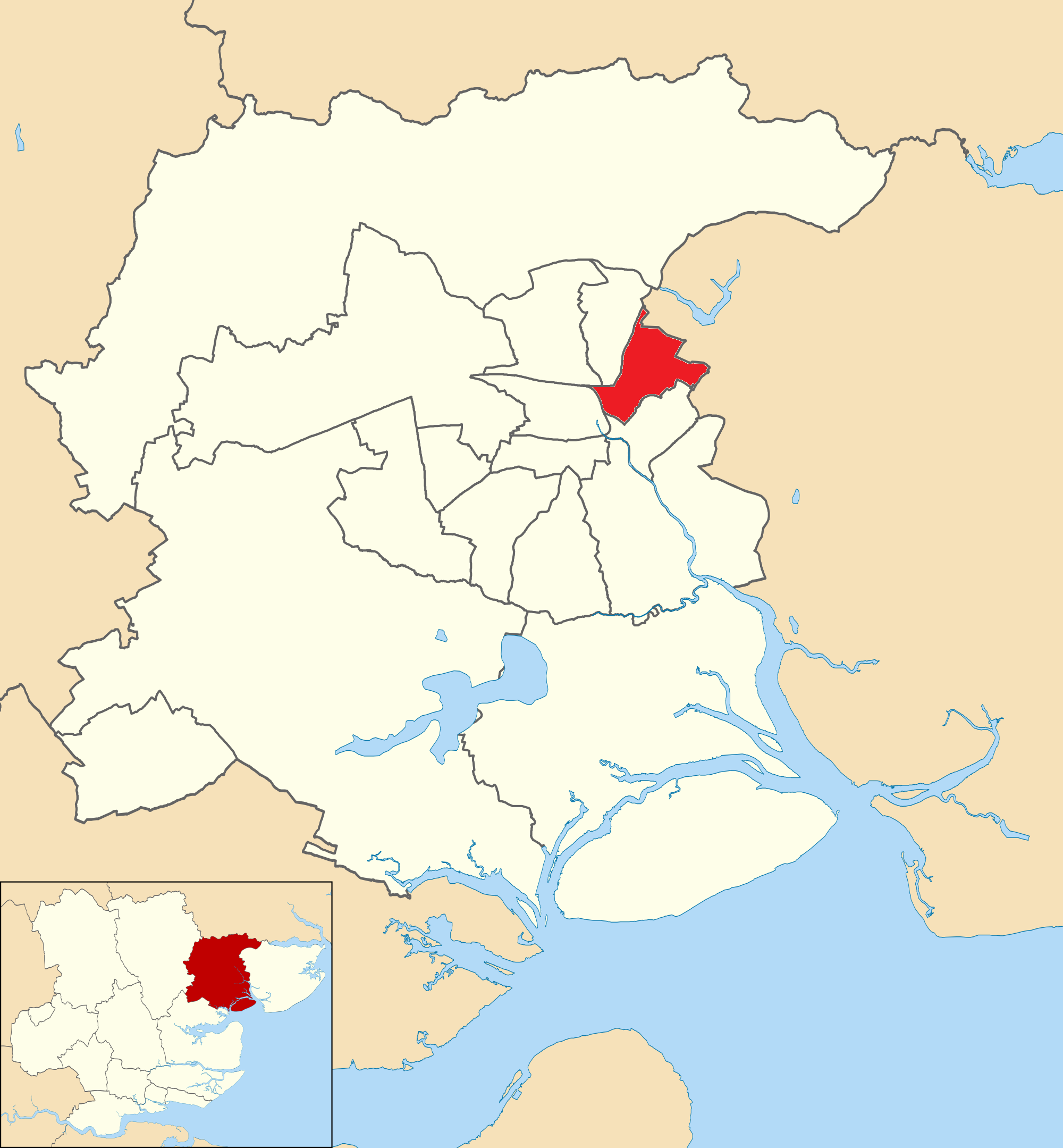
St. Anne's & St. John's ward

St. Anne's & St. John's
Party	Candidate	Votes	%	±%
Liberal Democrats	Paul Smith	1,478	51.8	+9.8
Conservative	Thomas Rowe	986	34.5	−6.6
Labour	Abigail Chambers	390	13.7	+3.5
Majority		492	17.3	+16.4
Turnout		2,854	35.0	−0.8
Registered electors		8,157		
Liberal Democrats gain from Conservative		Swing	▲8.2	

No Green (6.8%) candidate as previous.

=== Stanway ===
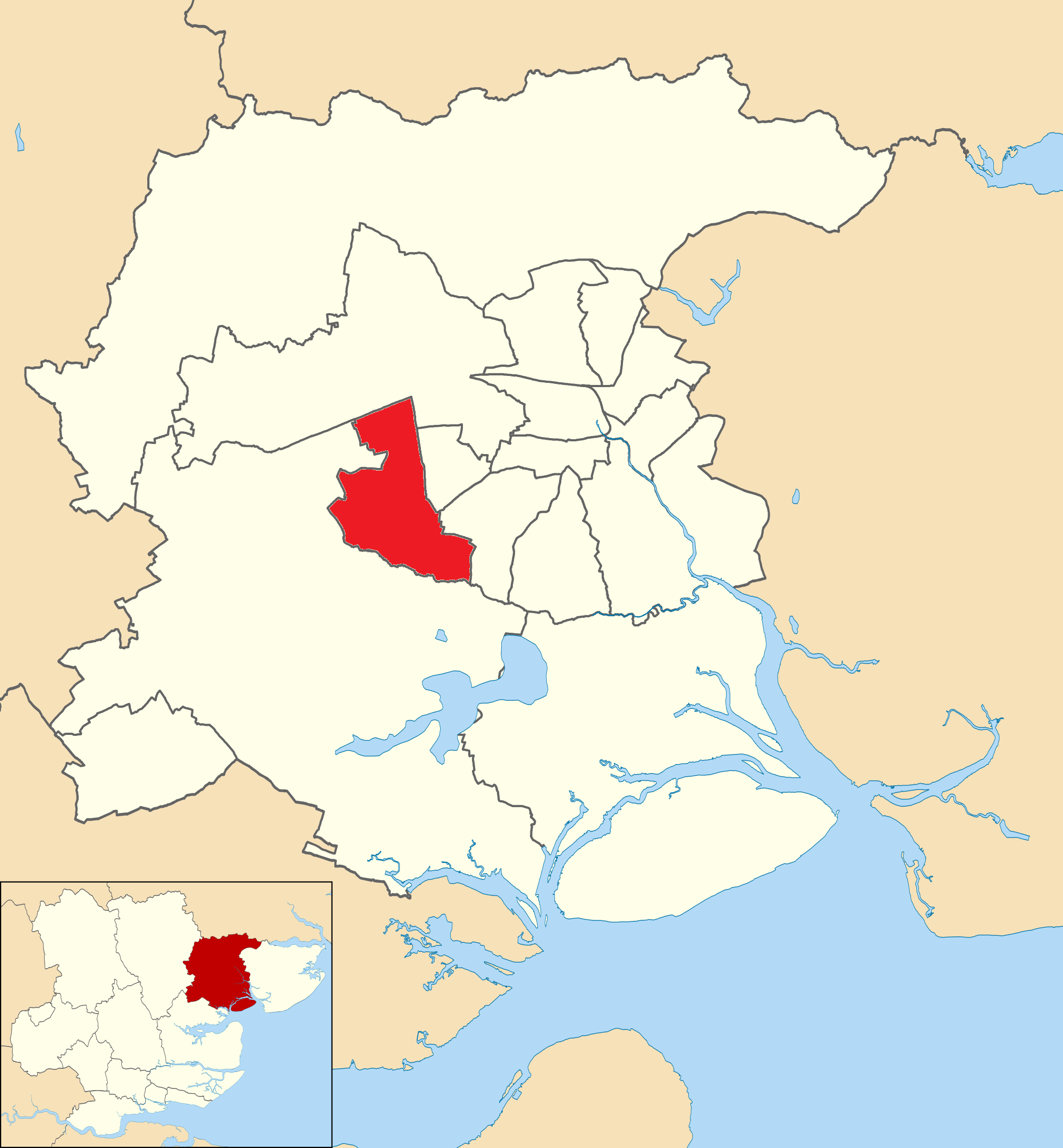
Stanway ward

Stanway
Party	Candidate	Votes	%	±%
Liberal Democrats	Tracy Arnold	1,302	53.8	+14.3
Conservative	Paul Dundas*	907	37.5	−8.9
Labour	Jim Pey	211	8.7	−1.1
Majority		395	16.3	N/A
Turnout		2,420	35.0	−0.9
Registered electors		6,922		
Liberal Democrats gain from Conservative		Swing	▲11.6	

No Green (4.4%) candidate as previous.

=== Tiptree ===
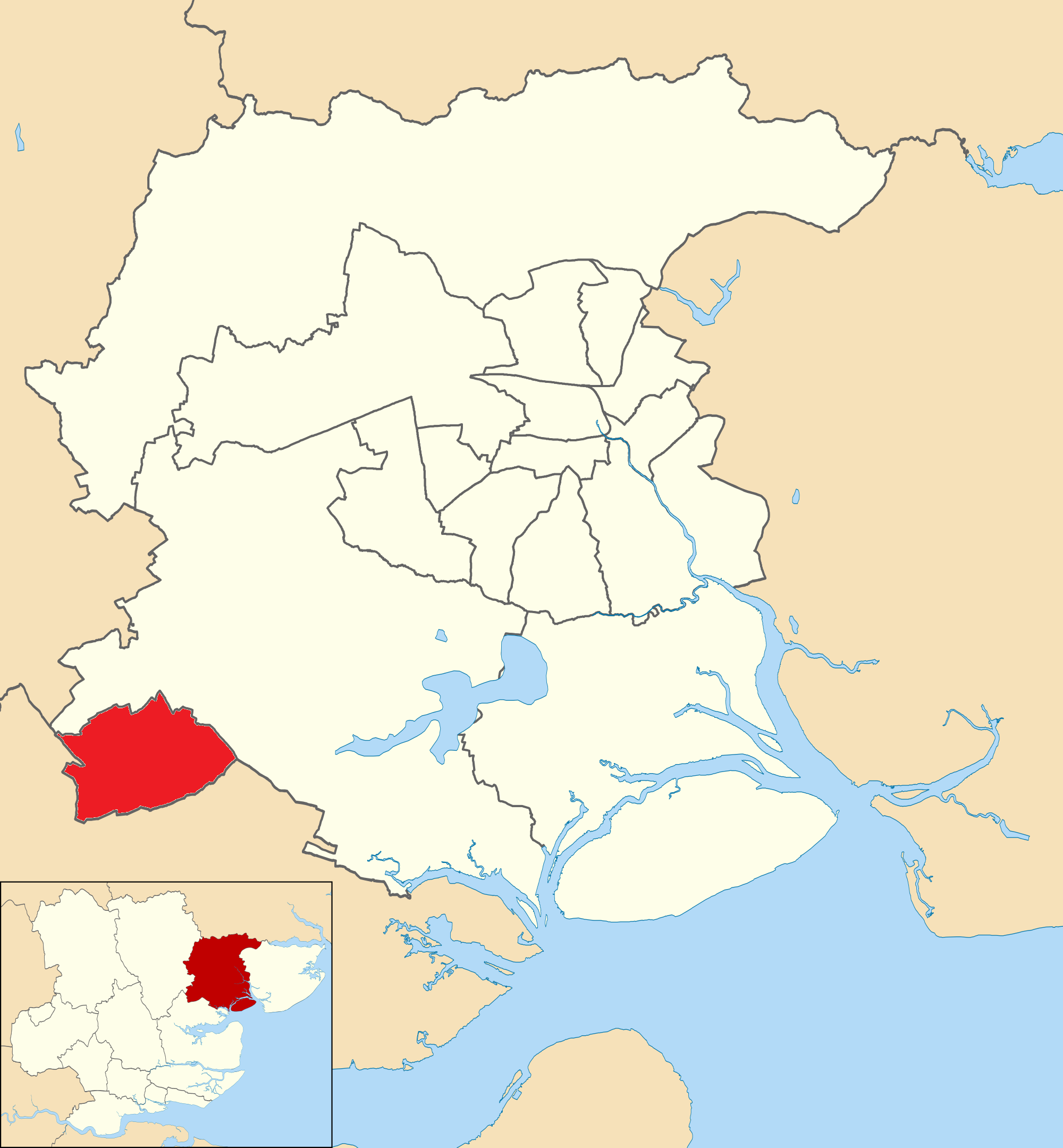
Tiptree ward

Tiptree
Party	Candidate	Votes	%	±%
Conservative	Rhys Smithson	1,351	61.6	−10.4
Labour	Ian Yates	395	18.0	+5.9
Liberal Democrats	Kieron Franks	284	13.0	+5.8
Green	John McArthur	163	7.4	−1.3
Majority		956	43.6	−16.3
Turnout		2,193	30.1	−2.4
Registered electors		7,288		
Conservative hold		Swing	▼8.2	

=== Wivenhoe ===
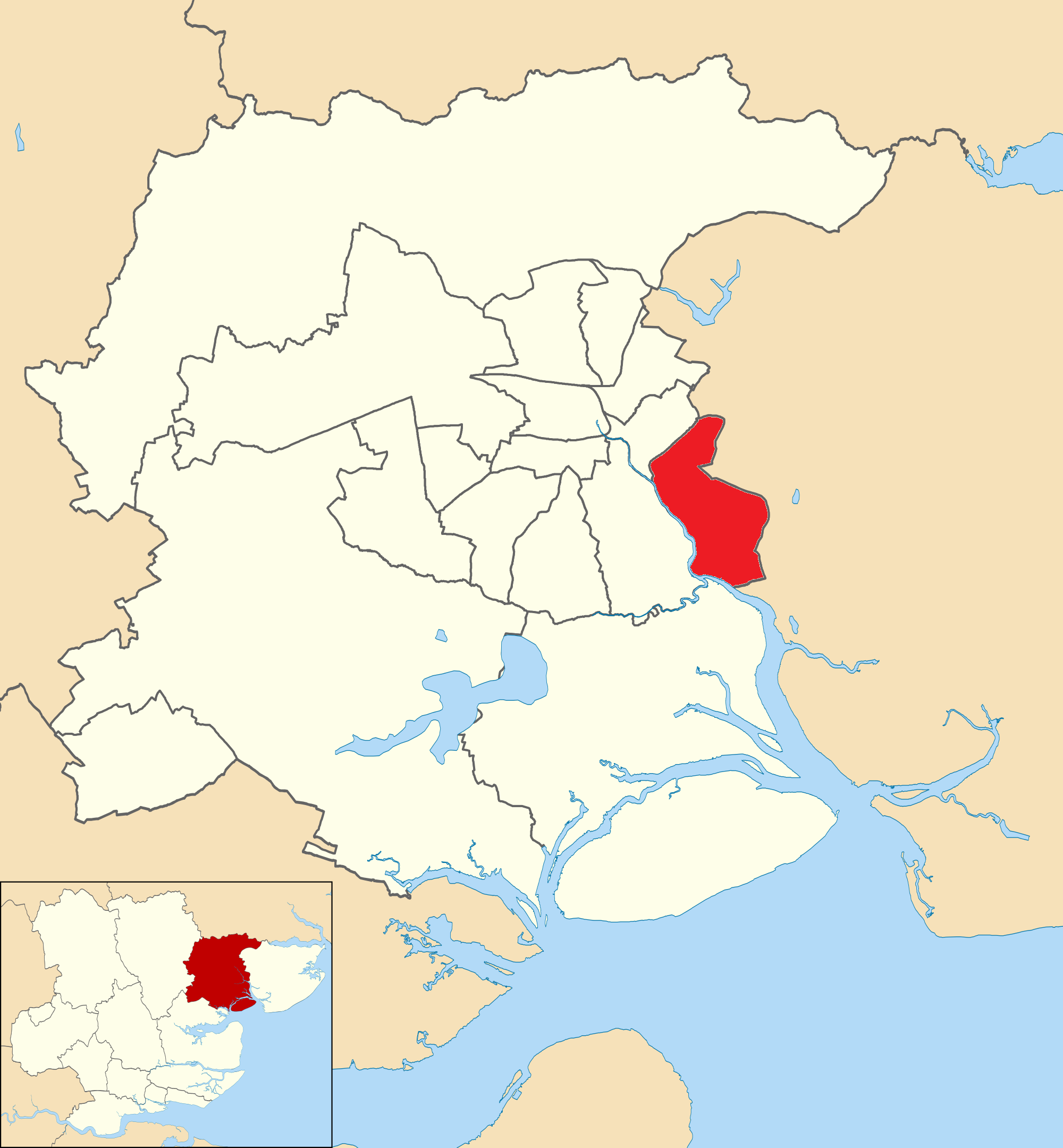
Wivenhoe ward

Wivenhoe
Party	Candidate	Votes	%	±%
Liberal Democrats	Andrea Luxford-Vaughan*	1,814	56.8	+18.4
Labour Co-op	Cyril Liddy	1,034	32.4	+0.9
Conservative	Mollie Ireland	182	5.7	−9.6
Green	Christopher Blomeley	163	5.1	−9.2
Majority		780	24.4	+17.5
Turnout		3,193	43.7	+1.8
Registered electors		7,307		
Liberal Democrats hold		Swing	▲8.8	

== Post-election changes ==
- On 30 May 2022, Martin Leatherdale (Lexden & Braiswick) left the Conservative group to sit as an independent. He resigned as a councillor several days later, triggering a by-election.
- On 28 September 2022, Mark Goacher (Castle) left the Green group to sit as an independent.
- On 20 October 2022, Independent councillors Beverley Oxford and Gerard Oxford (both Highwoods) resigned, triggering a double by-election.
- On 24 November 2022, Colchester was granted city status, and Colchester Borough Council became Colchester City Council.
- On 15 December 2022, Green group leader Steph Nissen (Castle) left the Green Party and joined Labour. On the same day, Mark Goacher rejoined the Green group and subsequently became its leader.
- On 2 March 2023, Labour group leader Adam Fox (Old Heath & The Hythe) announced that he would stand down as a councillor at the May 2023 election.
- On 8 March 2023, Chris Pearson (Berechurch) was elected Labour group leader.

=== By-elections ===
==== Lexden & Braiswick ====
The by-election was triggered by the resignation of Martin Leatherdale, who had left the Conservative group to sit as an independent days earlier; Leatherdale, who manages Colchester's Lion Walk Shopping Centre, said he wished to concentrate on town-centre development projects that were "not always aligned with the political dynamics of a large group of people."

Lexden & Braiswick by-election: 28 July 2022
Party	Candidate	Votes	%	±%
Conservative	Sara Naylor	1,372	63.7	+11.8
Liberal Democrats	Kieron Franks	621	28.8	+6.6
Labour	Catherine Bickersteth	161	7.5	−7.4
Majority		751	34.9	+5.3
Turnout		2,158	29.3	−8.0
Registered electors		7,368		
Conservative gain from Independent		Swing	▲2.6	

The Green Party, which received 11.1% in the ward in May 2022, did not contest the by-election.

==== Highwoods ====
The double by-election was triggered by the resignation of independent councillor Gerard Oxford, a wheelchair user and former Mayor of Colchester, over the council's continued failure to relocate meetings to accessible venues; his wife and fellow Highwoods councillor Beverley Oxford resigned in solidarity, ending a combined 43 years of service between them.

Highwoods by-election: 8 December 2022
Party	Candidate	Votes	%	±%
Labour	Catherine Bickersteth	653	42.3	+1.5
Liberal Democrats	Alison Jay	618	40.1	+18.8
Labour	Pauline Bacon	501	32.5	−8.3
Conservative	Richard Martin	430	27.9	−10.0
Conservative	David Linghorn-Baker	413	26.8	−11.1
Liberal Democrats	Chantelle-Louise Whyborn	366	23.7	+2.4
Turnout		1,543	21.4	−7.1
Registered electors		7,196		
Labour gain from Independent				
Liberal Democrats gain from Independent				
