= Upper Tal-y-fan, Dingestow =

Upper Tal-y-fan
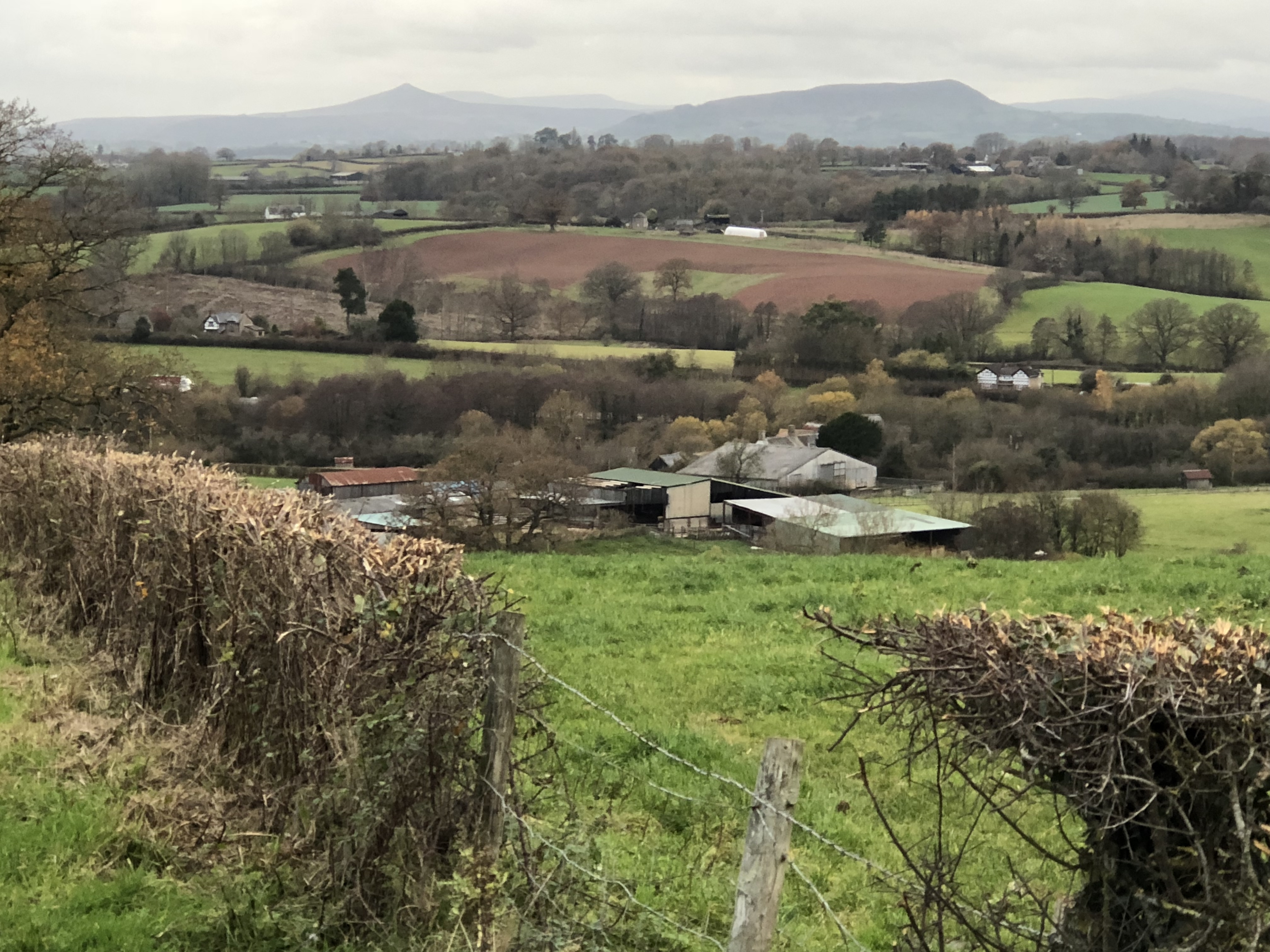
- "a zany-looking group"

- Location within Monmouthshire
- 51.774°N 2.7958°W
- Type: House
- Location: Dingestow, Monmouthshire

History
- Built: late Medieval

Site notes
- Architectural style: vernacular
- Governing body: Privately owned

Listed Building – Grade II*
- Official name: Upper Tal-y-fan
- Designated: 27 September 2001
- Reference no.: 25777

Upper Tal-y-fan, Dingestow, Monmouthshire is a farmhouse dating from the late-Medieval period. Subsequently, enlarged, it remains a private house and is a Grade II* listed building.

== History ==
Sir Cyril Fox and Lord Raglan, in the first of their three-volume study Monmouthshire Houses. describe the architectural history of Tal-y-fan as "difficult to make out". They identified two cruck trusses of a medieval date, and suggested that "the transformation of this medieval building was a slow process". Cadw goes no further than describing the original building as "late-medieval". The architectural historian John Newman posits a date of the late 15th or early 16th centuries, identifying an internal doorhead of "identical" design to one of 1599 at Allt-y-Bela. The farmhouse was subsequently expanded and then fully renovated in the late 20th century. As at May 2021, the property was for sale.

== Architecture and description ==
Fox and Raglan undertook a detailed study of the house, including gathering photographic evidence. John Newman describes the current arrangement as "zany-looking", with the earlier wings of the farmhouse "kinking obliquely" and linked by a later extension. These are constructed of whitewashed rubble. The interior is "remarkably intact". The house remains the privately owned farmhouse to a working farm and is a Grade II* listed building.
