= Pam Cox =

English politician and social history professor

Pam Cox MP
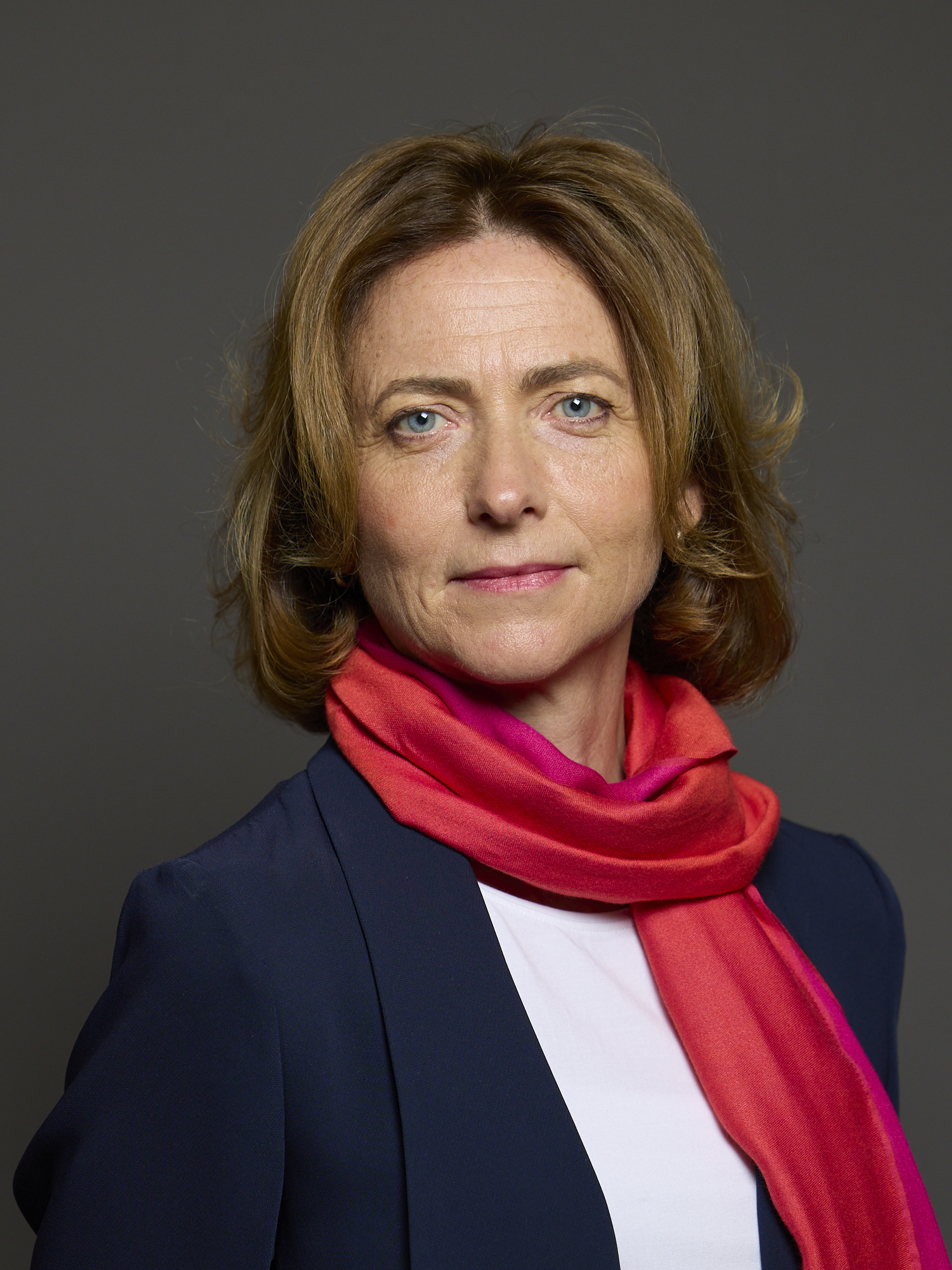
- Official portrait, 2024

Member of Parliament for Colchester
- Incumbent
- Assumed office 4 July 2024
- Preceded by: Will Quince
- Majority: 8,250 (18.4%)

Personal details
- Born: Pamela Margaret Cox Southend-on-Sea, Essex, England
- Party: Labour
- Education: University of Cambridge (BA, Ph.D.)

Academic background
- Thesis: Rescue and reform Girls, delinquency and industrial schools 1908-1933 (1997)

Pamela Margaret Cox is a British Labour Party politician and academic who has served as Member of Parliament (MP) for Colchester since 2024.

== Biography ==
Pamela Cox was brought up in Southend. Her mother was a midwife before becoming a nurse. Her father left school at the age of 15 and was apprenticed as a joiner before joining the church and becoming a minister. She has two sisters, both of whom became nurses in south Essex.

Cox studied history at Robinson College, Cambridge, and in 1997 was awarded a PhD for a thesis on the history of girls' delinquency in Britain. Prior to her election as an MP, she was a professor of social history and criminology at the University of Essex, and has been a fellow of the Royal Society of Arts since 2017. She presented the BBC documentary series, Shopgirls: The True Story of Life Behind the Counter and Servants: The True Story of Life Below Stairs, and has contributed to historical and cultural programmes for Channel 4 and Channel 5 including Edwardian Britain in Colour.

== Politics ==
In 1994, Cox joined the Labour Party. She was elected as a New Town and Christ Church councillor on Colchester City Council in May 2021, and on 5 November 2022 she became the Labour Party prospective parliamentary candidate in the 2024 general election for Colchester. At the election, she took the seat from the Conservative Party with 18,804 votes, a majority of 18.4% over the Conservative candidate James Cracknell who won 10,554 votes. Her election to Parliament made her the first Labour MP to win the seat since Charles Delacourt-Smith in the 1945 general election and the first woman to represent the constituency in its history.

In September 2024, Cox followed the Labour government in voting to means test the Winter Fuel Payment, so only low-income pensioners who claimed Pension Credit would receive it. After facing criticism by the Colchester Liberal Democrats, Cox said she did not want to vote for this measure but that it was necessary for the Labour government to make "tough decisions" to stabilise the country. In October 2024, she gave her support to the Labour government's offer of £1 million to Essex County Council to fund its own financial assistance scheme for pensioners affected by this change.

In November 2024 and June 2025, Cox voted in favour of the Terminally Ill Adults (End of Life) Bill at its second and third readings, which proposes to legalise assisted dying for terminally ill adults in England and Wales. This made her the only MP in North Essex to vote for the bill. Explaining her support for the bill, Cox said she believed in personal freedom and the free choice for people to do what they want with their own bodies as long as it is within the law, including the ability to choose "a compassionate and dignified death", while also maintaining that there must be legal safeguards in place to "ensure that only those with the capacity to make a clear, settled and informed decision are eligible". She also said there was "now a clear majority of the public who support a change in the law" and that the decision of Parliament should reflect this.

In September 2025, Cox resigned from Colchester City Council to focus on her parliamentary duties. In July 2026, she was appointed Parliamentary Private Secretary to the Northern Ireland Office.

== Works ==
- Becoming Delinquent: British and European Youth, 1650-1950 (2002) (co-authored with Heather Shore)
- Gender, Justice and Welfare: Bad Girls in Britain, 1900-1950 (2003)
- Young Criminal Lives: Life Courses and Life Chances from 1850 (2017) (co-authored with Barry Godfrey, Heather Shore and Zoe Alker)
- Shopgirls: the True Story of Life Behind the Counter (2014) (co-authored with Annabel Hobley)
- Criminology: A Sociological Introduction (2014) (co-authored by Eamonn Carrabine, Pete Fussey, Dick Hobbs, Nigel South, Darren Thiel, Jackie Turton)

Parliament of the United Kingdom
Preceded by Will Quince	Member of Parliament for Colchester; 2024–present	Incumbent
