= Charles Howard Smith (trade unionist) =

British trade union leader

- Born: 1 September 1875; Birmingham, U.K.
- Died: 5 January 1965 (aged 89); Ramsgate, U.K.
- Education: Birmingham Blue Coat School
- Employers: The Birmingham News; Amalgamated Engineering and Stores Association; Post Office Engineering Union

Charles Howard Smith (1 September 1875 – 5 January 1965) was a British trade union leader.

Born in Birmingham, Smith was educated at Birmingham Blue Coat School. He worked as a copy-holder for a printer, but learnt shorthand in his spare time, and this enabled him to find work as a journalist with the Birmingham News. A friend of his manager was involved in the Amalgamated Engineering and Stores Association, and in 1907, when its conference was held in Birmingham, he asked Smith to take the minutes. The union remembered his service, and from 1910 he took the minutes at each meeting of the executive. He took on an increasing amount of the general secretary's work himself, and in 1914 he left the News to take this full-time role.

In 1915, Smith took the union into a merger which formed the Post Office Engineering Union (POEU). He was noted for his skills in administration and negotiation, and achieved agreements on subsistence payments and job security which endured for many years. He retired in 1938, moving to Ramsgate, where he died in 1965.

In 1962, the POEU began funding an annual scholarship to Ruskin College, which it named after Smith.

Trade union offices
Preceded by George Young	General Secretary of the Amalgamated Engineering and Stores Association; 1914–1915	Succeeded by Union merged
Preceded by New position	General Secretary of the Post Office Engineering Union; 1915–1938	Succeeded by John Edwards
