= Shopgirls: The True Story of Life Behind the Counter =

BBC historical documentary

Shopgirls: The True Story of Life Behind the Counter is a BBC TV series presented by professor Pamela Cox. It was produced by Annabel Hobley.

== Episodes ==
No.	Name	Presenter	Executive Producer
1	Here Come the Girls	Pamela Cox	Annabel Hobley
2	Revolution on the Floor	Pamela Cox	Annabel Hobley
3	The New Cool	Pamela Cox	Annabel Hobley
