= Cross at Croes Llwyd Farm =

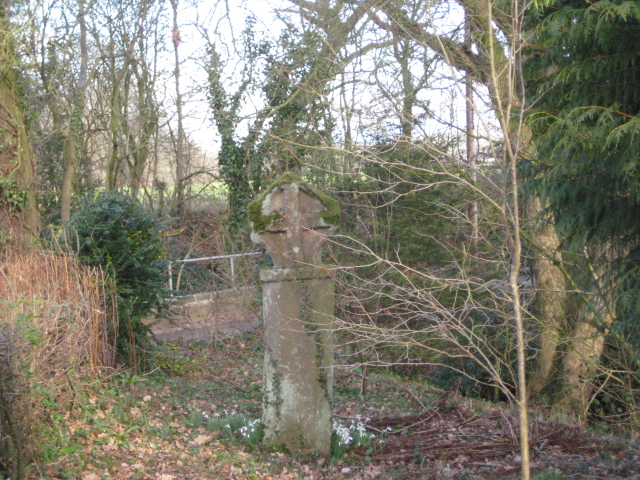
- "a very rare survival of a medieval boundary marker"

- Location within Monmouthshire
- 51.7292°N 2.7462°W
- Type: Cross
- Location: Raglan, Monmouthshire

History
- Built: late 16th century

Site notes
- Architectural style: Vernacular
- Governing body: Privately owned

Listed Building – Grade I
- Official name: Cross at Croes Lwyd
- Designated: 31 January 2001
- Reference no.: 24716

Scheduled monument
- Official name: Cross at Croes Lwyd Farm
- Reference no.: MM156

The Cross at Croes Llwyd Farm, Raglan, Monmouthshire is a medieval cross which indicated a boundary of the Lordship of Raglan. As a rare medieval survival, it is both a Grade I listed structure and a Scheduled monument.

== History and description ==
The cross stands on Broom Lane, to the east of Broom House, off the Raglan to Usk road. It is 1.9 metres (6.2 ft) high, with an octagonal shaft. The Monmouthshire antiquarian Sir Joseph Bradney, in his multi-volume A History of Monmouthshire from the Coming of the Normans into Wales down to the Present Time, described it as a "singularly well-preserved stone, the head and shaft being hewn out of the same piece." The cross was the subject of Article 452 in the series Monmouthshire Sketchbook by the author and artist Fred Hando for the South Wales Argus between 1922 and 1970. Hando wrote that the cross was one of the only two remaining crosses in Monmouthshire, from a total of seventy-nine, which had survived with its head intact following the "Puritan folly of 1643." He described its name, the "White Cross", as deriving from its whitewashed appearance but suggested "the appropriate name should be Grey Cross" and that the cross was "at least five centuries" old. The cross is a Grade I listed structure and a scheduled monument.

The cross appears to have had a dual purpose, as a preaching cross and as a boundary marker for the delineation of the medieval Lordship of Raglan. Bradney records the mention of the cross in the grant of lands to William Herbert, "...and from this directly to a cross called Crosse Lloyd". Elizabeth Harcourt Mitchell, in her study, The Crosses of Monmouthshire published in 1893, also notes that Croes Llwyd is the only wayside cross in the county which retains its carved head, suggesting that its survival was due to the absence of figurative carving. (Note: Mitchell notes that the only other Monmouthshire cross which retains its head stands in the churchyard of the Church of the Holy Cross, Kilgwrrwg) It is thought that the cross was moved, in about 1870, from a possible prior location at map reference SO40390659 (N 51.754813, W 2.8649842). Mitchell recalls the local tradition regarding the moving of the cross: "a man living at The Broom moved it to his garden; from that moment he had no luck with anything; his animals died etc.; he attributed his misfortunes to having sacrilegiously taken possession of the cross, so carried it out of his garden and cast it down on a piece of waste ground".

== Sources ==
- Bradney, Joseph (1992). A History of Monmouthshire: The Hundred of Raglan, Volume 2 Part 1. Academy Books. ISBN 1-873361-15-7.
- Hando, Fred (1961). "Monmouthshire Sketchbook: No.452". South Wales Argus.
- Mitchell, Elizabeth Harcourt (1893). The Crosses of Monmouthshire. Caerleon and Monmouthshire Antiquarian Association. OCLC 1154836676.
