= Post Office Engineering Union =

Former trade union of the United Kingdom

POEU
- Post Office Engineering Union
- Merged into: National Communications Union
- Founded: 1915
- Dissolved: 1985
- Headquarters: Greystoke House, Brunswick Road, London
- Location: United Kingdom
- Members: 130,000 (1983)
- Publication: POEU Journal
- Affiliations: TUC, PTTI

The Post Office Engineering Union (POEU) was a trade union in the United Kingdom. It represented engineering staff in the Post Office, mostly working in telecommunications.

== History ==
The union was founded in 1915 when the Post Office Engineering and Stores Association and the Amalgamated Society of Telephone Employees merged, to form the Post Office Amalgamated Engineering and Stores Association. In 1922, following the establishment of the Irish Free State, the union's Irish section split away to form the Irish Post Office Engineering Union. In 1925, the Post Office Telegraph Mechanicians' Society joined the union. However, by 1939, membership was only 39,000.

By 1983, the POEU was the twentieth largest union in the UK, with membership around 130,000. In 1985, it merged with the Postal and Telecommunications Group of the Civil and Public Services Association, forming the National Communications Union.

== Election results ==
The union sponsored Labour Party candidates in each Parliamentary election from 1966 onwards.

| Election | Constituency | Candidate | Votes | Percentage | Position |
|---|---|---|---|---|---|
| 1966 general election | Isle of Ely | Graham Nurse | 19,566 | 43.8 | 2 |
| 1969 by-election | Newcastle-under-Lyme | John Golding | 21,786 | 46.1 | 1 |
| 1970 general election | Colchester | John Bartlett | 20,325 | 35.0 | 2 |
| 1970 general election | Mitcham | Reginald Vincent | 22,047 | 44.2 | 2 |
| 1970 general election | Newcastle-under-Lyme | John Golding | 22,329 | 48.9 | 1 |
| 1973 by-election | Westhoughton | Roger Stott | 26,294 | 57.0 | 1 |
| Feb 1974 general election | Edinburgh Pentlands | John McWilliam | 13,560 | 30.8 | 2 |
| Feb 1974 general election | Newcastle-under-Lyme | John Golding | 28,603 | 47.2 | 1 |
| Feb 1974 general election | Westhoughton | Roger Stott | 30,574 | 51.5 | 1 |
| Oct 1974 general election | Newcastle-under-Lyme | John Golding | 28,154 | 49.6 | 1 |
| Oct 1974 general election | Westhoughton | Roger Stott | 30,373 | 54.1 | 1 |
| 1979 general election | Bexleyheath | Richard Blackwell | 13,342 | 32.7 | 2 |
| 1979 general election | Blaydon | John McWilliam | 24,687 | 53.4 | 1 |
| 1979 general election | Newcastle-under-Lyme | John Golding | 28,649 | 48.5 | 1 |
| 1979 general election | Westhoughton | Roger Stott | 29,685 | 48.2 | 1 |
| 1983 general election | Blaydon | John McWilliam | 21,285 | 44.4 | 1 |
| 1983 general election | Newcastle-under-Lyme | John Golding | 21,210 | 42.0 | 1 |
| 1983 general election | Wigan | Roger Stott | 29,859 | 54.6 | 1 |

== Leadership ==
=== General Secretaries ===
1915: Charles Howard Smith
1938: John Edwards
1947: Douglas Coward
1953: Charles Delacourt-Smith
1972: Bryan Stanley

=== Presidents ===
1915: E. W. Bennett
1921: H. A. Barclay
1924: E. W. Goodwin
1926: H. G. Hill
1933: C. T. Saunders
1934: E. W. Goodwin
1935: C. J. Connelly
1936: A. V. Games
1939: Ernie Power
1951: W. J. A. Hughes
1952: L. G. Fox
1955: W. J. Jones
1956: Stan Rosser
1970: John Scott-Garner
