= Dennis Severs' House =

Museum in London, England

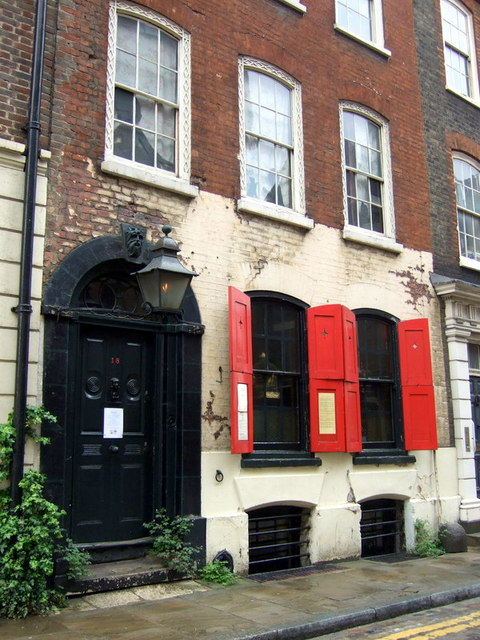
- Dennis Severs' House
- Location: 18 Folgate Street; London, United Kingdom
- Coordinates: 51°31′15″N 0°4′36″W
- Website: Dennis Severs' House

Dennis Severs' House is a historical tourist attraction at 18 Folgate Street in Spitalfields, within the East End of Central London, England. Created by Dennis Severs, who owned and lived in the house from 1979 to 1999, it is intended as a "historical imagination" of what life would have been like inside for a family of Huguenot silk weavers. It is a Grade II listed Georgian terraced house. From 1979 to 1999 it was lived in by Dennis Severs, who gradually recreated the rooms as a time capsule in the style of former centuries. Severs' friend Dan Cruickshank said: "It was never meant to be an accurate historical creation of a specific moment – it was an evocation of a world. It was essentially a theatre set."

In 2021, a large trove of audio tapes were found, and were condensed to create a new Dennis Severs' Tour, conducted by an actor. The house's Latin motto is Aut Visum Aut Non!: "You either see it or you don't."

== The house ==
The house is on the south side of Folgate Street and dates from approximately 1724. It is one of a terrace of houses (No.s 6–18) built of brown brick with red-brick dressings, over four storeys and with a basement. The listing for the house, compiled in 1950, describes No. 18 as having a painted facade, and with first-floor window frames enriched with a trellis pattern. By 1979 the house was very run-down; it was saved by the Spitalfields Historic Buildings Trust, an architectural preservation charity.

== History ==
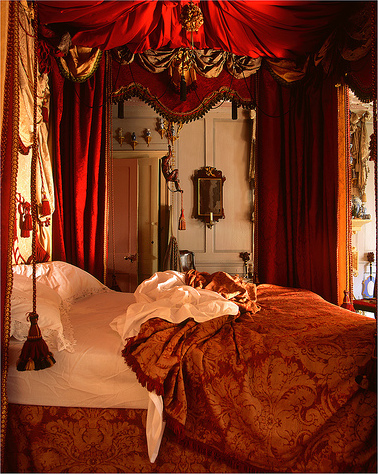
One of the bedrooms

Dennis Severs (16 November 1948, California, US – 27 December 1999, London) was drawn to London by what he called "English light", and bought the dilapidated property in Folgate Street from the Spitalfields Trust in 1979. This area of the East End of London, next to Spitalfields Market, had become very run-down, and artists had started to move in. Bohemian visual artists Gilbert & George added to the flavour of the neighbourhood; resident there since the late 1960s, they also refurbished a similar house. In addition, the historian and writer Raphael Samuel lived in the area. The group of people Severs was a part of, who began renovating houses in Spitalfields in the 1980s, is sometimes referred to as the Neo-Georgians.

Severs started on a programme to refurbish the ten rooms of his house, each in a different historic style, mainly from the 18th and 19th centuries. The rooms are arranged as if they are in use and the occupants have only just left. The rooms contain objects either of the period, or made by Severs. An authentic-looking 17th-century swag over a fireplace was made of varnished walnuts. A four-poster bed, that Severs slept in, was made of pallets and polystyrene. There are displays of items such as half-eaten bread, and different smells and background sounds for each room. The Victorian poverty and squalor room had smells described as disgusting, but real.

Woven through the house is the story of the fictional Jervis family (a name anglicised from Gervais), originally immigrant Huguenot silk weavers, who lived at the house from 1725 to 1919. Each room evokes incidental moments in the lives of these imaginary inhabitants. Peter Ackroyd, author of London: the biography, wrote:

The journey through the house becomes a journey through time; with its small rooms and hidden corridors, its whispered asides and sudden revelations, it resembles a pilgrimage through life itself.

Cultural studies researcher Hedvig Mårdh writes that Dennis Severs' House is "admittedly difficult to categorize" and that it combines scenography and artwork. The art form practised by Severs has been described as "a type of theatre unique and rare"; in Severs' obituary, Gavin Stamp defined the house as "a three-dimensional historical novel, written in brick and candlelight". Severs himself offered the term "still-life drama", which today is used in a number of notes that guide silent visitors around the house. He wrote, to describe his endeavour:

I worked inside out to create what turned out to be a collection of atmospheres: moods that harbour the light and the spirit of various ages.

Writer and illustrator Brian Selznick used the house as an inspiration for his 2015 novel The Marvels. The book concludes with a short history and photographs of Dennis Severs. Many of the characters' names and story lines are similar to what can be found in the museum.

The writer Jeanette Winterson, who also restored a derelict house nearby to live in, observed, "Fashions come and go, but there are permanencies, vulnerable but not forgotten, that Dennis sought to communicate". Painter David Hockney described the house as one of the world's greatest works of opera.

The house was bought by the Spitalfields Trust shortly before Severs, long HIV-positive, died of cancer two days after Christmas 1999. Severs wrote before his death "I have recently come to accept what I refused to accept for so long: that the house is only ephemeral. That no one can put a preservation order on atmosphere." Nonetheless, the house was preserved, and open to the public, who are asked during their visit to respect the intent of the creator and participate in an imaginary journey to another time.

== Television ==
Severs appeared as himself on an episode of Tell The Truth on Channel 4, dated 9 November 1984, discussing the house. Severs and the house also appeared in the 1985 BBC documentary Ours to Keep: Incomers.
