= Church of the Holy Cross, Kilgwrrwg =

- Church of the Holy Cross
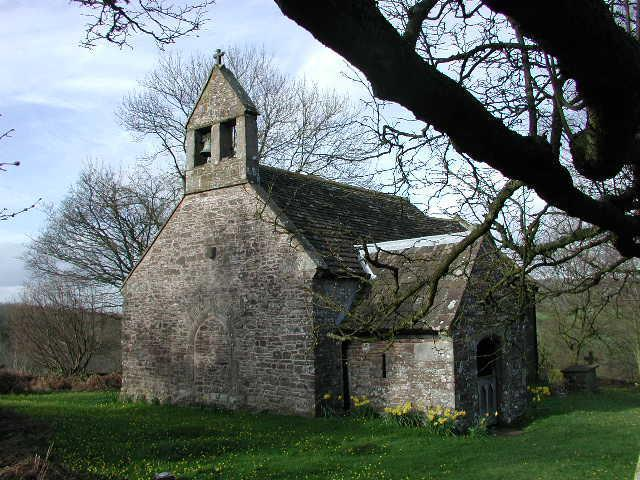
- "a medieval church from a now deserted village"

- Location in Monmouthshire
- 51.6822°N 2.7793°W
- Location: Kilgwrrwg, Monmouthshire
- Country: Wales
- Denomination: Church in Wales
- Website: Holy Cross, Kilgwrrwg

History
- Status: Parish church
- Founded: C13th century

Architecture
- Functional status: Active
- Heritage designation: Grade II*
- Designated: 19 August 1955
- Architectural type: Church
- Style: Early English/Decorated

Administration
- Diocese: Monmouth
- Archdeaconry: Monmouth
- Deanery: Netherwent
- Parish: Kilgwrrwg

Clergy
- Vicar: The Reverend M J Gollop

The Church of the Holy Cross, Kilgwrrwg, Monmouthshire, Wales, is an early medieval parish church that once served a now abandoned village. A Grade II* listed building, the church remains an active parish church and is part of the Severn Wye Ministry Area.

== History ==
The writer Clive Aslet, who describes the church as "the remotest (.) in Wales", recounts the legend of the founding of the church, on the spot where two yoked heifers rested. The circular churchyard suggests a Celtic, possibly pre-Christian, origin for the site. The present church is early medieval, Cadw suggesting a 13th-century date.

The existing features are from the 16th, 17th and 19th centuries. By the early 19th century, the church was described as little more than "a dilapidated sheepfold". A restoration took place in 1820, at the instigation, and mostly at the expense, of a local schoolmaster, James Davies. More extensive rebuilding was undertaken by John Prichard in 1871, and again in 1977-9 (Cadw) or 1989-90 (Newman). At the time of the 20th century reconstruction, the church was named Holy Cross, no earlier dedication being recorded.

== Architecture and description ==
The church is constructed of Old Red Sandstone, the style a mix of Early English and Decorated. It consists of a chancel, nave, porch and bellcote. The interior is simple, the chancel having a plain truss rather than an arch. The church is Grade II* listed, the listing noting it as an "attractive and little altered medieval church from a now deserted village".

The churchyard contains an early cross, which is both a Grade II listed structure and a Scheduled monument. It is the only complete churchyard cross remaining in Monmouthshire. (Note: The only other complete cross in Monmouthshire is the Cross at Croes Llwyd Farm.)

The church has one bell by the William Evans Foundry of Chepstow.
