= Douglas Coward =

British trade union leader

- Born: Douglas John Walker Coward; 30 June 1915; Islington, London, England
- Died: 14 December 1978 (aged 63); Surrey, England
- Education: Trinity College, Cambridge
- Occupation: Trade Union leader

Douglas John Walker Coward (30 June 1915 – 14 December 1978) was a British trade union leader, who briefly led the Post Office Engineering Union (POEU).

Coward attended Trinity College, Cambridge, and in 1945 was president of the Cambridge Union.

Coward joined the POEU in 1946 as its deputy general secretary, with a strong reputation as a negotiator with a focus on detail. The union's general secretary, John Edwards, had recently been elected to Parliament, and so Coward immediately began undertaking much of Edwards' role. In 1947, Edwards was appointed as a minister and went on leave, and in June, Coward was elected as general secretary of the union.

Coward's period running the union was difficult, struggling with the effects of a reorganisation of the Post Office in 1946, and with his approach criticised by members of the union who found him remote. He began working extremely long hours, and in April 1951, he collapsed at work. He went on leave until July, but his health did not recover, and in April 1952, he resigned, to take easier work.

Trade union offices
| Preceded by John Edwards | General Secretary of the Post Office Engineering Union; 1947–1952 | Succeeded by Charles Delacourt-Smith |
