= Margaret Delacourt-Smith, Baroness Delacourt-Smith of Alteryn =

British Labour politician

The Right Honourable The Baroness Delacourt-Smith of Alteryn JP

Member of the House of Lords
- Lord Temporal
- Life peerage 5 July 1974 – 8 June 2010

Personal details
- Born: 5 April 1916
- Died: 8 June 2010 (aged 94)

Margaret Rosalind Delacourt-Smith, Baroness Delacourt-Smith of Alteryn, Baroness Delacourt-Smith, JP (née Hando) (5 April 1916 – 8 June 2010) was a British Labour politician.

== Biography ==
Margaret Rosalind Hando was born in 1916. Her father, Fred Hando, was an artist, writer and headmaster. Margaret Hando married politician Charles Delacourt-Smith. The couple changed their surname of Smith to Delacourt-Smith by deed poll in 1967, the same year Delacourt-Smith entered the House of Lords.

She was created a life peer in her own right as Baroness Delacourt-Smith of Alteryn, of Alteryn in the County of Gwent on 5 July 1974.

She died on 8 June 2010, aged 94.
