= Servants: The True Story of Life Below Stairs =

BBC historical documentary

Servants: The True Story of Life Below Stairs is a BBC historical documentary, presented by professor Pamela Cox and produced by Emma Hindley and Annabel Hobley.

== Episodes ==
No.	Name	Presenter	Series Producer	Executive Producer
1	Knowing Your Place	Pamela Cox	Emma Hindley	Annabel Hobley
2	Class War	Pamela Cox	Emma Hindley	Annabel Hobley
3	No Going Back	Pamela Cox	Emma Hindley	Annabel Hobley
