= Allt-y-Bela =

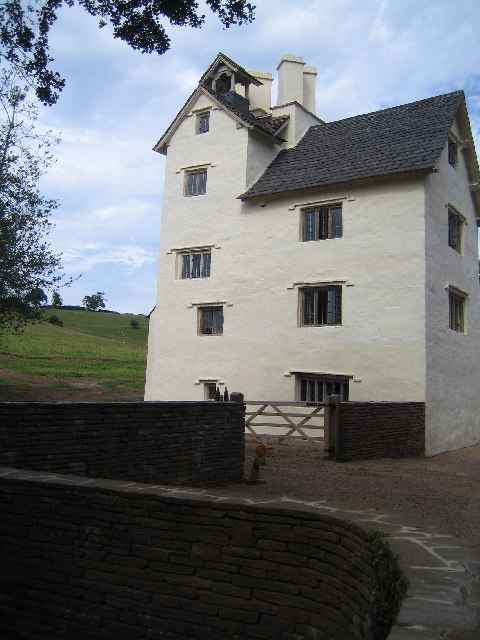
- "the dignity of Allt-y-Bela"

- Location within Monmouthshire
- 51.7004°N 2.8523°W
- Type: Country house
- Location: Llangwm, Monmouthshire, Wales
- OS grid reference: SO 4119 0053

History
- Built: late Medieval

Site notes
- Architectural style: vernacular

Listed Building – Grade II*
- Designated: 19 August 1955
- Reference no.: 2031

Allt-y-Bela in Llangwm, Monmouthshire, Wales, is a house of late medieval origin with additions from the sixteenth to the twenty-first centuries. The name means "wood/wooded slope of the wolf/marten" in Welsh. During the early seventeenth century, it was owned by Roger Edwards, a wealthy Midlands merchant and the founder of Usk Grammar School. Edwards made significant alterations in the Renaissance style to the medieval cruck house. By the twentieth century, the house was in ruins until restored by the Spitalfields Historic Buildings Trust in the early twenty-first century. Now owned by the garden designer Arne Maynard, the house is a Grade II* listed building recognising its significance as an "exceptionally important sub-medieval house with ambitious early renaissance additions".

== History and architecture ==
The house was built in the late-medieval period, the first datable reference being an "ovolo-moulded mullion window of 1599." This period also saw the construction of the three-storeyed parlour tower. This building was undertaken by Roger Edwards, a cloth merchant from the Midlands, who founded the grammar school at Usk. This phase of construction was investigated by Sir Cyril Fox and Lord Raglan in their multi-volume study Monmouthshire Houses. Fox and Raglan described the architectural style employed as Renaissance, identifying it as a significant development in Monmouthshire vernacular architecture. Peter Smith, in his study Houses of the Welsh Countryside, records their view that the construction of the parlour block at Allt-y-Bela "heralded the beginning of the Renaissance in th(e) county".

The Monmouthshire author and artist Fred Hando visited the house in the early 1950s and described it in his book Journeys in Gwent. Although, in 1951, the house was still habitable, Hando wrote presciently of its coming fate: "Here are ominous signs that unless immediate and drastic action is taken, we shall lose priceless relics." By the end of the twentieth century, the house was in a state of advanced decay with the parlour tower having almost completely collapsed. In 2000, the architectural writer John Newman described the house as "miserably derelict." Following compulsory purchase by Monmouthshire County Council, control of the building passed to the Spitalfields Historic Buildings Trust in 2001. After a large-scale restoration project, jointly funded by the Trust and by Cadw, the fully restored building was sold to the landscape designer Arne Maynard in 2006. It now operates as a bed and breakfast and can also be rented in its entirety.
