= Charles Delacourt-Smith, Baron Delacourt-Smith =

British politician

The Right Honourable The Lord Delacourt-Smith PC JP
- Delacourt-Smith in 1949

Minister of State for Technology
- In office 1969–1970 Serving with Anthony Wedgwood Benn
- Monarch: Elizabeth II
- Prime Minister: Harold Wilson
- Minister: Tony Benn

Member of Parliament for Colchester
- In office 26 July 1945 – 3 February 1950
- Preceded by: Oswald Lewis
- Succeeded by: Cuthbert Alport

Personal details
- Born: Charles George Percy Smith; 25 April 1917
- Died: 2 August 1972 (aged 55)
- Party: Labour
- Spouse: Margaret Hando
- Children: 1 son, 2 daughters
- Education: Wadham College, Oxford

Charles George Percy Delacourt-Smith, Baron Delacourt-Smith PC, JP (25 April 1917 – 2 August 1972), was a British trade unionist and Labour Party politician.

== Background and education ==
Born in Windsor and named after his father, he was the only son of Charles Smith and his wife Annie Ethel Florence Ralfe. He was educated at Windsor Grammar School and went then to Wadham College, Oxford, graduating with a Master of Arts At Oxford he was elected Librarian of the Oxford Union.

== Working life ==
After university, he became employed at the New Fabian Research Bureau as a research assistant. In 1939, he came to the Civil Service Clerical Association and was an assistant secretary until 1953. Subsequently, he joined the Post Office Engineering Union, serving as its general secretary 1967. In 1960, he was nominated a justice of the peace, assigned to the County of London.

== Political career ==
Following the outbreak of the Second World War, Delacourt-Smith entered the Royal Engineers in July 1940. He was commissioned in January 1943 and was transferred to the Royal Army Service Corps, where he was promoted to captain and was mentioned in despatches. After the end of the war Delacourt-Smith was admitted to the British House of Commons in 1945, having been elected for Colchester. He represented the constituency until 1950 and during this time was Parliamentary Private Secretary to Philip Noel-Baker in the latter's capacity as Secretary of State for Commonwealth Relations. In 1947, he was chosen as an executive member of Labour's Research Department, a position he held for the next four years.

Delacourt-Smith was created a life peer as Baron Delacourt-Smith, of New Windsor, in the Royal County of Berks in 1967 and thus was ennobled to a seat in the House of Lords. Two years later he was appointed Minister of State for Technology and on this occasion sworn of the Privy Council. In 1970, when the Conservative Party took office he was replaced as Minister.

== Personal life ==
In 1939, he married Margaret, the daughter of Frederick James Hando. They had one son and two daughters. Together with his wife and younger daughter, he assumed the additional surname Delacourt by a deed poll in 1967. He died, aged 55, at the Westminster Hospital, London in 1972, hours after suffering a stroke while making a speech in the House of Lords, being survived by his wife. Two years after his death she received a life peerage in her own right.

== Works ==
- Democratic Sweden (1938), Smith, G. and Cole, M. (eds), Routledge
- Britain's Food Supplies in Peace and War (1940), Smith, C., Routledge
- Modern Turkey (1940), Parker, J. and Smith, C., Routledge

== Notes ==
Parliament of the United Kingdom
Preceded by Oswald Lewis	Member of Parliament for Colchester; 1945–1950	Succeeded by Cuthbert Alport
Non-profit organization positions
Preceded by Douglas Coward	General Secretary of the Post Office Engineering Union; 1953–1972	Succeeded by Bryan Stanley
Preceded by Ron Smith	President of the Postal, Telegraph and Telephone International; 1967–1969	Succeeded by Joseph A. Beirne
Political offices
Preceded by Reg Prentice; Joseph Mallalieu	Minister of State for Technology; 1969–1970; With: Eric Varley	Succeeded by Sir John Eden; The Earl of Bessborough
