= St Joseph's Hospital, Newport =

St Joseph's Hospital, Newport, Wales, UK.
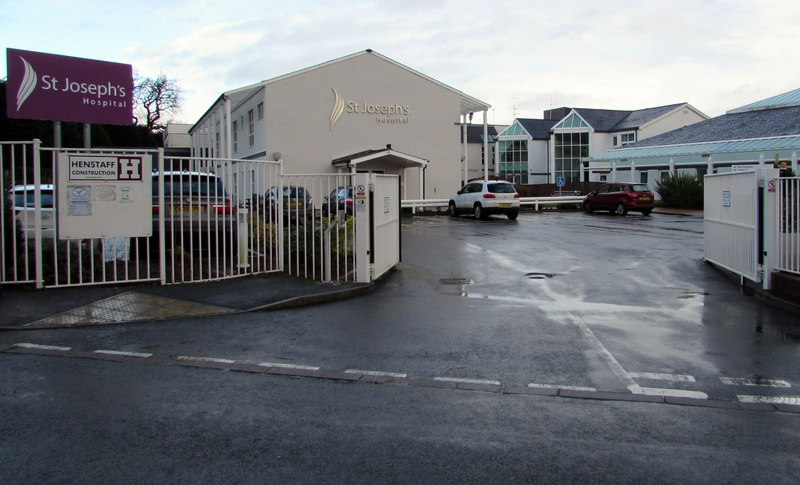
- Entrance to St Joseph's Hospital's Day Surgery

- Shown in Newport

Geography
- Location: Newport, Wales
- Coordinates: 51.6180°N 3.0051°W

Organisation
- Care system: Private
- Type: General

Services
- Emergency department: No

History
- Founded: 1946

Links
- Website: www.stjosephshospital.co.uk

St Joseph's Hospital is one of the largest privately owned hospitals in Wales. It is situated on Harding Avenue, Malpas, Newport.

== History ==
=== Origins ===
St Joseph's was founded by the Sisters of St Joseph of Annecy, a Roman Catholic religious congregation, in 1946. The three founding sisters, Sister Josephine, Sister Alphonse and Sister Malachy, had previously been sent to London to train as nurses. In 1944, the Sisters of St Joseph registered charity purchased Claremont House in Malpas and turned it into a convent. Two years later St Joseph's was officially granted the status of nursing home (a term for private hospitals coined by the government at the time), with the first surgical operation being performed in February 1946. The hospital had 16 beds and treated 314 patients in the first year.

=== New building ===
Patient numbers rose in the 1950s and the founding sisters decided to sell some of the land around Claremont House to pay for redevelopment. A new hospital building with 52 beds, built on the land alongside Claremont House, opened in 1961. Soon afterwards, a 12-bed maternity unit was added. The founding sisters enjoyed the support of senior figures in the Catholic Church, receiving visits from Cardinal Heenan and Archbishop Murphy of Cardiff in the 1960s, and a letter of encouragement from Pope Paul VI in 1977.

=== Friends of St Joseph's ===
In the 1980s, the charity Friends of St Joseph's was set up by volunteers to fundraise for new facilities. Various celebrities gave up their time to help raise money for the hospital, including actor Anthony Hopkins, singer David Essex and journalist Kate Adie. In 1996 St Anne's Hospice was opened on the same premises, and in 2004 the St Joseph's Physiotherapy and Hydrotherapy Centre was opened.

=== A consortium buys St Joseph's ===
By 2014, the 52-bed hospital had a turnover of £7.5 million a year and 130 staff, but the Sisters of St Joseph no longer had the resources to run or develop it. A spokesman said: "As a congregation, they no longer have the personnel, energy nor financial resources to continue indefinitely to govern, sustain and develop St Joseph's Hospital."

St Joseph's was bought for £2.78 million by a private consortium of investors and 36 of the hospital's existing consultants. The following year, the new owners announced a £10m investment. Permanent staff at the hospital increased to 177, supporting the work of the 160 consultants who treated patients at the hospital.

New diagnostic equipment, including fluoroscopes, CT and MRI scanners came online in 2015. The hospital's stated aim was to "have the most advanced diagnostic capability of any hospital in South Wales, both NHS and private".

== Current ownership ==
A private investor from the local area bought the hospital in February 2020, creating the entity St Joseph's Independent Hospital Ltd in the process. A £4m refurbishment was announced, along with plans to increase the hospital's permanent staff to 250.

In March 2021, Jess Fishlock MBE, Wales' most capped female footballer, opened the newly refurbished Hydrotherapy & Rehabilitation Centre, and in May 2021 St Joseph's opened a new day surgery unit with the capacity to treat 500 more patients per month.

St Joseph's celebrated 75 years of care in 2021.

The hospital is said to have the capacity to treat more than 50,000 people per year, as both in and outpatients.

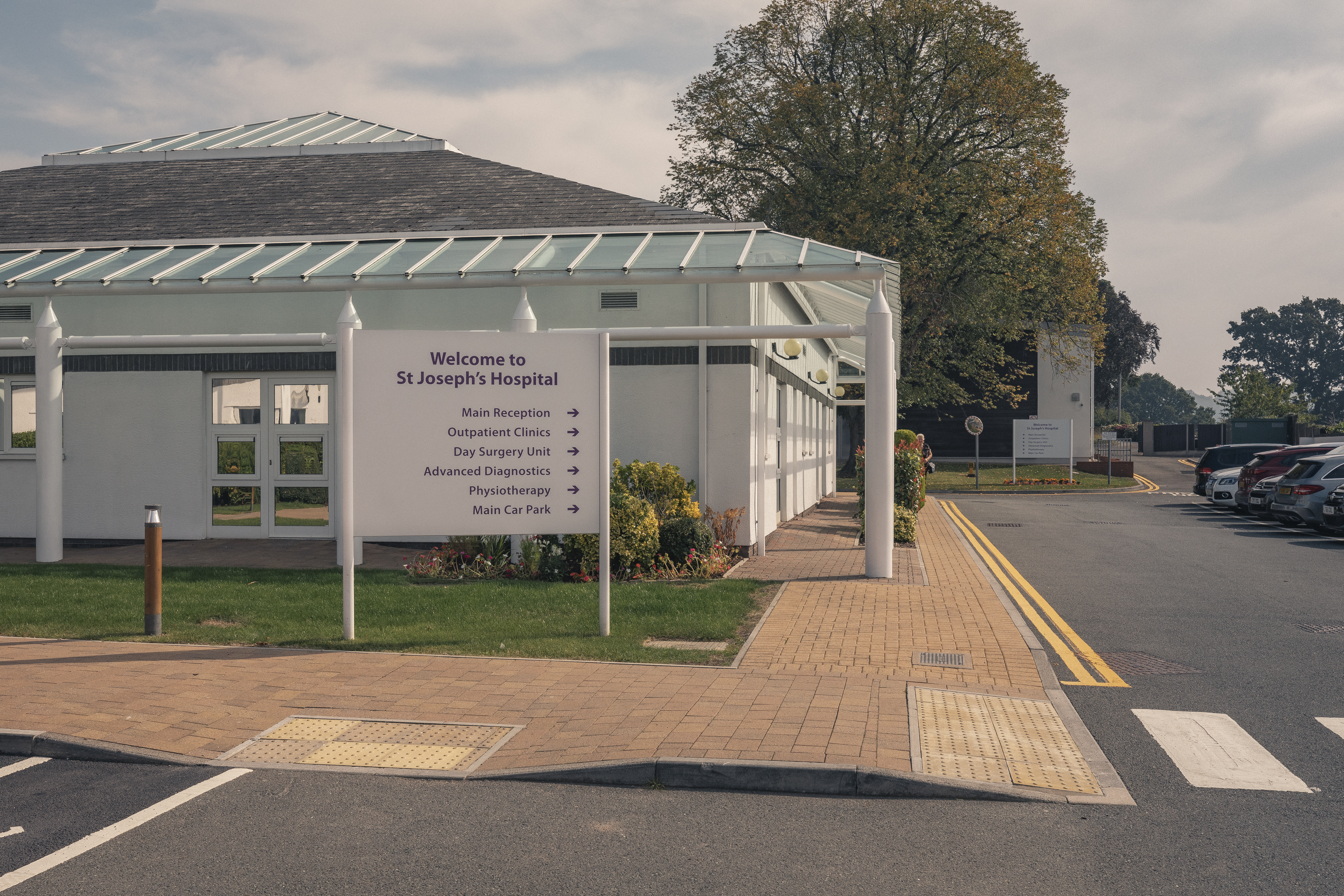
Orientational panel at St Joseph's Hospital

== Partnership with NHS ==
Since 2008, Cardiff and Vale University Health Board and Wye Valley NHS Trust have used St Joseph's Hospital to reduce waiting lists. NHS patients received orthopaedic surgery and attended a weekly podiatry surgery clinic. Since 2020, St Joseph's has expanded its NHS work, collaborating with the Aneurin Bevan University Health Board.

== 2020 Covid-19 pandemic ==
In 2020 St Joseph's entered into a formal partnership with NHS Wales as part of the national effort to combat the coronavirus pandemic. The hospital committed its entire staff, bed capacity, diagnostics, theatres and facilities to support the NHS through the public health crisis.
