= Edwardian Britain in Colour =

2019 historical documentary

Edwardian Britain in Colour is a 2019 historical documentary television series narrated by Sarah Lancashire, that colourises footage from Edwardian era Britain. It was first broadcast in the UK on Channel 5.

== Episodes ==
No.	Date aired
Episode 1	23 February 2019
Episode 2	2 March 2019
