= Free grammar school =

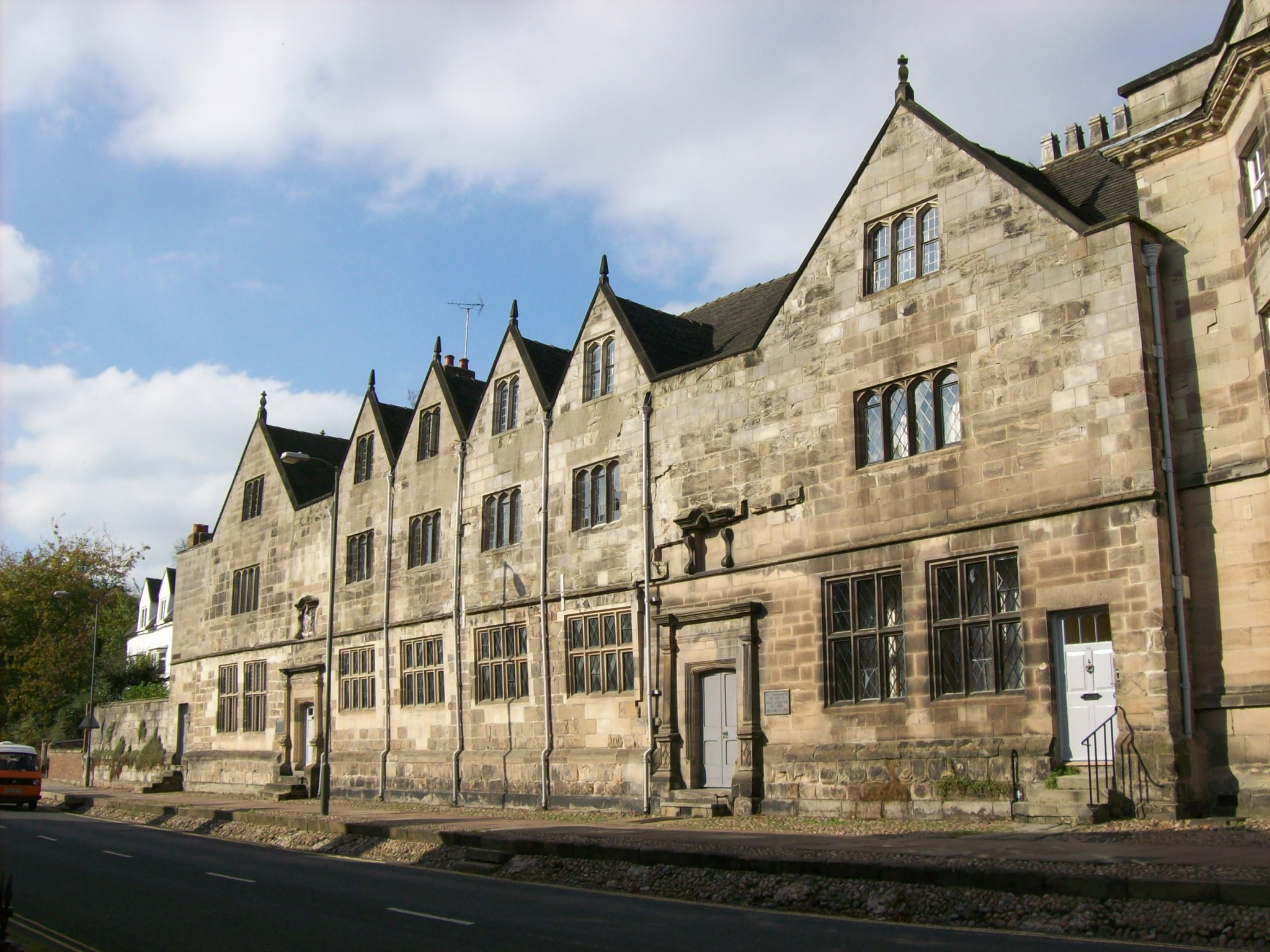
Ashbourne Free Grammar School

Free grammar schools were schools which usually operated under the jurisdiction of the church in pre-modern England. Education had long been associated with religious institutions since a cathedral grammar school was established at Canterbury under the authority of St Augustine's church and King Ethelbert at the end of the 6th century. The religious reforms of Henry VIII and the influence of renaissance philosophy resulted in an increased educational drive and a broadening of curriculum, but perhaps the most significant change of this period was that many new grammar schools were private institutions 'supervised in variable degree by church and state'. From the 16th century, there was much lively debate over curriculum, arguments about the original intentions of original benefactors and administrative detail. Due to the religious influence of free grammar school benefactors, these disputes or disciplinary concerns were often fought in church courts, and the consequent records offer rich detail of these concerns.
