= Spitalfields Historic Buildings Trust =

The Spitalfields Historic Buildings Trust, also known as the Spitalfields Trust, is a British architectural conservation charity. It originated in the Spitalfields area of London, although it also operates elsewhere in England and Wales. The trust's founders include the architectural historians Mark Girouard and Colin Amery and the art historian and television presenter Dan Cruickshank.

The Spitalfields Historic Buildings Trust was founded in 1977 to rescue the remaining Georgian houses in Spitalfields, London, which were threatened with demolition by the expansion of London's financial district. The trust's work was important in the preservation of the network of early 18th-century streets in the area. The trust is largely funded by grants from English Heritage and Cadw, and by loans from the Architectural Heritage Fund.

The trust's work has been criticised as leading to the gentrification of Spitalfields, changing a working-class area into "a gentrified enclave for writers, historians and the like", who are "all predominantly white European".

== List of buildings restored by the trust ==
Name	Location	Image	Date	Notes	Listed building grade
Allt-y-Bela	Llangwm Uchaf, Monmouthshire; 51.701°N 2.853°W	Tall white-painted house	Mid-15th century	Built as a hall house in the mid-15th century, originally a single-storey, cruck-frame building with wooden mullions and leaded lights. About a century later a first floor was added with dormer windows and chimneys. A three-storey Renaissance tower was added in 1599.	II*
Shurland Hall	Isle of Sheppey, Kent; 51.4079°N 0.8655°E	A brick building	c. 1532	A large Tudor gatehouse associated with King Henry VIII	II*
The Black House, Gillingham	Gillingham, Kent; 51.3837°N 0.5958°E		Mid-17th century	Farmhouse and worker's cottage,	II
Minor Canon Row	Rochester, Kent; 51.3883°N 0.5028°E	A row of brick-built terraced houses	1722–1735	A terrace of seven houses built between 1722 and 1735 to house the minor canons of the cathedral	I
Varden Street and Turner Street	Whitechapel, London; 51.51576°N 0.06055°W	A row of brick-built terraced houses	1809–1815	Two adjoining terraces of early-nineteenth century houses	
Naval officers' quarters	Sheerness Royal Dockyards, Kent; 51.4427°N 0.7537°E	A row of brick-built terraced houses	1820s–1830s	Ten houses including Dockyard House, built for the Chief Superintendent of the Royal Dockyard, and five houses forming Regency Terrace. Most were designed by George Ledwell-Taylor.	II* / II

== Other buildings with which the trust has been involved ==
- Malplaquet House, Stepney, London
- Dennis Severs' House, Spitalfields, London

== See also ==
- The Georgian Group
