= Union of Communication Workers =

Former trade union of the United Kingdom

- Merged into: Communication Workers' Union
- Founded: 1 January 1920
- Dissolved: 1995
- Headquarters: UCW House, Crescent Lane, Clapham
- Location: United Kingdom
- Members: 203,000 (1990)
- Publication: The Post
- Affiliations: TUC, Labour, PTTI

The Union of Communication Workers (UCW) was a trade union in the United Kingdom for workers in the post office and telecommunications industries.

== History ==
The union was founded in 1919 as the Union of Post Office Workers (UPW) by the merger of the Postmen's Federation, Postal and Telegraph Clerks' Association and the Fawcett Association. It achieved official recognition, and as a result, in 1920 the London Postal Porters' Association, Central London Postmen's Association, Tracers' Association, Tube Staff Association, Messengers' Association and Sorters' Association all merged with it. It was banned legally from TUC membership from 1927 to 1946. Its longest strike was for 7 weeks in 1971.

It changed its name in 1980, and merged with the National Communications Union in 1995 to form the Communication Workers' Union.

== Election results ==
The union sponsored Labour Party candidates in each Parliamentary election. From 1927 until the end of World War II, the union was legally barred from affiliating to the party, so its candidates in that period are omitted from many sources.

Election	Constituency	Candidate	Votes	Percentage	Position
1922 general election	Bury	Harry Wallace	9,643	36.7	2
1922 general election	Camberwell North	Charles Ammon	8,320	50.8	1
1922 general election	Carlisle	George Middleton	7,870	37.6	1
1922 general election	Harborough	Walter Baker	6,205	28.2	3
1922 general election	Newport (Monmouthshire)	John William Bowen	16,000	45.7	2
1922 general election	Stockton-on-Tees	Frederick Fox Riley	11,183	34.3	2
1923 general election	Bristol East	Walter Baker	14,824	53.7	1
1923 general election	Bury	Harry Wallace	9,568	36.1	2
1923 general election	Camberwell North	Charles Ammon	10,620	64.2	1
1923 general election	Carlisle	George Middleton	9,120	40.5	1
1923 general election	Newport	John William Bowen	14,100	38.6	2
1923 general election	Stockton-on-Tees	Frederick Fox Riley	10,619	31.2	3
1924 general election	Bristol East	Walter Baker	16,920	58.2	1
1924 general election	Bury	Harry Wallace	10,286	36.1	2
1924 general election	Camberwell North	Charles Ammon	11,300	54.9	1
1924 general election	Carlisle	George Middleton	10,676	45.5	2
1924 general election	Newport	John William Bowen	18,263	47.2	2
1924 general election	Stockton-on-Tees	Frederick Fox Riley	11,948	33.1	2
1929 general election	Bristol East	Walter Baker	24,197	65.8	1
1929 general election	Camberwell North	Charles Ammon	13,051	57.9	1
1929 general election	Carlisle	George Middleton	12,779	40.4	1
1929 general election	Crewe	John William Bowen	20,948	50.2	1
1929 general election	Stockton-on-Tees	Frederick Fox Riley	18,961	41.2	1
1929 general election	Walthamstow East	Harry Wallace	11,039	39.6	1
1931 general election	Camberwell North	Charles Ammon	9,869	48.1	2
1931 general election	Carlisle	George Middleton	13,445	42.7	2
1931 general election	Crewe	John William Bowen	18,351	42.2	2
1931 general election	Stockton-on-Tees	Frederick Fox Riley	18,168	38.4	2
1931 general election	Walthamstow East	Harry Wallace	9,983	31.2	2
1935 general election	Camberwell North	Charles Ammon	11,701	64.7	1
1935 general election	Crewe	John William Bowen	20,620	48.7	2
1935 general election	Walthamstow East	Harry Wallace	14,378	46.0	2
1945 general election	Clitheroe	Harry Randall	19,443	53.7	1
1945 general election	Heston and Isleworth	William Williams	29,192	54.3	1
1945 general election	Walthamstow East	Harry Wallace	15,650	51.1	1
1950 general election	Clitheroe	Harry Randall	18,359	43.8	2
1950 general election	Heston and Isleworth	William Williams	29,013	43.6	2
1950 general election	Walthamstow East	Harry Wallace	18,478	47.0	1
1951 general election	Droylsden	William Williams	26,829	51.8	1
1951 general election	Dumfriesshire	George Douglas	16,669	38.7	2
1951 general election	Mitcham	Harry Randall	28,187	45.3	2
1951 general election	Walthamstow East	Harry Wallace	19,036	47.5	1
1955 general election	Manchester Openshaw	William Williams	24,638	59.7	1
1955 general election	Walthamstow East	Harry Wallace	15,744	43.1	2
1955 by-election	Gateshead West	Harry Randall	13,196	66.5	1
1959 general election	Manchester Openshaw	William Williams	24,975	60.2	1
1959 general election	Gateshead West	Harry Randall	21,277	64.9	1
1963 by-election	Manchester Openshaw	Charles Morris	16,101	65.9	1
1964 general election	Bristol North East	Raymond Dobson	21,212	44.2	2
1964 general election	Gateshead West	Harry Randall	21,390	69.0	1
1964 general election	Manchester Openshaw	Charles Morris	22,589	59.6	1
1966 general election	Brighton Kemptown	Dennis Hobden	24,936	50.8	1
1966 general election	Bristol North East	Raymond Dobson	25,699	54.2	1
1966 general election	Gateshead West	Harry Randall	20,381	74.8	1
1966 general election	Manchester Openshaw	Charles Morris	22,103	64.9	1
1970 general election	Brighton Kemptown	Dennis Hobden	21,105	42.9	2
1970 general election	Bristol North East	Raymond Dobson	22,792	49.5	2
1970 general election	Manchester Openshaw	Charles Morris	19,397	60.2	1
1971 by-election	Stirling and Falkirk	Harry Ewing	17,536	46.5	1
Feb 1974 general election	Brighton Kemptown	Dennis Hobden	19,484	38.1	2
Feb 1974 general election	Hampstead	Tony Clarke	17,279	38.3	2
Feb 1974 general election	Manchester Openshaw	Charles Morris	16,478	53.5	1
Feb 1974 general election	Stirling, Falkirk and Grangemouth	Harry Ewing	21,685	41.9	1
Feb 1974 general election	Western Isles	Andrew Wilson	2,879	19.2	2
Oct 1974 general election	Brighton Kemptown	Dennis Hobden	19,060	40.3	2
Oct 1974 general election	Hampstead	Tony Clarke	16,414	40.6	2
Oct 1974 general election	Manchester Openshaw	Charles Morris	16,109	57.6	1
Oct 1974 general election	Stirling, Falkirk and Grangemouth	Harry Ewing	22,090	43.3	1
1979 general election	Manchester Openshaw	Charles Morris	17,099	62.1	1
1979 general election	Stirling, Falkirk and Grangemouth	Harry Ewing	29,499	56.5	1
1983 general election	Falkirk East	Harry Ewing	17,956	47.7	1
1987 general election	Falkirk East	Harry Ewing	21,379	54.2	1
1992 general election	Falkirk East	Michael Connarty	18,423	46.1	1

== Leadership ==
=== General Secretaries ===
1919: William Bowen
1936: T. J. Hodgson
1944: Charles Geddes
1956: Ron Smith
1967: Thomas Jackson
1982: Alan Tuffin
1992: Alan Johnson

=== Deputy General Secretaries ===
1919: Walter Baker
1931: James Paterson
1941: Charles Geddes
1944: G. A. Stevens
1951: Richard Hayward
1956: L. V. Andrews
1967: Norman Stagg
1980: Alan Tuffin
1982: Tony Clarke
1993: Derek Hodgson

=== Treasurers ===
1919: Will Lockyer
1935: W. T. Leicester
1947: A. H. Wood
1953: Ron Smith
1956: E. R. Mercer
1962: Fred Moss
1981: Fred Binks
1988: Derek Walsh

== See also ==
- Edgar Hardcastle
