= Dave Ward (trade unionist) =

British (born 1959)

General Secretary of the Workers Union
- Incumbent
- Assumed office 2015
- Preceded by: Billy Hayes

Personal details
- Born: 12 July 1959 (age 66) Lambeth, London, England

David (Dave) Ward CBE (born 12 July 1959) is a British trade union leader and General Secretary of the Communication Workers Union (CWU), which was formed through the merger of the Union of Communication Workers and the National Communications Union in 1995. The CWU is the largest trade union in the United Kingdom for people working in the postal and telecommunications industry with over 180,000 members. Ward is a co-chair of Stand Up To Racism.

== Trade union career ==
Born in Lambeth, London Ward joined the Post Office as a telegram boy in 1976 after leaving school and quickly became an active Union member. He became a member of the Tooting Branch Committee of the CWU in 1981. Ward was elected as Branch Secretary in 1982. Following the re-organisation of the Union's Branch structure in 1992 he was elected Branch Secretary of the London South West Branch. In 1995 he became London Regional Secretary and in 1996 was elected London Divisional Representative. He played a leading role in the 1996 National Postal Dispute, which involved eight days of 24-hour strikes over an extended period and eventually forced Royal Mail to drop their plans to introduce 'team working'.

In 2000, he was elected onto the Union's National Executive and in 2001 he became National Officer for the Outdoor Department (Deliveries and Collections). Dave was elected as the CWU Deputy General Secretary in June 2003, dealing with a major London dispute in 2003 and national disputes in 2007 and 2009. In 2015, he was elected as the union's General Secretary, defeating the incumbent, Billy Hayes.

Ward has participated in the 'Enough is Enough' campaign, fighting for workers' rights.

== Labour Party ==
Ward is a member of the Labour Party and served as the CWU's representative on the Labour Party's National Executive Committee but decided to step down from the role in 2007 because he believed it conflicted with the interests of the Union's members. Dave remains a critical member of the party particularly over the issues of the Post Office/Royal Mail privatisation and liberalisation.

In September 2015, Ward endorsed Jeremy Corbyn's campaign in the Labour Party leadership election. He said: "I am delighted to announce that the CWU will be backing Jeremy Corbyn MP to be the next leader of the Labour party. There are no quick fixes for the Labour Party, but there are some easy decisions, and choosing Jeremy as its leader should be one of them We think that it is time for a change for Labour. The grip of the Blairites and individuals like Peter Mandelson must now be loosened once and for all. There is a virus within the Labour party, and Jeremy Corbyn is the antidote."

In September 2016, Ward spoke at the Keep Corbyn rally in Brighton in support of Jeremy Corbyn's campaign in the Labour Party leadership election.

== Personal life ==
Ward is married with four children. His hobbies and interests include football and music. He is a Chelsea Football Club fan and likes a wide range of music and plays the blues guitar.

Trade union offices
Preceded by John Keggie	Deputy General Secretary of the Communication Workers Union; 2003–2015	Succeeded by Terry Pullinger
Preceded by Billy Hayes	General Secretary of the Communication Workers Union; 2015–present	Incumbent
