= 1986 Newcastle-under-Lyme by-election =

UK parliamentary by-election

- 17 July 1986

Constituency of Newcastle-under-Lyme
- Turnout: 62.2% (▼15.1%)
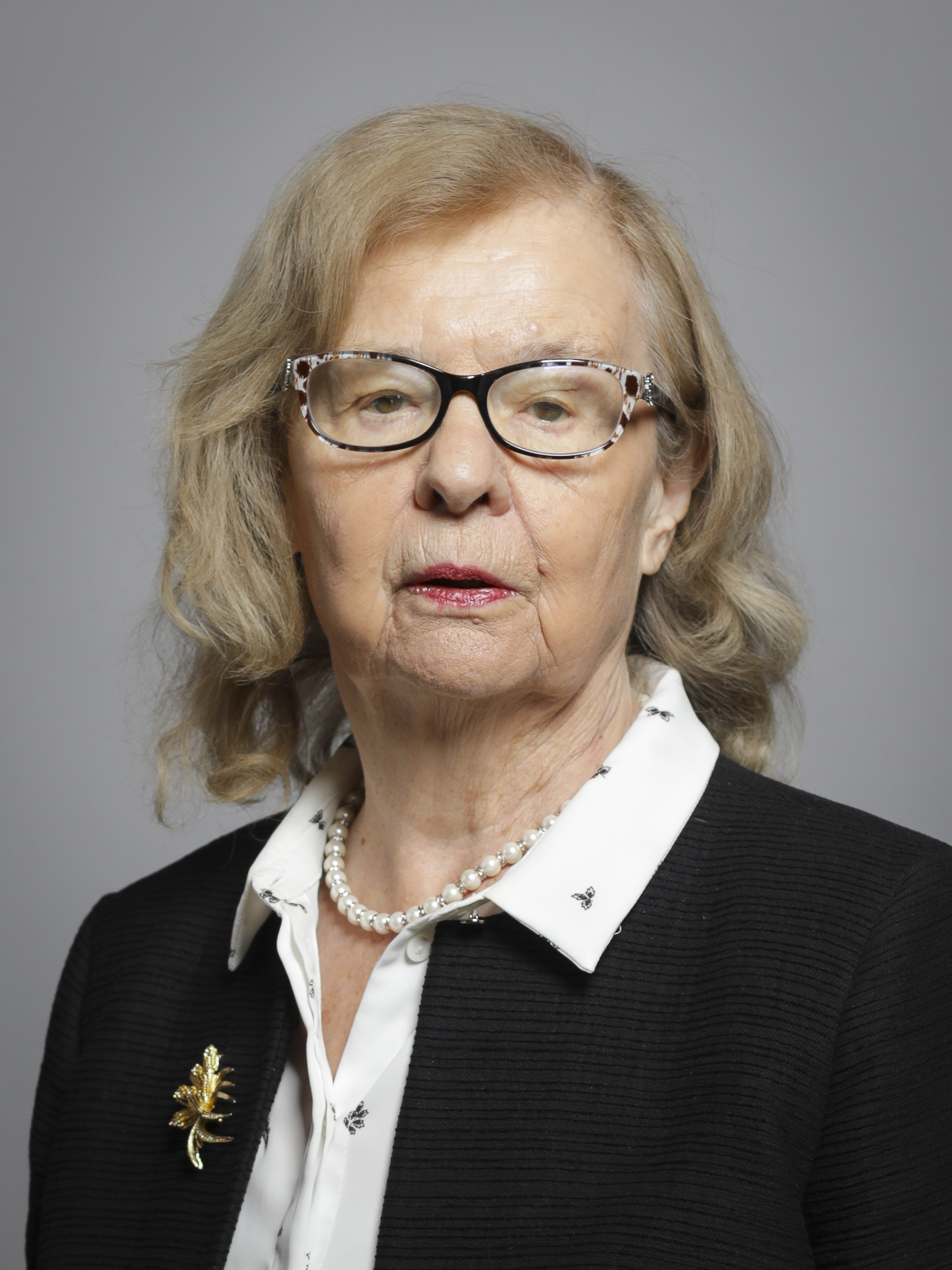
	First party	Second party	Third party
		Lib	Con
Candidate	Llin Golding	Alan Thomas	James Nock
Party	Labour	Liberal	Conservative
Popular vote	16,819	16,020	7,863
Percentage	40.8%	38.8%	19.0%
Swing	▼1.2%	▲17.2%	▼17.4%
MP before election
John Golding
Labour
Subsequent MP
Llin Golding
Labour

The 1986 Newcastle-under-Lyme by-election was a parliamentary by-election held on 17 July 1986 for the UK House of Commons constituency of Newcastle-under-Lyme.

== Previous MP ==
The seat had become vacant on 24 June 1986. The constituency's Labour Member of Parliament (MP), John Golding (9 March 1931 – 20 January 1999) resigned his seat to become a trade union leader. He did this by being appointed Steward of the Chiltern Hundreds, a notional office of profit under the Crown, which is used to permit MPs to vacate their seats.

John Golding had been an MP since the 1969 by-election in the seat. He was appointed as General Secretary of the National Communications Union in 1986 and retained that office until 1988.

== Candidates ==
Seven candidates were nominated. The list below is set out in descending order of the number of votes received at the by-election.

1. Representing the Labour Party was the former MPs wife, Llinos Golding (born 21 March 1933). She had worked as a radiographer for twelve years. She then became a member of the North Staffordshire Health Authority. Her father was the late Ness Edwards, who had been a Labour MP and Minister.

Mrs Golding was the Member of Parliament (MP) for Newcastle-under-Lyme from 1986 to 2001. After stepping down at the 2001 general election she was created a Life peer as Baroness Golding, of Newcastle-under-Lyme in the County of Staffordshire in the same year.

2. The Liberal Party candidate, representing the SDP–Liberal Alliance, was Alan Lindley Thomas. He was the Alliance group leader on both Newcastle-under-Lyme Borough Council and Staffordshire County Council. He was a lecturer in computing and was aged 46 at the time of the by-election. He had contested the seat of Stoke-on-Trent Central in the October 1974 and 1979 general elections, as well as the Newcastle-under-Lyme constituency in the 1983 general election.

3. The Conservative candidate was James Charles Barton Nock, a senior partner in a hotel development in Kent. Nock was aged 51 in 1986. He had been a member of Canterbury City Council since 1978 and was Leader of the Council at the time of the by-election.

5. David Edward Sutch (more commonly known as Screaming Lord Sutch) (10 November 1940 – 16 June 1999), was a pop singer and frequent participant in elections. He represented the Official Monster Raving Loony Party at this by-election. This was the twelfth parliamentary election Sutch had been a candidate at.

5. John Alan Gaskell was an independent, using the ballot paper label "Rainbow Alliance Prince Charles Appreciation Party".

6. James Parker was an independent candidate, using the ballot paper description "Referendum on Nuclear Energy".

7. David D'Arcy Brewester was another Independent candidate, using the ballot paper label "Rainbow Alliance Bob Geldof Appreciation Party".

== Result ==
1986 by-election: Newcastle-under-Lyme
Party	Candidate	Votes	%	±%
Labour	Llin Golding	16,819	40.8	−1.2
Liberal	Alan Thomas	16,020	38.8	+17.2
Conservative	James Nock	7,863	19.0	−17.4
Monster Raving Loony	David Sutch	277	0.7	New
Independent	John Gaskell	115	0.3	New
Independent	James Parker	83	0.2	New
Independent	David Brewester	70	0.2	New
Majority		799	2.0	−3.6
Turnout		41,247	62.2	−15.1
Labour hold		Swing		
Registered electors		66,353		

== See also ==
- Newcastle-under-Lyme constituency
- Lists of United Kingdom by-elections
- United Kingdom by-election records

== Sources ==
- Britain Votes/Europe Votes By-Election Supplement 1983-, compiled and edited by F.W.S. Craig (Parliamentary Research Services 1985)
