= Baron Clark =

Baron Clark may refer to:

- Kenneth Clark - English author, museum director, broadcaster, and art historian
- David Clark, Baron Clark of Windermere - British Labour politician and author
- William Clark, Baron Clark of Kempston
- Anthony Clarke, Baron Clarke of Hampstead
