= Derek Hodgson (trade unionist) =

Welsh trade union leader

Derek Hodgson (born 1941) is a former Welsh trade union leader.

Born in Cardiff, Hodgson attended St Mary's Catholic School. He left at the age of fifteen, and turned down a place at agricultural college for a job delivering telegrams for the Post Office. He joined the Union of Post Office Workers and became the union representative for the telegram boys. Part of his job involved delivering dispatch boxes to George Thomas, who encouraged Hodgson to join the Labour Party.

In his youth, Hodgson was a keen welterweight boxer, coached by Eddie Thomas. He considered turning professional, but he broke his leg in a motorbike accident at the age of nineteen and thereafter spent his spare time playing rugby and horse riding.

In 1963, Hodgson was elected as a full-time branch official, and in 1978 he was elected to its national executive. In 1987, he was elected to become national organiser, then became deputy general secretary in 1992. In 1993, he stood to become general secretary of the union, by then known as the Union of Communication Workers (UCW), but was defeated by Alan Johnson. Hodgson was also elected to the National Executive Committee of the Labour Party, and became a close ally of John Smith, meeting with him the night before Smith died.

The UCW became part of the Communication Workers' Union, and in 1998, Hodgson was elected to replace Johnson as its joint general secretary. He was highly critical of Johnson, stating that when he took over, "we had the worst record in industrial relations of any union and a bloody mess to sort out". He soon became sole general secretary, and prioritised a campaign against the privatisation of the Post Office. However, he was keen to avoid any suggestion of being a left-winger, claiming that he was "more of a [John] Prescott man".

Hodgson retired in 2001.

Since retiring Derek moved up North and now lives on the Lancashire coast with his wife Sheena, he is also a keen golfer.

Trade union offices
Preceded by Tony Clarke	Deputy General Secretary of the Union of Communication Workers; 1992–1997	Succeeded by Position abolished
Preceded by Alan Johnson and Tony Young	General Secretary of the Communication Workers' Union; 1997 – 2001; With: Tony Young (1997 – 1998)	Succeeded by Billy Hayes
