= John Golding (British politician) =

British politician and trade unionist (1931–1999)

Parliamentary Under-Secretary of State (Department of Employment)
- In office 8 March 1974 – 4 May 1979
- Leader: James Callaghan

Lord Commissioner
- In office 8 March 1974 – 18 October 1974

Member of Parliament for Newcastle-under-Lyme
- In office 30 October 1969 – 24 June 1986
- Preceded by: Stephen Swingler
- Succeeded by: Llin Golding

Personal details
- Born: 9 March 1931
- Died: 20 January 1999 (Aged 68)
- Party: Labour

John Golding (9 March 1931 – 20 January 1999) was a Labour Party politician and trade union leader in the United Kingdom.

== Biography ==
He was educated at Chester City Grammar School, Keele University and the London School of Economics. After some time working in the Civil Service he took up a research job with the Post Office Engineering Union.

Golding was elected Member of Parliament (MP) for Newcastle-under-Lyme at a by-election in 1969. He served in the governments of Harold Wilson and James Callaghan, as PPS to Eric Varley as Minister of Technology, a Labour whip in opposition, and Minister for Employment. He was an outspoken opponent of Labour left-wingers such as Tony Benn and Eric Heffer, whom he regarded as idle dreamers out of touch with the working-class.

Golding was a key figure in opposing the entryist Militant tendency, and especially in mobilising moderate trade union leaders to exercise their block votes to achieve this end. After he died, his writings were published under the title Hammer of the Left: My Part in Defeating the Labour Left, by John Golding and Paul Farrelly (see below).

In 1986, he left Parliament (by applying for the Chiltern Hundreds) to take up the post of General Secretary of the National Communications Union. He held this post until 1988. He had served as a member of the council of the Trades Union Congress.

After he vacated the Newcastle-under-Lyme seat, the resulting by-election was won by his wife Llin, who held the seat until retiring in 2001; her successor in the seat was Paul Farrelly.

John Golding's most unusual claim to fame is that he once made a speech in committee lasting eleven hours and fifteen minutes. It nominally concerned a small amendment to the bill to privatise British Telecom. This filibuster was instrumental in delaying the privatisation until after the 1983 general election, but with Margaret Thatcher's Conservatives obtaining a massive parliamentary majority, the privatisation was soon forced through. Changes in British parliamentary procedure mean that Golding's record is unlikely ever to be beaten.

Golding is also credited with having found a way to introduce the now typical unpredictability of Prime Minister Questions. In 1975, he decided to ask the broader possible question about what the Prime Minister had on the agenda for the day so that he could then use his right to follow up to ask the PM anything he wanted, dodging the strict vetting system on the questions in use until then.

Parliament of the United Kingdom
Preceded by Stephen Swingler	Member of Parliament for Newcastle-under-Lyme; 1969–1986	Succeeded by Llin Golding
Trade union offices
Preceded by Bryan Stanley	General Secretary of the National Communications Union; 1986 – 1988	Succeeded by Anthony Young
