= Billy Hayes (trade unionist) =

British politician (born 1953)

Leader of the Communication Workers' Union
- In office 2001–2015
- Preceded by: Derek Hodgson
- Succeeded by: Dave Ward

Personal details
- Born: 8 June 1953 (age 73) Netherfield, Liverpool
- Spouse: Dian Lee (m. 1995)
- Children: 2

William Hayes (born 8 June 1953) is a British politician who served as leader of the Communication Workers' Union in the United Kingdom.

== Early life ==
Born in Netherfield Liverpool, he attended St Swithin's Secondary Modern School on Croxteth Hall Lane (closed 1983). He later gained a Diploma in Trade Union Studies from the University of Liverpool. Hayes worked as a welder from 1968 to 1971, then for John West Foods from 1971 to 1973, hitch hiking in Europe for four months in 1973, and a few months on the dole before becoming a postman in 1974.

== Communication Workers Union ==
He became active in the Communication Workers Union, and in 1992 was elected to its National Executive Committee, then four months later elected to National Officer the Assistant Secretary of the Outdoor Department. He was elected General Secretary of the union in 2001. As General Secretary for the Communication Workers Union, he was one of the Awkward Squad, seen as troublesome to New Labour. Although involved in numerous disputes, both industrial and political, he was popular with Government because of continued support for Labour and his genial style. During his time in office membership of the union has fallen due to redundancies and an ageing workforce within British Telecoms and postal service Royal Mail. In 2015, he was beaten for re-election by his own deputy, Dave Ward.

== UNI post and logistics ==
He was 2010 to 2015 World President of UNI Post and Logistics – a sector of UNI Global Union. With more than 2.5 million members worldwide the Post and Logistics Sector is one of UNI's largest.

== Election to Conference Arrangements Committee ==
In September 2017, he and Seema Chandwani were elected to the Labour Conference Arrangements Committee.

== Political candidacy ==
In the 2018 Merton London Borough Council election, Hayes was a Labour candidate in Trinity ward.

== Personal life ==
In September 1995, he married Dian Lee in Knowsley. They have a son, Niall, and a daughter, Melissa.

== See also ==
- Dave Ward

Trade union offices
| Preceded by Derek Hodgson | General Secretary of the Communication Workers' Union; 2001–2015 | Succeeded by Dave Ward |
