= Manchester Openshaw =

Parliamentary constituency in the United Kingdom, 1955–1983

- Former borough constituency for the House of Commons
- Manchester Openshaw in Lancashire, showing boundaries used from 1974-1983

1955–1983
- Seats: one
- Created from: Manchester Gorton and Droylsden
- Replaced by: Manchester Central and Oldham West

Manchester Openshaw was a parliamentary constituency centred on the Openshaw district of Manchester. It returned one Member of Parliament (MP) to the House of Commons of the Parliament of the United Kingdom.

The constituency was created for the 1955 general election, and abolished for the 1983 general election.

== Boundaries ==
1955–1974: The county borough of Manchester wards of Bradford, Newton Heath and Openshaw, and the urban district of Failsworth.

1974–1983: The county borough of Manchester wards of Bradford and Newton Heath, and the urban district of Failsworth.

== Members of Parliament ==
Election	Member	Party
1955	William Williams	Labour
1963 by-election	Charles Morris	Labour
1983	constituency abolished	

== Election results ==
=== Elections in the 1950s ===
General election 1955: Manchester Openshaw
Party	Candidate	Votes	%	±%
Labour	William Williams	24,638	59.7	
Conservative	Harold Day	16,596	40.3	
Majority		8,042	19.4	
Turnout		41,234	72.7	
Labour win (new seat)				

General election 1959: Manchester Openshaw
Party	Candidate	Votes	%	±%
Labour	William Williams	24,975	60.2	+0.5
Conservative	Michael Schofield	16,537	39.8	−0.5
Majority		8,438	20.4	+1.0
Turnout		41,512	76.0	+3.3
Labour hold		Swing		

=== Elections in the 1960s ===
1963 Manchester Openshaw by-election
Party	Candidate	Votes	%	±%
Labour	Charles Morris	16,101	65.9	+5.7
Conservative	Gerald Fitzsimmons	7,139	29.2	−10.6
Communist	Eddie Marsden	1,185	4.9	New
Majority		8,962	36.7	+16.3
Turnout		24,425		
Labour hold		Swing		

General election 1964: Manchester Openshaw
Party	Candidate	Votes	%	±%
Labour	Charles Morris	22,589	59.6	−0.6
Conservative	Gerald Fitzsimmons	13,387	35.3	−4.5
Communist	Eddie Marsden	1,947	5.1	New
Majority		9,202	24.3	+3.9
Turnout		37,923	71.3	−4.7
Labour hold		Swing		

General election 1966: Manchester Openshaw
Party	Candidate	Votes	%	±%
Labour	Charles Morris	22,103	64.9	+5.3
Conservative	Robert Chronnell	10,465	30.7	−4.6
Communist	Eddie Marsden	1,479	4.3	−0.8
Majority		11,638	34.2	+9.9
Turnout		34,047	65.9	−5.4
Labour hold		Swing		

=== Elections in the 1970s ===
General election 1970: Manchester Openshaw
Party	Candidate	Votes	%	±%
Labour	Charles Morris	19,397	60.2	−4.7
Conservative	BM Allanson	12,296	38.1	+7.4
Communist	Bernard Panter	552	1.7	−2.6
Majority		7,101	22.1	−12.1
Turnout		32,245	63.9	−2.0
Labour hold		Swing		

General election February 1974: Manchester Openshaw
Party	Candidate	Votes	%	±%
Labour	Charles Morris	16,478	53.5	−6.7
Conservative	Aubrey Rosen	9,021	29.3	−8.8
Liberal	Arthur Wood	4,467	14.5	New
National Front	John Hulse	541	1.8	New
Communist	Phillip Widdall	312	1.0	−0.7
Majority		7,457	24.2	+2.1
Turnout		30,819	73.0	+9.1
Labour hold		Swing		

General election October 1974: Manchester Openshaw
Party	Candidate	Votes	%	±%
Labour	Charles Morris	16,109	57.6	+4.1
Conservative	Geoffrey Green	7,596	27.1	−2.2
Liberal	Arthur Wood	3,980	14.2	−0.3
Communist	Phillip Widdall	300	1.1	+0.1
Majority		8,513	30.4	+6.2
Turnout		27,985	65.7	−7.3
Labour hold		Swing	+3.1	

General election 1979: Manchester Openshaw
Party	Candidate	Votes	%	±%
Labour	Charles Morris	17,099	62.1	+4.5
Conservative	Peter Hilton	9,955	36.2	+9.1
National Front	Alfred Coles	296	1.1	New
Communist	Phillip Widdall	174	0.6	−0.5
Majority		7,144	26.0	−4.4
Turnout		27,524	72.8	+7.1
Labour hold		Swing		
