= Ron Smith (trade unionist) =

British trade unionist

Ron Smith CBE (15 July 1915 – 20 October 1999) was a British trade unionist.

Born in North London, Smith studied with the Workers' Educational Association, following his father into a job delivering mail, and also becoming active in the Labour Party and the Union of Post Office Workers. He became a full-time official in 1951, and in 1956 was elected as General Secretary of the union, also being elected to the General Council of the Trades Union Congress.

Smith joined the National Economic Development Council and was a part-time director of the British Overseas Airways Corporation. He stood down from his trade union post in 1966, to become Director of Labour Relations at the British Steel Corporation, in which role he frequently came into conflict with the steel workers' trade unions.

In his spare time, Smith collected beer mats and wine bottle labels from around the world.

Trade union offices
Preceded by A. H. Wood	Treasurer of the Union of Post Office Workers; 1953–1956	Succeeded by E. R. Mercer
Preceded by Charles Geddes	General Secretary of the Union of Post Office Workers; 1956–1966	Succeeded by Thomas Jackson
Preceded by Carl Stenger	President of the Postal, Telegraph and Telephone International; 1966–1967	Succeeded by Charles Delacourt-Smith
