= Llin Golding, Baroness Golding =

British politician (born 1933)

The Right Honourable The Baroness Golding
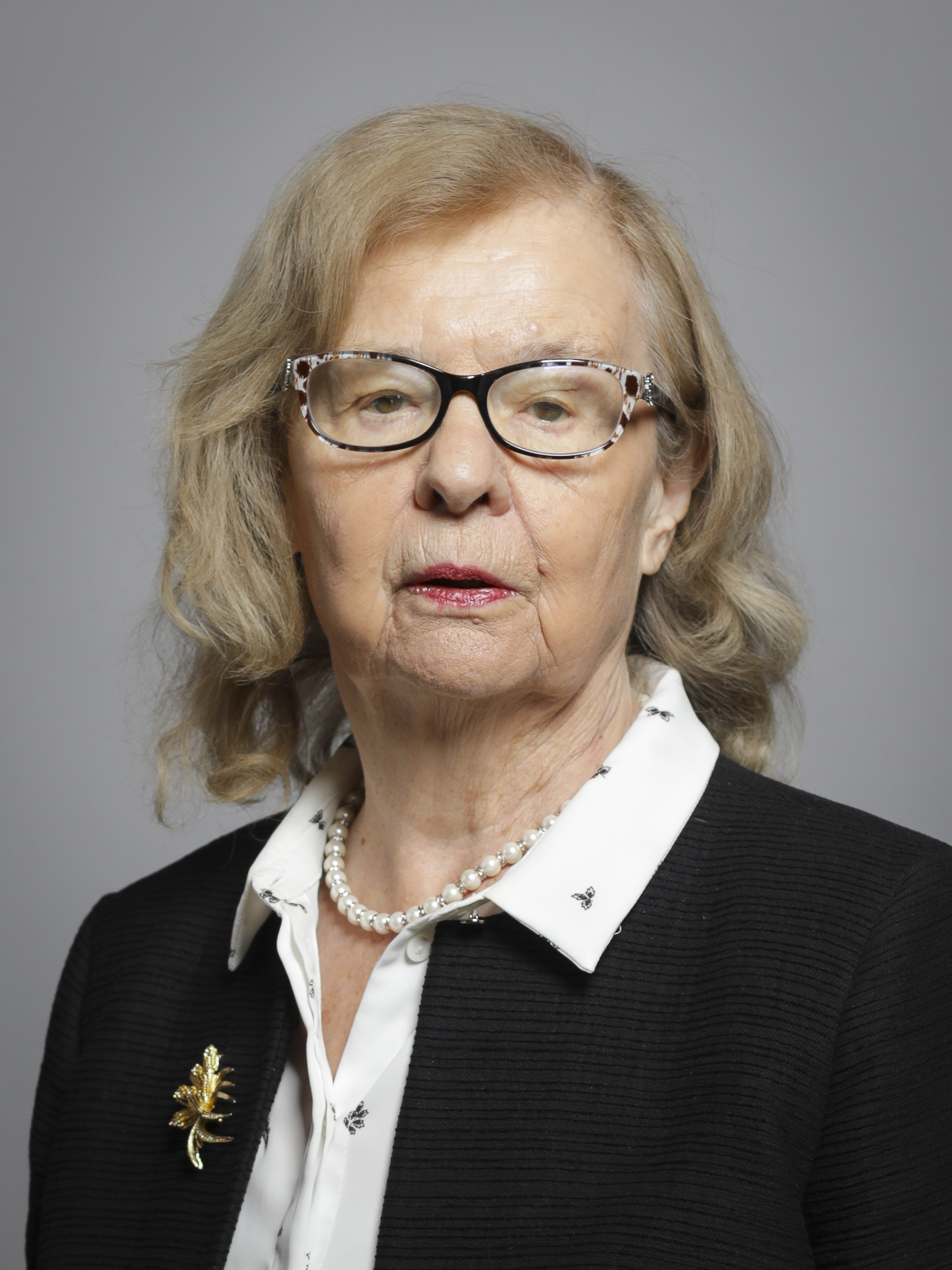

Member of Parliament for Newcastle-under-Lyme
- In office 17 July 1986 – 14 May 2001
- Preceded by: John Golding
- Succeeded by: Paul Farrelly

Member of the House of Lords
- Lord Temporal
- Life peerage 13 July 2001

Personal details
- Born: 21 March 1933 (age 93)
- Party: Labour

Llinos Golding, Baroness Golding (born 21 March 1933) is a Labour Party politician in the United Kingdom who currently sits in the House of Lords. She qualified as a radiographer and worked in the National Health Service, and is currently the patron of the Society of Radiographers.

The daughter of MP Ness Edwards, Golding was the Member of Parliament for Newcastle-under-Lyme from 1986 to 2001, having replaced her husband John Golding. After stepping down at the 2001 general election, she was created a life peer as Baroness Golding, of Newcastle-under-Lyme in the County of Staffordshire in the same year.

Baroness Golding was the peer who vouched for the two 'Fathers for Justice' protesters who threw a flour bomb at Prime Minister Tony Blair during Prime Minister's Questions on 19 May 2004. By vouching for them, Golding made it possible for the pair to access an area of the Commons viewing gallery not behind a glass security screen. There is no suggestion that she had any idea of their protest plans. Later the same afternoon, she apologised to the Houses of Lords and Commons for her part in the affair.

She is a board member of the Countryside Alliance, a pro-hunting organisation.

She is chairman of The Second Chance Children's Charity (Charity Commission Registration No 1001462).

== Bibliography ==
- Leigh Rayment's Peerage Pages
- Leigh Rayment's Historical List of MPs

Parliament of the United Kingdom
Preceded by John Golding	Member of Parliament for Newcastle-under-Lyme; 1986–2001	Succeeded by Paul Farrelly
