= Stephen Swingler =

British politician

The Right Honourable Stephen Swingler

Minister of State for Social Services
- In office November 1968 – 19 February 1969
- Prime Minister: Harold Wilson
- Preceded by: Office created
- Succeeded by: David Ennals

Member of Parliament for Newcastle-under-Lyme
- In office 25 October 1951 – 19 February 1969
- Preceded by: John Mack
- Succeeded by: John Golding

Member of Parliament for Stafford
- In office 5 July 1945 – 3 February 1950
- Preceded by: Peter Thorneycroft
- Succeeded by: Seat abolished

Personal details
- Born: Stephen Thomas Swingler; 2 March 1915
- Died: 19 February 1969 (aged 53) London, England
- Party: Labour
- Spouse: Anne Matthews (m. 1936)
- Children: 4
- Education: Stowe School
- Alma mater: New College, Oxford (BA)

Military service
- Branch/service: British Army
- Years of service: 1941–1945
- Rank: Captain
- Unit: Royal Armoured Corps
- Battles/wars: World War II

Stephen Thomas Swingler, PC (2 March 1915 – 19 February 1969) was a British Labour Party politician who was a Member of Parliament (MP) from 1945 to 1950, and from 1951 to his death.

== Early life ==
Swingler was the son of Rev. H. Swingler, and was educated at Stowe and New College, Oxford, where he took a B.A. in Philosophy, politics and economics (1936). Before entering politics he was a lecturer in adult education for the Workers' Educational Association. He served as a Captain in the Royal Armoured Corps from 1941 to 1945. Under the name 'Thomas Stevens', he wrote books including Outline of Political Thought since the French Revolution (1939) and Army Education (1941).

== Political career ==
In the Labour landslide at the 1945 general election, he was elected as MP for the previously Conservative-held seat of Stafford. When the constituency was abolished at the 1950 general election, he contested the new Stafford and Stone seat, but was defeated by Hugh Fraser. Following his defeat, he wrote for the New Statesman and Tribune. He shortly thereafter returned to parliament: in the 1951 general election, he was elected MP for Newcastle-under-Lyme, and held the seat until his death. Swingler was considered to be on the left of the party; he was the inaugural chair of a left-wing group called Victory for Socialism at its formation in 1958, and closely associated with it until its dissolution in 1964.

In Harold Wilson's 1964–1970 government, Swingler was Parliamentary Secretary to the Minister of Transport from 1964 to 1967. He was then promoted to Minister of State at the same department until November 1968, when he was moved to the new Department of Health and Social Security to become Minister of State for Social Services, and appointed as a Privy Councillor.

== John Bodkin Adams case ==
Swingler played a minor but interesting part in the John Bodkin Adams affair. On 8 November 1956, the Attorney-General Reginald Manningham-Buller handed the Scotland Yard report into Adams' activities to Dr McRae, Secretary of the British Medical Association (BMA), effectively the doctors' trade union in Britain. The prosecution's most valuable document was then copied and passed to Adams' defence counsel.

After a tip-off from a Daily Mail journalist, on 28 November Swingler (in conjunction with MP Hugh Delargy) addressed a question to the Attorney-General to be answered in the House of Commons on 3 December regarding Manningham-Buller's recent contacts with the General Medical Council. Manningham-Buller was absent on the day in question but gave a written reply stating he had "had no communications with the General Medical Council within the last six months." He avoided referring to the BMA directly (despite it being named in Delargy's question) and therefore avoided lying, though it could be argued, deliberately misled the House.

Adams was eventually acquitted of the murder of Edith Alice Morrell but was suspected by Home Office pathologist Francis Camps of killing 163 patients.

== Personal life ==
Swingler was married in 1936 to Anne Matthews, daughter of John Matthews, of Mitcham, formerly of Newcastle upon Tyne. They had four children: Robin, Nicholas, Clare and Oliver. Anne Swingler worked in the Labour Research Department, and later volunteered for Shelter Housing Aid.

Swingler had a heart attack on 13 February 1969, and died at a hospital in London six days later, on 19 February, aged 53.

Parliament of the United Kingdom
Preceded by Peter Thorneycroft	Member of Parliament for Stafford; 1945–1950	Constituency abolished
Preceded by John Mack	Member of Parliament for Newcastle-under-Lyme; 1951–1969	Succeeded by John Golding
Political offices
New creation	Minister of State for Social Services; 1968–1969	Succeeded by David Ennals
