= Alan Tuffin =

British trade union leader

Alan Tuffin CBE (2 August 1933 – 10 November 2017) was a British trade union leader.

Tuffin attended Eltham Secondary School, leaving at age 16 to work for the Post Office. He became active in the Union of Communication Workers, as its London Union Regional Official in 1957, then taking a full-time post as National Official in 1969, and becoming Deputy General Secretary ten years later. In 1982, he was elected as General Secretary of the union. He and his wife, Jean Elizabeth, married in 1957; and had one son and one daughter.

From 1982 until his retirement in 1993, Tuffin served on the General Council of the Trades Union Congress (TUC), winning election as President of the TUC (1992–93). In 1993, he was made a Commander of the Order of the British Empire (CBE). In retirement, he served on the Employment Appeal Tribunal, and as a director of Remploy.

Trade union offices
Preceded by Norman Stagg	Deputy General Secretary of the Union of Communication Workers; 1980–1982	Succeeded by Tony Clarke
Preceded by Thomas Jackson	General Secretary of the Union of Communication Workers; 1982–1993	Succeeded by Alan Johnson
Preceded by Rodney Bickerstaffe	President of the Trades Union Congress; 1992/3	Succeeded by Jimmy Knapp
