= Charles Morris (British politician) =

British politician

Charles Morris PC

Minister of State for the Civil Service Department
- In office 18 October 1974 – 4 May 1979
- Prime Minister: Harold Wilson; James Callaghan
- Preceded by: Robert Sheldon
- Succeeded by: Paul Channon

Minister of State for Urban Affairs
- In office 7 March 1974 – 18 October 1974
- Prime Minister: Harold Wilson
- Preceded by: Office established
- Succeeded by: Office abolished

Deputy Chief Whip of the House of Commons Treasurer of the Household
- In office 13 October 1969 – 18 June 1970
- Prime Minister: Harold Wilson
- Preceded by: Charles Grey
- Succeeded by: Humphrey Atkins

Vice-Chamberlain of the Household
- In office 29 July 1967 – 13 October 1969
- Prime Minister: Harold Wilson
- Preceded by: Jack McCann
- Succeeded by: Alan Fitch

Member of Parliament for Manchester Openshaw
- In office 5 December 1963 – 9 June 1983
- Preceded by: William Williams
- Succeeded by: Constituency abolished

Personal details
- Born: Charles Richard Morris; 14 December 1926 Ancoats, Manchester, England
- Died: 8 January 2012 (aged 85) Manchester, England
- Party: Labour (from 1943)
- Spouse: Pauline Dunn (m. 1950)
- Children: 2, including Estelle
- Relatives: Alf Morris (brother)

Charles Richard Morris PC (14 December 1926 – 8 January 2012) was a British politician who served as Member of Parliament (MP) for Manchester Openshaw from 1963 to 1983. A member of the Labour Party, he served as a Minister of State from 1974 to 1979 and a Government Whip from 1966 to 1970.

== Early life and career ==
Charles Richard Morris was born in Ancoats, Manchester on 14 December 1926 to George Morris and Jessie Murphy. His father, who was significantly disabled as result of his World War I injuries, worked as a sign writer; he died at the age of 44, when Charles was nine years old.

Morris lived in poverty alongside seven other siblings, all of whom faced a workhouse when their home was marked for slum clearance in 1935. Too poor to secure a council house, a local cleric helped them move to a nearby housing project in Newton Heath.

Morris was educated at Brookdale Park School, Manchester. He served with the Royal Engineers in the British Army from 1945 to 1948 before joining the Post Office. Morris was a member of the National Executive Council of the Union of Post Office Workers from 1959 to 1963. He joined the Labour Party in 1943 and served on Manchester City Council from 1954 to 1964.

== Parliamentary career ==
Morris first stood for Parliament at the 1959 general election in Cheadle without success, finishing last out of the three candidates. He was elected to represent Manchester Openshaw in Parliament at a by-election in December 1963, caused following the death of incumbent MP William Williams.

He was appointed Parliamentary Private Secretary (PPS) to Tony Benn, then Postmaster General, after Labour's victory at the 1964 general election. He became an Assistant Whip in 1966 and was promoted to Vice-Chamberlain of the Household the following year. Morris served as Deputy Chief Whip and Treasurer of the Household from 1969 until Labour's election defeat in 1970.

Morris was PPS to Harold Wilson during his second tenure as Leader of the Opposition from 1970 to 1974. He briefly served as Urban Affairs Minister in the Environment Department after Labour returned to government in 1974, and as Minister for the Civil Service Department from 1974 to 1979. Morris was appointed to the Privy Council in 1977.

His final frontbench role was as Shadow Deputy Leader of the House of Commons, which he held in the shadow cabinets of James Callaghan and Michael Foot from 1979 to 1983. He retired from Parliament after his constituency was abolished at the 1983 general election, as he was unable to secure candidacy in another constituency. Morris helped run Labour's unsuccessful 1983 general election campaign. After leaving Parliament, he returned to work at his former trade union.

== Personal life ==
His brother, Alf, served as Labour MP for Manchester Wythenshawe from 1964 until 1997, when he was appointed to the House of Lords. Alf introduced the first piece of disability rights legislation in history in 1970, and served as the first ever minister for disabled people from 1974 to 1979.

Morris married Pauline Dunn in 1950, with whom he had daughters Estelle and Heather. Estelle served as Labour MP for Birmingham Yardley from 1992 until 2005, when she was also appointed to the House of Lords. She served in the government of Tony Blair as Education and Skills Secretary from 2001 to 2002, and a Minister of State between 1997 and 2005.

He died from cancer on 8 January 2012 in Manchester.

== See also ==
- List of members of the United Kingdom House of Commons who died in 2012

Parliament of the United Kingdom
Preceded by William Williams	Member of Parliament for Manchester Openshaw; 1963–1983	Constituency abolished
Political offices
Preceded by Jack McCann	Vice-Chamberlain of the Household; 1967–1969	Succeeded by Alan Fitch
Preceded by Charles Grey	Treasurer of the Household; 1969–1970	Succeeded by Humphrey Atkins
New title	Minister of State, Environment; 1974	Succeeded by Denis Howell
Preceded by Robert Sheldon	Minister of State, Civil Service Department; 1974–1979	Succeeded by Paul Channon
