= John Baldwin (trade unionist) =

British trade union leader

John Baldwin (16 August 1923 – 28 November 2007) was a British trade union leader.

Born in West Ham, Baldwin grew up in Basildon, where he was educated at Laindon Road Secondary School. He joined the Royal Navy in 1938, later moving to serve in the Royal Marines, seeing action in numerous events from the Dunkirk evacuation to the D-day landings. He left the Marines in 1948, and soon became a steel erector, joining the Constructional Engineering Union (CEU).

Baldwin came to prominence in the CEU, becoming a shop steward, and then a convener. In 1957, he began working full-time for the union as an organiser, and in 1969 he was elected as its assistant general secretary. In 1971, the CEU became the Construction Section of the Amalgamated Union of Engineering Workers (AUEW), retaining considerable autonomy. He became general secretary of the section in 1976. He was initially seen as a left-winger, and despite his commitment to the Labour Party, he was also supported by the Communist Party of Great Britain. However, in 1980 he became frustrated with striking laggers on the Isle of Grain, and broke the strike by personally driving a bus through the picket line. He also worked on a scheme to move bargaining on pay and conditions from the site level to the national or regional level, believing that this would increase union authority, while also reducing the number of industrial disputes.

In 1984, following disputes in the AUEW, the Construction Section became a core part of the union, and Baldwin became its National Secretary (Construction), serving until his retirement in 1988. In 1978, Baldwin was made an Officer of the Order of the British Empire.

Trade union offices
Preceded by Eddie Marsden	General Secretary of the Construction Section of the Amalgamated Union of Engineering Workers; 1976–1984	Succeeded by Section merged
Preceded by New position	National Secretary (Construction) of the Amalgamated Engineering Union; 1984–1988	Succeeded by Tom Maclean
