= Charles Geddes, Baron Geddes of Epsom =

British trade unionist (1897–1983)

The Right Honourable The Lord Geddes of Epsom CBE
- Charles, Lord Geddes of Epsom was one of the first life peers.

Personal details
- Born: 1 March 1897 Camberwell, London
- Died: 2 May 1983 (aged 86)
- Parent(s): Thomas Geddes and Florence (Mills) Geddes
- Known for: Trade Unionist; Labour Party

Charles John Geddes, Baron Geddes of Epsom, CBE (1 March 1897 – 2 May 1983) was a British trade unionist.

Born in Camberwell, London, his parents were active socialists in the Labour movement at a time that the Labour party was being founded in London. Charles attended Blackheath Central School but left still aged only thirteen. He joined the Post Office in 1911 as a boy messenger, running errands. In his spare time he worked for a shopkeeper in Deptford, East London where he first came into contact with the Post Office Workers Union.

He served as a fighter pilot in the Royal Flying Corps during World War I, being commissioned a pilot officer in 1918.

On returning to civilian work, Geddes became active in the new Union of Post Office Workers rising to district chairman of the London district of the union's council. During the Second World War he was appointed assistant-general secretary of the UPW. He was Deputy General Secretary of the union from 1941, and then General Secretary from 1944 to 1957. In 1946 he joined the board of the TUC. He ruled on shipbuilding and engineering disputes for the Attlee government. He referred wage claims to an impartial body before the establishment of ACAS. Geddes became authoritative and knowledgeable about the extent and scope of industrial disputes. In 1955, he served as President of the Trades Union Congress.

Geddes was appointed to the London Transport Executive on its formation in 1948. He continued to be a member of the LTE and its successor, the London Transport Board until 1969.

Geddes was Chairman of Polyglass Ltd.

Appointed a Commander of the OBE in 1950,

In 1957, Geddes was offered a Knighthood by the Macmillan government, he accepted, and then promptly resigned his position in UPW.

On 5 August 1958, he became the third life peer created by letters patent under the Life Peerages Act 1958, with the title Baron Geddes of Epsom, of Epsom in the County of Surrey, and was introduced on 22 October. He argued strongly in his maiden speech for extending protection of old age pension schemes. He praised the plucky Londoners who had defended the country during the Blitz, suggestive of the man in the boiler suit, a kind of community socialist. Geddes was not especially happy in the Lords which involved much complicated legal procedure and conventional rules. Being a Keynesian he verged on a strongly unionised planned economy that was more socialist than mixed. He proposed round table negotiations with employers as a way of reducing unemployment. This new approach presaged the Wilsonian bureaucracy that attempted to modernise and improve productivity. Incentivisation was intrinsic argued Geddes, so that workers could share in economic benefits. In 1963 he told the Macmillan government that more investment was required in the Post Office.

He died aged 86.

Trade union offices
Preceded by James Paterson	Deputy General Secretary of the Union of Post Office Workers; 1941–1944	Succeeded by G. A. Stevens
Preceded by T. J. Hodgson	General Secretary of the Union of Post Office Workers; 1944–1956	Succeeded by Ron Smith
Preceded by John William Bowen	President of the Postal, Telegraph and Telephone International; 1949–1957	Succeeded by William Norton
Preceded by New position	President of the ICFTU European Regional Organisation; 1950–1957	Succeeded by Alfred Roberts
Preceded by Alfred Roberts	Trades Union Congress representative to the American Federation of Labour; 1953; With: Edwin Hall	Succeeded by Jim Baty and Jock Tiffin
Preceded by Jack Tanner	President of the Trades Union Congress; 1955	Succeeded by Wilfred Beard
Honorary titles
Preceded by The Lord Fraser of Lonsdale	Senior life peer 1974–1983	Succeeded by The Lord Granville-West
