= John Horam =

British politician and life peer (1939–2026)

The Right Honourable The Lord Horam
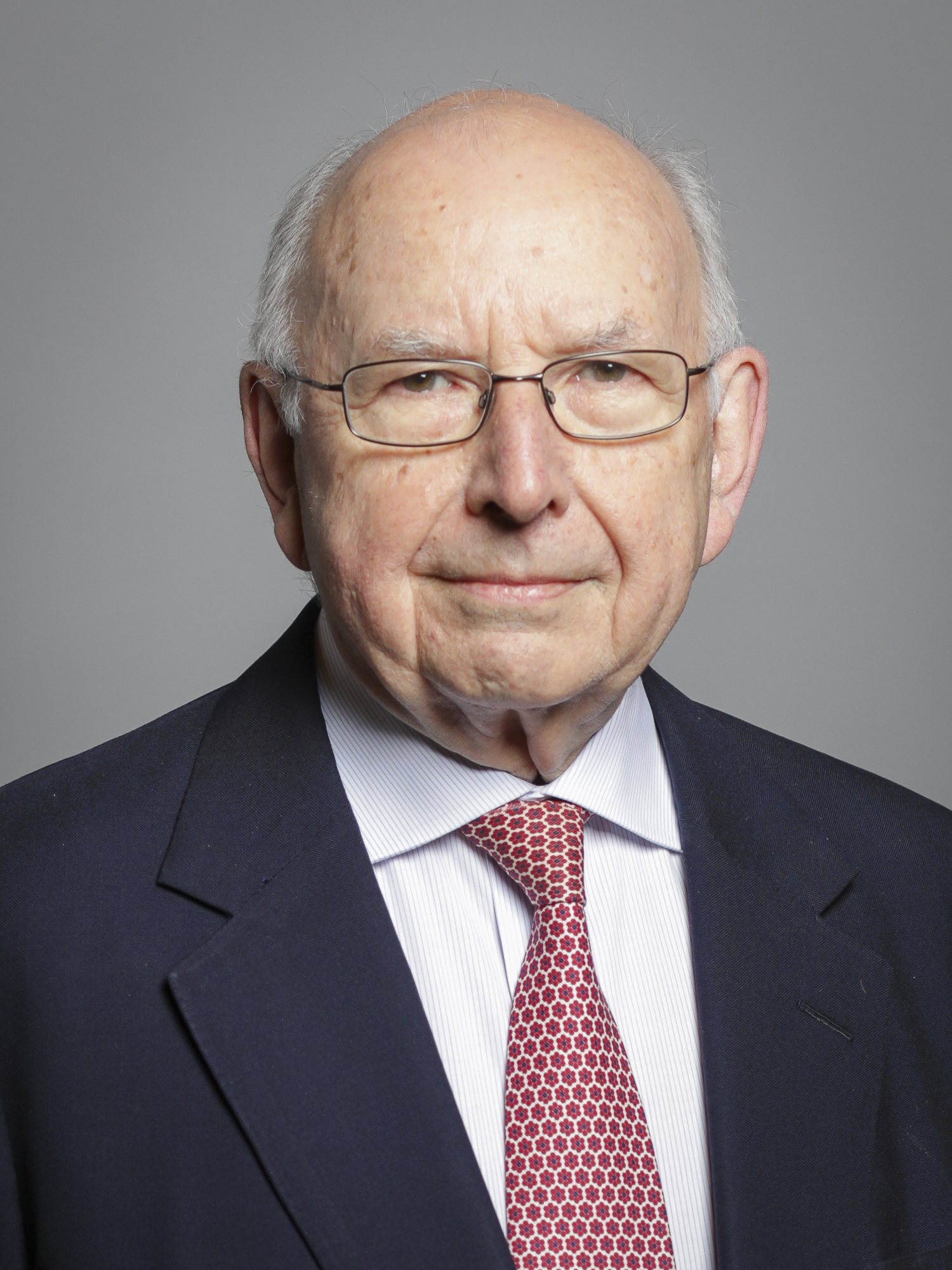
- Official portrait, 2019

Parliamentary Under-Secretary of State for Health
- In office 29 November 1995 – 2 May 1997
- Prime Minister: John Major
- Preceded by: Tom Sackville
- Succeeded by: Paul Boateng

Parliament Secretary to the Duchy of Lancaster Office
- In office 6 March 1995 – 27 November 1995
- Prime Minister: John Major
- Preceded by: Robert Hughes
- Succeeded by: David Willetts

Parliamentary Under-Secretary of State for Transport
- In office 12 September 1976 – 4 May 1979
- Prime Minister: James Callaghan
- Succeeded by: Kenneth Clarke

Member of the House of Lords
- Lord Temporal
- Life peerage 4 September 2013 – 24 July 2026

Member of Parliament for Orpington
- In office 9 April 1992 – 12 April 2010
- Preceded by: Ivor Stanbrook
- Succeeded by: Jo Johnson

Member of Parliament for Gateshead West
- In office 18 June 1970 – 13 May 1983
- Preceded by: Harry Randall
- Succeeded by: Constituency abolished

Personal details
- Born: 7 March 1939 Preston, Lancashire, England
- Died: 24 July 2026 (aged 87) Paddington, London, England
- Party: Conservative
- Other political affiliations: Labour (until 1981); SDP (1981–1987)
- Spouse: Judith Jackson
- Education: St Catharine's College, Cambridge (MA)

John Rhodes Horam, Baron Horam (7 March 1939 – 24 July 2026) was a British Conservative politician. He represented three parties in Parliament—originally a Labour MP, he defected to the SDP on its foundation in 1981, then to the Conservatives in 1987—and served as a minister in both Labour and Conservative governments. On 4 September 2013, he was created a working life peer as Baron Horam of Grimsargh in the County of Lancashire. He was a founder and vice chair of the Common Sense Group of Conservative parliamentarians.

== Early life and education ==
Horam was born in Grimsargh in the city of Preston, Lancashire, on 7 March 1939 to Sydney Horam, a fitter for Leyland Motors, and Catherine Harkness, who ran a dress shop and newsagents.

He attended the independent Silcoates School in Wakefield, West Yorkshire, where he was head boy, before going up to St Catharine's College, Cambridge, where he studied economics, gaining an MA in 1960. From 1960 to 1962 he was a market research officer with Rowntree & Co. in York. During his time there, he conducted market research for the new product "After Eight" Thin Mints. He then went into economic journalism, becoming a feature writer for the Financial Times and The Economist. Leaving journalism, he started, with a partner, a new company, CRU International Ltd, an international business consultancy specialising in minerals and metals. He was also the first chair of Circle Thirty Three Housing Association, now part of Clarion Housing.

He joined the Labour party at the age of 15 after hearing a speech by the party leader, Hugh Gaitskell.

== Parliamentary career ==
Over the course of his parliamentary career, Horam represented three political parties (Labour, the Social Democratic Party, and the Conservatives), and served as a government minister for two. After switching parties a second time, he was called a "dirty double-rat" by the Labour politician Dennis Skinner.

=== Labour ===
Horam contested Folkestone and Hythe for Labour in the 1966 election, but lost to the incumbent, Albert Costain. He was elected as the Labour MP for Gateshead West at the 1970 general election. He was a Chair of The Manifesto Group of right-wing Labour MPs, who supported James Callaghan to lead the Labour Party. Callaghan was duly elected party leader in April 1976 and thus became Prime Minister, and Horam was appointed to the government as Parliamentary Under-Secretary of State to Bill Rodgers in the Department of Transport, where he promoted an unsuccessful attempt to make seat belt use compulsory and oversaw the widening of a stretch of the M1 motorway. After Labour’s defeat in the 1979 general election, Horam became a Labour opposition spokesman on economic affairs.

=== Social Democratic Party ===
Horam was one of the first to leave the Labour Party for the SDP in 1981, having become uneasy with the leftward direction of Labour. From 1981 to 1983 he was SDP spokesman for economic affairs under Roy Jenkins. In the 1983 election, his constituency of Gateshead West having been abolished, he fought Newcastle Central, unsuccessfully, as an SDP candidate.

=== Conservative ===
Horam joined the Conservative Party shortly before the 1987 election, attracted by its economic strategy, having become disillusioned with the SDP, which he called "a botched job − Labour without the loonies", and in 1991 was selected as the Conservative candidate for Orpington, famous for the Liberal by-election victory when Harold Macmillan was Prime Minister. He won the 1992 election with a majority of 12,935 over the Liberal Democrats. When Tony Blair triumphed in 1997, Horam held the seat with a reduced majority. In 2001, when William Hague was the Conservative leader, he held on by only 269 votes. In 2005, however, he increased his majority to 4,947 over the longstanding Liberal Democrat candidate Chris Maines. The seat has remained Conservative ever since. Despite his constituency being only a short train journey from the House of Commons, Horam claimed expenses for the second home that he maintained there.

==== Ministerial positions ====
In March 1994 Horam was appointed Parliamentary Under-Secretary of State, Office of Public Service and Science in the Cabinet Office. In November 1995 he moved sideways to become Parliamentary Under-Secretary of State at the Department of Health. Here he had 31 different areas of responsibility but had two particularly large policy areas: reorganising Community Health Councils and establishing the Private Finance Initiative in health. He occupied this position until the Conservative defeat in the 1997 election. He is the only MP in recent times who has served as a Minister for both major parties.

==== Select Committee activity in the Commons ====
Following election as a Conservative MP in 1992, Horam was appointed a member of the Public Accounts Committee. This lasted until he was appointed a Minister in 1995. Following the Labour victory in 1997, he was elected the first Chair of the new Environmental Audit Committee, set up by the Labour government. The main focus of the Committee was the emerging problem of climate change. He held this position until July 2003. When he stood down a Commons motion praised him for his work. During this time, as Chair of a Committee, Horam was a member of the Commons Liaison Committee, which, among other duties, took evidence from the Prime Minister three times a year.

Following re-election in 2005, Horam was appointed a member of the Select Committee on Foreign Affairs, a position he held until 2010.

==== Political activity in the Commons ====
Horam gained some notoriety during the 1997 election when he became the first member of the Major government to come out publicly against joining a single European currency.

In 2003 he was one of a handful of Conservative MPs who voted against Britain’s participation in the Iraq War.

From 2003 to 2008 he was an elected member of the Executive of the Conservative Backbench 1992 Committee.

As part of his interest in parliamentary reform, he drafted the original "Equal Votes" legislation which stipulated that Parliamentary constituencies should be of roughly equal size.

On 12 October 2009, Horam announced his intention to stand down at the next general election.

==== Electoral Commission ====
On retiring from the House of Commons, Horam was appointed a Commissioner at the Electoral Commission, which supervises all elections and referendums in the UK. He held this post from 2011 to 2018.

==== House of Lords ====
On 4 September 2013 Horam was created a working life peer as Baron Horam, of Grimsargh in the County of Lancashire.

==== Lords Committee activity ====
On becoming a working peer, he was appointed to the Delegated Powers and Regulatory Reform Committee (2013–2014). He then moved to the Communications and Digital Committee (2014–2015). After this he became a member of the External Affairs Subcommittee of the European Union Committee (2015–19).

In March 2020 he joined the High Speed (West Midlands-Crewe) Bill Select Committee until its report in 2021.

==== Political activity in the Lords ====
In the Lords he advocated a living wage, raising the Income Tax threshold, better vocational training and more apprenticeships, more help for the Trouble Families Programme, and a big housing drive. A member of the Conservative European Mainstream Group, he was strongly pro-EU, believing that the UK maximises its influence and prosperity in the EU. After Brexit, he accepted the decision, but argued that Britain should remain a member of the Single European Market, like Norway.

==== Economic policy ====
In a speech in the Lords on 3 December 2020 on the Government’s spending Review, Horam said that he is a supporter of Modern Monetary Theory believing that "the economic Policy should balance the economy, rather than the Budget". Stating that, "rather than worrying too much about deficits, the advantage of MMT is that it enables Governments to concentrate on what should be done to improve the economy and society, and not be perpetually bogged down in arguments about how to pay for it." He positioned himself, on the raising of taxes, "that they should only be raised to damp down demand should inflation rise."

In support of the 2021 Budget he told the Lords that he, "[takes] the view the first fiscal rule of economics is, in all circumstances, to maximise real economic growth. The second rule is to make the distribution of the rewards of growth as fair as practically possible. I support the Budget because it made some real progress in both these areas. My only doubt about the Budget is the proposed rise in Corporation Tax, which is also a reservation on the part of the Office for Budget Responsibility."

In a speech on the second budget in 2021 in the Lords on 3 November 2021 he said: "The fact is that Britain has, for too long, been trying to get European levels of public service and welfare at US levels of taxation. The crunch has now come. The Government have given clear indication that they prioritise maintaining, and if possible improving, public services and are therefore prepared to put up taxation to the same extent. That is fundamentally right... There is therefore no evidence that a higher tax rate, within the sort of limits that we are talking about, necessarily adversely affects the rate of growth... A factor that is important is the way in which you use the money that you have raised." Lord Horam went on to criticise the decision to scrap the £20 uplift in Universal Credit, but said that apart from that blemish the Government’s economic strategy was right.

In the debate on the Autumn 2023 statement, Horam said: "I am afraid to say that we have been running the economy since what I call the Blair-Brown days in a very sub-optimal way, because it has relied on high and increasing levels of immigration... I suggest that the Government at the centre, in Downing Street or the Cabinet Office, take a long-term, holistic view of the demographic, environmental, societal and economic trends in the country and start to adjust the economic model that we have been pursuing over the last 20 or 30 years."

In a speech to the Lords on the Spring Budget 2024 debate on 18 March 2024 he said: "As an economist as well as a politician, I have always believed that the economy should work for everyone."

==== Levelling up ====
In his response to the Queen’s Speech of 2020 in January 2020, Lord Horam called for the Government to deliver on its promises made in the election to help the "towns and cities of the North of England and the Midlands". He welcomed the £3.5 billion being put behind the so-called Towns Fund. He also called for greater investment in technical education, better connections between London, the north and midlands and criticised the apprenticeship levy.

Also in that Queen’s speech, he was critical of the roll-out of Universal Credit, which he said needs "urgent attention" and acknowledged that while something needed to be done about social care, what was really needed was "a big cheque". The government could not deal with this investment by "a more relaxed approach to debt" and called for an increase in taxation specifically in relation to capital gains and dividends. He said that the UK was a "lightly taxed" country compared to others in Europe.

In a speech on 14 October 2021 in the Lords in a debate on Inequalities of Region and Place Horam praised the government's efforts in helping the north. He said: "We have a levelling-up fund, a community renewal fund, a shared prosperity fund, and free ports and towns funds. We have the beginning of effective localism in the shape of city mayors. I also think that levelling up will help the south. As the Prime Minister said when he was Mayor of London: "Do we really want the south-east of Britain, already the most densely populated major country in Europe, to resemble a giant suburbia?"

==== Environment, population growth and immigration ====
In a speech in the Lords on 10 December 2020 on the Statutory Instruments introducing new immigration rules, Horam said that "this Statutory instrument has been brought about by the UK’s exiting of the EU and therefore leaving the free movement of people system which prevails in the EU". He stated that the Blair Labour Government had bought in heavily to free movement and mass immigration and the results were devastating for some working class communities. He specifically cited the experience of Paul Embery, the Labour and trade union activist, whose book, Despised, sets out the effect on Dagenham, where he was born. Horam said he hopes that "present politicians of all parties understand the lessons of the last 20 years and listen more to the views of the British people".

In a letter to The Times on 7 September 2022, Horam wrote: “the rapid population growth of recent decades is causing significant housing, environmental and social problems for our already heavily populated island...and most (80 per cent) of the increase is down to immigration. The answer is to restore the limits and restraints on the number of work and other visas granted each year; these were part of government policy under all parties until the Blair government steadily abolished them.”

In a letter to The Times on 20 May 2023, Horam wrote: "There is a way of proving more genuinely affordable homes without destroying even more of the precious countryside in our small island. It includes reducing net immigration, banning second homes or taxing them more heavily, doing the same for foreign ownership of homes and revising the compulsory purchase laws to give local authorities the power to buy land at a reasonable rate."

==== The Union ====
In a letter to The Times on 2 July 2021 Lord Horam suggested that one way of improving Union relations within the UK would be to have “regular meetings between the Prime Minister and the First Ministers, revolving between Cardiff, Belfast, Edinburgh and London”.

==== Common Sense Group of Conservatives ====
As of 2021, Lord Horam was a member of the Common Sense Group of Conservative Parliamentarians chaired by Sir John Hayes. It campaigns for a tougher approach to immigration, breaking up the BBC, opposing “woke ideology” and attacks the concept of institutional racism.

== Personal life and death ==
Horam married Iris Crawley in 1977 and, after their divorce, Judith Jackson, a motoring journalist for The Sunday Times and The Guardian, in 1987. Jackson has two sons by a previous marriage, including the soldier and politician Lincoln Jopp, who was elected as Conservative MP for Spelthorne in the 2024 general election.

In 2010, Horam was elected a fellow commoner of St Catharine's College, Cambridge. In July 2018, he became the patron of the Grimsargh Wetlands Trust.

On 2 July 2026, Horam suffered a fall while walking home from the House of Lords. He never regained consciousness, and he died at St Mary's Hospital in Paddington, London, on 24 July. He was 87.

Parliament of the United Kingdom
Preceded by Harry Randall	Member of Parliament for Gateshead West; 1970 – 1983	Constituency abolished
Preceded by Ivor Stanbrook	Member of Parliament for Orpington; 1992 – 2010	Succeeded by Jo Johnson
