= Thomas Jackson (trade unionist) =

British trade unionist

Thomas Jackson (9 April 1925 – 6 June 2003) was a British trade unionist and is best remembered as the General Secretary of the Union of Post Office Workers who led 200,000 members into a 47-day strike in 1971, the first national postal strike.

Jackson was born in Leeds, West Yorkshire. Aged 14 he began work for the GPO as a telegraph boy. He spent three years (1943–46) on wartime service in the Royal Navy. Upon his return, he became a postman, and later a sorter, during which time he became involved in the affairs of the Union of Post Office Workers. He became a member of its executive council in 1955 and in 1964, was elected national officer. In 1967, he became General Secretary, a role he held until 1982. He was instantly recognizable to the public for his luxuriant handlebar moustache.

== Other positions held ==
- Governor, BBC (1968–73)
- Member, Annan Committee on the Future of Broadcasting (1974–77)
- Member, court and council of Sussex University (1974–78)
- HM Government appointed director, BP (1975–83)
- Chairman, General Council of TUC (1978–79)
- Chairman, TUC International Committee (1978–82)
- Chairman, Ilkley Literature Festival (1984–87)

Jackson married Norma Burrow in 1947 and had one daughter, Kim. In 1982, he divorced Burrow and married Kathleen Tognarelli in the same year, a marriage which produced another daughter.

After retirement from trade union activities, he ran a second-hand book business, specializing in recipe books. He refused honours from Harold Wilson and later the offer of a peerage in James Callaghan's resignation list in 1979. He died in Ilkley, West Yorkshire on 6 June 2003 aged 78.

Trade union offices
Preceded by Ron Smith	General Secretary of the Union of Communication Workers; 1967-82	Succeeded by Alan Tuffin
Preceded by David Basnett	President of the Trades Union Congress; 1979	Succeeded by Terry Parry
Preceded by Alfred Allen	Trades Union Congress representative to the AFL-CIO; 1981	Succeeded by Geoffrey Drain
