= Delyth Morgan, Baroness Morgan of Drefelin =

British politician (born 1961)

The Right Honourable The Baroness Morgan of Drefelin
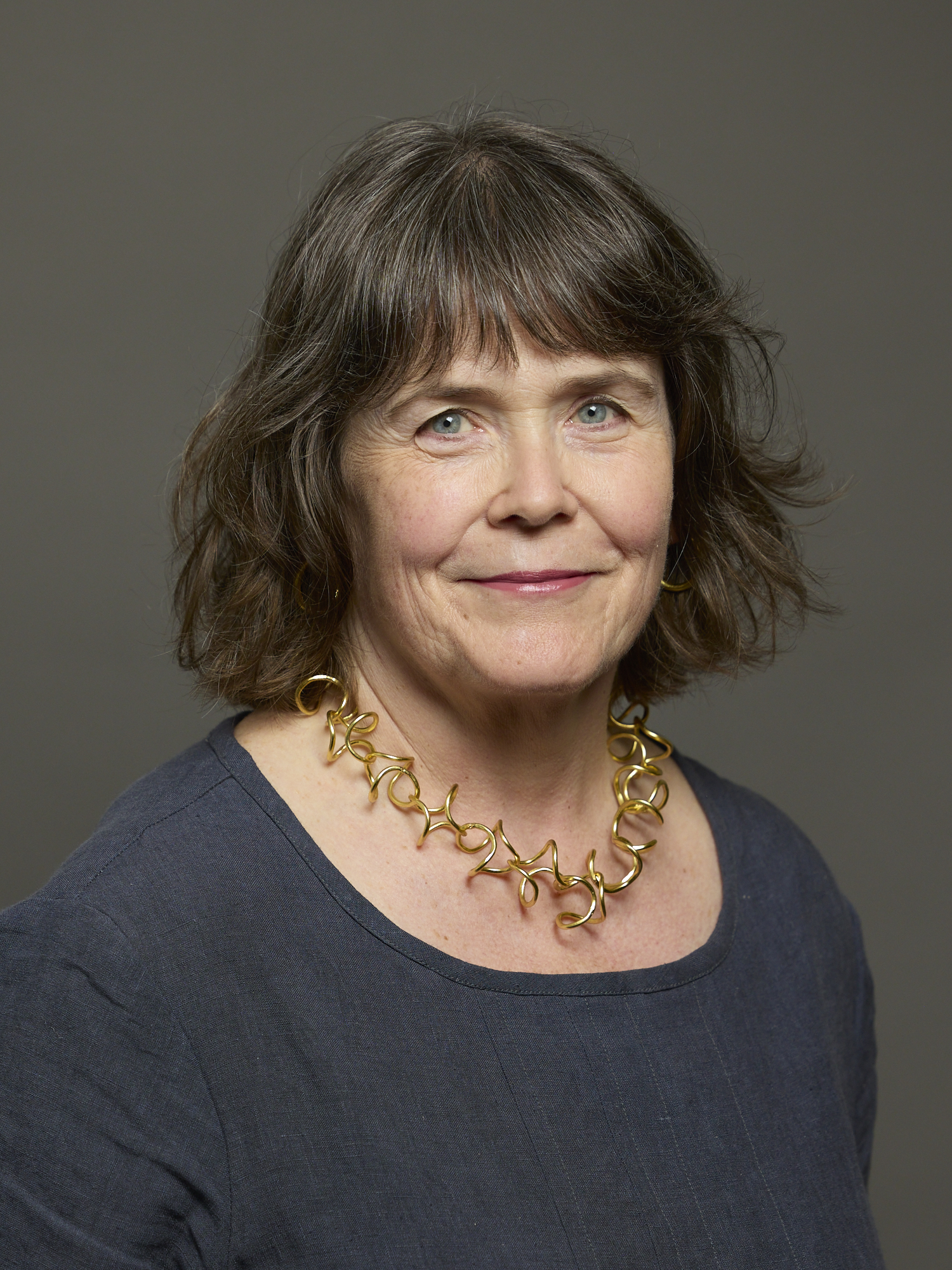
- Official portrait, 2025

Parliamentary Under-Secretary of State for Children, Schools and Families
- In office 5 October 2008 – 6 May 2010
- Prime Minister: Gordon Brown
- Preceded by: Kevin Brennan
- Succeeded by: Tim Loughton

Parliamentary Under-Secretary of State for Intellectual Property and Quality
- In office 24 January 2008 – 5 October 2008
- Prime Minister: Gordon Brown
- Preceded by: The Lord Triesman
- Succeeded by: The Lord Young of Norwood Green

Baroness-in-Waiting Government Whip
- In office 9 January 2007 – 5 October 2008
- Prime Minister: Tony Blair; Gordon Brown
- Preceded by: The Lord McKenzie of Luton
- Succeeded by: The Lord Young of Norwood Green

Member of the House of Lords
- Lord Temporal
- Life peerage 11 June 2004

Personal details
- Born: 30 August 1961 (age 65) London England
- Party: Labour (2004-2011, 2024-)
- Other political affiliations: Crossbench (2011-2024)
- Spouse: Jim Shepherd (1991-present)
- Education: University College, London
- Website: www.baronessmorgan.org.uk

Delyth Jane Morgan, Baroness Morgan of Drefelin (born 30 August 1961) is a Crossbench peer in the House of Lords of the United Kingdom, having formerly sat as a Labour peer. She was raised to the peerage in 2004 and appointed Chief Executive of the Breast Cancer Campaign, now Breast Cancer Now, in 2011. She was educated at Bedford College, London, BSc Physiology & Biochemistry, 1983, now part of Royal Holloway, University of London, and also University College London. She was president of the London University Union (1985–86).

== Professional career ==
Before being raised to the peerage Morgan had a long and successful career in the voluntary sector, including a decade at the helm of Breakthrough Breast Cancer. She played a leading role in creating breast cancer as a high-profile issue when it had been a hidden and rarely discussed condition. She also led fund raising efforts which resulted in the opening in 1999 of the UK's first dedicated breast cancer research facility, the Breakthrough Toby Robins Breast Cancer Research Centre at the Institute of Cancer Research.

As of April 2017 she is Chief Executive of Breast Cancer Now, which was formed in 2015 by a merger of the Breast Cancer Campaign and Breakthrough Breast Cancer.

== Government career ==
On 5 October 2008, Morgan was announced as Minister for the Department for Children, Schools and Families, replacing Kevin Brennan. She was previously Parliamentary Under-Secretary of State (Intellectual Property and Quality) in the Department for Innovation, Universities and Skills.

== Lords career ==
Morgan was created a life peer on 11 June 2004 taking the title Baroness Morgan of Drefelin, of Drefelin in the County of Dyfed.

Baroness Morgan has held the following positions in the House of Lords:

- Government Whip, 2007–08
- Government Spokesperson for:
  - Communities and Local Government, 2007–08
  - Work and Pensions, 2007–08
  - Scotland, 2007–08
  - Wales, 2007
  - Cabinet Office, 2008
- Parliamentary Under-Secretary of State (Intellectual Property and Quality), Department for Innovation, Universities and Skills, 2008
- Parliamentary Under-Secretary of State, Department for Children, Schools and Families, 2008–2010
- Opposition spokesperson for education, 2010

She worked in London for many years prior to being raised to the peerage. After joining the House of Lords she purchased a property in Cardiganshire and designated this as her main home for expenses purposes. Following a complaint the House of Lords Privilege and Conduct Committee found there had been no breach of the rules.

== Honours ==
Morgan was made a Fellow of University College London (her alma mater) in 2005, a Founding Fellow of Breakthrough Breast Cancer, an Honorary Fellow of the Institute of Cancer Research in 2006 and, in 2005, an Honorary Fellow of Cardiff University.

== Personal life ==
Morgan is of Welsh heritage. She divides her time between Wales and London and lives with her husband. They have one daughter. In her spare time she enjoys walking and listening to and playing live music.
