= Communication Workers Union (United Kingdom) =

UK trade union

- Abbreviation: CWU
- Predecessor: National Communications Union; Union of Communication Workers
- Founded: January 1995; 31 years ago
- Headquarters: 150 The Broadway, Wimbledon, London SW19 1RX
- Location: United Kingdom
- Members: ▲168,005 (2025)
- General Secretary: Dave Ward
- Publication: The Voice
- Affiliations: TUC; ICTU; STUC; GFTU; A4F; Labour Party; NSSN; Momentum
- Website: cwu.org

The Communication Workers Union (CWU) is the main trade union in the United Kingdom for people working for telephone, cable, digital subscriber line (DSL), postal delivery, and tech companies. As of 2017, it had 110,000 Royal Mail members and more in many other communication companies.

Formed in 1995 by the merger of the Union of Communication Workers and National Communications Union, its current general secretary is Dave Ward. Its affiliations include the Labour Party, Momentum and 1st Class Credit Union.

The CWU was involved in the 2007 and 2009 Royal Mail industrial disputes and the 2022–2023 United Kingdom postal workers' strikes. Members working for telecommunications company BT undertook strike action in the 2010, 2021 and 2022 BT Group strikes.

== Background ==
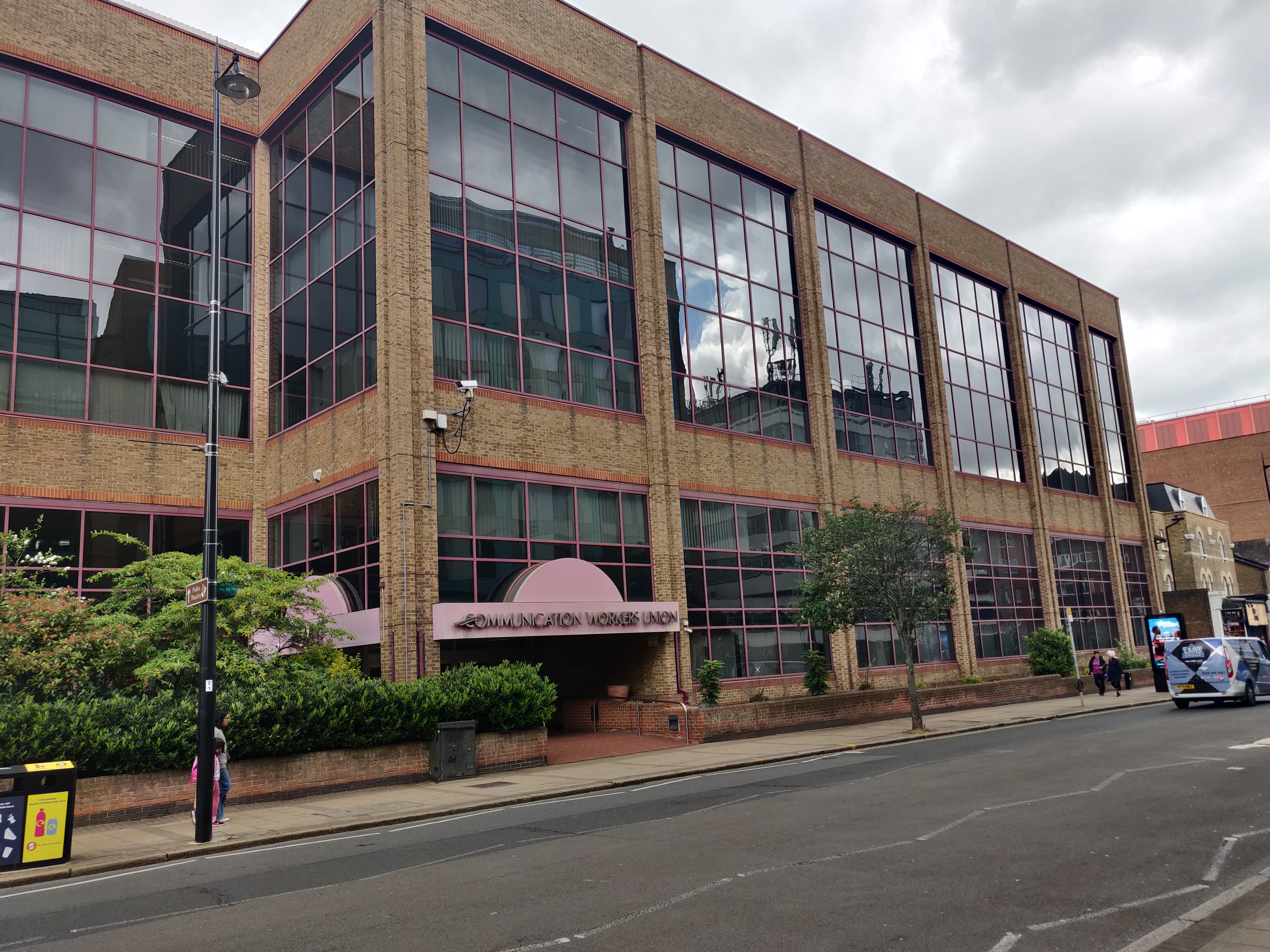
Headquarter building in Wimbledon

The Communication Workers Union was formed in 1995 by the merging of the Union of Communication Workers and the National Communications Union.

As of 2001, the CWU had 240,000 members.

== Sectors ==
CWU members work for Royal Mail, the Post Office, BT, O2, Sky, Accenture HR Services, EE, Virgin Media and other communication companies. Members' expertise includes engineering, computing, clerical, mechanical, driving, retail, financial and manual skills.

In 2020 United Tech and Allied Workers was formed as a branch of the CWU to represent workers in the technology industry.

== Royal Mail workers industrial action ==
=== 2007 ===
Royal Mail workers undertook a strike in 2007 after a disagreement over pay and pensions. On 7 June, the union's postal members voted by 77.5% to strike after a 2.5% pay rise coupled with £350 million every year for five years (totalling £1.5 billion) of cuts was offered. They took their first one-day strike on 29 June, and the second on 12 July and 13 July. The action then progressed to a series of rolling strikes.

=== 2009 ===
Further industrial action was taken in 2009. An overwhelming three-to-one vote in favour backed the dispute, and two days of national strike action were called in October. This followed significant periods of local strike action in London, Bristol and areas of Scotland. Following the national days of action, the Trades Union Congress (TUC) were involved in brokering an "interim agreement" that provided a "period of calm" for the union and Royal Mail to negotiate a full and final agreement on the introduction of modernisation and relevant working practices. Following the interim agreement, strike action was suspended and talks held under the auspices of the Advisory, Conciliation and Arbitration Service (Acas).

In December, a national agreement was struck and a ballot of the membership on an agreement on pay and working conditions was carried out. This agreement was overwhelmingly supported by CWU members in January 2010. The agreement increased pay and changed working arrangements, particularly in delivery. The agreement was headed "business transformation" and discussions and implementation arrangements continued nationally and in each workplace on the detail of the agreement. As a result, both the union and Royal Mail claimed to have agreed a fully funded modernisation plan.

== BT workers industrial action ==
=== 2010 BT industrial dispute ===
In early 2010, the CWU balloted all of its BT employed members for strike action due to a pay dispute. The initial strike ballot was ultimately cancelled due to a legal issue with mobile workers' data, but following extensive negotiations, the CWU reached an agreed settlement on pay with BT. A national ballot of members overwhelmingly agreed to accept the negotiated pay deal.

=== 2021 RPE industrial dispute and strike ===
On 24 February 2021, 170 BT Openreach employees commenced a total of three weeks' strike action in opposition to the company's unagreed changes to their terms and conditions, along with proposals that could impact taxpayer expenditure for public funded projects.

CWU Deputy General Secretary Andy Kerr commented that "the fact that management's total intransigence on the issue has resulted in the first industrial action anywhere in BT Group for 22 years tells its own story".

The staff involved were Repayment Project Engineers (RPE). Their job involved diverting and/or protecting BT cables during major building works, including local authority and government schemes.

The dispute was officially resolved in July 2021 when the CWU and BT Group executives signed a national framework agreement on job security, redundancy terms, and site closures, which successfully avoided a company-wide strike.

=== 2022 BT and Openreach industrial dispute and strike ===
In June 2022, the CWU conducted its first company-wide industrial action ballot in BT Group since 1987. In Openreach, where 28,425 CWU members were entitled to vote, participants recorded a 95.8% "yes" vote for industrial action on a 74.8% turnout. In BT, where 10,353 were issued with ballot papers, another "yes" vote of 91.5% was recorded on a 58.2% turnout.

The CWU hoped that such an overwhelming demonstration of workforce anger would persuade management back to the negotiating table were, however, met with BT categorically refusing to re-open 2022 pay negotiations.

As a result, the first national industrial action in BT Group for three and a half decades took place on 29 July and 1 August – with the all-out strike days being solidly observed by members in both BT and Openreach.

Two further all-out strike days took place on 30 and 31 August. Another four days of strike action were announced for 6, 10, 20 and 24 October.

The dispute, which involved more than 40,000 CWU members working for BT and Openreach, was triggered by BT's unilateral imposition of real-terms pay cuts for all CWU-represented grades.

== Affiliations ==
=== Labour Party ===
The CWU has long been affiliated with the Labour Party; for example, former General Secretary Alan Johnson became a Labour Member of Parliament (MP) and ultimately held a number of Cabinet posts including Home Secretary. Since 2001, the CWU has donated over £9 million to the Labour Party. However, relationships became strained over Labour plans to privatise Royal Mail in 2007 and Dave Ward, the CWU's representative on the National Executive Committee of the Labour Party, announced he was stepping down from this role because he believed it conflicted with the interests of union members. He was replaced by Andy Kerr.

At the CWU Annual Conference 2008 there was much debate about the union's relationship with Labour. It was agreed, and remains union policy, that a ballot would be held to cease funds to the party if privatisation of postal services took place. The Labour government in 2009's privatisation proposal, the Postal Services Bill, was defeated through the union's campaign, and affiliation has remained in place. The campaign was led by the left-wing Labour loyalist and long-term General Secretary Billy Hayes, with the support of Labour backbenchers.

Since the 2010 election of the Conservative–Liberal Democrat coalition government, the union has sought to redefine its relationship with the Labour Party. In July 2010 the union's National Executive Committee agreed to nominate and support Ed Balls for Labour leader in the 2010 leadership ballot. In turn, Ed Balls supported the union's Keep The Post Public campaign in the summer of 2010 in opposition of the planned coalition government's intention to privatise Royal Mail.

In September 2015, the CWU endorsed the Jeremy Corbyn 2015 Labour Party leadership campaign.

In August 2017, it was announced that the CWU would formally affiliate to the left-wing political organisation Momentum after its ruling executive voted unanimously in favour of joining. General Secretary Dave Ward told the New Statesman that "the general election showed the value of Momentum as part of the wider labour movement", and that the body, which emerged from Corbyn's 2015 leadership campaign, was now "a major political force in the UK" with a "key role to play in securing a transformative Labour government".

=== 1st Class Credit Union ===
1st Class Credit Union was formed in 1992 as Glasgow District Postal Workers Credit Union, then became the Scottish Postal Workers Credit Union in 1998 before adopting its present name in 2007. A member of the Association of British Credit Unions, it is open to members and employees of the CWU.

The credit union is authorised by the Prudential Regulation Authority and regulated by the Financial Conduct Authority and the PRA. Ultimately, like the banks and building societies, members’ savings are protected against business failure by the Financial Services Compensation Scheme.

In 2016, it was awarded a £600,000 grant by the Lloyds Banking Group Credit Union Development Fund to strengthen its capital asset ratio.

== Leadership ==
The following people have served as general secretary of the Communication Workers Union:

- 1995–1997: Alan Johnson (Union of Communication Workers) and Tony Young (National Communications Union)
- 1997–1998: Derek Hodgson and Tony Young
- 1998–2001: Derek Hodgson
- 2001–2015: Billy Hayes
- 2015–present: Dave Ward

The second most senior official was the senior deputy general secretary:

- 1998–?: Tony Young
- 2001–?: Tony Kearns
- 2025: Post abolished

== Works cited ==
- Jefferys, Steve; Whitston, Colin; Roe, Alan (2001). "Taking the Pulse of British Trade Unionism: Inside the Communication Workers' Union". In Jefferys, Steve; Beyer, Frederik Mispelblom; Thörnqvist, Christer (eds.). European working lives: continuities and change in management and industrial relations in France, Scandinavia and the UK. Cheltenham: Edward Elgar. ISBN 978-1-84064-476-0.
