= Anthony Young, Baron Young of Norwood Green =

British politician and Labour Party life peer (born 1942)

The Right Honourable The Lord Young of Norwood Green
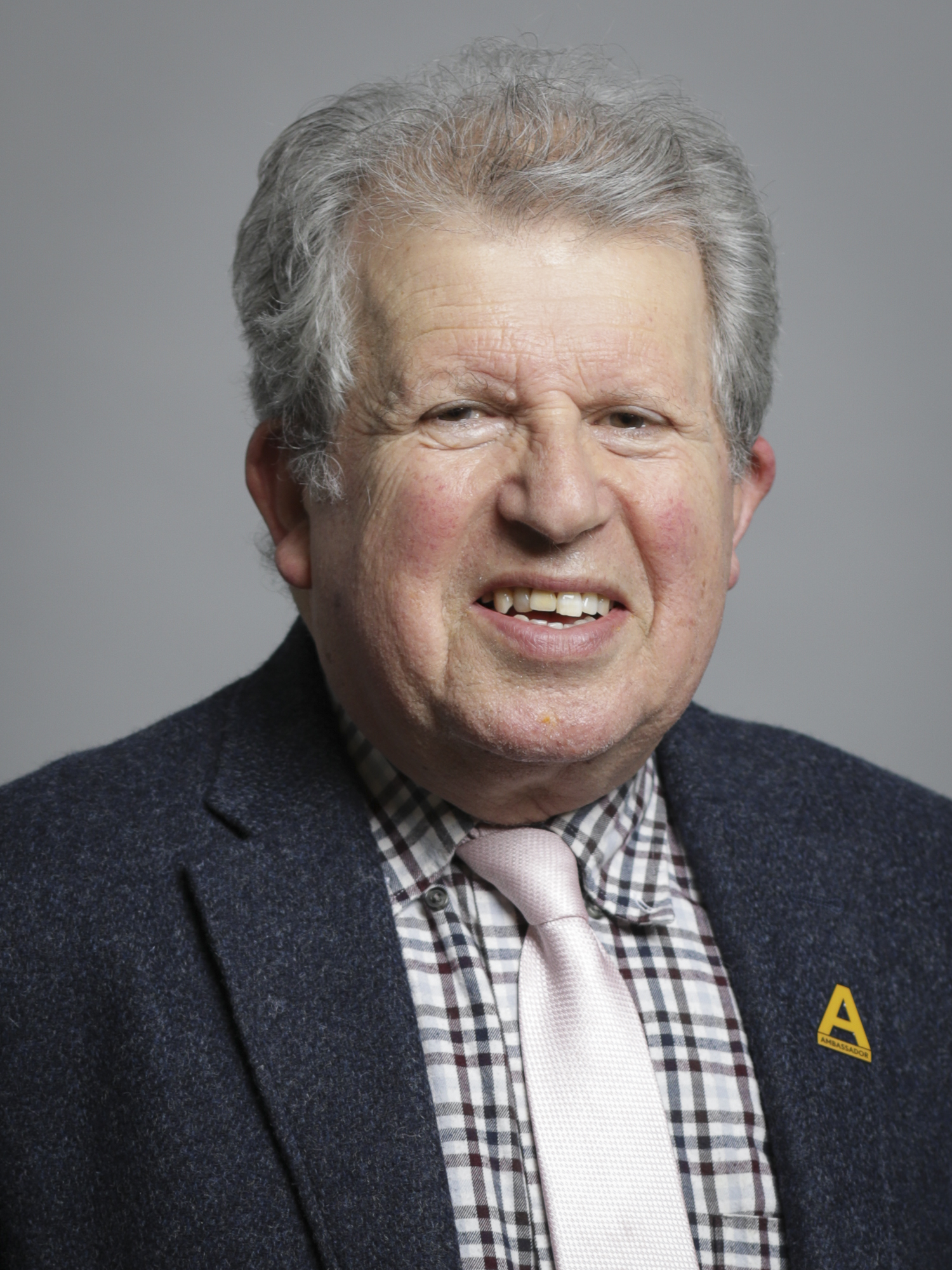
- Young in 2020

Parliamentary Under-Secretary of State for Postal Affairs and Employment Relations
- In office 5 June 2009 – 11 May 2010
- Prime Minister: Gordon Brown
- Preceded by: office established
- Succeeded by: Ed Davey

Parliamentary Under-Secretary of State for Skills and Apprenticeships
- In office 5 October 2008 – 5 June 2009
- Prime Minister: Gordon Brown
- Preceded by: The Baroness Morgan of Drefelin
- Succeeded by: Iain Wright

Member of the House of Lords
- Lord Temporal
- Life peerage 25 June 2004

Personal details
- Born: Anthony Ian Young; 14 April 1942 (age 84)
- Party: Labour
- Occupation: Trades union official (NCU & CWU)

Anthony Ian Young, Baron Young of Norwood Green (born 14 April 1942) is a British politician and Labour Party life peer in the House of Lords.

== Professional career ==
He had previously been General Secretary of the National Communications Union (1989–1995), then joint General Secretary (1995–1998), then Senior Deputy General Secretary (1998–2002) of the Communication Workers Union. He also served as a Governor of the BBC.

== Parliamentary career ==
In the 2002 Birthday Honours Young was awarded a knighthood, having the honour conferred by The Prince of Wales on 13 December 2002. He was created a life peer on 25 June 2004 taking the title Baron Young of Norwood Green, of Norwood Green in the London Borough of Ealing.

In October 2008 he was appointed as Parliamentary Under-Secretary of State for Skills and Apprenticeships in the Department for Innovation, Universities and Skills, being moved to the Department for Business, Innovation and Skills when it was created in the June 2009 reshuffle, continuing as a Parliamentary Under Secretary of State, but with responsibility for Employment Relations and Postal Affairs until 11 May 2010.

In June 2021, Young was appointed as a trustee of LGB Alliance.

In March 2022, he was reprimanded in the House of Lords after falling asleep during a debate on genetically modified organisms.

He is Jewish.

Trade union offices
Preceded by John Golding	General Secretary of the National Communications Union; 1989–1995	Merged into CWU
New post	General Secretary of the Communication Workers Union; 1995–1998; With: Alan Johnson (1995–1997); Derek Hodgson (1997–1998)	Succeeded by Derek Hodgson
New post	Senior Deputy General Secretary of the Communication Workers Union; 1998–2002	Succeeded by Tony Kearns
Preceded by Bill Morris	President of the Trades Union Congress; 2001	Succeeded by Nigel de Gruchy
Orders of precedence in the United Kingdom
Preceded by The Lord Valance of Tummel	Gentlemen; Baron Young of Norwood Green	Followed by The Lord Rowlands
