= George Woods (British politician) =

British minister and politician

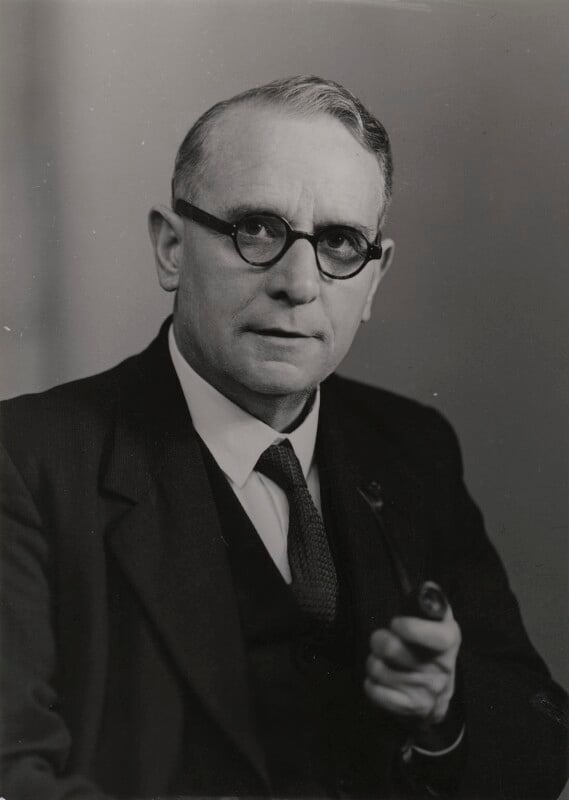
- Woods in 1950

Member of Parliament for Droylsden
- In office 1950-1951

Member of Parliament for Mossley
- In office 1945-1950

Member of Parliament for Finsbury
- In office 1935-1945

Personal details
- Born: 13 September 1886
- Died: 9 July 1951 (aged 64) York, England
- Party: Labour and Co-operative
- Education: Handsworth College; Manchester College, Oxford

The Reverend George Saville Woods (13 September 1886 – 9 July 1951) was a British Unitarian minister and Labour and Co-operative politician.

== Biography ==
The son of Thomas William and Alice Antice Woods, he was educated at Handsworth College, Birmingham and Manchester College, Oxford. From 1914 to 1921 Woods served as minister at Mary Street Chapel, Taunton, Somerset, and from 1921 as minister of York Unitarian Chapel.

He became active in the co-operative movement and labour politics, holding at different times the chairmanship of the Taunton Labour Party, the York Labour Party and the York Co-operative Society. He was elected to the York Board of Guardians and York City Council. In 1929 and 1931 he fought the Yorkshire seat of Barkston Ash but could not defeat the Conservative candidate.

At the 1935 general election he was elected as Member of Parliament (MP) for Finsbury in London, unseating George Masterman Gillett of the National Labour Organisation. Due to the Second World War, the next election was not held until 1945. Woods was elected as MP for Mossley in Lancashire. When the Mossley seat was abolished in 1950, he was elected for the new seat of Droylsden, and was its member at the time of his death in a York hospital in July 1951, aged 64.

Parliament of the United Kingdom
Preceded by George Gillett	Member of Parliament for Finsbury; 1935–1945	Succeeded by John Platts-Mills
Preceded by Austin Hopkinson	Member of Parliament for Mossley; 1945–1950	constituency abolished
New constituency	Member of Parliament for Droylsden; 1950–1951	Succeeded by William Williams
