= Gateshead West =

Parliamentary constituency in the United Kingdom, 1950–1983

- Former borough constituency for the House of Commons
- Boundary of Gateshead West in County Durham, boundaries 1974-83
- County: County Durham

1950–1983
- Seats: One
- Created from: Gateshead
- Replaced by: Tyne Bridge and Gateshead East

Gateshead West was a parliamentary constituency represented in the House of Commons of the Parliament of the United Kingdom from 1950 to 1983. It elected one Member of Parliament (MP) by the first-past-the-post system of election.

== History ==
Gateshead West, as could be inferred from the name, formed the western part of the Borough of Gateshead, now in Tyne and Wear. The constituency was created by the Representation of the People Act 1948 for the 1950 general election when the existing Gateshead seat was split in two. It was abolished for the 1983 general election, when the majority of the electorate was included in the new constituency of Tyne Bridge, which also included central areas of Newcastle upon Tyne. Remaining areas were transferred to Gateshead East.

It returned Labour MPs for the entire period of its existence.

== Boundaries ==
=== 1950–1955 ===
- The County Borough of Gateshead wards of Central, North, North West, West, and West Central.

=== 1955–1964 ===
- The County Borough of Gateshead wards of Central, East Central, North, North East, North West, West, and West Central.

The East Central and North East wards were transferred from Gateshead East.

=== 1964–1983 ===
- The County Borough of Gateshead wards of Askew, Bensham, Chandless, Claremont, Riverside, Saltwell, Shipcote, and Teams.

Minor changes to reflect redistribution of local authority wards.

== Members of Parliament ==
Election	Member	Party
1950	John Hall	Labour
1955 by-election	Harry Randall	Labour
1970	John Horam	Labour
1981	John Horam	SDP
1983	constituency abolished	

== Election results ==
=== Elections in the 1970s ===
General election 1979: Gateshead West
Party	Candidate	Votes	%	±%
Labour	John Horam	13,533	67.24	
Conservative	DR Kelly	5,221	25.94	
Liberal	Frank Patterson	1,185	5.89	
National Front	H Beadle	186	0.92	New
Majority		8,312	41.30	
Turnout		20,125	69.31	
Labour hold		Swing		

General election October 1974: Gateshead West
Party	Candidate	Votes	%	±%
Labour	John Horam	13,859	68.61	
Conservative	P Brown	4,432	21.94	
Liberal	K Stoddart	1,909	9.45	
Majority		9,427	46.67	
Turnout		20,200	65.65	
Labour hold		Swing		

General election February 1974: Gateshead West
Party	Candidate	Votes	%	±%
Labour	John Horam	13,839	61.01	
Conservative	John Heddle	5,372	23.68	
Liberal	J Bennison	3,474	15.31	New
Majority		8,467	37.33	
Turnout		22,685	74.20	
Labour hold		Swing		

General election 1970: Gateshead West
Party	Candidate	Votes	%	±%
Labour	John Horam	15,622	68.07	
Conservative	John O'Sullivan	7,328	31.93	
Majority		8,294	36.14	
Turnout		22,950	66.59	
Labour hold		Swing		

=== Elections in the 1960s ===
General election 1966: Gateshead West
Party	Candidate	Votes	%	±%
Labour	Harry Randall	20,381	74.77	
Conservative	Ernest Greenwood	6,878	25.23	
Majority		13,503	49.54	
Turnout		27,259	70.11	
Labour hold		Swing		

General election 1964: Gateshead West
Party	Candidate	Votes	%	±%
Labour	Harry Randall	21,390	68.97	
Conservative	Derek R Chapman	9,623	31.03	
Majority		11,767	37.94	
Turnout		31,013	74.93	
Labour hold		Swing		

=== Elections in the 1950s ===
General election 1959: Gateshead West
Party	Candidate	Votes	%	±%
Labour	Harry Randall	21,277	64.90	
Conservative	David A Wright	11,509	35.10	
Majority		9,768	29.80	
Turnout		32,786	76.88	
Labour hold		Swing		

1955 Gateshead West by-election
Party	Candidate	Votes	%	±%
Labour	Harry Randall	13,196	66.46	+1.14
Conservative	David A Wright	6,661	33.54	−1.14
Majority		6,535	32.92	+2.28
Turnout		19,857		
Labour hold		Swing		

General election 1955: Gateshead West
Party	Candidate	Votes	%	±%
Labour	John Hall	22,040	65.32	
Conservative	James Quigley	11,071	34.68	
Majority		10,339	30.64	
Turnout		33,111		
Labour hold		Swing		

General election 1951: Gateshead West
Party	Candidate	Votes	%	±%
Labour	John Hall	20,790	63.77	
National Liberal	John S Magnay	11,811	36.23	
Majority		8,979	27.54	
Turnout		32,601	83.81	
Labour hold		Swing		

General election 1950: Gateshead West
Party	Candidate	Votes	%	±%
Labour	John Hall	20,872	64.16	
National Liberal	John S Magnay	11,660	35.84	
Majority		9,212	28.32	
Turnout		32,532	83.90	
Labour win (new seat)				

== See also ==
- History of parliamentary constituencies and boundaries in Durham
