= Telegraph boy =

Person who delivers a telegram

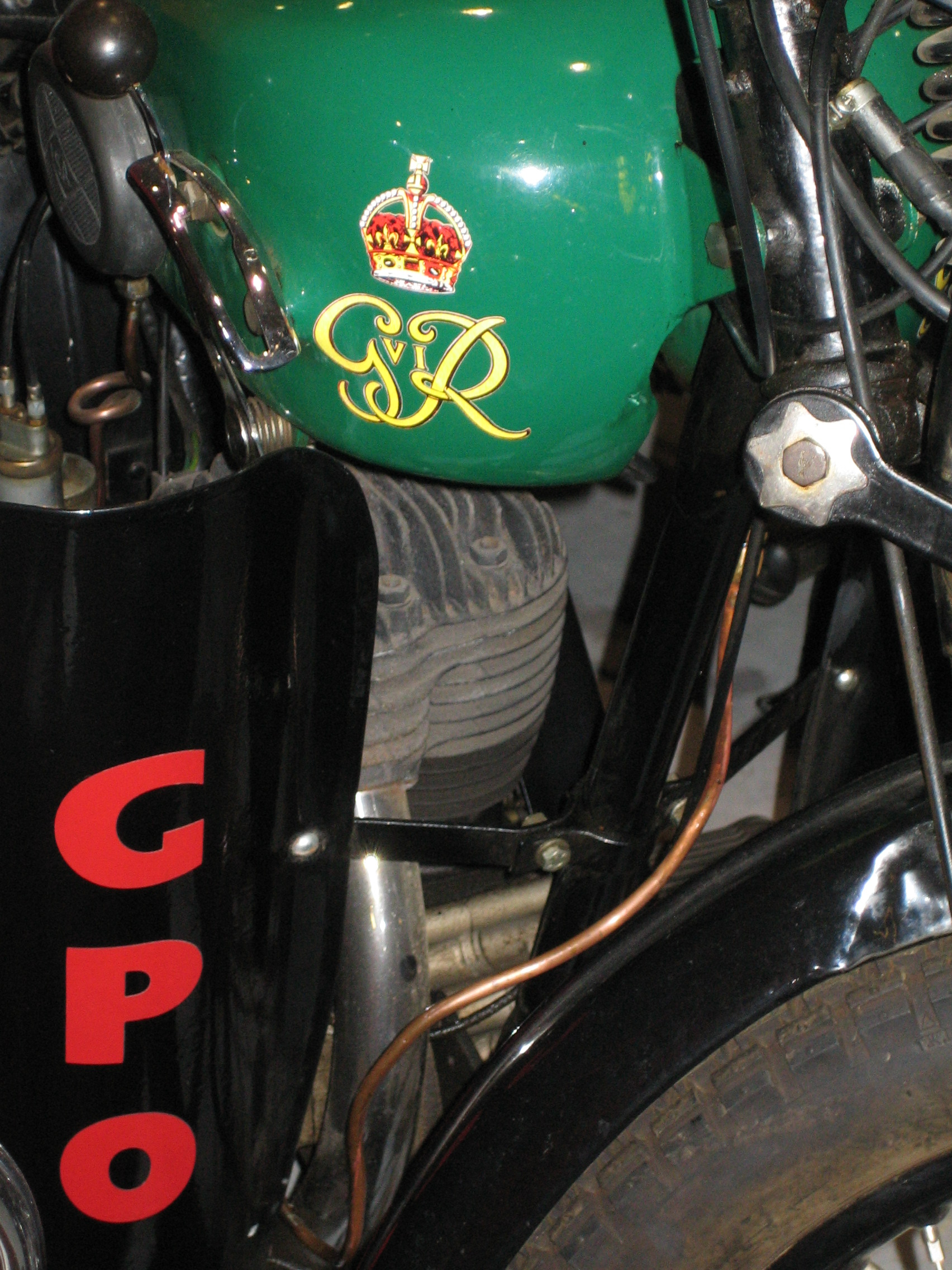
The UK's GPO (General Post Office) Telegram messenger motorbike of the 1940s

In many English-speaking countries, a telegram delivery boy, telegraph boy or telegram boy was a young man employed to deliver telegrams, usually on bicycle. In the United Kingdom, these messengers were employed by the General Post Office; in the United States, they worked for Western Union or other telegraph companies.

== In the United Kingdom ==
Telegram boys became popular in the United Kingdom after the General Post Office took over control of inland telegraphs from the railways and private telegraph companies. Many of the boys employed by these services to deliver telegrams transferred to the Post Office.

In some respects, the life of a telegram boy was not unlike that of someone in military service. They were expected to behave in a manner befitting one who wore the uniform of the Queen, and were required to complete a daily drill. Messengers, at least in London, were required to carry a blue book of instructions at all time, and produce them whenever they were ordered to. Rules included specifications on appearance, dictating that messengers must keep themselves clean and their hair short, and be courteous whenever speaking to anyone. The rulebook also sought to control their behavior, forbidding messenger boys from sliding down staircase handrails; from smoking, gambling, or playing cards while in uniform; and from entering public houses except to deliver messages. From 1915 to 1921, morning exercise was added to these requirements.

During the 1930s the Post Office introduced motorcycles. This started in Leeds where boys aged 17 were allowed to volunteer for training, but only with the permission of their parents. However, following the success of this, motorcycles were soon introduced elsewhere in the country. The fleet was comprised almost exclusively of BSA B33-1 250cc motorbikes which boys were expected to ride at an average of 15 mph. Later 125cc BSA Bantams were used. These were finally replaced with smaller Raleigh and Puch models.

During its heyday in the 1930s, the service was delivering an average of 65 million telegrams per year; however, the service was running at a loss, estimated at £1 million annually.

Throughout the 1960s and 1970s the use of telegrams had dropped significantly, with around 10 million sent annually in the mid-1960s. Consequently, the Post Office took the decision in 1977 to abolish the service. The service continued for a few years and was briefly operated by British Telecom after it split from the Post Office. British Telecom announced on 19 October 1981 that the telegram would be discontinued, and it was finally taken out of service on 30 September 1982 after 139 years in the United Kingdom.

The telegram as such was superseded by the British Telecom Telemessage service, introduced in October 1982. Messages were dictated over the telephone or sent via telex, printed, and delivered overnight by first class post in a distinctive envelope guaranteed for next day delivery, rather than by messenger.

== In the United States ==
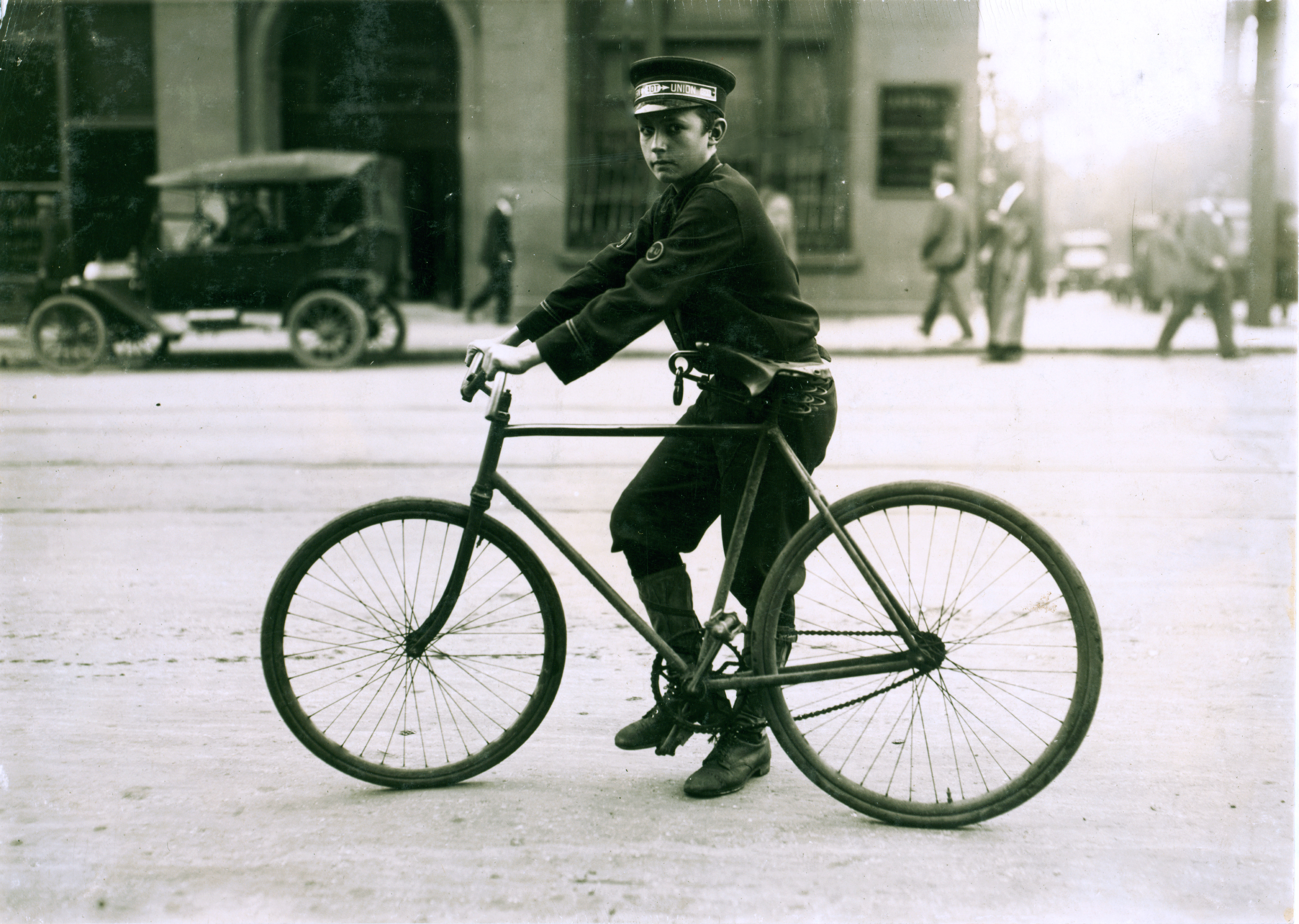
A typical bike messenger, Birmingham, Alabama, 1914

Telegraph boys were boys under the age of 18 who carried telegrams through urban streets. They were generally not union members. The job came with inherent hazards. Boys were expected to "scorch" their bicycles in urban traffic by violating traffic laws in order to reach their destinations more quickly. At night, the boys might be required to enter the red light districts in connection with their job duties.

== In Israel ==
As of October 2023, Israel Post still offered a domestic telegram service via its website.

== Notable telegram boys ==
- Frank McCourt, author and teacher
- Ralph Reader, founder of the Scout Gang Shows
- Dave Ward, deputy leader of the Communication Workers Union
- Hyman G. Rickover, Father of the US Nuclear Navy
- Ian Pattison, writer of Rab C Nesbitt was a telegram boy in the mid-1960s
- Keith Holyoake, Prime Minister of New Zealand
- Charles Manson, serial killer
- Albert Fish, serial killer

== See also ==
- Bicycle messenger
- Cargo bike
- Child labour
- Courier
- Outline of cycling
- Package delivery
- Paperboy or papergirl
