= William Williams (Labour politician) =

British politician (1895–1963)

William Richard Williams (1 March 1895 – 11 September 1963) was a British civil servant and politician who made a particular specialism of the Post Office.

== Post Office career ==
Born in Wales to a quarryman father, Williams went to elementary schools and then to a County Secondary. He began work in 1912 as a Post Office clerk, living in Caernarfon, and became active in the Post Office Workers' Union. After rising through the union ranks, he was Assistant Secretary of the Union from 1942.

== Heston MP ==
At the 1945 general election, Williams was sponsored by his union to run as the Labour candidate in Heston and Isleworth in west London, which had been newly created in boundary changes. With the election giving Labour a landslide win, he won the seat, but he could not hold on to it at the next election in 1950. Williams established a reputation as a left-winger on some issues (voting against the continuation of National Service), but supported the Government's decision to ban Communists from work related to national security.

== Droylsden ==
He was then chosen as candidate for Droylsden in the eastern suburbs of Manchester, and was elected there in the 1951 general election. This was a much safer seat and Williams gave up his Union post in 1952 to concentrate on his Parliamentary career. Often putting questions about the Post Office and other parts of the Civil Service, he was appointed to the Speaker's Panel of Chairmen for Standing Committees where his chairmanship was much appreciated.

His constituency was again subjected to boundary changes in 1955, which Williams did his best to have delayed. Williams eventually followed most of his voters into the new Manchester Openshaw constituency.

== Speakership ==
Williams was lined up to be the Labour nominee for Speaker of the House of Commons after the 1959 general election had Labour won the election, but Labour's defeat put paid to his chances and a Conservative MP was allowed the job without opposition. From 1960, he was given a frontbench responsibility for the Post Office.

In 1962, Conservative Prime Minister Harold Macmillan approached Williams with an offer to become the Deputy Chairman of Ways and Means (second Deputy Speaker). Williams declined, and the offer itself was controversial as many Labour MPs felt that Macmillan should have consulted the Leader of the Labour Party Hugh Gaitskell rather than make the offer direct to Williams. Williams died the following year at his home in Banstead, aged 68.

Parliament of the United Kingdom
New constituency	Member of Parliament for Heston and Isleworth; 1945–1950	Succeeded by Reader Harris
Preceded by Rev. George Woods	Member of Parliament for Droylsden; 1951–1955	Constituency abolished
New constituency	Member of Parliament for Manchester Openshaw; 1955–1963	Succeeded by Charles Morris
