= 1955 Gateshead West by-election =

UK Parliamentary by-election

The 1955 Gateshead West by-election of 7 December 1955 was held after the death of Labour MP John Hall:

The seat had been won by Labour at the 1955 United Kingdom general election by over 10,000 votes

== Candidates ==
- Labour chose Harry Randall who had been the Member of Parliament for Clitheroe between 1945 and 1950.

== Result of the previous general election ==
General election 1955: Gateshead West
Party	Candidate	Votes	%	±%
Labour	John Hall	22,040	65.32	
Conservative	J Quigley	11,071	34.68	
Majority		10,339	30.64	
Turnout		33,111		
Labour hold		Swing		

== Result of the by-election ==
The Labour Party held the seat.

By-election 1955: Gateshead
Party	Candidate	Votes	%	±%
Labour	Harry Randall	13,196	66.46	+1.14
Conservative	David A Wright	6,661	33.54	−1.14
Majority		6,535	32.92	+2.28
Turnout		19,857		
Labour hold		Swing		
