= 1963 Manchester Openshaw by-election =

UK Parliamentary by-election

The 1963 Manchester Openshaw by-election was held on 5 December 1963. It was held due to the death of the incumbent Labour MP, W. R. Williams. The by-election was won by the Labour candidate Charles Morris.

Manchester Openshaw by-election, 1963
Party	Candidate	Votes	%	±%
Labour	Charles Morris	16,101	65.9	+5.7
Conservative	Gerald Fitzsimmons	7,139	29.2	−10.6
Communist	Eddie Marsden	1,185	4.9	New
Majority		8,962	36.7	+16.4
Turnout		24,425		
Labour hold		Swing		
