= Eddie Marsden =

British trade union leader (1913–1975)

Edwin Marsden (26 April 1913 – 30 August 1975) was a British trade union leader, communist activist, and political candidate.

== Biography ==
Eddie Marsden was born in the Openshaw area of Manchester. He was raised in a working-class family with four brothers and three sisters. He trained as a draughtsman but instead became a steel erector. In 1935 he joined the Communist Party of Great Britain (CPGB). Marsden was said to have been radicalised in opposition to the spread of fascism, as evidenced by the Italian invasion of Abyssinia. In the 1930s he also joined the Constructional Engineering Union (CEU), and was a site steward for more than thirty years.

In 1952, Marsden was elected to the executive of the CEU, representing the region of North West England. In 1962 he became the region's full-time organiser, also representing the union on the executive of the Confederation of Shipbuilding and Engineering Unions. Meanwhile, he was increasingly active in the CPGB, serving on its Lancashire and Cheshire District Committee. In 1968 he was elected to the party's Executive Committee. He stood as the Communist candidate in the December 1963 Manchester Openshaw by-election, receiving 4.9% of the vote. He stood again unsuccessfully for the seat in the 1964 and 1966 general elections.

Marsden was elected as general secretary of the CEU in 1968. Three years later the CEU became part of the Amalgamated Union of Engineering Workers (AUEW), albeit remaining largely autonomous, with Marsden continuing as general secretary of the AUEW's newly formed Construction Section. He also played a significant role within the Trades Union Congress, which raised his public profile.

Eddie Marsden died in August 1975, while still holding his AUEW post.

Trade union offices
Preceded by Ernie Patterson	General Secretary of the Constructional Engineering Union; 1968–1971	Succeeded by Position abolished
Preceded by New position	General Secretary of the Amalgamated Union of Engineering Workers (Construction Section); 1971–1975	Succeeded by John Baldwin
