= Paul Farrelly =

British politician (born 1962)

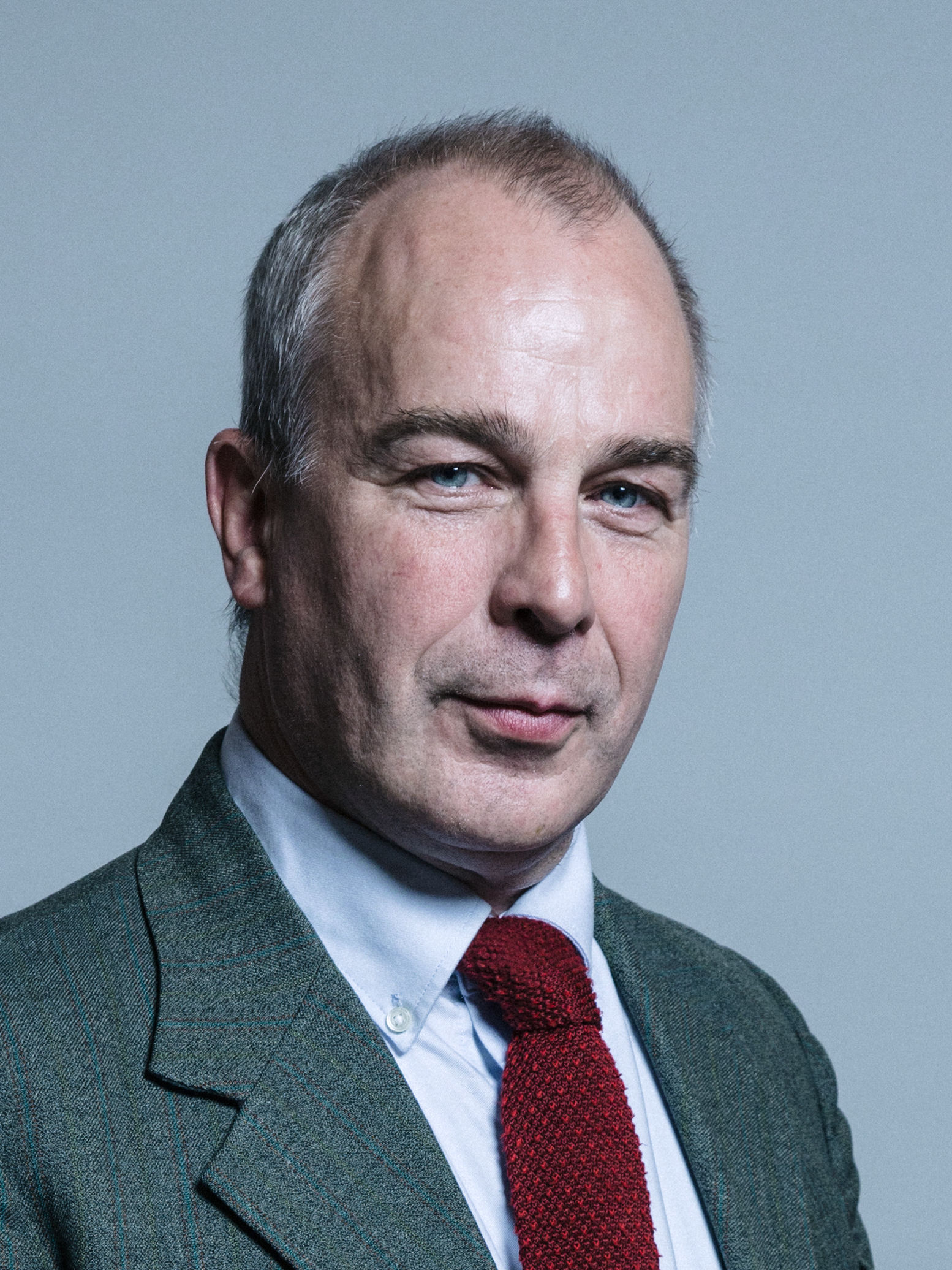
- Official portrait, 2017

Member of Parliament for Newcastle-under-Lyme
- In office 7 June 2001 – 6 November 2019
- Preceded by: Llin Golding
- Succeeded by: Aaron Bell

Personal details
- Born: Christopher Paul Farrelly; 2 March 1962 (age 64) Newcastle-under-Lyme, Staffordshire, England
- Party: Labour
- Education: St Edmund Hall, Oxford
- Website: www.paulfarrelly.com

Christopher Paul Farrelly (born 2 March 1962) is a British Labour Party politician, banker and journalist, who was the Member of Parliament (MP) for Newcastle-under-Lyme from 2001 to 2019.

== Early life ==
Farrelly was born in Newcastle-under-Lyme, Staffordshire. Farrelly was educated at Wolstanton Grammar School (which later became Marshlands Comprehensive High School) on Milehouse Lane in Newcastle-under-Lyme. He studied at St Edmund Hall, Oxford on a scholarship where he graduated with a BA in Philosophy, Politics and Economics in 1984. After his education, he worked at managerial level in the corporate finance department with Barclays de Zoete Wedd, and, in 1990 joined Reuters as a correspondent and news editor. He was appointed as the deputy business editor with the Independent on Sunday in 1995 before joining The Observer in 1997 as the City Editor, where he remained until his election to Westminster.

== Parliamentary career ==
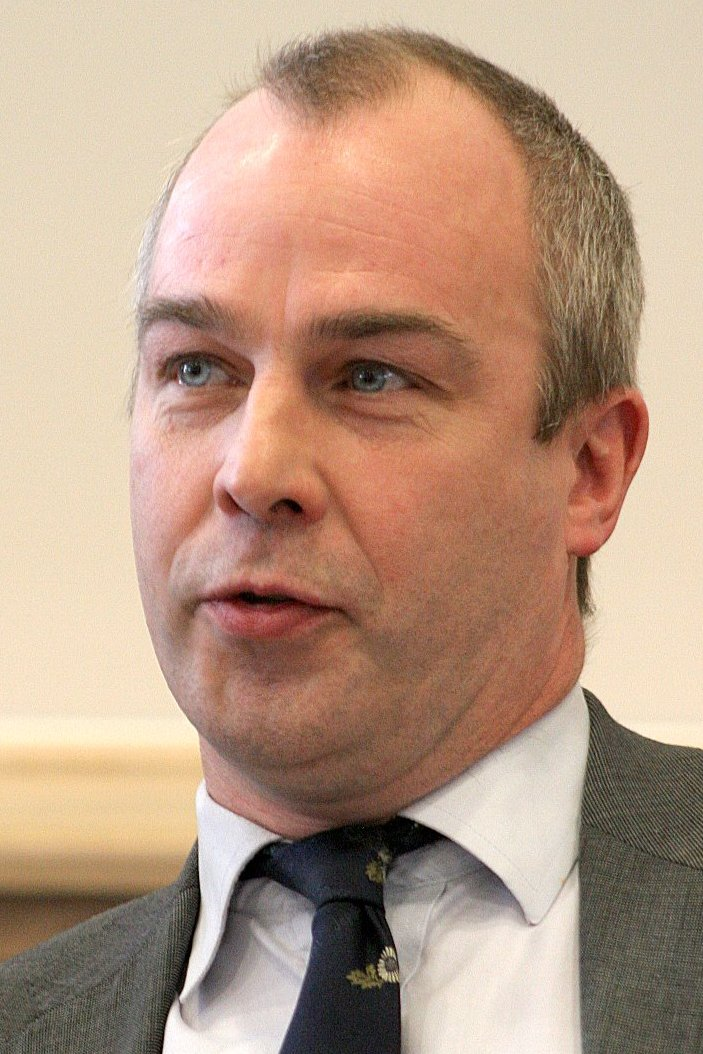
Farrelly in 2010

Before his election, Farrelly held elected office within the Hornsey and Wood Green Constituency Labour Party as well as in Newcastle-under-Lyme. He unsuccessfully contested Chesham and Amersham at the 1997 general election, finishing in third place.

Farrelly was selected to contest his hometown seat of Newcastle-under-Lyme following the retirement of the Labour MP Llin Golding at the 2001 general election, and he held the seat comfortably with a majority of 9,986. He made his maiden speech on 12 July 2001. In the House of Commons, he served on several select committees: the Joint Committee on Consolidation Bills from 2001 to 2015, the Science and Technology Select Committee from 2003 to 2005, the Joint Committee on Privacy and Injunctions from 2011 to 2012, and the Culture, Media and Sport Select Committee from 2017 to 2019.

A written Parliamentary question by Farrelly, answered on 19 October 2009, became the subject of debate, as The Guardian newspaper was prevented from reporting on it by a super-injunction.

At the 2010 general election, Farrelly was returned to parliament with a majority of 1,552. On 4 November 2010, he was involved in a physical altercation with a man during an event at the Houses of Parliament Sports and Social club, which Farrelly later said he was acting in self-defence.

Farrelly was re-elected in 2015 with a majority of 650. He supported Owen Smith in the failed attempt to replace Jeremy Corbyn in the 2016 Labour Party leadership election.

Farrelly was one of 47 Labour MPs who defied the party whip to vote against the European Union (Notification of Withdrawal) Act 2017. The Act allowed the government to invoke Article 50, triggering the beginning of the process of British withdrawal from the European Union. Farrelly was one of 13 MPs to vote against triggering the 2017 general election. In the ensuing election, he retained his seat by just 30 votes. There was confusion in the constituency on polling day, where thousands of students were initially rejected due to errors with the electoral register.

In November 2017, the Mail on Sunday reported that Farrelly “launched a foul-mouthed tirade” at fellow Labour MP James Frith. Labour said it would be launching an investigation after it received "a number of complaints". Farrelly denied the claims.

In March 2018, Farrelly was accused of bullying by the former clerk of the Digital, Culture, Media and Sport Committee along with two other clerks regarding his conduct to them. An internal report into his conduct found his behaviour amounted to “an abuse of power or position, unfair treatment and undermining a competent worker by constant criticism”. A formal inquiry into the allegations was blocked by MPs and Farrelly called the accusations 'baseless'.

In March 2018, the Parliamentary Commissioner for Standards found Farrelly broke the House of Commons code of conduct by using Commons stationery during his election campaign, sending out 1000 canvassing letters in the run up to the election as if they had been sent by the House. Farrelly issued an apology and paid back the cost of the stationery.

Farrelly stood down from Parliament at the 2019 United Kingdom general election.

Parliament of the United Kingdom
Preceded by Llin Golding	Member of Parliament for Newcastle-under-Lyme; 2001–2019	Succeeded by Aaron Bell
