= Droylsden (constituency) =

Parliamentary constituency in the United Kingdom, 1950–1955

- Former borough constituency for the House of Commons

1950–1955
- Seats: one
- Created from: Mossley
- Replaced by: Manchester Gorton, Manchester Openshaw and Ashton-under-Lyne

Droylsden was a parliamentary constituency in the historic county of Lancashire in the North West of England. It returned one Member of Parliament (MP) to the House of Commons of the Parliament of the United Kingdom, elected by the first past the post system.

== History ==
The constituency was created for the 1950 general election, and abolished for the 1955 general election. Before 1950 the area had formed part of the Mossley constituency.

The former MP for Mossley, the Rev. G.S. Woods, was elected as a Labour Co-operative member in the first election for this constituency in 1950. He sat in Parliament until he died, shortly before the 1951 election. A new Labour MP, W.R. Williams, was elected in 1951 and represented the seat for the rest of its existence.

== Boundaries ==
The constituency was formed by combining four Urban Districts, situated to the north east of Manchester. They were Audenshaw, Denton, Droylsden, and Failsworth.

In 1955 the constituency was abolished. Audenshaw and Denton became part of Manchester Gorton constituency. Failsworth was attached to the division of Manchester Openshaw. Droylsden became part of the Ashton-under-Lyne constituency, which in the 1955 redistribution extended west to the borders of Manchester.

== Members of Parliament ==
Election	Member	Party
1950	George Savile Woods ^{a}	Labour Co-operative
1951	William Williams	Labour
1955	constituency abolished	

Note:-

- ^{a} Seat vacant at dissolution, following the death of Woods on 9 July 1951.

== Elections ==
=== Elections in the 1950s ===
General election 1950: Droylsden
Party	Candidate	Votes	%	±%
Labour Co-op	George Woods	25,238	48.7	
Conservative	Eric Johnson	21,102	40.7	
Liberal	Herbert Kevin-Armitage	5,483	10.6	
Majority		4,136	8.0	
Turnout		51,823	87.7	
Registered electors		59,077		
Labour Co-op win (new seat)				

- Seat vacant on dissolution - death

General election 1951: Droylsden
Party	Candidate	Votes	%	±%
Labour	William Williams	26,829	51.8	+3.1
Conservative	William Howard	24,959	48.2	+7.5
Majority		1,870	3.6	−4.4
Turnout		51,788	86.6	−1.1
Registered electors		59,772		
Labour hold		Swing	+5.3	

- Swing from Labour to Conservative
- Constituency abolished (1955)
