= Tony Clarke, Baron Clarke of Hampstead =

English trade unionist and Labour Party politician (born 1932)

The Right Honourable The Lord Clarke of Hampstead CBE
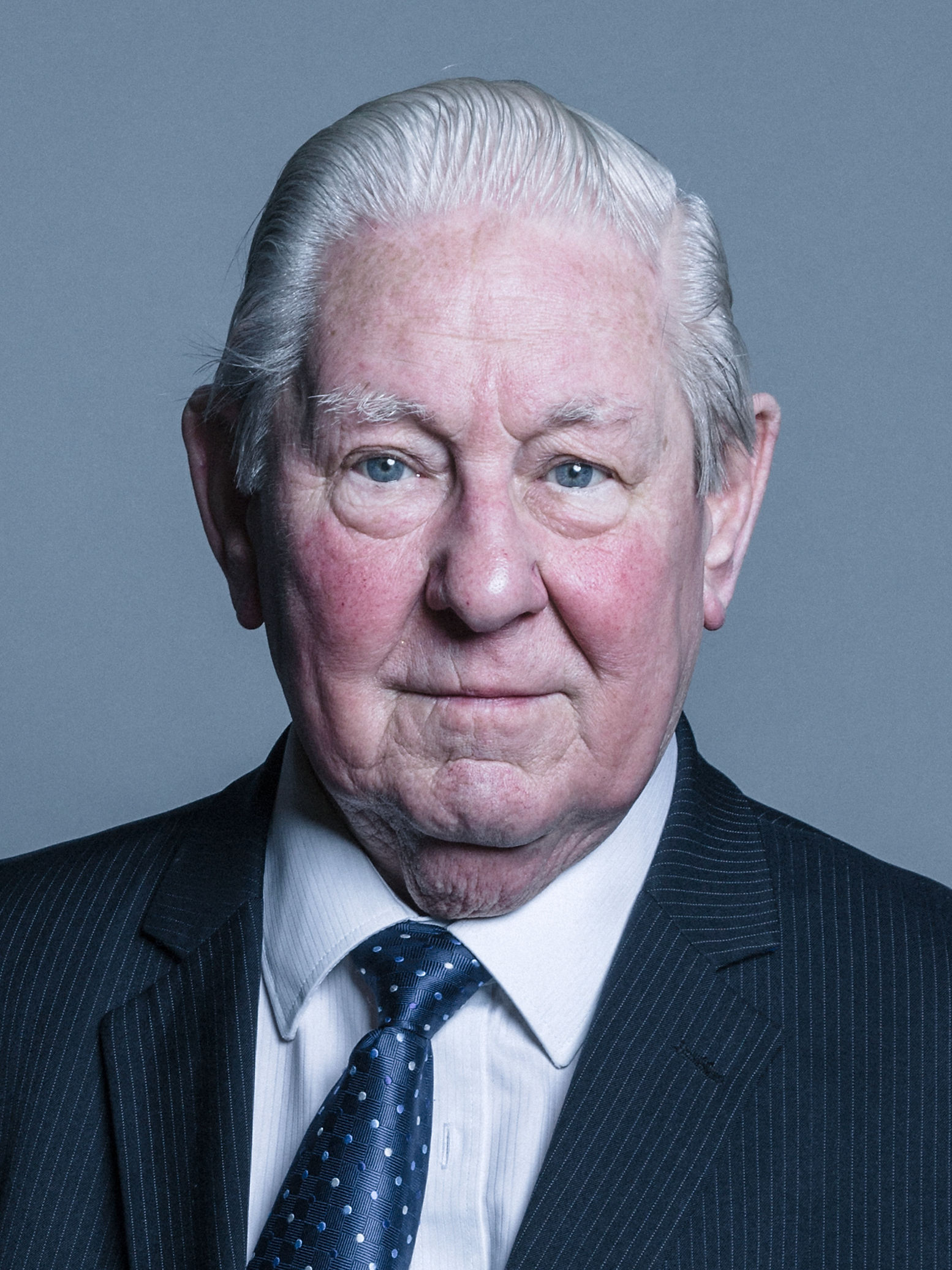
- Official portrait, 2017

Member of the House of Lords
- Lord Temporal
- Life peerage 29 July 1998 – 17 April 2026

Personal details
- Born: Anthony James Clarke; 17 April 1932 (age 94)
- Party: Labour

Anthony James Clarke, Baron Clarke of Hampstead, CBE (born 17 April 1932) is an English trade unionist and Labour Party politician.

A former telegraph boy and postman, in 1979 Clarke became a full-time official of the Union of Postal Workers, which in 1980 became the Union of Communication Workers (UCW). He edited the UPW journal The Post in 1979, and served as the UCW's Deputy General Secretary from 1981 to 1993.

Clarke stood as a Labour Parliamentary candidate for Hampstead in the February and October 1974 general elections, losing both times to Geoffrey Finsberg. Clarke was a member of the Labour Party's National Executive Committee from 1983 to 1993, and served as Chairman of the Labour Party from 1992 to 1993.

Clarke was appointed a Commander of the Order of the British Empire (CBE) in the 1998 New Year Honours. He was created a life peer on 29 July 1998, as Baron Clarke of Hampstead, of Hampstead in the London Borough of Camden. He chaired the Taskforce established to investigate the causes of the disturbances in Burnley in 2001. After a period of being on leave of absence he returned to the Lords in April 2022.

Political offices
Preceded by John Evans	Chair of the Labour Party; 1992–1993	Succeeded by David Blunkett
Trade union offices
Preceded by Alan Tuffin	Deputy General Secretary of the Union of Communication Workers; 1982–1993	Succeeded by Derek Hodgson
Orders of precedence in the United Kingdom
Preceded by The Lord Warner	Gentlemen; Baron Clarke of Hampstead	Followed by The Lord Norton of Louth
