= Harry Randall (British politician) =

British politician (1899–1976)

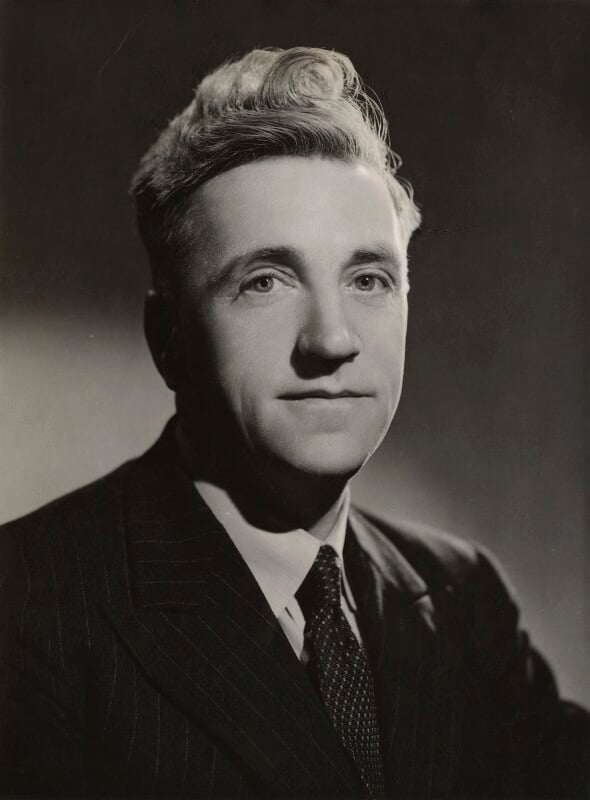
Randall in 1947

Harry Enos Randall OBE (31 December 1899 – 28 August 1976) was a British Labour Party politician. He was Member of Parliament (MP) for Clitheroe from 1945 to 1950 and Gateshead West from 1955 until his retirement in 1970 (having unsuccessfully fought Mitcham in 1951).

He was a British delegate to the Council of Europe and Western European Union from 1958 to 1960 and United Kingdom Representative on the Executive Committee, United Nations High Commission Programme for Refugees from 1965 to 1970. Later he was on the Standing Conference of British Organisations for Aid to Refugees, being Chairman of the European Committee from 1970 to 1973. He was appointed an OBE in 1972. He married in 1925 Rose Nellie, daughter of Joseph Nicholson. They had one son and two daughters.

Parliament of the United Kingdom
Preceded by Sir William Brass	Member of Parliament for Clitheroe; 1945–1950	Succeeded by Richard Fort
Preceded by John Thomas Hall	Member of Parliament for Gateshead West; 1955–1970	Succeeded by John Horam
