= 1969 Newcastle-under-Lyme by-election =

UK parliamentary by-election

The 1969 Newcastle-under-Lyme by-election of 30 October 1969 was caused by the death of Labour MP Stephen Swingler in February of that year. It was held on the same day as four other by-elections (in Glasgow Gorbals, Islington North, Paddington North, and Swindon) and the seat was retained by Labour.

== Result ==
Newcastle-under-Lyme by-election, 1969
Party	Candidate	Votes	%	±%
Labour	John Golding	21,786	46.13	−15.67
Conservative	Nicholas Winterton	20,744	43.92	+5.72
Liberal	David Spreckley	2,999	6.35	New
Democratic Party	D Parker	1,699	3.60	New
Majority		1,042	2.21	−21.40
Turnout		47,228	72.3	−7.6
Labour hold		Swing		

== Aftermath ==
Although the Conservatives achieved a 10.7% swing from Labour, John Golding claimed that his victory was a vote of confidence in Harold Wilson's Government. Conservative supporters responded by shouting "Rubbish", while their unsuccessful candidate, Nicholas Winterton, stated the result was notice for the Government "to quit - and soon". The other three by-elections in England held on the same day also saw similar large swings to the Conservatives, with Swindon being gained by the latter party.
