= National Communications Union =

Former trade union of the United Kingdom

- Predecessor: Post Office Engineering Union
- Merged into: Communication Workers Union
- Founded: 16 February 1985
- Dissolved: January 1995
- Headquarters: Greystoke House, 150 Brunswick Road, London
- Location: United Kingdom
- Members: 155,000 (1990)
- Affiliations: TUC, Labour

The National Communications Union (NCU) was a trade union in the United Kingdom.

The union was founded in 1985 when the Post Office Engineering Union and the Postal and Telecommunications Group of the Civil and Public Services Association merged. In 1995, it merged with the Union of Communication Workers to form the Communication Workers Union.

== General secretaries ==
1985: Bryan Stanley
1986: John Golding
1989: Anthony Young
