= Charles Smith =

Charles or Charlie Smith may refer to:

== Academics ==
- C. Alphonso Smith (1864–1924), American professor, college dean, philologist, and folklorist
- Charles Emrys Smith, British economist, educator, Swansea Metropolitan University / University of Wales
- Charles Roach Smith (1806–1890), founding member of the British Archaeological Association
- Charles Saumarez Smith (born 1954), British art historian
- Charles Smith (topographer) (1715–1763), Irish topographer and writer
- Charles Sprague Smith (1853–1910), founder and director of the People's Institute
- Charles Piper Smith (1877–1955), American botanist
- Charles Smith (mathematician) (1844–1916), British academic
- Charles Forster Smith (1852–1931), American classical philologist

== Arts and entertainment ==
- Bubba Smith (Charles Aaron Smith, 1945–2011), American actor and football player
- Charles A. Smith (architect) (1866–1948), American architect
- Charles Alexander Smith (1864–1915), Canadian painter from Ontario
- Charles Martin Smith (born 1953), American actor and director
- Charles Patrick Smith (1877–1963), Australian journalist
- Charles Smith (actor) (1920–1988), American actor
- Charles Smith (artist) (1749–1824), Scottish artist
- Charles Smith (singer) (1786–1856), English tenor and bass, organist and composer
- Charles Smith (songwriter), American record producer and songwriter
- Charlie Smith (musician, born 1979), American jazz musician
- Charlie Smith (drummer) (1927–1966), American jazz drummer
- Charlie Smith (footballer) (1915–1984), Welsh footballer
- Charlie Smith (American poet) (born 1947), American poet and novelist
- Charlie Smith (Romani poet) (1956–2005), British poet and politician
- Charles Smith (playwright), American playwright and educator
- Charles Edward Smith (jazz) (1904–1970), American jazz author and critic
- Charles Harriott Smith (1792–1864), English sculptor
- Charles Raymond Smith (1798–1888), English sculptor
- Dr. Charles Smith (born 1940), artist and activist
- Chas Smith (Charles Vincent Smith, 1957–2007), American author, musician and Cleveland State University music instructor

== Military ==
- Charles Kingsford Smith (1897–1935), Australian aviator in WWI and afterwards
- Charles Aitchison Smith (1871–1940), Indian army officer and administrator
- Charles Douglass Smith (c. 1761–1855), British army officer and colonial administrator
- Charles Hamilton Smith (1776–1859), British artist, soldier and spy
- Charles Felix Smith (1786–1858), British army officer
- Charles Bean Smith, later Sir Charles Euan-Smith (1842–1910), British soldier and diplomat
- Charles Bradford Smith (1916–2004), American army officer and Silver Star recipient
- Charles Ferguson Smith (1807–1862), Union general of the American Civil War
- Charles Henry Smith (Navy Medal of Honor) (1826–1898), American Civil War sailor and Medal of Honor recipient
- Charles Henry Smith (Army Medal of Honor) (1827–1902), American Civil War officer and Medal of Honor recipient

== Politics ==
=== Australia ===
- Charles Throsby Smith (1798–1876), Australian explorer and mayor
- Charles Smith (Victorian politician) (1833–1903), member of the Victorian Legislative Assembly 1883–1892
- Charles Smith (Western Australian politician) (born 1970), member of the Western Australian Legislative Council from 2017

=== Canada ===
- Charles A. Smith (Canadian politician) (1845–?), Canadian merchant and political figure in Nova Scotia
- Charles L. Smith (Canadian politician) (1853–?), Canadian politician in New Brunswick
- Charles Napier Smith (1866–1919), Canadian politician in Ontario
- Charles Rhodes Smith (1896–1993), Canadian politician in Manitoba

=== United Kingdom ===
- C. A. Smith (1895–?), British socialist and anti-communist activist
- Charles Culling Smith (1775–1853), British politician and courtier
- Charles Harding Smith (1931–1997), loyalist leader in Northern Ireland
- Charles Smith (MP) (1756–1814), British politician, member of parliament

=== United States ===
- Charles Aurelius Smith (1861–1916), governor of South Carolina
- Charles Bennett Smith (1870–1939), U.S. representative from New York
- Charles Brooks Smith (1844–1899), U.S. representative from West Virginia
- Charles C. Smith (Virginia politician), mayor of Newport News, Virginia, 1924–1926
- Charles C. Smith (Pennsylvania politician) (1908–1970), American representative from Pennsylvania
- Charles Emory Smith (1842–1908), American journalist and politician
- Charles F. Smith (politician) (1912–1962), member of the Arkansas House of Representatives
- Charles F. Smith Jr. (1918–2001), American politician in Wisconsin senate
- Charles Henry Smith (1826–1903), American politician in Georgia senate and writer under the nom de plume Bill Arp
- Charles H. Smith (Wisconsin politician) (1863–1915), Wisconsin state legislator
- Charles K. Smith (1799–1866), American politician, lawyer, and first secretary of Minnesota Territory
- Charles L. Smith (Seattle politician) (1892–1982), mayor of Seattle, Washington
- Charles Lynwood Smith Jr. (born 1943), U.S. federal judge
- Charles Manley Smith (1868–1937), governor of Vermont, 1935–37
- Charles P. Smith (politician) (1926–2014), Wisconsin state treasurer
- Charles P. Smith (judge) (1878–1948), US Tax Court judge
- Charles Plympton Smith (born 1954), American banker and former member of the Vermont House of Representatives
- Charles Sydney Smith (mayor) (1828–1907), jeweler and mayor of Providence, Rhode Island
- Charles Z. Smith (1927–2016), Washington State Supreme Court justice
- Charles Wallace Smith (1864–1939), speaker of the Michigan House of Representatives
- Charlie Smith (Louisiana lobbyist) (1942–2012), American lobbyist
- Charles Smith (North Carolina politician), member of the North Carolina House of Representatives

=== Other uses in politics ===
- Charles Abercrombie Smith (1834–1919), scientist, politician and civil servant of the Cape Colony
- Robert Smith (colonial administrator) (Charles Robert Smith, 1887–1959), British colonial administrator and governor of North Borneo

== Science and technology ==
- Charles H. Smith (historian) (born 1950), American historian of science
- Charles Smith (pathologist), Canadian forensic pathologist reprimanded for his evidence in shaken baby cases since 1992
- Charles Michie Smith (1854–1922), Scottish astronomer
- Charles Johnston Smith (1880–1943), British surgeon

== Sports ==
=== American football ===
- Charles H. Smith (American football) (active 1883–1894), American football center
- Charles Smith (American football) (1924–2013), American football back
- Charlie Smith (tackle) (1889–1961), American football tackle
- Charlie Smith (running back) (born 1946), American football running back
- Charlie Smith (wide receiver) (born 1950), American football wide receiver
- Bubba Smith (Charles Aaron Smith, 1945–2011), American football defensive end and actor

=== Baseball ===
- Charles R. Smith (coach) (died 1969), American baseball and basketball coach
- Charley Smith (1937–1994), American MLB third baseman
- Charlie Smith (pitcher) (1880–1929), American MLB pitcher
- Charley Smith (infielder) (1840–1897), American MLB infielder
- Chino Smith (Charles Smith, 1903–1932), Negro league baseball player
- Pop Smith (Charles Marv Smith, 1856–1927), Canadian MLB infielder, 1880–1891
- Red Smith (pitcher) (Charles Smith), American Negro league baseball player

=== Basketball ===
- Charles Smith (basketball, born 1965), University of Pittsburgh and New York Knicks
- Charles Smith (basketball, born 1967), Georgetown University and Boston Celtics
- Charles Smith (basketball, born August 1975), University of New Mexico and Portland Trail Blazers
- Charles Smith (basketball, born October 1975), American-English basketball player
- Charles Smith (basketball coach) (born 1949), American high school basketball coach

=== Cricket ===
- Sir C. Aubrey Smith (1863–1948), English actor and cricketer
- Charles Smith (cricketer, born 1879) (1879–1949), English cricketer
- Charlie Smith (South African cricketer) (1872–1947), South African cricketer
- Charles Smith (cricketer, born 1861) (1861–1925), English cricketer
- Charles Smith (cricketer, born 1864) (1864–1920), New Zealand cricketer and administrator
- Charles Smith (cricketer, born 1849) (1849–1930), English cricketer
- Charles Smith (South African cricketer) (1905–1967), South African cricketer
- Charlie Smith (English cricketer) (1859–1942), English cricketer
- Charles Smith (cricketer, born 1838) (1838–1909), English cricketer
- Charles Smith (cricketer, born 1898) (1898–1955), English cricketer

=== Other sports ===
- Charles Smith (sailor) (1889–1969), American sailor who competed in the 1932 Summer Olympics
- Charles Sydney Smith (1876–1951), British three times Olympic water polo champion
- Charles Eastlake Smith (1850–1917), British football player
- Charles Smith (polo) (active 1972–1981), American polo player
- Charles Smith (rugby) (1909–1976), New Zealand rugby football player
- Charles C. Smith (boxer) (1860–1924), African American boxer
- Charles Smith (Australian footballer) (1901–1968), Australian footballer
- Charles Smith (English footballer)
- Charlie Smith (golfer) (1931–2011), American golfer

== Other people ==
- Charles Smith (cowboy) ("Hairlip" Charlie Smith; 1844–1907), frontiersman and lawman in the Old West, member of Wyatt Earp's posse
- Charles Lee Smith (1887–1964), American atheist activist
- Charlie Smith (centenarian) (1874–1979), claimed to be the oldest person in the US
- Charles Pressley Smith (1862–1935), Anglican priest
- Charles John Smith (1803–1838), English engraver
- Charles Rattray Smith (1859–1941), schoolteacher in Britain and New South Wales, Australia
- Charles Smith (developer) (1901–1995), American real estate developer and philanthropist in the Washington DC area
- Charles Smith (priest), English Anglican priest
- Charles Spencer Smith (1852–1923), American bishop in the African Methodist Episcopal church
- Charles Edward Smith (Baptist) (1835–1929), American author and Baptist ecclesiologist and apologist
- Charles R. Smith, head of the Menasha Wooden Ware Co., who named Ladysmith, Wisconsin, after his wife
- Charles "Chip" Smith, an alias of German murderer Christian Gerhartsreiter
- Charles Howard Smith (1888–1942), British diplomat
- Charles Howard Smith (trade unionist) (1875–1965), British trade union leader
- Charles Loraine Smith (1751–1835), sportsman, artist and politician
- J. Charles Smith III (born 1964), American prosecutor in Frederick County, Maryland

== Fictional characters ==
- Charles Smith, a character in the video game Red Dead Redemption 2
- Charlie Smith, a character in the television series Class

== Other uses ==
- Charles E. Smith Co.
- Chuck Smith (disambiguation)
- Charles Smyth (disambiguation)
