= Charles E. Smith =

Charles E. Smith may refer to:

- Charles Eastlake Smith (1850–1917), British football player
- Charles Edward Smith (jazz) (1904–1970), American jazz author and critic
- Charles Edward Smith (Baptist) (1835–1929), American author and Baptist ecclesiologist and apologist
- Charles Edward Smith IV (born 1967), American professional NBA player and 1988 Summer Olympics bronze medalist
- Charles Emory Smith (1842–1908), American journalist and political leader
- Charles Emrys Smith (fl. 1990s–2010s), British academic, economist, educator, author
- Charles Emil Smith (1901–1995), American real estate developer and philanthropist in the Washington DC area
  - Charles E. Smith Co., established by the developer
- Charles E. Smith (sailor) (1889–1969), American sailor who competed in the 1932 Summer Olympics
- Charles E. Smith (P&R president) (1820–1900), president of the Philadelphia and Reading Railroad

== See also ==
- Charles Smith (disambiguation)
