= Aleksandar Bošković =

Macedonian anthropologist (born 1962)

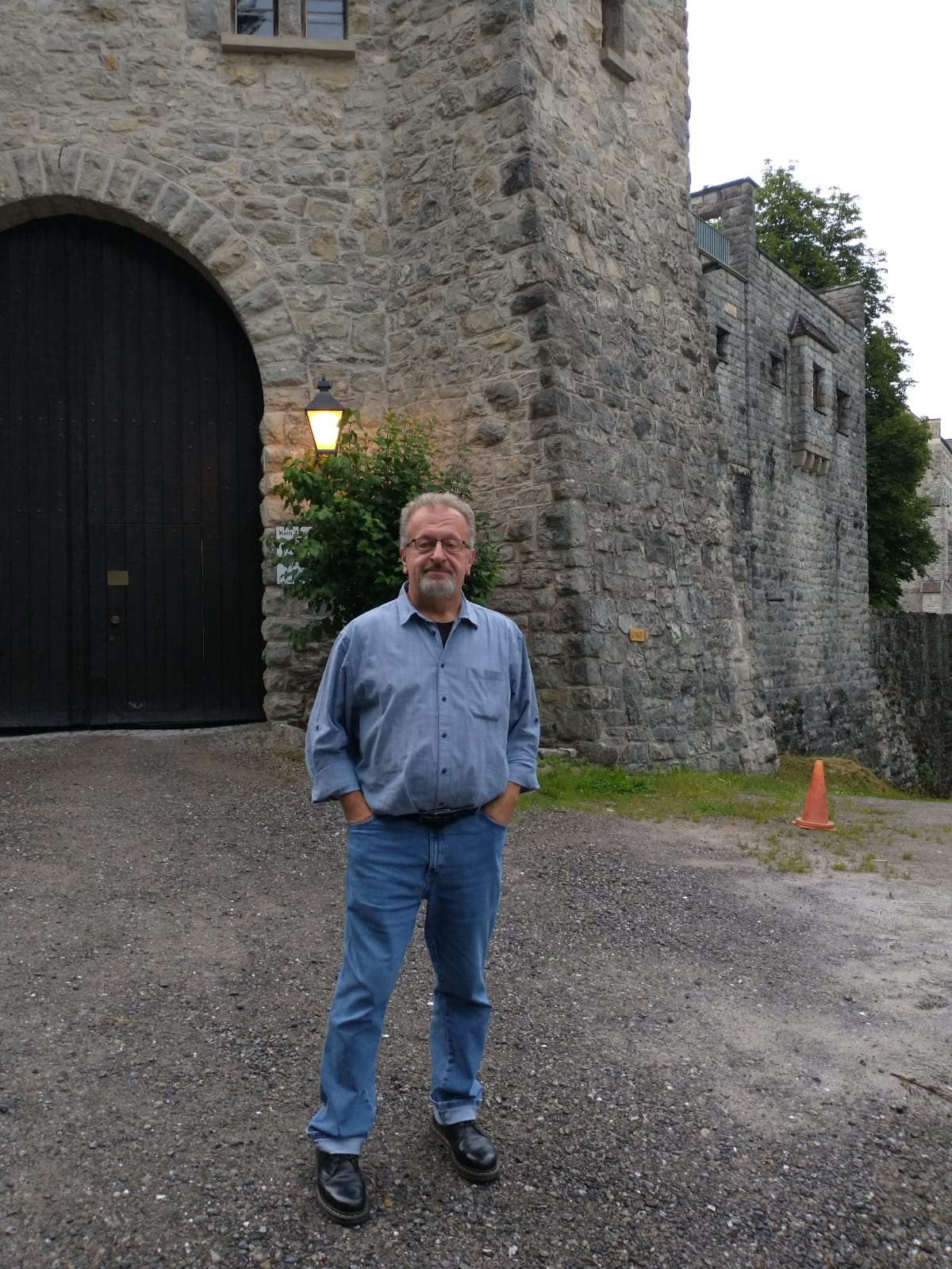
- Bošković in 2021
- Born: 5 June 1962 (age 64); Zemun, FPR Yugoslavia
- Education: University of St Andrews
- Scientific career
- Fields: Anthropology; Social anthropology; Archaeology; Sub-fields: History of anthropology; rationality; semiotics; myth; ethnicity; nationalism; psychoanalysis
- Workplaces: University of St Andrews; University of Brasília; University of the Witwatersrand; Rhodes University; Arheološki Institut / Institute of Archaeology; Jagiellonian University; Federal University of Rio Grande do Norte
- Thesis: Constructing Gender in Contemporary Anthropology (1996)
- Doctoral advisors: Ladislav Holý, Nigel Rapport

Aleksandar Bošković (born 5 June 1962) is an anthropologist with the degrees conferred by Tulane University (M.A.) and the University of St Andrews (Ph.D.). Bošković is the editor of the series "Anthropology's Ancestors," published by Berghahn Books, and a Senior Research Scientist (in Serbia referred to as Principal Research Fellow, or "naučni savetnik") at the Institute of Archaeology in Belgrade.

He wrote or edited twenty books and several hundred articles on the history and theory of anthropology, mostly from a transactionalist and comparative perspective. In 2018/19 he was a Research Fellow at the Institute for Advanced Studies (Institut d'Études Avancées) in Lyon. Between October 2024 and March 2006, he received the Ulam/NAWA fellowship on "World anthropologies", based on Polish researchers like Kazimierz Moszyński, as well as his and Malinowski's former student Józef Obrębski. For this project, Bošković was based in Kraków, at the Jagiellonian University, Institute of Ethnology and Cultural Anthropology.

Together with his colleague and economics professor John Hamman (Florida State University), Bošković organized a two-day conference about rationality, at the University of Lyon, on 10–11 April 2019. On 26 July 2024, with his late friend and colleague Thomas Hylland Eriksen, he convened a roundtable “(Dis)placements: anthropologies, histories, futures,” at the EASA conference in Barcelona.

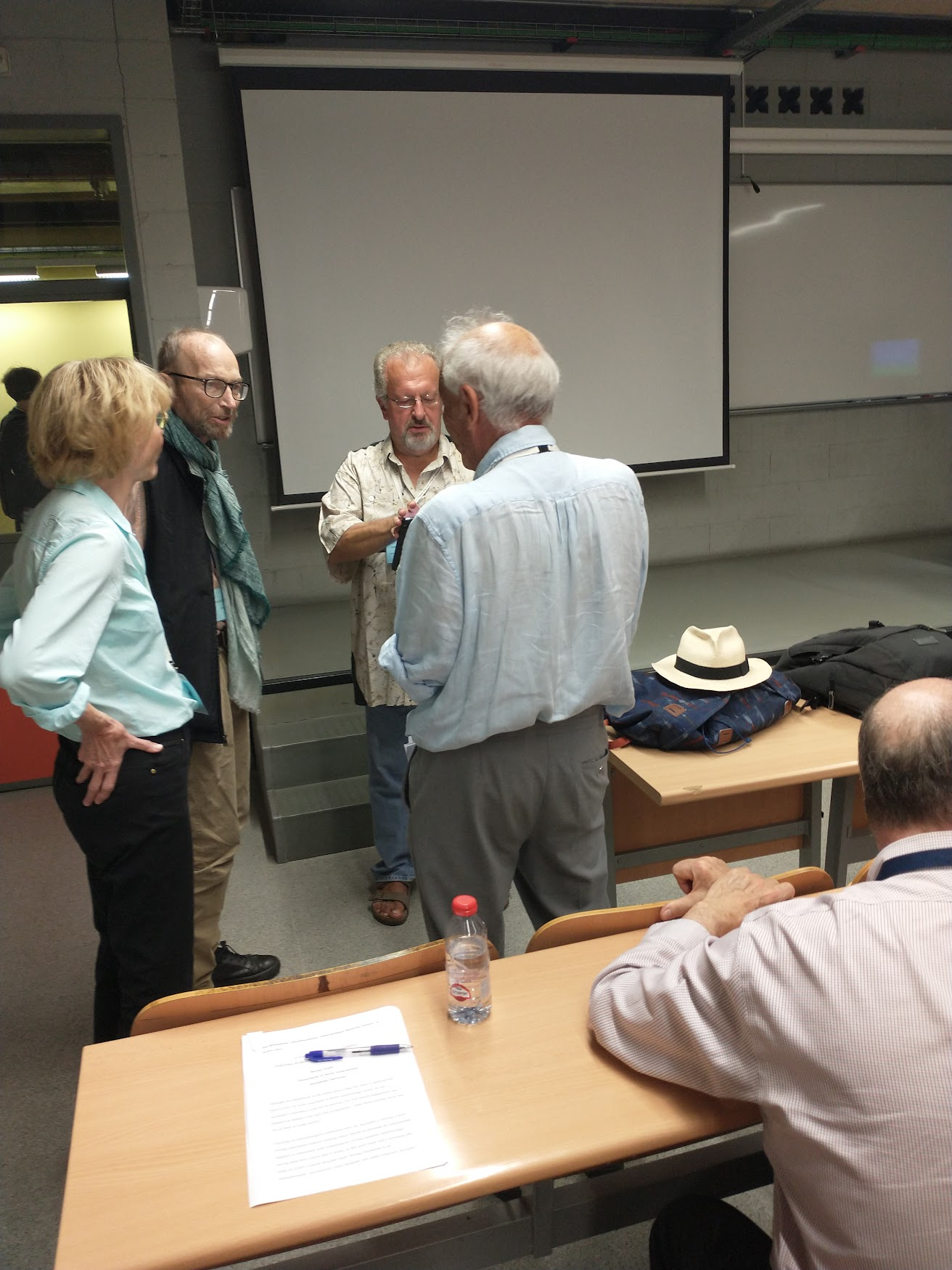
Helena Wulff, Thomas Eriksen, Adam Kuper and Aleksandar Bošković in Barcelona, 2024.

== Studies and early work ==
Born in Zemun, Aleksandar Bošković studied philosophy in Belgrade Yugoslavia. At this time, he was mostly interested in the work of the leading representative of Neo-Kantianism, Ernst Cassirer (1874–1945), especially in his concept of myth as a symbolic form. At this time he also "discovered" philosopher Paul Feyerabend (1924–1994).

His first academic publications were about of myth and religion. Major influences were Joseph Campbell (1904–1987) and Mircea Eliade (1907–1986). Aleksandar Bošković edited Dictionary of Deities and Mythic Beings of the World (in Serbo-Croatian; co-editors were Milan Vukomanović and Zoran Jovanović), a single-volume reference work with 14 contributors, covering Non-classical Mythology. He contributed over 150 entries himself, including all the entries on Australia, Mesoamerica, Africa, the Celts, and some on the Middle East and Mesopotamia (Baal, Gilgamesh, Ziusudra), and India (Ganesha, Parvati, Rudra, Shiva). Several years later, Bošković revisited some of his earlier work on myths, in the edited book in Serbo-Croatian, which included some of the important articles written by Joseph Campbell, Beatriz de la Fuente, David Grove, Mircea Eliade, David L. Miller, Milan Vukomanović, and Alan Watts.

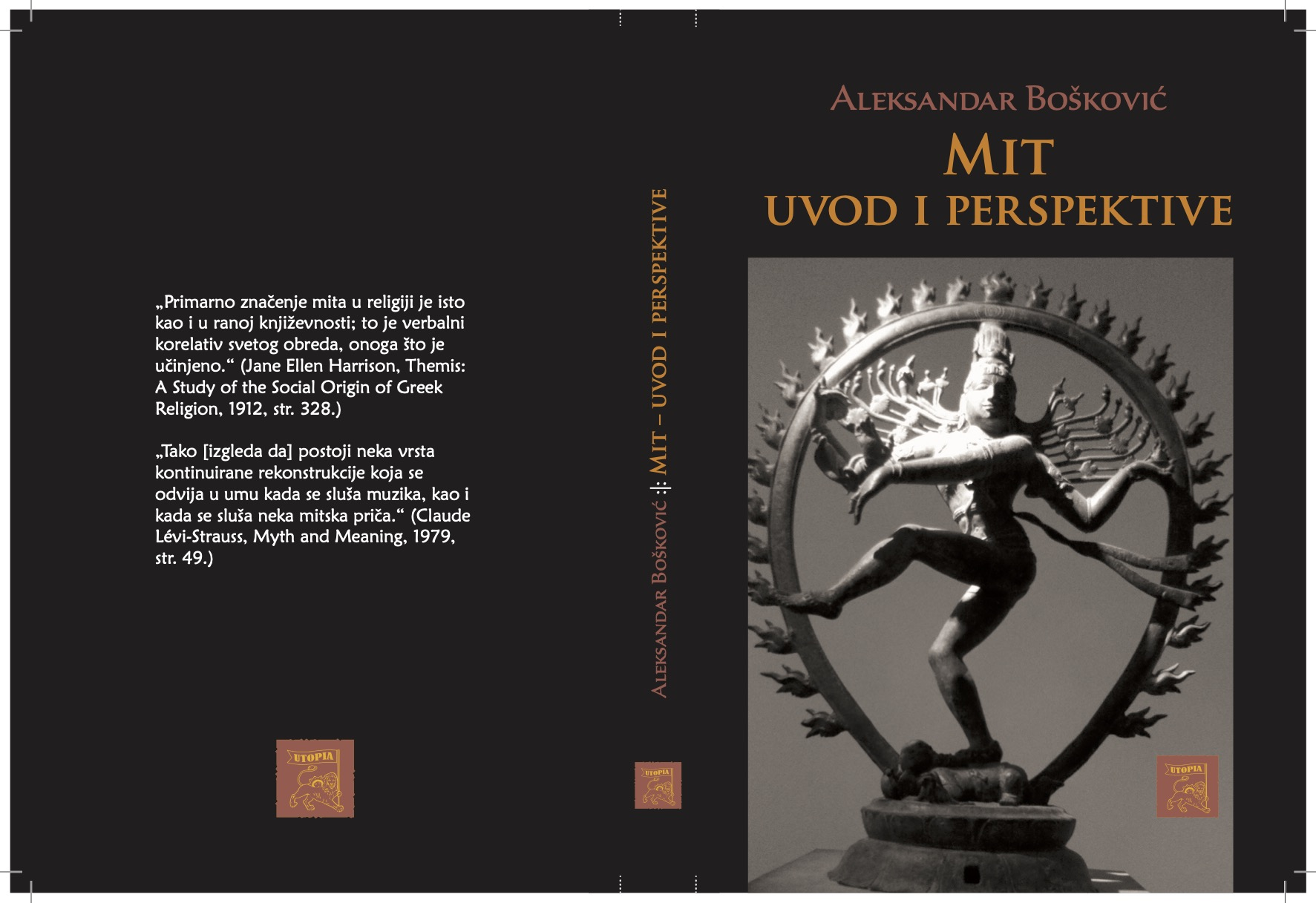
Myth: Introduction and Perspectives (Utopia, Belgrade, 2021)

Some of Bošković's works focused on ancient Mesoamerican religions (especially Classic Maya and Mexican/ Aztec). In 1990, Bošković went to Tulane University in New Orleans to study anthropology with Munro S. Edmonson [1924–2002]. His research in Guatemala in 1991 was primarily motivated by the interest in Classic Maya ceramics, but this interest gradually waned, mostly due to Bošković's dissatisfaction with the then-dominant "direct historical approach" in Mesoamerican studies and the tendency by some anthropologists to use material from looted sites. He continued to occasionally review books about Mesoamerica, especially for the journal Anthropos. Bošković kept in touch with several prominent Maya archaeologists, including Richard E. W. Adams (1931–2015), an American archaeologist who taught at the University of Texas at San Antonio, who influenced him with his general perspective and methodological rigor; as well as Claude-François Baudez (1932–2013), the leading French Mayanist at the time, from the CNRS (Centre national de la recherche scientifique). The interest in Mesoamerica was revisited in a book published by Archaeopress in 2017, Mesoamerican Religions and Archaeology. The book includes a number of review essays, including chapters on The Meaning of Maya Myths, Aztec Great Goddesses, and ways of interpreting the Codex Borbonicus (or Codex Cihuacoatl).

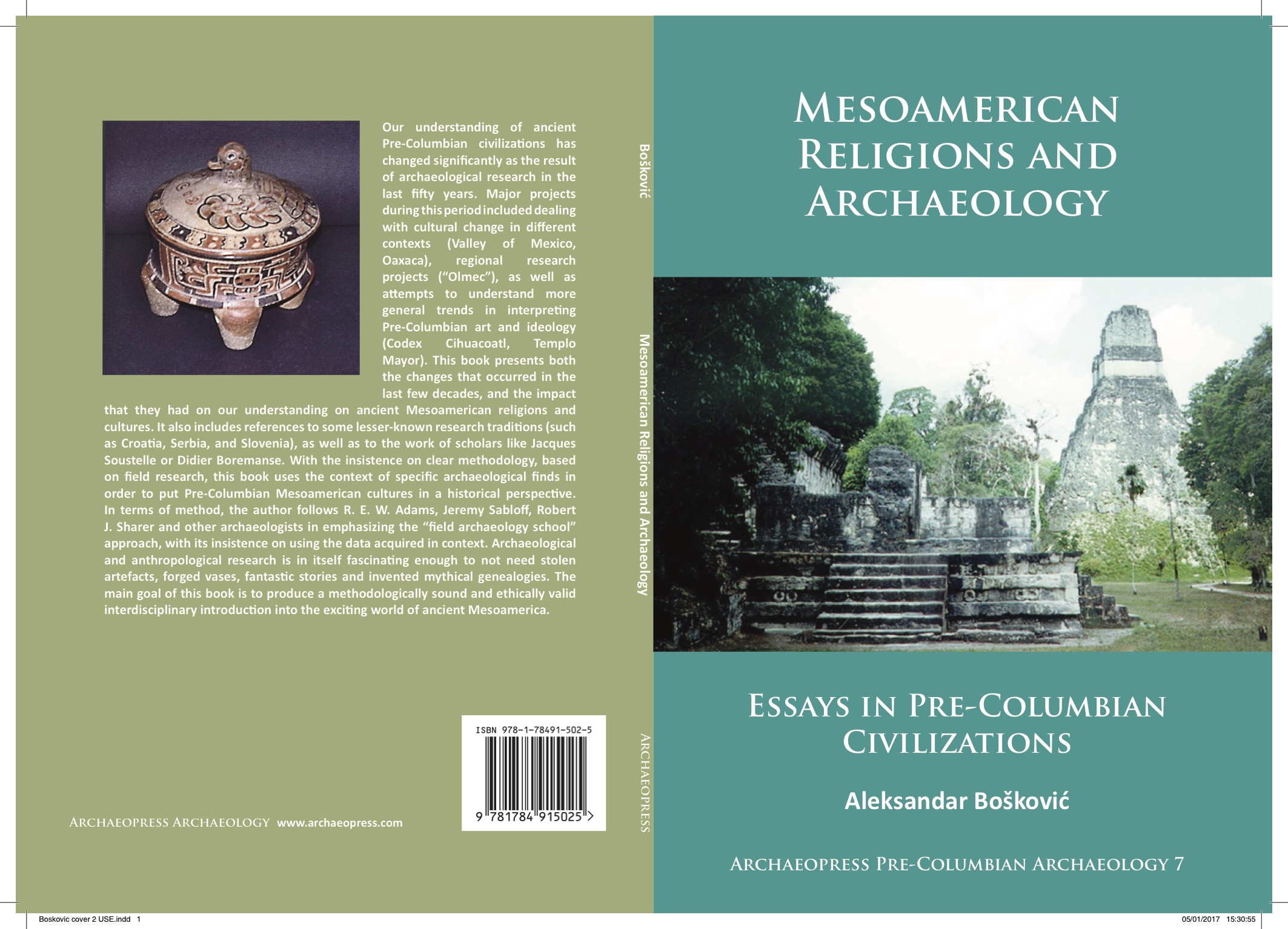
Mesoamerican Religions and Archaeology (Archaeopress, 2017).

Bošković defended his M.A. thesis (supervised by Munro S. Edmonson), "William Robertson Smith and the Anthropological Study of Myth," at Tulane University in April 1993. William Robertson Smith remained part of his interest, present in his courses on myth and religion, culminating in the biography, published by the Berghahn Books.

In September 1993 he entered the Doctoral studies program in the Department of Social Anthropology of the University of St Andrews in Scotland. This move was motivated by the interest in contemporary anthropology, combined with the interpretive approach, to which he came through the influence of Clifford Geertz (1926–2006). In St. Andrews, Aleksandar Bošković was first supervised by Ladislav Holý (1933–1997), who proved to be a major influence, with his version of methodological individualism. Following Holý's illness, Bošković was supervised by Nigel J. Rapport, and defended his Ph.D. thesis (Constructing Gender in Contemporary Anthropology) on 1 November 1996. The external examiner of the thesis was Professor Dame Henrietta Moore, and the internal examiner was Professor Joanna Overing. The ethnographic part of the thesis focused on the feminist groups in Slovenia. Methodologically, some of the conclusions were influenced by Ladislav Holý's critical interpretative approach, as well as by Marilyn Strathern's and Henrietta L. Moore's anthropology of gender – especially considering gender as a social and cultural construct.

While in St Andrews, he met a brilliant linguist in the Department of Social Anthropology, Sándor G. J. Hervey (1942–1997) and read critical editions of Ferdinand de Saussure's (1857–1913) Cours de linguistique générale. Saussure's concept of the linguistic sign also proved to be a major influence in his work.

== Human rights, identity issues, and liberal values ==
Aleksandar Bošković spent some years in the so-called "pro-democracy" journalism in Yugoslavia (1983–1990) and briefly worked as foreign politics editor and member of the editorial board of the Belgrade weekly magazine Student (1984/1985). During this period (1984–1990), he contributed to almost all of the major Yugoslav magazines. Aleksandar's journalistic texts and interviews dealt with political issues (he interviewed some of the former Praxis School philosophers – including Gajo Petrović, Svetozar Stojanović, and Mihailo Marković), foreign affairs, but also with cultural issues, comics and science fiction. Since 2015, he is occasionally writing for the liberal-oriented Belgrade newsmagazine Novi magazin.

From the mid-1990s, Bošković was a member of The Belgrade Circle, an "Association of Independent Intellectuals" that was opposed to nationalist policies of Serbian government, and whose members included philosopher Miladin Životić (1930-1997) and writer Radomir Konstantinović (1928-2011). Between 1996 and 2000 he was Associate Editor of the Association's journal, The Belgrade Circle Journal, for which he also translated several articles, wrote a couple of reviews, and edited a special section on different approaches and interpretations of the 1982 movie Blade Runner.

In 2006, Aleksandar Bošković briefly worked as a Program Director (in charge of transitional justice) in the Humanitarian Law Center in Belgrade. The interest in human rights followed on his criticism of nationalism and violence and led to his continuing collaboration with other human rights organizations in Serbia in the 1990s (like the Helsinki Committee for Human Rights). Bošković also worked for the UNDP in Belgrade on several short-term contracts, again on topics related to transitional justice. Throughout this period he has been an outspoken critic of nationalism, as well as of all other totalitarian and discriminatory practices and tendencies within Serbian society. In mid-1990s Bošković used the then-emerging concept of virtual reality to refer to the ways in which the political elites of Serbia (as well as other post-Yugoslav societies) understood the reality and the world among them. Several of his article on this topic were published in the Canadian Journal for Political Theory and widely read. The suggestion made in his writings was that the foreign observers and diplomats trying to communicate with Serbian leaders would be much more successful if they were aware of the concept of virtual reality, as the reality that the local political leaders believed in had no connection with what is usually (in everyday life) considered as real.

Following his interest in psychoanalysis, Bošković used Christopher Bollas's concept of the "fascist state of mind" to elaborate on the political and social situation in Serbia, in an essay published in the Belgrade weekly Novi magazin, on 15 June 2017. He also commented on the pervasiveness of racism in Serbian society, and the fact that it is a topic that is never discussed.

As a result of considering wider implications of the persuasiveness of nationalist-inspired thinking and ideas, Aleksandar Bošković organized a round table debate dedicated to Benedict Anderson (1936–2015), at the Institute of Social Sciences in Belgrade. This was at least in part due to the influence of Bruce Kapferer. Bošković also published a paper on anthropological studies of myths and nationalism in 2013, in the oldest anthropology journal in the world, Zeitschrift für Ethnologie - as a review article of Kapferer's major book. He wrote a chapter that deals with Serbia's troubled relationship with her own past, and the inability of the country's elites to come to terms with its nationalistic past. This paper was based on a presentation from the conference held at Landskronna (Sweden), in early June 2012. The chapter's title is "Serbia and the Surplus of History: Being Small, Large, and Small Again".

Bošković also contributed an entry "Images of Gender and Sexuality in Southern Africa" for The Wiley Blackwell Encyclopedia of Gender and Sexuality Studies, as well as (with his colleague from the Institute of Social Sciences, Suzana Ignjatović) on "Gender equality in Serbia".

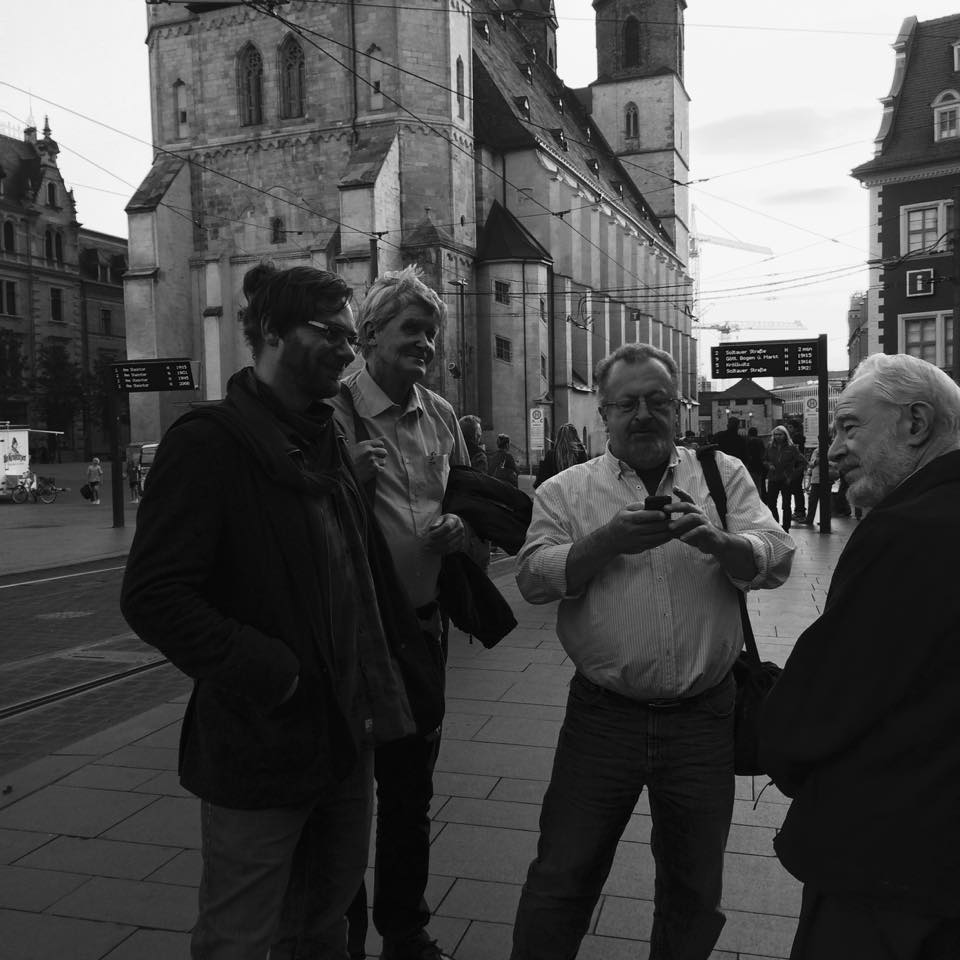
Aleksandar Bošković with (l to r) Immo Eulenberger, Robin Palmer, and Herbert S. Lewis, following the African Political Systems Revisited conference in Halle, 2015

== Teaching and research ==
Bošković taught his first academic course at the University of St Andrews during the Martinmas Term of 1994 ("Mesoamerican Pre-Columbian Civilisations"), at the Honours' level. He started teaching part-time at the Faculty of Social Sciences (FDV) of the University of Ljubljana in 2000 (M.A. level courses "Contemporary Anthropology" and "Anthropology and Feminism"). However, his most important teaching experience was after he moved to the Department of Anthropology of the University of Brasília in late March 1999, where he became interested in Mariza Peirano's and Roberto Cardoso de Oliveira's (1928–2006) concept of a horizontally-structured anthropology. (This will later influence his interest in "World Anthropologies.") While in Brasília, Bošković taught courses on gender, myth, anthropological theory, Latin America, but also started to develop an interest in anthropology of Europe, as he was hired as "Visiting Professor of European Ethnology." His monograph on Mesoamerica (Mesoamerican Religions and Archaeology: Essays in Pre-Columbian Civilizations) was published by Archaeopress in January 2017.

In February 2001 Bošković moved to the University of the Witwatersrand in (Johannesburg, South Africa) on a Postdoctoral Research Fellowship. In the next two years he also taught courses on religion, myth, and ethnicity. While in Johannesburg, he met (and had the opportunity to discuss anthropology with) W.D. Hammond-Tooke (1926–2004), the last of the great 20th century South African anthropologists. In 2003, Bošković was hired as a senior lecturer at the Department of Anthropology of Rhodes University, a department that Hammond-Tooke helped establish during the 1960s. At Rhodes, Bošković further developed his interests in the history and theory of anthropology. This department provided a brilliant academic setting, with colleagues like Chris de Wet, Robin Palmer, Penny Bernard, among others. Furthermore, his interest in history and theory of anthropology resulted in publication of several books. His book Myth, Politics, Ideology was published in late 2006 in Belgrade, and it covered different theoretical aspects of the study of myths, understood (in Raymond Aron's sense) as part of ideology. The book also included several chapters on different aspects of Mesoamerican religions – some in revised versions from their original publications, and some previously unpublished. This also coincided with Bošković's interest in the study of ethnicity and nationalism, and his overall view that multiculturalism is an essential component of all human societies. Some of these aspects were discussed while he was a guest at the University of Oslo in 2007, following the invitation of Thomas Hylland Eriksen.

Aleksandar Bošković was invited to teach part-time in the Department of Ethnology and Anthropology of the Belgrade's Faculty of Philosophy in 2009. He started teaching courses related to history and theory in anthropology, mostly due to the favorable reception of his introductory book in anthropology, published in 2010. In 2012, the Senate of the University of Belgrade elected him as a full professor, and he taught full-time in the department from 1 January 2013 until 3 February 2022. From 2017 he was teaching anthropology at the University of Donja Gorica in Montenegro. Between 2003 and 2019 Bošković worked at the Institute of Social Sciences in Belgrade, where he was (May 2009- February 2017) the Head of the Center for Political Studies and Public Opinion Research. Since 1 October 2019 Bošković is Senior Research Scientist ("naučni savetnik") at the Archaeological Institute in Belgrade. In March and April 2022, he taught a course as a visiting professor in the Institute of Ethnology and Cultural Anthropology at Jagiellonian University in Kraków, Poland. In February 2023, Bošković moved to Natal, Brazil, taking the post of Visiting Professor in Social Anthropology at the UFRN, where until February 2026 he taught courses on Anthropology and Psychoanalysis, Anthropology of religion and History of Anthropology.

Between August 2016 and October 2020, Bošković was EASA Book Series Editor. Together with Han Vermeulen, he was co-convenor of the History of Anthropology Network of the EASA (2016-2018). Since 2019, he has been editor of the Berghahn Books series Anthropology's Ancestors. Between 2022 and 2026 he was co-editor of the Anthropological Journal of European Cultures.

In the early 2000s, Bošković edited a volume Other People's Anthropologies: Ethnographic Practice on the Margins (New York and Oxford: Berghahn Books, 2008) The book presented an important contribution to the growing field of "World Anthropologies," as it dealt with different national/regional anthropological traditions (including Russian, Dutch, Bulgarian, Kenyan, Argentinian, Turkish, Cameroonian, Japanese, Yugoslav, Norwegian, and Brazilian), all of them located outside of the so-called "central (or dominant) anthropological traditions" (Anglo-American, French and German). However, better known in Serbo-Croatian (and in the former Yugoslav region) is his book Kratak uvod u antropologiju [A Brief Introduction to Anthropology], published in late 2010 by the Jesenski i Turk in Zagreb (Croatia). Serbian edition of the book was published in April 2010, based on a series of lectures delivered at the Rex Cultural Centre. In 2014, Aleksandar Bošković published a book in Serbia on Anthropological perspectives

Following up on his interest in psychoanalysis, in early 2020 Bošković started research on the way in which individuals objectify social facts, based on the research of Scottish psychoanalyst Ronald Fairbairn (1889-1964). This research was briefly interrupted by the outbreak of the COVID-19 pandemic, but that provided an opportunity for another line of research into the rationality of human behavior and the choices that people make.

== Max Planck Institute and academic encounters ==
As a result of his long collaboration with the Max Planck Institute for Social Anthropology, Aleksandar Bošković also co-edited a volume on the development of anthropologies/ ethnologies in Southeastern Europe between 1945 and 1991, with Chris Hann, in which he also contributed a Postscript. Together with Günther Schlee, he also organized a conference which commemorated 75 years since the publication of the seminal book African Political Systems. The volume was published by Berghahn Books in 2022.

As part of a dialogue about the anthropological perspectives on identity and identification, Bošković published a review essay on the uses of rational choice in anthropology in Ethnos in 2012 (with Suzana Ignjatović). The interest in rationality also resulted in the process of helping Suzana Ignjatović organize a Symposium about Individualism at the Institute of Social Sciences in Belgrade, on 20 October 2017. The Symposium resulted in the edited volume, with international contributors including Walter Block, Veselin Vukotić, and Patrick Laviolette. This event also received attention (and formed a major part in the leading story) in one of the leading Serbian news magazines.

His co-edited book on African Political Systems was published in April 2022, and the book that sums up the history of humanity from an anthropological perspective ("from the Stone Age to Computer Age"), was published in Serbo-Croatian in 2021. This last title was the third in what Bošković referred to (tongue-in-cheek) as his "COVID trilogy" - i.e., the books completed and submitted to publishers during the COVID crisis, in 2020 and 2021. The other two books were the William Robertson Smith biography, and the edited volume on myth. On 15 December 2022, he gave a presentation on Smith's influence on Émile Durkheim as part of the Séminaire sur la « révélation » de Durkheim année 3 (2022/2023), organized by Matthieu Béra, Césor/EHESS (University of Bordeaux).

== Guest lectures and invited seminars ==
Since 1986, Aleksandar gave more than 270 guest lectures or seminars and six short courses in 27 countries. He delivered these lectures and seminars at, among other places, University of Oslo, University of Bergen, Goldsmiths College, Vanderbilt University, College of William and Mary, University of Cambridge, University of St. Andrews, University of Leiden, Ben Gurion University of the Negev, Hebrew University of Jerusalem's School of Philosophy and Religions, and University of Hamburg. In recent years, he also spoke about topics such as rationality (both at the IUAES Congress in Manchester in 2013, and at the Inter-Congress in Chiba, Japan in 2014), identity (at the meeting of the Croatian Ethnological Society in Zagreb in 2013), Giambattista Vico (at the ASA Decennial Conference in Edinburgh, 2014), ethnicity (in the Masters' seminar at the University of Leipzig, 2014) and anthropology in Belgrade (at the Institute of Social Anthropology, Wilhelms University of Münster (Germany), in 2014). In late April 2017, Bošković lectured at the Department of Social Anthropology at the Panteion University in Athens, as part of the ERASMUS exchange.

Together with Professor Günther Schlee, Bošković organized a Workshop commemorating 75th anniversary of the African Political Systems at the Max Planck Institute for Social Anthropology, 10–11 September 2015. With David Shankland, he co-convened the workshop Themes in the history of anthropology at the 2016 EASA, and with Thomas Hylland Eriksen, the workshop Clashing scales of infrastructural development at the 2017 SIEF Congress in Göttingen.

In the early 2018, following the invitation of his colleague, anthropologist and psychotherapist Salma Siddique, he spent six weeks as a visiting researcher at the University of Aberdeen. During this period, Bošković gave two talks about The Meaning of Maya Myths (unrelated to the 1989 article), at King's College, Aberdeen and at the University of Edinburgh, as well as a lecture on anthropology and psychoanalysis, in the school of education. In the early June, he gave a talk on Classic Maya myths and politics at the 12th Annual International Conference on Comparative Mythology at Tohoku University in Sendai, Japan. He continued his association with the IACM, becoming a member of the Board of Directors in 2020. In June 2022, 15th conference of the International Association for Comparative Mythology (IACM) was held in Belgrade and Viminacium, at the Institute of Archaeology. The theme of the conference was Sacred Ground: Place and Space in Mythology and Religion. In early June 2026, at the conference in Edinburgh, Bošković was elected Secretary of the Association.

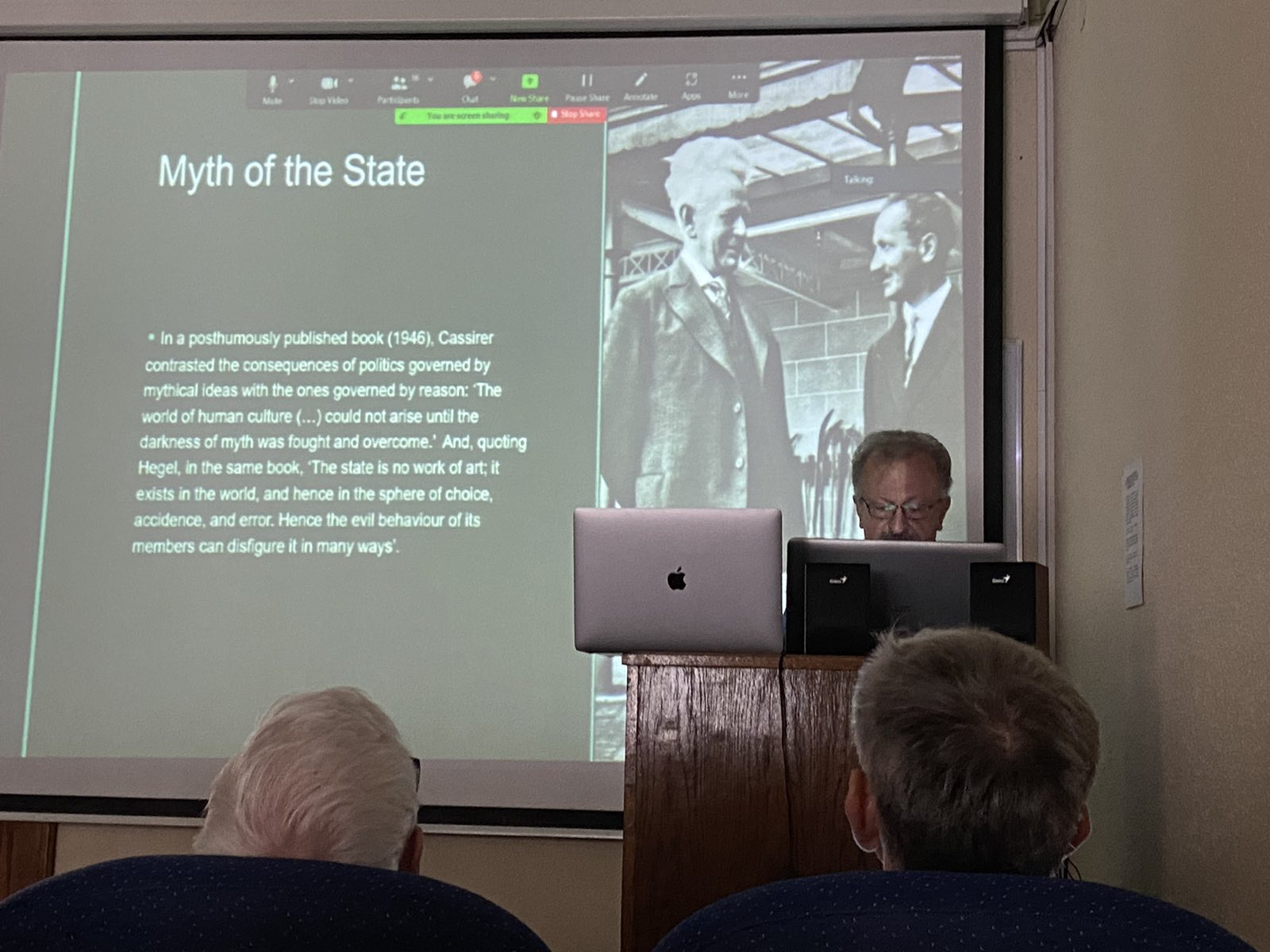
Presentation at the 15th IACM conference in 2022

== Selected works in English ==
- Other People's Theories: From Myth to Anthropology and Back. Journal of Folklore Research 62, 1-2 (2025)
- Thomas Hylland Eriksen (1962-2024): A Personal Account. Encyclopédie Bérose des histoires de l'anthropologie https://www.berose.fr/article3816.html?lang=fr
- Ethnographic Museums: A History. Anthropological Journal of European Cultures 33 (2024)
- Anthropologists at War? Anthropology Today 38 (2022)
- African Political Systems Revisited: Changing Perspectives on Statehood and Power (2022, ed. w/Günther Schlee)
- William Robertson Smith (2021)
- Anthropology and Nationalism. American Anthropologist 121 (2019)
- Mesoamerican Religions and Archaeology: Essays in Pre-Columbian Civilizations (2017)
- The Anthropological Field on the Margins of Europe, 1945–1991 (2013, ed. w/Chris Hann)
- Other People's Anthropologies: Ethnographic Practice on the Margins (2008/2010, ed.)
- Serbia and the surplus of history: Being small, large, and small again, in Small Countries: Structures and Sensibilities (2017, eds. Ulf Hannerz and Andre Gingrich)
- Gender equality in Serbia (w/Suzana Ignjatović), in Gender Equality in a Global Perspective (2017, eds. Anders Örtenblad, Raili Marling and Snježana Vasiljević)
- Escape from the future: Anthropological practice and everyday life, in Balkan Heritages (2015, eds. Maria Couroucli and Tchavdar Marinov)
- A very personal anthropology of Mary Douglas Anthropological Notebooks 22 (2016)
- Socio-cultural anthropology today: An overview Campos 6 (2005)
- Anthropological perspectives on myth Anuário Antropológico 99 (2002)
- Great Goddesses of the Aztecs: Their meaning and functions Indiana 12 (1995)
