= Charles Smyth =

Charles Smyth may refer to:

- Charles Smyth (politician) (1693–1784), MP for Limerick
- Charles Piazzi Smyth (1819–1900), Scottish astronomer
- C. E. Owen Smyth (Charles Edward Owen Smyth, 1851–1925), Irish-born Australian civil servant
- Charles Henry Smyth Jr. (1866–1937), American geologist
- Charles Gordon Smyth (1883–1927), New Zealand policeman, trade unionist and baker
- Charles Phelps Smyth (1895–1990), American chemist
- Charles Smyth (priest) (1903–1987), Chinese-born British Anglican priest and Canon of Westminster
- Charles Henry Smyth, known as Harry Smyth (1910–1992), Canadian speed skater

== See also ==
- Charlie Smyth (born 2001), Northern Irish-born American football player
- Charles Smith (disambiguation)
