= William Robertson Smith =

British minister and academic (1846–1894)

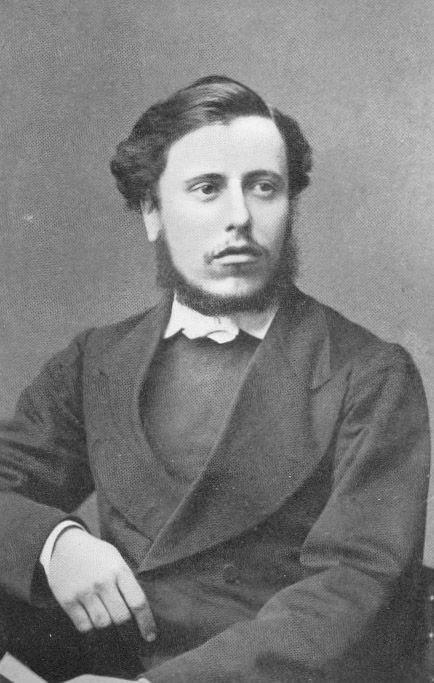
- Born: 8 November 1846; Keig, Aberdeenshire, Scotland
- Died: 31 March 1894 (aged 47); Cambridge, England
- Education: New College, Edinburgh
- Occupations: Minister of religion, theologian, Semitic scholar
- Writing career
- Notable work: Religion of the Semites

William Robertson Smith FRSE (8 November 1846 – 31 March 1894) was a Scottish orientalist, Old Testament scholar, professor of divinity, and minister of the Free Church of Scotland. He was an editor of the Encyclopædia Britannica and contributor to the Encyclopaedia Biblica. He is also known for his book Religion of the Semites, which is considered a foundational text in the comparative study of religion.

== Life and career ==
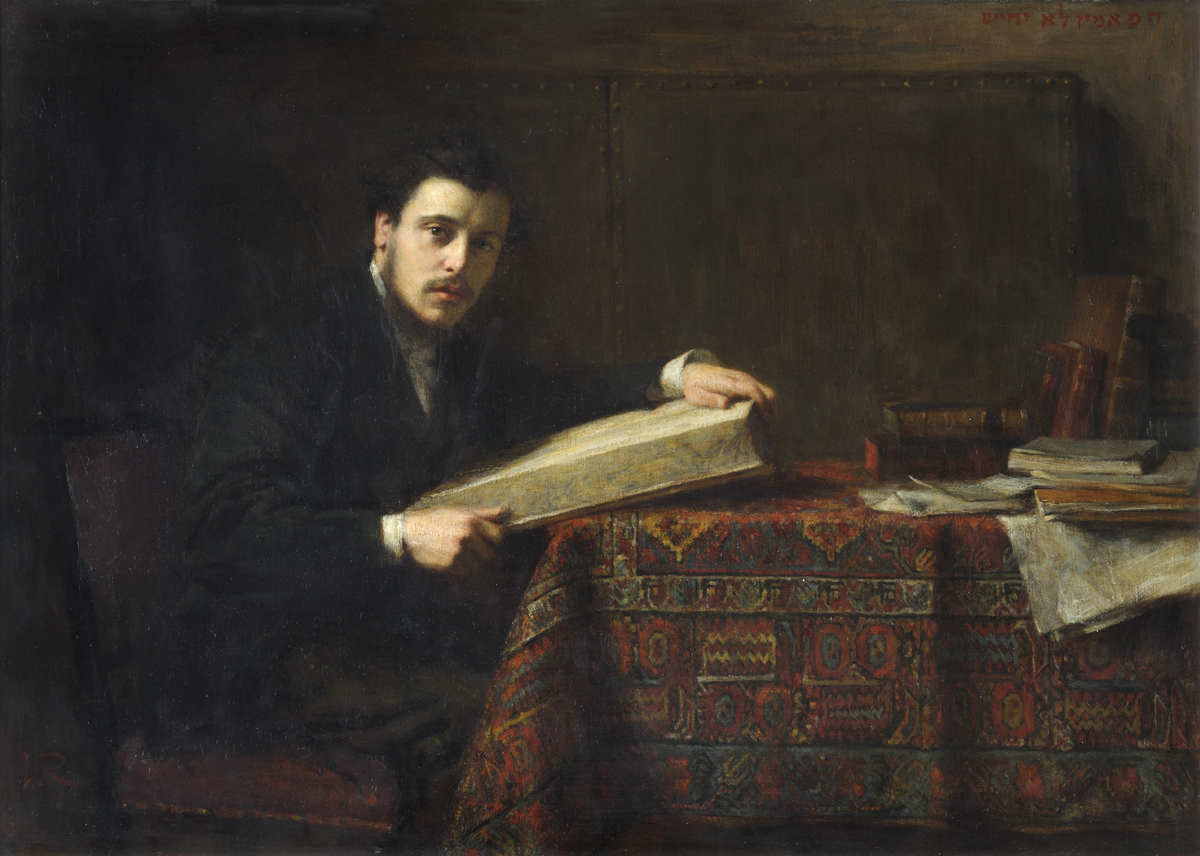
William Robertson Smith with a large volume

Smith was born in Keig in Aberdeenshire the eldest son of Rev Dr William Pirie Smith DD (1811–1890), minister of the recently created Free Church of Scotland for the parishes of Keig and Tough, and of his wife, Jane Robertson. His brother was Charles Michie Smith.

He demonstrated a quick intellect at an early age. He entered Aberdeen University at fifteen, before transferring to New College, Edinburgh, to train for the ministry, in 1866. After graduation he took up a chair in Hebrew at the Aberdeen Free Church College in 1870, succeeding Prof Marcus Sachs.

In 1875, he wrote a number of important articles on religious topics in the ninth edition of the Encyclopædia Britannica. He became popularly known because of his trial for heresy in the 1870s, following the publication of an article in Britannica.

Letter by Smith (1887)

In 1871 he was elected a Fellow of the Royal Society of Edinburgh; his proposer was Peter Guthrie Tait.

Smith's articles approached religious topics without endorsing the Bible as literally true. The result was a furore in the Free Church of Scotland, of which he was a member as well as criticism from conservative parts of America. As a result of the heresy trial, he lost his position at the Aberdeen Free Church College in 1881 and took up a position as a reader in Arabic at the University of Cambridge, where he eventually rose to the position of University Librarian, Professor of Arabic and a fellow of Christ's College. It was during this time that he wrote The Old Testament in the Jewish Church (1881) and The Prophets of Israel (1882), which were intended to be theological treatises for the lay audience.

In 1887 Smith became the editor of the Encyclopædia Britannica after the death of his employer Thomas Spencer Baynes left the position vacant. In 1889 he wrote his most important work, Religion of the Semites, an account of ancient Jewish religious life which pioneered the use of sociology in the analysis of religious phenomena. He was Professor of Arabic there with the full title 'Sir Thomas Adams Professor of Arabic' (1889–1894).

He died of tuberculosis at Christ's College, Cambridge on 31 March 1894. He is buried with his parents at Keig churchyard.

== Approach ==
His views on the historical method of criticism can be illustrated in the following quote:

Ancient books coming down to us from a period many centuries before the invention of printing have necessarily undergone many vicissitudes. Some of them are preserved only in imperfect copies made by an ignorant scribe of the dark ages. Others have been disfigured by editors, who mixed up foreign matter with the original text. Very often an important book fell altogether out of sight for a long time, and when it came to light again all knowledge of its origin was gone; for old books did not generally have title-pages and prefaces. And, when such a nameless roll was again brought into notice, some half-informed reader or transcriber was not unlikely to give it a new title of his own devising, which was handed down thereafter as if it had been original. Or again, the true meaning and purpose of a book often became obscure in the lapse of centuries, and led to false interpretations. Once more, antiquity has handed down to us many writings which are sheer forgeries, like some of the Apocryphal books, or the Sibylline oracles, or those famous Epistles of Phalaris which formed the subject of Bentley's great critical essay. In all such cases the historical critic must destroy the received view, in order to establish the truth. He must review doubtful titles, purge out interpolations, expose forgeries; but he does so only to manifest the truth, and exhibit the genuine remains of antiquity in their real character. A book that is really old and really valuable has nothing to fear from the critic, whose labours can only put its worth in a clearer light, and establish its authority on a surer basis.

== Published works ==
Among his writings are the following:

=== Books: annotated ===
==== The Old Testament in the Jewish Church ====
- The Old Testament in the Jewish Church. A course of lectures on biblical criticism (Edinburgh: A. & C. Black 1881); second edition (London: A. & C. Black 1892).
  - The author addresses the Christian believer who opposes higher criticism of the Old Testament, considering that it will reduce the Bible to rational historical terms and omit the supernatural [cf. 3–5]. He replies that the Bible's purpose is to give its readers entry into the experience of lived faith, to put them in touch with God working in history, which a true understanding of the text will better provide [8–9]. Critical Bible study, in fact, follows in the spirit of the Protestant Reformation [18–19].
  - Prior Catholic study of the Bible is faulted for being primarily interested in drawing out consistent doctrines [7, 25]. Instead Protestants initially turned to Jewish scholars who could better teach them Hebrew. However, the chief purpose of Jewish learning was legal: the Bible being a source of Jewish law, derived to settle their current disputes and issues of practice [52].
  - As Protestant bible study continued, the nature of the text began to reveal itself as complex and many layered. For example, especially in the earlier books, two different, redundant, and sometimes inconsistent versions appeared to co-exist [133]. This would imply that an editor had woven several pre-existing narratives together to form a composite text [cf. 90–91].
  - The Psalms are shown to reflect the life of the entire Hebrew people, rather than that of a single traditional author, King David [224].
  - Prior understanding was that all ritual and civil law in the Pentateuch (Books of Moses) had originated at Mount Sinai; Bible history being the story of how the Hebrews would follow or not a comprehensive moral order [231–232]. Yet from the Bible text, the author demonstrates how ritual law was initially ignored after Moses [254–256, 259]; only much later, following the return from exile, was the ritual system established under Ezra [226–227].
  - The Pentateuch contains laws and history [321]. Its history "does not profess to be written by Moses" as "he himself is habitually spoken of in the third person" [323–324]. From internal evidence found in the Bible, Pentateuch history was "written in the land of Canaan" after the death of Moses (c. 13th century BC), probably as late as "the period of kings", perhaps written under Saul or under David (c. 1010–970) [325].
  - The laws found in the Book of Deuteronomy [xii-xxvi] are also demonstrated to date to a time long after Moses [318–320]. In fact, everything in the reforms under King Josiah (r.640-609) are found written in the Deuteronomic code. His Book of the Covenant probably is none other than "the law of Deuteronomy, which, in its very form, appears to have once been a separate volume" [258]. Internal evidence found in the bible is discussed [e.g., 353–355].
  - In the centuries immediately following Moses, the Pentateuch was not the primary rule; rather Divine spiritual guidance was provided to the ancient Hebrew nation by their prophets [334–345].
- Smith's lectures were originally given in Edinburgh and Glasgow during early 1881. "It is of the first importance for the reader to realize that Biblical Criticism is not the invention of modern scholars, but the legitimate interpretation of historical facts." The result is that "the history of Israel... [makes]... one of the strongest evidences of Christianity." (Author's Preface, 1881).
- Doctrinal opposition against Smith first arose after his 1875 encyclopaedia article "Bible" which covered similar ground. In 1878 Church heresy charges had been filed, "the chief of which concerned the authorship of Deuteronomy." These 1881 lectures followed his removal as professor at the Free Church College in Aberdeen.
- Smith's 1881 edition "was a landmark in the history of biblical criticism in Britain, in particular because it laid before the general public the critical view to which Wellhausen had given classical expression in his Geschichte Israels which had appeared less than three years earlier, in 1878." Yet "Smith did not merely repeat the arguments of Wellhausen, or anyone else; he approached the subject in a quite original way."

==== The Prophets of Israel ====
- The Prophets of Israel and their place in history, to the close of the 8th century B.C. (Edinburgh: A. & C. Black 1882), reprinted with introduction and notes by T. K. Cheney (London: A. & C. Black 1895).
  - The Hebrew prophets are presented in context with the ancient religious practice by neighboring nations. Instead of divination, elsewhere often used for political convenience or emotional release (however earnest), here the prophets of Israel witness to the God of justice, i.e., to their God's true nature [85–87, 107–108]. In announcing ethical guidance, these ancient prophets declared to the Jewish people the will of their God acting in history [70–75].
  - The opening chapters introduce the nature of Jehovah in Jewish history after Moses [33–41, {110–112, 116–118}] discussing neighboring religions [26–27, 38–40, 49–51, 66–68], regional theocracy [47–53], henotheism [53–60], national survival [32–39] and righteousness [34–36, 70–74], as well as Judges [30–31, 39, 42–45], and the prophet Elijah [76–87]. Then follows chapters on the prophets Amos [III], Hosea [IV], and Isaiah [V-VII], wherein Smith seeks to demonstrate how the Hebrew religion grew through each prophet's message. The work concludes with the secular and religious history of the period preceding the exile [VIII].
- In his Preface [xlix-lviii, at lvi–lvii], the author acknowledges reliance on critical biblical studies, specifically that established by Ewald, developed by Graf, and furthered by Kuenen referencing his Godsdienst, by Duhm per his Theologie der Propheten, and by Wellhausen, citing his Geschichte (1878).
- The author confidently rests the case for biblical religion on "ordinary methods of historical investigation" [17] and on the "general law of human history that truth is consistent, progressive, and imperishable, while every falsehood is self-contradictory, and ultimately falls to pieces. A religion which has endured every possible trial... declares itself by irresistible evidence to be a thing of reality and power." [16].
- Yet, despite his heresy trial, current modern scholarship appraises W. R. Smith as too beholden to nineteenth-century Protestant doctrine, so that he fails in his Prophets of Israel book to achieve his avowed aim of historical inquiry. However flawed, "he will be remembered as a pioneer."

==== Kinship and Marriage in Early Arabia ====
- Kinship and Marriage in Early Arabia (Cambridge University 1885); second edition, with additional notes by the Author and by Professor Ignaz Goldziher, Budapest, and edited with an introduction by Stanley A. Cook (London: A. & C. Black 1903); reprint 1963 Beacon Press, Boston, with a new Preface by E. L. Peters. This book in particular, among many others, drew the broad-brush criticism of Prof. Said as swimming in the narrow blinkered sea of 19th-century European Orientalism.
  - This work traces, from an earlier totemist matriarchy that practiced exogamy, the further development of a "system of male kinship, with corresponding laws of marriage and tribal organization, which prevailed in Arabia at the time of Mohammed." (Author's Preface).
  - Chapters:
    - 1. The Theory of the Genealogists as to the Origin of Arabic Tribal Groups. E.g., Bakr and Taghlib (proper names of ancestors), fictitious ancestors, unity of the tribal blood, female eponyms;
    - 2. The Kindred Group [hayy] and its Dependents and Allies. E.g., adoption, blood covenant, property, tribe and family;
    - 3. The Homogeneity of the Kindred Group in relation to the Law of Marriage and Descent. E.g., exogamy, types of marriage (e.g., capture, contract, purchase), inheritance, divorce, women's property;
    - 4. Paternity. E.g., original sense of fatherhood, polyandry, infanticide;
    - 5. Paternity, Polyandry with Male Kinship, and with Kinship through Women. E.g., evidence of Strabo, conjugal fidelity, chastity, milk brotherhood, two (female, and male) systems of kinship, decay of tribal feeling;
    - 6. Female Kinship and Marriage Bars. E.g. forbidden degrees, the tent (bed) in marriage, matronymic families, beena marriages, ba'al marriage, totemism and heterogeneous groups;
    - 7. Totemism. E.g., tribes named from animals, jinn, tribal marks or wasm;
    - 8. Conclusion. E.g., origin of the tribal system, migrations of the Semites.
- Conceived at the frontier of academic study on early culture, Smith's work relied on a current anthropology proposed by the late John Ferguson McLennan, in his Primitive Marriage (Edinburgh 1865). (Author's Preface). Smith also employed recent material by A. G. Wilken, Het Matriarchaat bij de oude Arabieren (1884) and by E. B. Tylor, Arabian Matriarchate (1884), and received suggestions from Theodor Nöldeke and from Ignaz Goldziher. (Author's Preface).
- Although still admired on several counts, the scholarly consensus now disfavors many of its conclusions. Smith here "forced the facts to fit McLennan's evolutionary schema, which was entirely defective." Professor Edward Evans-Pritchard, while praising Smith for his discussion of the tribe [hayy], finds his theories about an early matriarchy wanting. Smith conceived feminine names for tribes as "survivals" of matriarchy, but they may merely reflect grammar, i.e., "collective terms in Arabic are constantly feminine", or lineage practice, i.e., "in a polygamous society the children of one father may be distinguished into groups by use of their mothers' names". Evans-Pritchard also concludes that "Smith makes out no case for the ancient Bedouin being totemic" but only for their "interest in nature". He faults Smith for his "blind acceptance of McLennan's formulations".
- Smith was part of a general movement by historians, anthropologists, and others, that both theorized a matriarchy present in early civilizations and discovered traces of it. In the 19th century it included eminent scholars and well-known authors such as J.J. Bachofen, James George Frazer, Frederick Engels, and in the 20th century Robert Graves, Carl Jung, Joseph Campbell, Marija Gimbutas. Smith's conclusions were based on the then prevailing notion that matrifocal and matrilineal societies were the norm in Europe and western Asia, at least prior to the invasion of the Indo-Europeans from central Asia. Subsequent findings have not been kind to that thread of Smith's work which offers a prehistoric matriarchy to schematize the Semites. It is certainly recognized that a large number of prehistoric hunter-gatherer cultures practiced matrilinear or cognatic succession, as do many hunter-gatherer cultures today. Yet it is no longer widely accepted by scholars that the earliest Semites had a matrilineal system. This is due largely to the unearthing of thousands of Safaitic inscriptions in pre-Islamic Arabia, which appear to indicate that, on the issues of inheritance, succession, and political power, the Arabs of the pre-Islamic period were little different from the Arabs today. Evidence from both Arab and Amorite sources discloses the early Semitic family as being mainly patriarchal and patrilineal, as are the Bedouin today, while the early Indo-European family may have been matrilineal, or at least allotting high social status to women. Robert G. Hoyland a scholar of the Arabs and Islam writes, "While descent through the male line would seem to have been the norm in pre-Islamic Arabia, we are occasionally given hints of matrilineal arrangements."

==== The Religion of the Semites (1st series) ====
- Lectures on the Religion of the Semites. Fundamental Institutions. First Series (London: Adam & Charles Black 1889); second edition [posthumous], edited by J. S. Black (1894), reprint 1956 by Meridian Library, New York; third edition, introduced and additional notes by S. A. Cook (1927), reprint 1969 by Ktav, New York, with prolegomenon by James Muilenberg.
  - This well-known work seeks to reconstruct from scattered documents the several common religious practices and associated social behavior of the ancient Semitic peoples, i.e., of Mesopotamia, Syria, Phoenicia, Israel, Arabia [1, 9–10]. The book thus provides the contemporary historical context for the earlier Biblical writings.
  - In two introductory lectures the author discusses primal religion and its evolution, which now seem too often to over generalize (perhaps inevitable in a pioneer work). In the first, Smith notes with caution the cuneiform records of Babylon, and the influence of ancient Egypt, then mentions pre-Islamic Arabia and the Hebrew Bible [13–14]; he discounts any possibility of "a complete comparative religion of Semitic religions" [15].
  - In the second lecture, Smith's comments range widely on various facets of primal religion in Semitic society, e.g., on the protected strangers (Heb: gērīm, sing. gēr; Arab: jīrān, sing. jār) who were "personally free but had no political rights". Smith continues, that as the tribe protects the gēr, so does the God protect the tribe as "clients" who obey and so are righteous; hence the tribal God may develop into a universal Deity whose worshippers follow ethical precepts [75–81].
  - Of the eleven lectures, Holy Places are discussed in lectures III to V. In the third lecture, nature gods of the land are discussed [84–113]; later jinn and their haunts are investigated [118–137], wherein the nature of totems are introduced [124–126]; then totem animals are linked to jinn [128–130], and the totem to the tribal god [137–139]. The fourth lecture discusses, e.g., the holiness and the taboos of the sanctuary. The fifth: holy waters, trees, caves, and stones.
  - Sacrifices are addressed in lectures VI to XI. The sixth contains Smith's controversial theory of communal sacrifice regarding the totem, wherein the tribe, at a collective meal of the totem animal, come to realize together a social bond together with their totem-linked tribal god [226–231]. This communion theory, shared in some regard with Wellhausen, now enjoys little strong support.
- On the cutting edge of biblical scholarship, this work builds on a narrower study by his friend professor Julius Wellhausen, Reste Arabischen Heidentums (Berlin 1887), and on other works on the religious history of the region and in general. (Smith's Preface). The author also employs analogies drawn from James George Frazer, to apply where insufficient data existed for the ancient Semites. (Smith's Preface). Hence Smith's methodology was soon criticized by Theodor Nöldeke.
- Generally, the book was well received by contemporaries. It won Wellhausen's praise. Later it would influence Émile Durkheim, Mircea Eliade, James George Frazer, Sigmund Freud, and Bronisław Malinowski.
- After 75 years Evans-Pritchard, although noting his wide influence, summarized criticism of Smith's totemism, "Bluntly, all Robertson Smith really does is to guess about a period of Semitic history about which we know almost nothing."

==== The Religion of the Semites (2nd and 3rd series) ====
- Lectures on the Religion of the Semites. Second and Third Series, edited with an introduction by John Day (Sheffield Academic 1995).
- Based on the 'newly discovered' original lecture notes of William Robertson Smith; only the first series had been prepared for publication (1889, 2d ed. 1894) by the author. (Editor's Introduction at 11–13). Smith earlier had written that "three courses of lectures" were planned: the first regarding "practical religious institutions", the second on "the gods of Semitic heathenism", with the third focusing on the influence of Semitic monotheism. Yet because the first course of lectures (ending with sacrifice) did not finish, it left coverage of feasts and the priesthood "to run over into the second course".
  - Second Series [33–58]: I. Feasts; II. Priests and the Priestly Oracles; III. Diviners and Prophets.
  - Third Series [59–112]: I. Semitic Polytheism (1); II. Semitic Polytheism (2); III. The Gods and the World: Cosmogony.
- An Appendix [113–142] contains contemporary press reports describing the lectures, including reports of extemporaneous comments made by Robertson Smith, which appear in neither of the two published texts derived from his lecture notes.

=== Other Writings ===
- Articles in the Encyclopædia Britannica (9th edition, 1875–1889) XXIV volumes, which include: "Angel" II (1875), "Bible" III (1875), "Chronicles, Books of" V (1886), "David" VI (1887), "Decalogue" VII (1877), "Hebrew Language and Literature" XI (1880), "Hosea" XII (1881), "Jerusalem" XIII (1881), "Mecca" & "Medina" XV (1883), "Messiah" XVI (1883), "Paradise" XVIII (1885), "Priest" & "Prophet" XIX (1885), "Psalms, Book of" XX (1886), "Sacrifice" XXI (1886), "Temple" & "Tithes" XXIII (1888).
- Lectures and Essays, edited by J. S. Black and G. W. Chrystal (London: Adam & Charles Black 1912).
  - I. Scientific Papers (1869–1873), 5 papers including: "On the flow of Electricity in Conducting Surfaces" (1870);
  - II. Early Theological essays (1868–1870), 4 essays including: "Christianity and the supernatural" (1869), and, "The question of prophecy in the critical schools of the continent" (1870);
  - III. Early Aberdeen lectures (1870–1874), 5 lectures including: "What history teaches us to seek in the Bible" (1870); and, "The fulfilment of Prophecy" (1871).
  - IV. Later Aberdeen lectures (1874–1877), 4 lectures including: "On the study of the Old Testament in 1876" (1877); and, "On the poetry of the Old Testament" (1877).
  - V. Arabian studies (1880–1881), 2 studies: "Animal tribes in the Old Testament" (1880); "A journey in the Hejâz" (1881).
  - VI. Reviews of Books, 2 reviews: Wellhausen's Geschichte Israels [1878] (1879); Renan's Histoire du Peuple d'Israël [1887] (1887).
- "Preface" to Julius Wellhausen, Prolegomena to the History of Israel, transl. by J.S.Black & A.Menzies (Edinburgh: Black 1885) at v–x.
- "Review" of Rudolf Kittel, Geschichte der Hebräer, II (1892) in the English Historical Review 8:314–316 (1893).

== Heresy Trial documents ==
- The Presbytery's prosecution.
  - Free Church of Scotland, Presbytery of Aberdeen, The Libel against Professor William Robertson Smith (1878).
- Smith's answers, and letter (published as pamphlets).
  - "Answer to the form of libel" (Edinburgh: Douglas 1878).
  - "Additional answer to the libel" (Edinburgh: Douglas 1878).
  - "Answer to the amended libel" (Edinburgh: Douglas 1879).
  - "An open letter to principal Rainy" (Edinburgh: Douglas 1880).

== Commentary on Smith ==
- E. G. Brown, Obituary Notice. Prof. William Robertson Smith (London: Journal of the Royal Asiatic Society, July 1894), 12 pages.
- Patrick Carnegie Simpson, The Life of Principal Rainy (London: Hodder and Stoughton 1909). Vol 2, pp. 306–403.
- John Sutherland Black & George Chrystal, The Life of William Robertson Smith (London: Adam & Charles Black 1912).
- A. R. Hope Moncreiff "Bonnie Scotland" (1922) or Scotland from Black's Popular Series of Colour Books.
- John Buchan, The Kirk in Scotland (Edinburgh: Hodder and Stoughton Ltd. 1930).
- Ronald Roy Nelson, The Life and Thought of William Robertson Smith, 1846–1894 (dissertation, University of Michigan 1969).
- T. O. Beidelman, W. Robertson Smith and the Sociological Study of Religion (Chicago 1974).
- Edward Evans-Pritchard, A History of Anthropological Thought (NY: Basic Books 1981), Chap. 8 "Robertson Smith" at 69–81.
- Richard Allan Riesen, Criticism & Faith in late Victorian Scotland: A. B. Davidson, William Robertson Smith, George Adam Smith (University Press of America 1985)
- William Johnstone, editor, William Robertson Smith: Essays in reassessment (Sheffield Academic 1995).
- Gillian M. Bediako, Primal Religion and the Bible: William Robertson Smith and his heritage (Sheffield Academic 1997).
- John William Rogerson, The Bible and Criticism in Victorian Britain: Profiles of F. D. Maurice and William Robertson Smith (Sheffield Academic 1997).
- Aleksandar Bošković, "Anthropological Perspectives on Myth", Anuário Antropológico (Rio de Janeiro 2002) 99, pp. 103–144.
- Alice Thiele Smith, Children of the Manse. Growing up in Victorian Aberdeenshire (Edinburgh: The Bellfield Press, 2004) Edited by Gordon Booth and Astrid Hess.
- Bernhard Maier, William Robertson Smith. His life, his work, and his times (Tübingen: Mohr Siebeck 2009). [Forschungen zum Alten Testament].

== In popular culture ==
Hiphop artist Astronautalis wrote a song about Smith entitled "The Case of William Smith".

== Family ==
His younger brother was the astronomer Charles Michie Smith FRSE.
