= Chuck Smith =

Chuck Smith may refer to:

- Chuck Smith (pastor) (1927–2013), Protestant pastor and founder of Calvary Chapel
- Chuck Smith (businessman) (born 1940s), retired President and CEO of AT&T West
- Chuck Smith (sprinter) (born 1949), American sprinter
- Chuck Smith (American football coach) (born 1957), American football coach
- Chuck Smith (baseball) (born 1969), former pitcher in Major League Baseball
- Chuck Smith (defensive end) (born 1969), former NFL defensive lineman
- Chuck Smith (Florida politician) (1928–2021), American politician in Florida
- Chuck Smith (Kansas politician) (born 1951), American politician in the Kansas House of Representatives
- Chuck Smith (filmmaker), New York–based documentary filmmaker and author

== See also ==
- Charles Smith (disambiguation)
