= Isaac Pocock =

English painter (1782–1835)

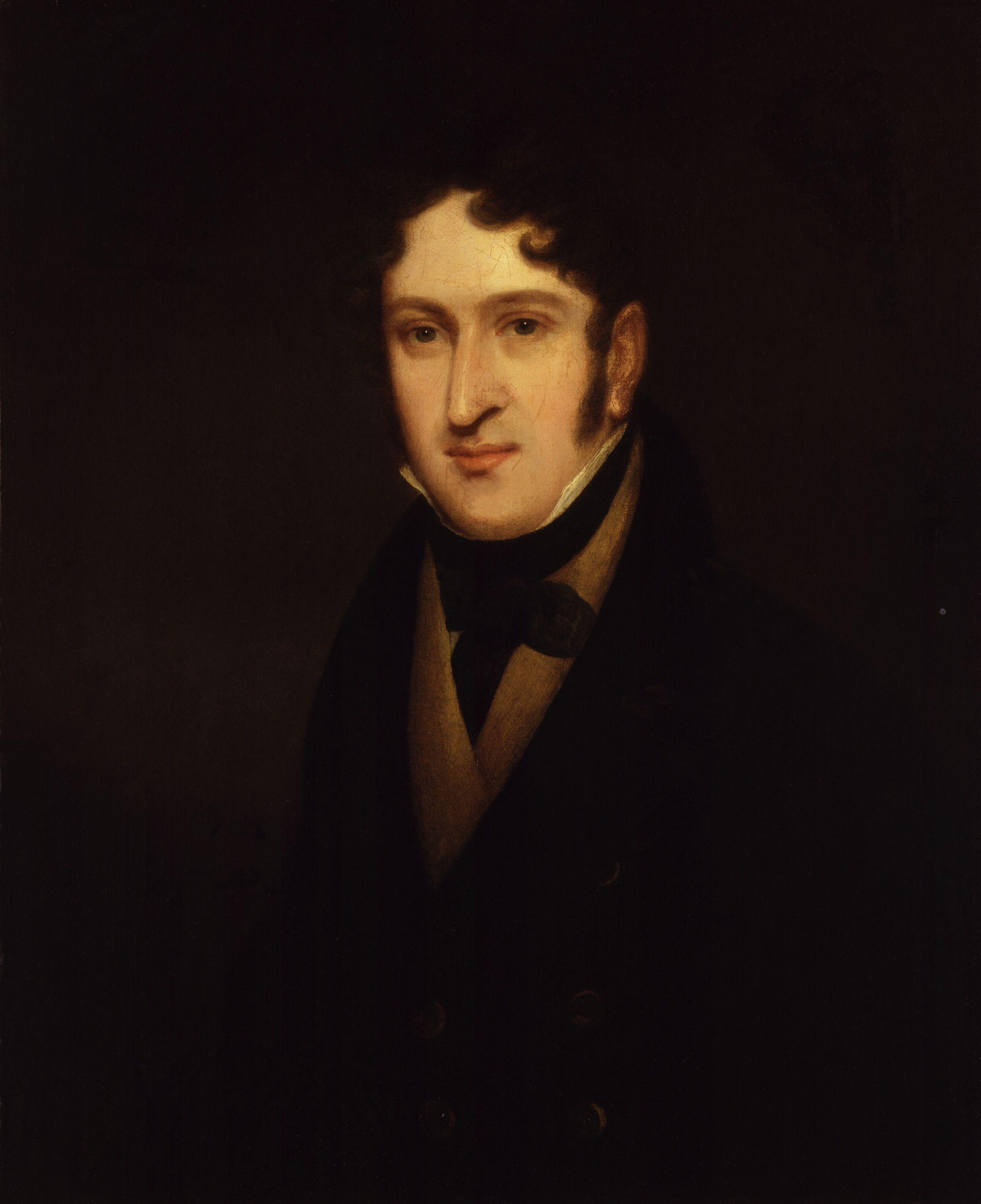
Portrait by Pocock of Henry Bishop

Isaac Pocock (2 March 1782 – 23 August 1835) was an English dramatist and painter of portraits and historical subjects. He wrote melodramas, farces, and light operatic comedies, many being stage adaptations of existing novels. Of his 40 or so works, the most successful was Hit and Miss (1810), a musical farce. The mariner Sir Isaac Pocock (1751–1810) was his uncle.

== Life ==
Isaac Pocock was born in Bristol on 2 March 1782, the eldest son of Nicholas Pocock, marine painter, and Ann Evans (daughter of John Evans of Bristol). William Innes Pocock (1783–1836), a naval officer and author, was his brother. About 1798, Isaac became a pupil of George Romney, with Thomas Alphonso Hayley, son of the writer William Hayley, as a fellow student. After Romney's death in 1802, he studied under Sir William Beechey.

Between 1800 and 1805, Pocock exhibited subject-pictures and portraits at the Royal Academy, London and occasionally showed portraits there over the next 15 years. In 1807, his Murder of St. Thomas à Becket was awarded a prize of £100 by the British Institution. In 1812, Pocock became a member of the Liverpool Academy, and exhibited oils and water-colours there. His last historical painting was an altar-piece for a new chapel at Maidenhead.

In 1818 Pocock inherited some property at Maidenhead after the death of his mariner uncle, Sir Isaac Pocock (1751–1810), and thereafter devoted himself to writing dramas. For some time he lived in London and served in the Royal Westminster Volunteers, rising to the rank of Major. Later he became a Justice of the Peace (JP) and Deputy Lieutenant (DL) for Berkshire, and was an active magistrate.

Pocock died at Ray Lodge, Maidenhead, on 23 August 1835, and was buried in the family vault at Cookham.

== Dramatic works ==
Pocock's first dramatic work was a musical farce in two acts, entitled Yes or No?, produced at the Haymarket Theatre, in London on 31 August 1808, and performed ten times. It received mixed reviews.

It was followed by many similar productions, of which Hit or Miss!, with music by Charles Smith, was by far the most successful, opening at the Lyceum on 26 February 1810, and performed at least 33 times. Its success, it was said, was owed to the performance of Charles Mathews in the character "Dick Cypher". In 1815 Mathews appeared also in Pocock's Mr. Farce-Writer at the Covent Garden Theatre.

Twenty Years Ago, a melodramatic entertainment, was performed at the Lyceum Theatre in 1810. Anything New, with overture and music by Charles Smith, was given on 1 July 1811, but the Green-eyed Monster, produced on 14 October with William Dowton, William Oxberry, and Miss Mellon in the cast, was harshly reviewed. Nevertheless, it was revived at Drury Lane in 1828, when William Farren and Ellen Tree played in it. The music was composed by Thomas Welsh. Shown the next season was a burletta by Pocock called "Harry Le Roy".

Pocock's Miller and his Men, a popular romantic melodrama with music by Henry Bishop, was still playing in 1835. For England Ho!, a melodramatic opera, produced at Covent Garden on 15 December 1813, and acted some 11 times, was published in 1814. John of Paris, a comic opera adapted from the French, was produced at Covent Garden on 12 October 1814, and performed 17 times. Liston played an innkeeper. When revived at the Haymarket in 1826, Lucia Elizabeth Vestris was in the cast. It was again played at Covent Garden in 1835. Zembuca, or the Net-maker, first given at Covent Garden, as "a holiday piece" on 27 March 1815, was played 28 times. The Magpie or the Maid (John Miller, 1815), a drama in three acts, a second edition of which appeared in 1816, was adapted from the French of Louis-Charles Caigniez and Théodore Baudouin d'Aubigny. It was first printed in 1814. "Robinson Crusoe, or the Bold Buccaneers", a romantic drama in two acts, was produced as an Easter piece at Covent Garden in 1817, with Charles Farley in the title rôle and Joseph Grimaldi as Friday. It was published, with remarks by George Daniel, and printed in Lacy's and Dick's Collections. It was revived in 1826.

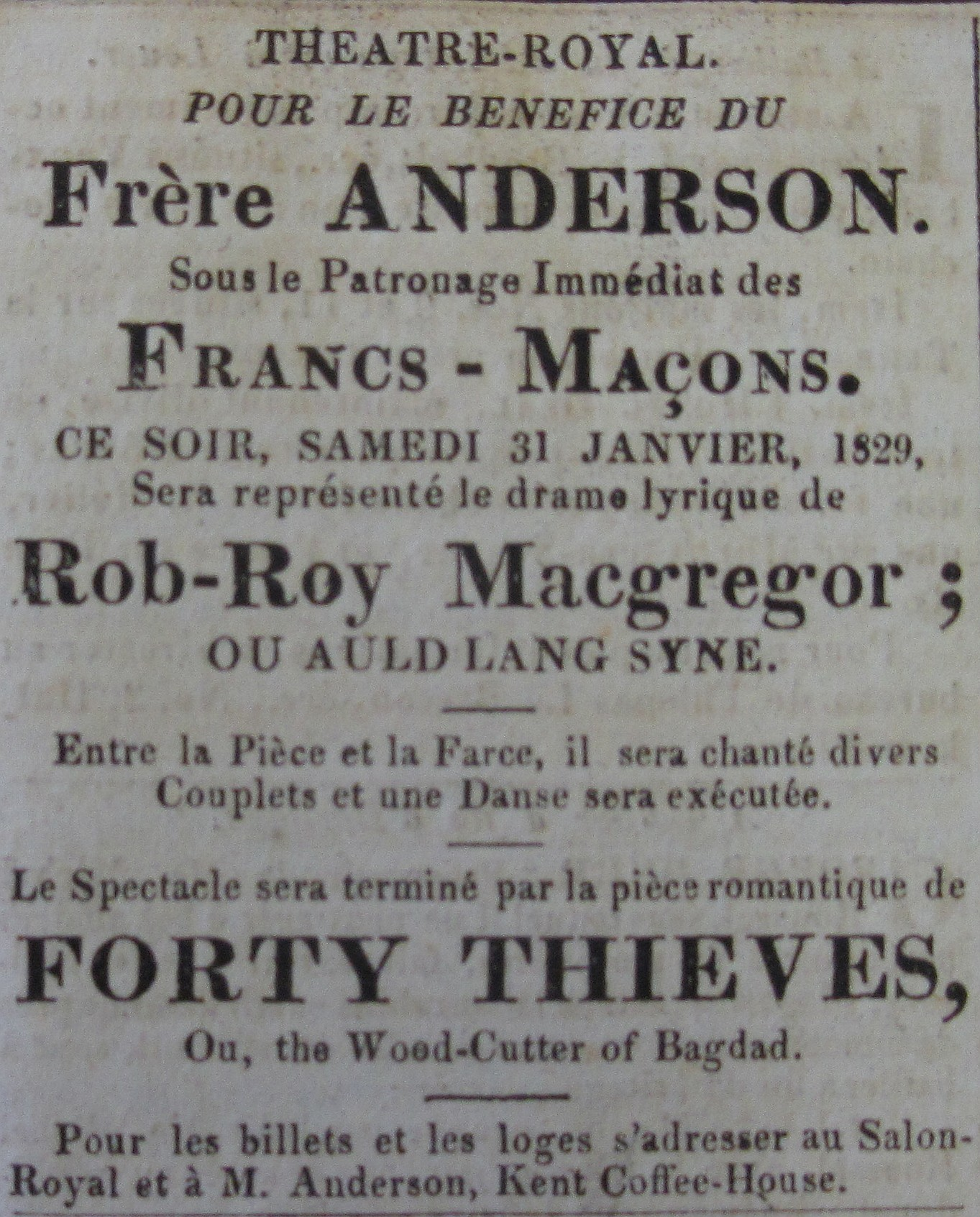
Rob Roy Macgregor, or Auld Lang Syne was performed at the Theatre Royal, Jersey, on 31 January 1829

Pocock later adapted some of the Waverley novels as operatic dramas. On 12 March 1818 his Rob Roy Macgregor, or Auld Lang Syne, an operatic drama in three acts, was first played at Covent Garden. William Charles Macready took the title role, John Liston played Baillie Nicol Jarvie, and Miss Stephens Di Vernon. It was acted 34 times. It was played at Bath, for Farren's benefit, on 15 April 1815, when James Prescott Warde was successful as Rob Roy. In the revival of the following year Farren took Liston's place as the Baillie. This play and Pocock's John of Paris were given together at Bath on the occasion of Warde's farewell to the stage, on 5 June 1820. James William Wallack played in Rob Roy at Drury Lane in January 1826; and Madame Vestris impersonated Di Vernon at the Haymarket in October 1824. The play was published in 1818. Montrose, or the Children of the Mist, three acts, produced at Covent Garden on 14 February 1822, was not so successful, though it was played 19 or 20 times. Liston appeared as Dugald Dalgetty. "Woodstock", five acts, first acted on 20 May 1826, was a comparative failure, though the cast included Charles Kemble and Farren. Peveril of the Peak, three acts, produced on 21 October of the same year, was acted nine times. The Antiquary was also unsuccessful. Home, Sweet Home, or the Ranz des Vaches, a musical entertainment with the music by Henry Bishop, was produced at Covent Garden on 19 March 1829, with Madame Vestris and Keeley in the cast.

Besides these plays, Pocock wrote The Heir of Veroni and The Libertine, operas, in 1817, Husbands and Wives, a farce in 1817, The Robber's Wife, a romantic drama in two acts, adapted from the German in 1829 with music by F. Ries, The Corporal's Wedding, a farce in 1830, The Omnibus, an interlude, in 1831, Country Quarters and The Clutterbucks, farces in 1832, Scan Mag, a farce in 1833, The Ferry and the Mill, a melodrama in 1833, and King Arthur and the Knights of the Round Table, a Christmas equestrian spectacle in 1834–1835. ‘The Night Patrol, a farce, and Cavaliers and Roundheads, an adaptation of Old Mortality, were played posthumously.

== Family ==
Pocock married Louisa Hime in 1812. They had one son, Isaac John Innes Pocock (28 July 1819 – 28 May 1886), who was educated at Eton and Merton College, Oxford (B.A. in 1842), and called to the bar on 19 November 1847. In 1872 he privately published Franklin, and Other Poems. He married, on 4 April 1850, Louisa, second daughter of Benjamin Currey.
