= Keig =

Coordinates: 57.260°N 2.646°W

Keig: Scottish Gaelic: Mon Chaoig
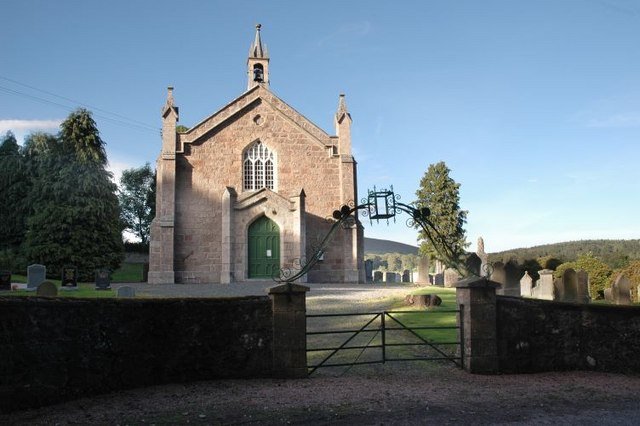
- Keig Church (photo: Gilbert Scott)

- Location within Aberdeenshire
- OS grid reference: NJ611189
- Council area: Aberdeenshire
- Lieutenancy area: Aberdeenshire
- Country: Scotland
- Sovereign state: United Kingdom
- Post town: ALFORD
- Postcode district: AB33
- Dialling code: 01975
- Police: Scotland
- Fire: Scottish
- Ambulance: Scottish
- UK Parliament: Gordon and Buchan
- Scottish Parliament: Aberdeenshire West

Keig (/kiːɡ/ KEEG) is a village within the local government area of Aberdeenshire Council in the North East of Scotland and is located within the Marr area of Aberdeenshire three miles (five kilometres) from Alford. It lies on the B992 road between Insch and the village of Whitehouse.

== Education ==
The village has a Primary School, and it is within the catchment area for Alford Academy, the nearest Secondary School.

== Church ==
Keig has a Church of Scotland church, which is a church included in the Howe Trinity Parish (which also includes Alford and Tullynessle and Forbes).

Keig Parish Church dates from 1834 and has a linked churchyard.

The church was saved from being sold off as a private dwelling in the early 2000s, thanks to a group, the Friends of Keig Kirk, which supports the church to this day.

== Places of interest ==
Keig is located near Castle Forbes, which is the ancestral home of the Clan Forbes family.

The historic Category A listed Bridge of Keig, designed by the architect Thomas Telford, spans the River Don and has views towards Castle Forbes. It is a notable local landmark. In February 2010 the bridge was closed to traffic by Aberdeenshire Council amid fears of structural damage caused by the harsh winter conditions experienced at the end of 2009 and the early part of 2010. Having undertaken major strengthening and repair work, Aberdeenshire Council reopened Keig Bridge on 18 September 2010.

The River Don passes through north Keig (ROK) and South-East Keig.

== Transport ==
The village is served by the 421 bus between Alford and Insch.

== Notable residents ==
- William Robertson Smith and his brother Charles Michie Smith were both born in Keig manse.
