= Grace S. Richmond =

American novelist

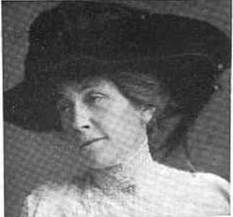
- Grace S. Richmond (circa 1913)
- Born: Grace Louise Smith; March 31, 1866; Pawtucket, Rhode Island, United States
- Died: November 28, 1959 (aged 93); New York, United States
- Occupation: Novelist
- Spouse: Nelson Guernsey Richmond (m. 1887; died 1944)
- Children: 3
- Parents: Charles Edward Smith; Catherine Amelia Kimball

Grace S. Richmond (March 31, 1866 – November 28, 1959) was an American novelist and short-story writer. She began her career writing fiction for popular magazines and became best known for a series of novels featuring the physician Redfield "Red Pepper" Burns, beginning with Red Pepper Burns (1910). Richmond wrote more than 25 books during her career, and by 1931 her novels had sold more than 2.5 million copies.

== Early life and education ==
Richmond was born Grace Louise Smith on March 31, 1866, in Pawtucket, Rhode Island, to Charles Edward Smith and Catherine Amelia (Kimball) Smith. Her father was an author and Baptist clergyman. An only child, she lived in Cincinnati, Ohio; New Haven, Connecticut; and Syracuse, New York as her father moved between congregations. Richmond was educated at Syracuse High School and by private tutors.

== Career ==
Richmond began her writing career by publishing short stories in women's magazines, such as the Women’s Home Companion, Ladies’ Home Journal, and Everybody’s Magazine. Her stories were traditional for the time, featuring strong men and modest women.

Richmond's first novel, The Indifference of Juliet, was published in 1905, after first appearing as a series of stories in the Ladies' Home Journal. Richmond was best known for the series of novels based on the character Redfield Pepper Burns. Redfield Pepper Burns, known as Red Pepper Burns, was a red-haired young physician with a kindly temperament.

By 1914, Richmond's novels had sold approximately 400,000 copies. Colby College later awarded her an honorary Doctor of Literature degree, and by 1931 her novels had sold more than 2.5 million copies. Richmond wrote more than 25 books during her career; her final novel, Bachelor's Bounty, was published in 1932. A modern biography noted she was "one of the most popular and highest paid novelists of the first half of the twentieth century."

== Personal life ==
Richmond married Dr. Nelson Guernsey Richmond in 1887. The couple had two daughters and a son. Richmond died on November 28, 1959. She is buried in the Forest Hill Cemetery in Fredonia, New York.

== Bibliography ==
- The Indifference of Juliet (1905)
- The Second Violin (1906)
- With Juliet in England (1907)
- Round the Corner in Gay Street (1908)
- On Christmas Day in the Morning (1908)
- A Court of Inquiry (1909)
- Red Pepper Burns (1910)
- On Christmas Day in the Evening (1910)
- Strawberry Acres (1911)
- Brotherly House (1912)
- Mrs. Red Pepper (1913)
- The Twenty-Fourth of June: Midsummer's Day (1914)
- The Brown Study (1914)
- Under the Country Sky (1916)
- Red Pepper's Patients (1917)
- Red and Black (1919)
- Foursquare (1922)
- Rufus (1923)
- Red of the Redfields (1924)
- Cherry Square: A Neighborly Novel (1926)
- Lights Up (1927)
- At the South Gate (1928)
- High Fences (1930)
- Red Pepper Returns (1931)
- Bachelor’s Bounty (1932)
