= Christine Shoecraft Smith =

African-American community worker (1866–1945)

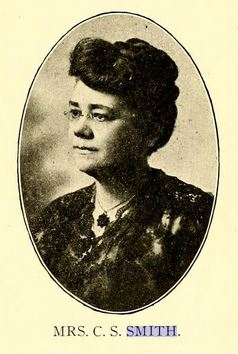
- 1916
- Born: Christine Shoecraft; July 1, 1866; Indianapolis, Marion County, Indiana, U.S.
- Died: 1954 (aged 87–88)
- Other name: Mrs. C. S. Smith
- Occupation: community worker
- Years active: 1883–1950
- Known for: NACWC 13th president

Christine Shoecraft Smith (July 1, 1866 – 1954) was an African-American community worker began her career as the assistant principal of the Alabama State Normal and Industrial School. She married an AME minister, who would become a bishop in the church and assisted him as the manager of the press organ of the Sunday School Union. She worked in many clubs and served as the 13th president of the National Association of Colored Women's Clubs (NACWC).

== Early life ==
Christine Shoecraft was born on July 1, 1866, in Indianapolis, Indiana, to Mary B. and A. R. Shoecraft. When she was two years old, Shoecraft's mother died and she was raised by her father and grandmother. The family moved to Muncie, when Shoecraft was eight. Though she worked at washing, ironing and in domestic labor during her schooling, she graduated from high school when she was 17. With her savings from working, she was able to buy her graduation dress.

== Career ==
Shoecraft was immediately offered a position as assistant principal of the State Normal and Industrial School in Normal, Alabama, serving in that capacity until December, 1887. The following year, in December, 1888, she married Rev. Charles Spencer Smith. Rev. Smith was the founder of the African Methodist Episcopal Church (AME)'s Sunday School Union. It was the largest press owned by African-Americans in the United States. Smith went to work at the press and served as a book-keeper, cashier, and clerk before becoming the assistant manager of the Union, the first woman to hold the post. Her work was not interrupted by the birth of their son, Charles Spencer Smith Jr., and she founded the Women's Club of Nashville in 1896, aligning it with the National Association of Colored Women's Clubs (NACWC). By 1899, Smith was involved with the NACWC and had been elected as its recording secretary. She continued to serve as the assistant manager of the press through 1900, when Rev. Smith became a bishop of the AME Church. His work required him to travel widely, and Smith established a home in Detroit, Michigan.

Smith was elected president of the Michigan State Association of Colored Women and was an executive member of the Detroit branch of the Urban League. In addition, she served on the executive of the Lucy Thurman YWCA branch and was the residential and maintenance secretary of the Detroit YWCA for six years. In 1916, Smith organized the Young People's Department of the AME Church's Women's Parent Mite Missionary Society. In 1923, the year that her husband died, she was elected the first vice president of the Mite Society and in 1931 began serving as president of the organization. In that capacity, she traveled to Kingston, Jamaica several times, to make presentations and assist them in their missionary work. The Mite Society was an organization of women who both did social work in their community and raised funds to pay the salaries of those working as missionaries work abroad and build new churches. She served on the executive of numerous clubs and organizations, such as the United Council of Church Women, the Race Relations Commission of the Federal Council of Churches, the Women's Missionary Society. She was a delegate to all of the biennial meetings of the NACWCShe succeeded Ada Belle Dement as president after Dement's premature death, serving from 1945 to 1948. As president, she traveled widely throughout the United States and made a to Mexico near the end of her term. For several years she had contributed articles to National Notes, the official newsletter of the NACWC, until it was suspended in 1935. Smith revived the publication in 1947 and became its editor-in-chief. Her term ended in 1948 and that same year, she was appointed to the board of the National Council for a Permanent Fair Employment.

== Death and legacy ==
Smith died in 1954. Her papers created during her years of service to the NACWC are housed in a microfilm collection compiled by the Women's Studies Department from the University at Albany, SUNY, Albany, New York.
