= Charlie Smith (English cricketer) =

English cricketer

Benjamin Charles Smith (1859–1942) was an English cricketer active from 1895 to 1906 who played for Northamptonshire. He appeared in 31 first-class matches as a wicketkeeper who was a righthanded batsman. Smith was born in Daventry, Northamptonshire on 10 July 1859 and died in Kingsley, Northamptonshire on 29 November 1942. He claimed 47 first-class victims with four stumpings and he scored 393 runs with a highest score of 38 not out.
