= Ladislav Holý =

Ladislav Holý (1933–1997) was a Czech anthropologist and Africanist of the British school of social anthropology. He combined interpretative approach with methodological individualism, most notably in the Actions, Norms and Representations, co-written with Milan Stuchlik.

== Early life ==
Holý studied anthropology and archaeology at the Charles' University in Prague, Czechoslovakia. There he met his future wife and research partner, Alice Fučíková, who accompanied him on many of his fieldwork trips in Africa. While studying at the university, he also befriended Milan Stuchlík, with whom he was later to publish several books.

== Work & thought ==
In the 1960s he was very much influenced by the British school of social anthropology, notably structural functionalism. Along with Milan Stuchlík, they published a book called Social Stratification in Tribal Africa (1968), which gained much interest in the West as it was based on ideas opposing the current trend of Marxist anthropology. During the 1960s, he visited Sudan several times and as a result published Neighbours and Kinsmen in 1973, which defined his lifelong interest in the study of kinship.

Between the years 1968 and 1972, he embarked on field-trips to the Toka peoples of Zambia. In 1972, Holý realised that independent academic research in Czechoslovakia was now impossible, as the relatively free spirit of the Prague Spring had been quelled by the invading forces of the Warsaw Pact. Consequently, Holý decided not to return home and instead took up Meyer Fortes' recommendation to take up a post at the department of social anthropology at Queen's University Belfast. Milan Stuchlík joined him later on and both anthropologists carried on with their collaborative research until the death of Stuchlík in 1980, publishing, most notably, Actions, Norms and Representations in 1983. The two of them edited four volumes of papers as Queen's University Papers in Social Anthropology, including the one in which they questioned the segmentary lineage system. In 1979 Holý joined the University of St. Andrews in Scotland as a Reader, establishing the Department of Social Anthropology. He became a Professor there in 1987. In the same year, Holý edited a volume on Comparative Anthropology. Perhaps his most notable publication from this period is Religion and Custom in a Muslim Society of 1991, which showed the existence of a form of African Muslim practice, as distinct from the more commonly known Arabic practice.
