= Charles Spencer Smith =

Canadian-American bishop (1852–1923)

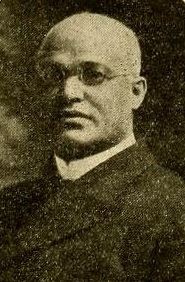
- Smith in 1916

Personal life
- Born: March 16, 1852 Colborne, Canada
- Died: February 1, 1923 (aged 70) Detroit, United States
- Spouse: Katie Josephine Black (m. 1876; died 1885) Christine Shoecraft (m. 1888)
- Children: 3
- Education: Central Tennessee College; Meharry Medical College

Religious life
- Religion: Methodism

Senior posting
- Period in office: Reconstruction era

Charles Spencer Smith (March 16, 1852 – February 1, 1923) was a Canadian-American bishop of the African Methodist Episcopal Church and politician, serving in the Alabama Legislature. He wrote numerous pamphlets during his lifetime, as well as a history of the African Methodist Episcopal Church, and Glimpses of Africa (1895) chronicling his 1894 trip to Africa.

Born and raised in Canada, Smith moved to the United States at age fourteen and after a series of jobs and two years in the Alabama Legislature, he was ordained a minister, serving as a pastor in several southern states before being assigned to the Chicago Conference of the African Methodist Episcopal Church. Exposed to the work of the Sunday School Union there, he proposed that a similar organization be established for the African Methodist Episcopal Church. He founded the organization and the first publishing house in the country owned by a person of African descent using steam presses. After his appointment as Bishop, Smith traveled widely and was assigned conferences in Canada, the Caribbean, Africa, and several in the United States. Upon retiring from conference work, he became the historian of the African Methodist Episcopal Church and wrote at least two books.

== Early life ==
Charles Spencer Smith was born on March 16, 1852 in Colborne, Canada to Nehemiah Henry Smith and his wife, Catherine. He grew up in Bowmanville and attended public schooling there until aged twelve. Apprenticed to learn furniture finishing, he lost his apprenticeship when the factory in which he was employed burned. Smith moved to Buffalo, New York, at the age of fourteen and worked as a general laborer for a boarding house until 1868. Moving to Chicago in that year, he worked as a porter for a barber shop until gaining employment as a deckhand an laborer on the ships working in the Great Lakes region. In 1869, Smith went south to Louisville, Kentucky, to apply for work with the Freedmen's Bureau as a teacher.

== Career ==
Smith's first post was in a school in Louisville, but due to threats from the Ku Klux Klan, he removed to teach in Hopkinsville, Kentucky. Afterwards he taught in Jackson, Mississippi, where he became a minister licensed by the African Methodist Episcopal Church (AME), and then taught at Yazoo City, Meridian, and several county schools in Mississippi. His first mission for the African Methodist Episcopal Church was in 1872 in China Grove, Mississippi. The following year, Smith transferred to the Alabama Conference and was assigned a pastorate in Union Springs, Alabama. He became active in politics and was elected to the 1874 Alabama House of Representatives, during the Reconstruction period, but lost his seat in 1876.

In April 1876, he married Katie Josephine Black in Nashville, Tennessee. The couple had three children, but only Susan Elnora survived. Smith then decided to further his education and attended Central Tennessee College and Meharry Medical College obtaining is medical doctorate in 1880. During his schooling, he was reassigned to the Pittsburgh, Pennsylvania Conference and filled pastoral vacancies at various churches in Pittsburgh.

Completing his medical degree, Smith asked for a transfer to the Illinois Conference and was appointed to Bloomington. While in Illinois, he worked as an agent for the Sunday School Publishing House established in Chicago by David C. Cook, which was affiliated with the Methodist Episcopal Church. The work they were doing impressed him and when he proposed to the council of Bishops that a similar union be established for the African Methodist Episcopal Church. In 1882, Smith founded the Sunday School Union of the African Methodist Episcopal Church in Nashville and served as its treasurer and the corresponding secretary until 1900. He purchased a property, located at 206 Public Square and set up a publishing house. This was the first steam-printing business owned and run by an African American in the country. The Union published two journals, The Child's Recorder and Our Sunday School Review, both of which were edited by Smith. His wife died on July 28, 1885, while visiting her sister in Jackson, Michigan and three years later, in December 1888, Smith married Christine Shoecraft, a teacher, originally from Indiana.

In 1900, Smith became a bishop and was assigned to the Twelfth Episcopal District, which included the Ontario and Nova Scotia Provinces of Canada, Bermuda, Windward Islands, and South America. Later that year, the Louisiana Conferences were also assigned to him. In 1904, he was reassigned to South Africa and two years later to West Africa. At that time Black American missionaries who had traveled to Africa encouraged African-Americans to relocate to Africa, and were respected in their congregations for their firsthand knowledge of African culture. Like other missionaries of that era, Smith did not challenge the prevailing stereotypes of Africa, and promoted apologist narratives of colonialism that blended with aspirations for black emigration from the United States to redeemed Africa. In 1908, Smith was assigned to the Georgia Conference and in 1912, he was assigned to the Texas Conference, before being reassigned to Canada and Bermuda along with Michigan in 1916. Smith traveled extensively, throughout the United States, and in the Caribbean, Europe and Africa, speaking at numerous conferences. He retired in 1920 from conference work and was appointed as the church historiographer.

== Death and legacy ==
Smith died on February 1, 1923, at his home in Detroit, Michigan. His papers, spanning the period from 1875 to 1923 are housed at the Bentley Historical Library in Ann Arbor, Michigan.
