= Charles Smith (English footballer) =

English footballer

Personal information
- Full name: Charles Ford Smith
- Place of birth: Newcastle upon Tyne, England
- Position: Wing half

Senior career*
Years	Team	Apps	(Gls)
1920–1921	Spen Black & White		
1921–1923	Bolton Wanderers	7	(0)
1923–1929	Bournemouth & Boscombe Athletic	173	(6)
Total		180	(6)
- * Club domestic league appearances and goals

Charles Ford Smith was an English footballer who played in the Football League for Bolton Wanderers and Bournemouth & Boscombe Athletic.
