= Charles Smith (cricketer, born 1849) =

English cricketer

Charles John Smith (19 January 1849 – 8 May 1930) was an English cricketer. A right round-arm fast bowler, and lower-order right-hand batsman, Smith made only ten first-class appearances for the Marylebone Cricket Club and for Middlesex between 1867 and 1878, spending the rest of his career in club cricket for Harrow School, Eton, and various Gentlemen's XIs representing England and the North of England. His brother, Arthur Smith, also played cricket for Middlesex.
