= Charles Smith (Australian footballer) =

Australian rules footballer, born 1901

Personal information
- Full name: Charles Smith
- Born: 26 May 1901
- Died: 31 March 1968 (aged 66)

Playing career^{1}
Years	Club	Games (Goals)
1921–22	Richmond	3 (0)
- ^{1} Playing statistics correct to the end of 1922.

Charles Smith (26 May 1901 – 31 March 1968) was a former Australian rules footballer who played with Richmond in the Victorian Football League (VFL).
