= Charles Smith (singer) =

English singer, organist and composer

Charles Smith (1786–1856) was an English singer, known also as an organist, and a composer of theatrical music and songs.

== Life ==
Born in London, he was a grandson of Edward Smith who was page to the Princess Amelia, and son of Felton Smith, a chorister at Christ Church, Oxford. At the early age of five, he became a pupil of Thomas Costellow for singing. Then, in 1796, on the advice of Samuel Arnold, he became a chorister at the Chapel Royal under Edmund Ayrton, where he sang the principal solo in the anthem on the marriage of Charlotte Augusta Matilda, the princess royal, to the Prince of Würtemberg on 18 May 1797.

In 1798, Smith was articled to John Ashley, and in the following year was engaged to sing at Ranelagh Gardens, the Oratorio, and other concerts. In 1803 he went on tour in Scotland, but, his voice having broken, he dropped singing temporarily, and devoted himself to teaching and organ-playing: he acted as deputy for Charles Knyvett and John Stafford Smith at the Chapel Royal and for James Bartleman at Croydon Chapel. On Bartleman's retirement, Smith was appointed organist there; but shortly afterwards he went to Ireland with a theatrical party as tenor singer, and on his return, a year later, he became organist of the Welbeck Chapel in succession to Charles Wesley junior.

With Isaac Pocock, Smith next turned his attention to writing for the theatre, and produced in rapid succession the music to the farces Yes or No!, produced at the Haymarket Theatre on 31 August 1808, Hit or Miss, produced at the Lyceum Theatre on 26 February 1810, Anything New, produced on 1 July 1811, and Knapschou, The Forest Fiend, a melodrama. He withdrew from theatrical work when Pocock left Drury Lane.

In 1813, Smith was singing bass parts at the Oratorio concerts; in 1815 he married a Miss Booth of Norwich; and in 1816 went to fill a lucrative post at Liverpool. He ultimately retired to Crediton in Devon, where he died on 22 November 1856.

== Works ==
Some of Smith's compositions enjoyed a vogue, the most popular being a setting of Thomas Campbell's Battle of Hohenlinden.
