= Charles Forster Smith =

American classical philologist

- Born: June 30, 1852; Abbeville County, South Carolina, U.S.
- Died: August 3, 1931 (aged 79); Racine, Wisconsin, U.S.
- Occupation: Classical philologist

Charles Forster Smith (June 30, 1852, in Abbeville County, South Carolina – August 3, 1931, in Racine, Wisconsin) was an American classical philologist, who focused on the ancient Greek historian Thucydides.

== Life ==
Charles Forster Smith, the son of Pastor James F. Smith and his wife Julia Forster Smith, studied at Wofford College (BA 1872), Harvard University and then from 1874 to 1875 at the universities in Leipzig and Berlin. He then taught as a professor of Classical and German Philology at Wofford College (1875-1879). In 1881 completed a PhD at Leipzig University.

After completing his doctorate, Smith worked at various universities in the United States: from 1881 as Professor of Latin and Greek at Williams College, from 1882 as Professor of Modern Foreign Languages at Vanderbilt University and from 1884 as Professor of Greek, and from 1894 professor of classical philology, at the University of Wisconsin–Madison. He was a longstanding board member of the American Philological Association, and president of the Association in 1902/03. In 1905/06 he was co-editor of The Classical Journal. He retired in 1917, but remained scientifically and journalistically active. In 1919, his colleagues published a commemorative publication in his honor at the University of Wisconsin.

In his research, Smith dealt with both ancient languages and modern language phenomena (for example, the dialect of the Southern States). Throughout his life, he endeavored to improve higher education in the United States, which had only enabled higher degrees in a few places during his own time as a student. Smith's research focus was the Greek historian Thucydides, about whom he published scientific essays, selected editions, and finally a bilingual (Greek-English) edition in the Loeb Classical Library (1919-1923), which remained in use for a long time.

== Publications (selection) ==
- A Study of Plutarch's Life of Artaxerxes, with Especial Reference to the Sources. Leipzig, 1881 (dissertation)
- Thucydides Book VII. Boston, 1886
- Thucydides Book III. Boston, 1894
- with Campbell Bonner: Xenophon's Anabasis. The First Four Books. New York, 1905 Greek literature. New York, 1912
- Charles Kendall Adams: a life sketch. Madison, 1924

=== Translations ===
- Gustav Hertzberg: Ancient Greece. Philadelphia/New York, 1902
- Thucydides. 4 volumes, London/New York, 1919-1923 (Loeb Classical Library)

=== Literature ===
- Classical Studies in Honor of Charles Forster Smith. Madison, 1919
- Ward W. Briggs: Smith, Charles Forster. In: Ward W. Briggs (ed.); Biographical Dictionary of North American Classicists. Westport, CT/London: Greenwood Press, 1994 ISBN 978-0-313-24560-2, pp. 593f.
