= Charlie Smith (Romani poet) =

British Romanichal poet (1956–2005)

Chair of The Gypsy Council for Education, Welfare and Civil Rights
- In office 1990–2005
- Preceded by: Peter Mercer
- Succeeded by: Joe G. Jones

Labour Party Councillor for Cedar Hall Ward, Castle Point Borough Council
- In office 1995–2003

The Deputy Mayor of Castle Point Borough Council
- In office 2001–2002
- Succeeded by: Liz Brett

The Mayor of Castle Point Borough Council
- In office 2002–2003
- Preceded by: Liz Brett
- Succeeded by: Chris Freeman

Commission Member of the Commission for Racial Equality
- In office April 2004 – November 2005

Personal details
- Born: Charles Stephen Smith; 20 June 1956 Rochford, Essex, United Kingdom
- Died: 8 November 2005 (aged 49) Thundersley, Essex, United Kingdom
- Party: Labour
- Spouse: Elaine Loveridge (m. 1979, divorced)
- Domestic partner: George Wilson
- Children: 1
- Occupation: Poet; activist; politician
- Known for: First Romani Mayor in the UK
- Writing career
- Period: c.1980–2005

Charles Stephen Smith (20 June 1956 – 8 November 2005) was a British Romanichal poet, activist and politician.

== Early life ==
Charles Stephen Smith was born on the 20 June 1956 in Rochford, Essex to Charles Smith and Peggy Smith, née Livermore. Smith's father was a popular tailor within the English Romani community. Smith had two sisters.

Smith grew up in Hadleigh as part of the Southend-on-Sea Romani community. Leaving school at age 14–15, Smith believed himself to be illiterate.

== Career ==
In the early 1970s Smith began selling antiques, specialising in early radio sets and fine bone china.

=== Political career and activism ===
In the early 1980s, Smith joined the National Gypsy Education Council, and in 1990 succeed Peter Mercer as Chair. Smiths leadership was characterised by moves towards NGO-isation, and was emblematic of the larger shift towards professionalisation within the British Roma Civil Rights Movement. Renamed as the Gypsy Council for Education, Welfare and Civil Rights, Smith remained Chair until his death in 2005.

Smith was a member of the Labour party, and from 1995–2003 was the Labour Party Councillor for Cedar Hall Ward, Castle Point Borough Council. Smith was a member of the Labour Party Campaign for Travellers' Rights (LCTR). Following the death of Arthur Stevens Smith became Deputy Mayor of Castle Point Borough Council in 2001. in 2002 became the Mayor of Castle Point Borough Council, making Smith the first Romani Mayor in the UK.

Together with Janie Codona MBE, Smith represented the Gypsy and Traveller Law Reform Coalition during the fourteenth session of the Joint Committee On Human Rights. From April 2004 until his death, Smith was a commission member of the Commission for Racial Equality.

=== Poetry, film and literacy career ===
Smith began writing poetry in the 1980s. Smith had two books of poetry published, The Spirit of the Flame (c.1990) and Not all Waggons and Lanes (1995).

From its 2002 inception Smith was on the board of directors of the International Romani Writers' Association (Finnish: Kansainvälinen Romanikirjailijaliitto).

Smith collaborated with Jeremy Sandford on the 1995 film 'Spirit of the Gypsies'. Following the completion of his Mayoral term, Smith directed the documentary Footsteps in the Sand about the annual Romany festival in Saintes-Maries-de-la-Mer, Camargue for the Gypsy Council.

== Personal life ==
In 1979, Smith married Elaine Loveridge and moved to Thundersley. Smith and Loveridge had one son before later divorcing.

In 1995, Smith was diagnosed with leukaemia, and subsequently lived with cancer for 10 years. Smith lived openly with his partner George Wilson, who cared for Smith in his final years.

== Publications ==
- Smith, Charlie S., (1987). "God is a Gypsy". In Binns, Dennis (ed.). Gavvered all around : A collection of Gypsy poetry.^{α} Manchester: Travellers Education Service.
- Smith, Charlie. (c.1990) The Spirit of the Flame: Poems. Manchester: Abbott C.P. School; Manchester: Travellers Education Service.
- Smith, Charles. (1995) Not all Waggons and Lanes: Poems. Essex: Essex County Council.
- Smith, Charlie.(1998). "Up the chimneys". In Hancock, Ian; Dowd, Siobhan; Djuric, Rajko (eds.). The Roads of the Roma: a PEN anthology of Gypsy writers (1 ed.). Hatfield: University of Hertfordshire Press. pp. 101–102. ISBN 978-0-900458-90-3.
- (2004) Footsteps in the Sand. The Gypsy Council for Education, Welfare and Civil Rights (Film)
- Acton, Thomas, and Andrew Ryder (2014). "Charles Smith: The Fashioning of an Activist". In Ryder, Andrew; Cemlyn, Sarah; Acton, Thomas (eds.) Hearing the Voices of Gypsy, Roma and Traveller Communities: Inclusive Community Development. Bristol: Bristol University Press. pp. 67–82

== Notes ==
^α Also called Gavvered all around : an anthology of thirty poems written by ten Gypsy poets
