= Charles Michie Smith =

Scottish astronomer

Professor Charles Michie Smith CIE FRSE FRAS (13 July 1854–27 September 1922) was a Scottish astronomer. He founded the Kodaikanal Solar Observatory in the mountains of south India and served as its first director.

== Life ==
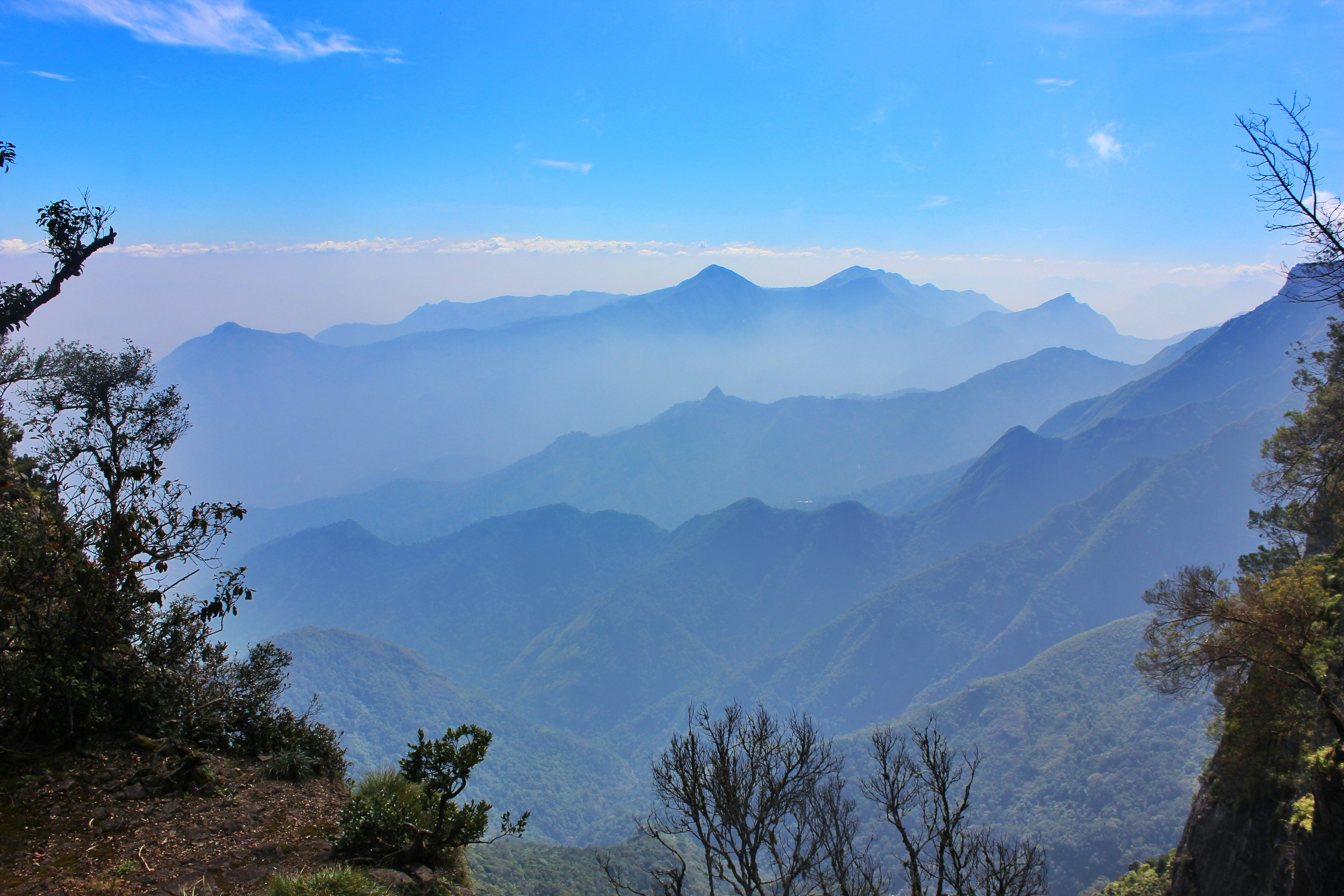
the mountains of Kodaikanal

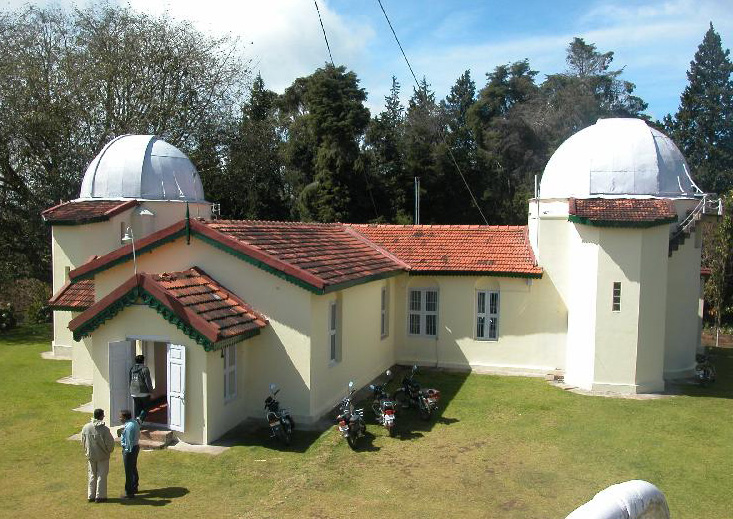
Kodaikanal Solar Observatory

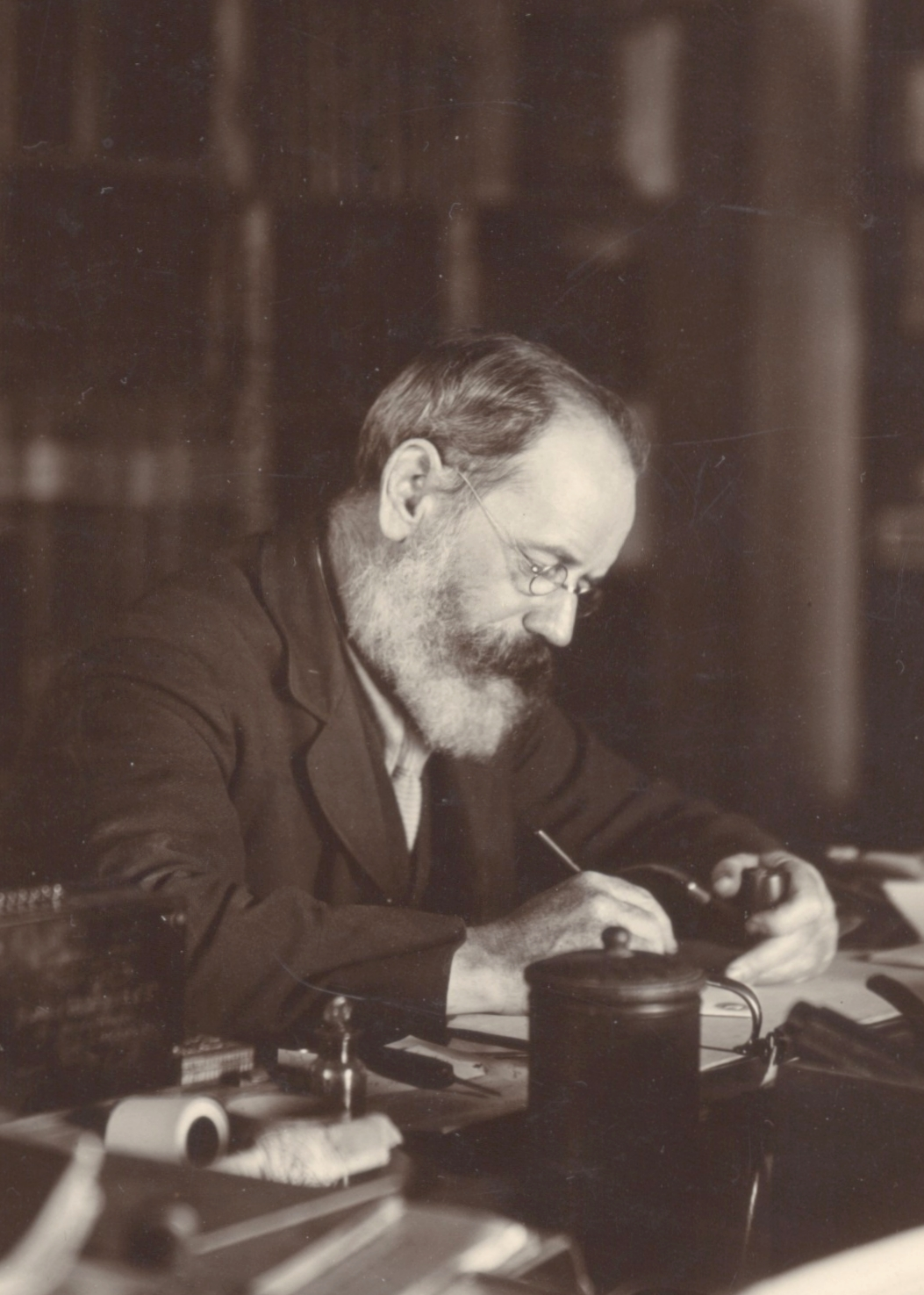
Charles Michie Smith in India at his desk

Smith was born in Keig in Aberdeenshire on 13 July 1854 the son of Jane Robertson and Rev William Pirrie Smith of the newly created Free Church of Scotland.

He was educated locally then went to first the University of Aberdeen then the University of Edinburgh to study mathematics and physics, graduating BSc in 1876. His tutors included Peter Guthrie Tait and George Chrystal. He almost immediately obtained a post as Professor of Physics at Madras Christian College and began in this role in the summer of 1877 aged 23.

In 1882 he was elected a Fellow of the Royal Society of Edinburgh. His proposers were Alexander Crum Brown, Peter Guthrie Tait, George Chrystal and William Thomson, Lord Kelvin. In 1884 he was elected a Fellow of the Royal Astronomical Society.

In 1891 he left Madras Christian College to become Government Astronomer for Madras, replacing his recently deceased friend, the Government Astronomer N. R. Pogson, whose valuable meteorology he published in 1892. In 1899 he edited and published Pogson's New Madras General Catalogue (of Stars) listing 5303 stars visible from the observatory. He left this role in 1899 to become the first Director of the Kodaikanal Solar Observatory.

Smith retired from his Directorship in 1911, but continued to live at Kodaikanal. He died at his home there on 27 September 1922 and is buried locally with his spinster sister Lucy Smith, who joined him in later life. Smith was succeeded by his assistant John Evershed as observatory director.

== Publications ==
- The Green Sun (1883)
- The Remarkable Sunsets (1884)
- The Green Flash at Sunset (1890)
- Annular Eclipse of the Sun (1894)
- The Kodaikanal Solar Physics Observatory in India (1895)
- Observations of the Leonids (1899)
- A Solar Outburst and a Magnetic Storm (1909)
- Observations of Halley's Comet (1910, with John Evershed)

== Family ==
He was unmarried and had no children.

His older brother was William Robertson Smith.
