= Charles H. Smith (American football) =

American football player

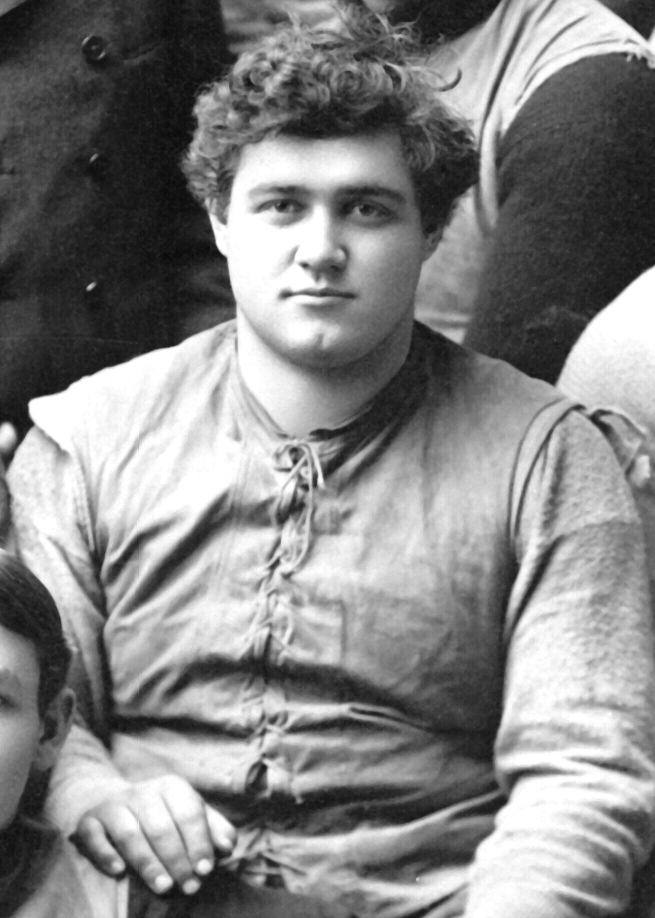
- Smith cropped from 1893 Michigan team photograph

Michigan Wolverines
- Position: Center

Career information
- College: Michigan (1893–1894)

Charles H. "Fatty" Smith was an American football center who played for the University of Michigan Wolverines football team in 1893 and 1894. Smith stood 5 feet, 10 inches, and weighed 230 pounds in 1893. The 1894 Michigan team outscored opponents 244-84 and compiled a record of 9-1-1, including wins over Cornell University and the University of Chicago. Michigan's 1894 victory over Cornell marked the first victory by a Western football school against one of the Eastern schools. Up to that point, no Western player had been selected for the annual College Football All-America Teams selected by Eastern football authorities, Caspar Whitney and Walter Camp. Smith was the standout star of Western football in 1894, and Western football enthusiasts lobbied for Smith to be selected as an All-American. Whitney and Camp declined the suggestion, and no Western football players were selected as All-Americans until 1898 when Clarence Herschberger and William Cunningham received the honors. The resistance to selecting Smith (or any other Western player) as an All-American is reflected in the following newspaper account from December 1894:

Some of the western colleges have developed great players on their teams and this year may claim for them a position on the All American team. Notably the University of Michigan claims for their center "Fatty" Smith the supremacy in his position. But the western institutions have not yet mastered the eastern knowledge of all the details and fine points of the game. Smith has made a great record against the west and even against Cornell, but the Ithacan center was not a master of his position. When brought to face a man like the Stillman of today or the Bulliet of last year, Smith would simply be lost and entirely out generaled. So it would be with all of the claimants for line positions from western teams. And no one claims for a moment that western back field men could play in the same class with eastern men.
