= Charles Edward Smith (Baptist) =

American Baptist author (1835–1929)

Charles Edward Smith (January 22, 1835 – September 9, 1929) was an American author and Baptist ecclesiologist and apologist. He was the pastor of Fredonia, New York's Baptist Church from 1885 to 1900. Many of his sermons, works, and manuscripts were published posthumously.

== Personal background ==
Smith was born on January 22, 1835, in Fall River, Massachusetts, the son of Philip and Roby Smith. He attended the University of Rhode Island, graduating in 1860. He was a member of the Alpha Delta Phi and Phi Beta Kappa fraternities. He was ordained on August 1, 1863, and earned his doctorate of divinity in 1891. On February 17, 1864, Smith married Catherine Amelia Kimball. They were the parents of Grace Louise Smith, who was married to Dr. Nelson Guernsey Richmond. Grace was an American romance novelist, known for writing 27 books. She was known professionally as Grace S. Richmond. Smith died in Fredonia, New York, on September 9, 1929.

== Professional background ==
Following his ordination, Smith accepted his first pastorate at the First Baptist Church in Pawtucket, serving from 1863 to 1868. He then moved on to Cincinnati, serving for two years at Mount Auburn Church. Following his pastorate in Cincinnati, he relocated to Fulton, Oswego County, New York, where he served with the Fulton Baptist Church for two years. In 1871, he accepted a pastorate at Calvary Baptist Church in New Haven, Connecticut, where he remained for four years, after which he was transferred to the First Baptist Church in Syracuse, serving the congregation through 1882. Smith returned to his profession in business until 1885, when he accepted his final pastorate at Fredonia Baptist Church, where he served for 15 years before retiring and serving as pastor emeritus with the church.

== Published works ==
- Smith, Charles Edward. The Baptism In Fire: The Privilege And Hope Of The Church In All Ages, (originally published Boston: D. Lothrop and company, 1883), Nabu Press, 2012. ISBN 978-1276527606
- Smith, Charles Edward. The World Lighted: A Study Of The Apocalypse, (originally published New York: Funk & Wagnalls, 1890), Nabu Press, 2012. ISBN 978-1286415962
- Smith, Charles Edward. The Facts of Faith, (originally published Boston: Sherman, French, 1910), Kessinger Publishing, 2010. ISBN 978-1169101012
- Smith, Charles Edward. Commitment, the Cement of Love, Broadman Press, 1982. ISBN 978-0805456516
