= Charles Emrys Smith =

British economist and educator

Dr. Charles Smith (a.k.a. Carlos Smith Brocca) was Head of Curriculum and Quality in Swansea School of Education at Swansea Metropolitan University (part of the University of Wales), and following its merger with University of Wales Trinity Saint David was Senior Quality Manager and member of the Senior Leadership Team of the Faculty of Humanities at Swansea. He was previously Senior Lecturer in Economics at the Swansea Business School.

Author/co-author of Economic Development (Palgrave), International Trade and Globalisation (Anforme), Revision Express Economics (Pearson-Longman) and many academic and journalistic articles in the fields of economics and business education, devolution, regional development and European integration.

His research specialized in comparative politics and economics of Wales and Catalonia, education, training and employment. He has also contributed to the Encyclopedia of Business in Today's World. He has often broadcast on regional television and radio in an 'expert' role on economic and political matters.

Smith gained national standing as an educational assessor an examiner and curriculum developer. During the 1990s he was a Chief Examiner with a leading international education foundation and undertook teacher training workshops and conferences in more than 20 countries spanning five continents. He was subsequently Chief Examiner in Economics with a major UK awarding body. He has also been a consultant for the UK government's Qualifications and Curriculum Development Agency (QCDA), an adviser to the Welsh Assembly Government (member of the Wales Employment Advisory Panel) and a member of the economic council of Britain in Europe.

He attained a Fellowship of the Higher Education Academy, and was among the first group of educators to become a Fellow of the Chartered Institute of Educational Assessors.

Smith retired from full-time teaching in 2014, but maintained a consultancy role, particularly with international Higher Education partnerships with private sector universities run by educational foundations in Spain. He is active in politics, and was a Labour Party councillor on a South Wales unitary authority county council, where his responsibilities as a Cabinet Member included Education, Regeneration and Economic Development.

Since 2016 he has focused on working with others towards reversing what he regards as the "Disaster of Brexit", as Chair of Bridgend for Europe, Chair of Wales for Europe, and a member of the National Council and Board of Directors of the European Movement UK.

With effect from April 2026 he is Co-Editor-in-Chief of Bylines Cymru, part of the Bylines Network.

He is a grandson of Spanish pacifist José Brocca, whom he cites as an influence on his support for peaceful European integration.

== Books ==
- Charles Smith, Tina Isaacs, Catherine Zara, Graham Herbert, Steven J. Coombs. Key Concepts in Educational Assessment London: Sage Publications, 2013. 161 pages. ISBN 978-1-4462-1056-7 (hardback). ISBN 978-1-44621057-4 (pbk).
- Smith, Charles. International Trade and Globalisation 2nd ed. Stocksfield: Anforme, 2004. Previous ed.: published as Understanding International Trade. Third edition, spring 2007. ISBN 1-905504-10-1; Fourth Edition, spring 2010; Fifth edition 2012. ISBN 978-1-905504-69-5.
- Smith, Charles. Economic Development, Growth and Welfare, Basingstoke: Macmillan, 1994. 163p. ISBN 0-333-59267-0 (cased). ISBN 0-333-59268-9 (pbk). Second edition (with Gareth Rees) published as Economic Development, Basingstoke: Palgrave, 1998. ISBN 0-333-72228-0.
- Charles Smith, Matthew Smith, Ian Etherington. Revision Express Economics, Harlow: Longman Education/ Pearson, 2006. 184 pages. ISBN 1-4058-0745-8. Second edition: 2008.
- Charles Smith, Brinley Davies, Geoff Hale, Henry Tiller. Investigating Economics, Basingstoke: Macmillan, 1996. 838 pages. ISBN 0-333-63808-5.
- Charles Smith, Barry Harrison, Brinley Davies. Introductory Economics, Basingstoke: Macmillan, 1992. 399 pages. ISBN 0-333-54294-0
- Charles Smith UK Trade and Sterling in the Studies in the UK Economy series, edited by Bryan Hurl. Oxford: Heinemann, 1992. 89 pages. ISBN 0-435-33016-0.
- C.E.Smith and A.J. Grabham. Data-Response Exercises for GCSE Business Studies Cheltenham: Stanley Thornes, 1989, 104 pages. ISBN 0-7487-0162-1.
