= Ibar of Beggerin =

Saint Ibar of Beggerin
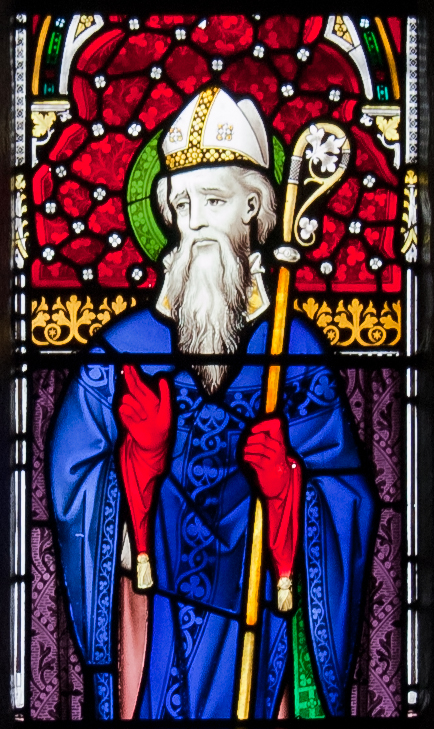
- St. Ibar, Church of the Assumption, Our Lady's Island, Wexford
- Died: 23 April 500
- Feast: 23 April
- Patronage: Beggerin Island, Wexford

Ibar mac Lugna, whose name is also given as Iberius (/aɪˈbɪəriəs/ eye-BEER-ee-əs) or Ivor, was an early Irish saint, patron of Beggerin Island, and bishop. The saint is sometimes said to have been one of the "Quattuor sanctissimi Episcopi" ("The four most sacred bishops") said to have preceded Saint Patrick in Ireland (see also the saint Ailbe, Ciarán and Déclán), although possibly they were just contemporaries. His feast day is 23 April.

== Life ==
According to the Annals of the Four Masters, Ibar was of noble birth and descended from the tribe of Ui Echach who occupied east County Down. His sister Mella married Hua-Carbmiac, king of Hy-Kensellagh, a kingdom which consisted of all current county Wexford and a considerable part of Wicklow and Carlow.

Much obscurity attaches to his early training, but it is said that his early education took place in an important druidic school. When followers of Martin of Tours began to appear in Ireland, Ibar travelled to Armorica to learn more of this new teaching. He spent some time at Lérins Abbey where he must have met Ciarán of Saigir.

When Ibar returned from Lérins, he was accompanied by some companions, who constituted the first community that Ibar established on one of the Aran Islands in Galway Bay on the west coast of Ireland. But his stay in the West did not last very long, for he moved his monastery to plain Geshille in County Offaly. He then settled at Beggerin, where he built an oratory and cell. In the Life of Saint Abbán it is stated that Saint Ibar's retreat was soon peopled with numerous disciples from all parts of Ireland, and the 'Litany of Aengus' invokes the three thousand confessors who placed themselves under Ibar's direction.

Although at first not disposed to yield to Saint Patrick (or his successors), he afterwards submitted and became his disciple. However, accounts of this may originate in the interest of Armagh to claim precedence over the other religious centres in Ireland, which could also demonstrate early bishops.

Ibar's nephew, St Abbán, as a boy of twelve, came to Beggerin in Ibar's old age and accompanied him to Rome. Moninne is said to have travelled to Leinster to become the disciple of St Ibar before founding her monastery in Killeavy.

He preached in the present County Wexford. Ibar's death has been chronicled in the year 500 on 23 April, on which day his feast is observed.

== Legacy ==
Ibar is regarded as the patron of Beggerin Island (Begerin), in Wexford harbour. (Although Beggerin was formerly an island in the north of Wexford harbour, it has long since been reclaimed). He is also to patron saint of the town of Wexford.

The Church of Ireland church in Wexford town is named St Iberius' Church, and is believed to be built upon a site Ibar used for an oratory.

He also gives his name to St. Ibar's–Shelmaliers Camogie Club, a camogie team based in Wexford Town.
