= St Iberius' Church =

Church in Wexford, Ireland

St. Iberius' Church
- Church of Saint Iberius
- Teampall Iúir
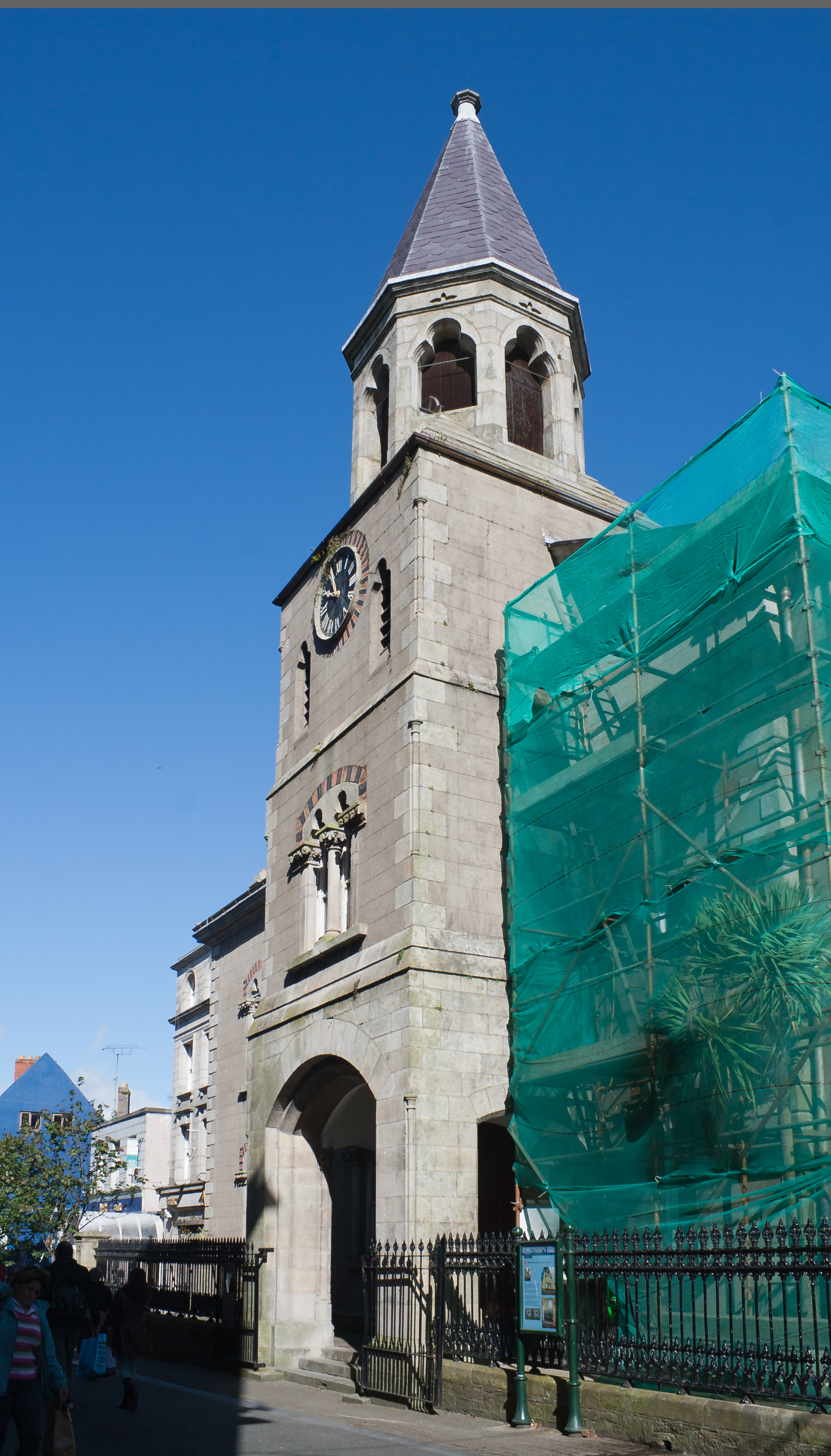
- Spire

- Location in Ireland
- 52°20′21″N 6°27′44″W
- Location: North Main Street, Wexford
- Country: Ireland
- Denomination: Church of Ireland

History
- Status: In use
- Dedication: Ibar of Beggerin

Architecture
- Architect: John Roberts
- Architectural type: Church
- Style: Georgian, Gothic Revival, Renaissance Revival
- Groundbreaking: 1660
- Completed: 1766

Specifications
- Length: 19 m (62 ft)
- Width: 27.5 m (90 ft)
- Materials: granite, cast iron, brick, cement, wrought iron, timber, lead, stained glass, serpentine, plaster

Administration
- Province: Dublin and Cashel
- Diocese: Cashel, Ferns and Ossory
- Parish: Wexford and Kilscoran Union

Clergy
- Rector: Rev Norman McCausland

St. Iberius' Church (/aɪˈbɪəriəs/ eye-BEER-ee-əs) is an 18th-century Protestant church in the centre of Wexford, Ireland, dedicated to Saint Ibar of Beggerin (Iberius). Designed by John Roberts, the interior is Georgian in style, while the exterior is Renaissance Revival. It is a protected structure.

== Building history ==
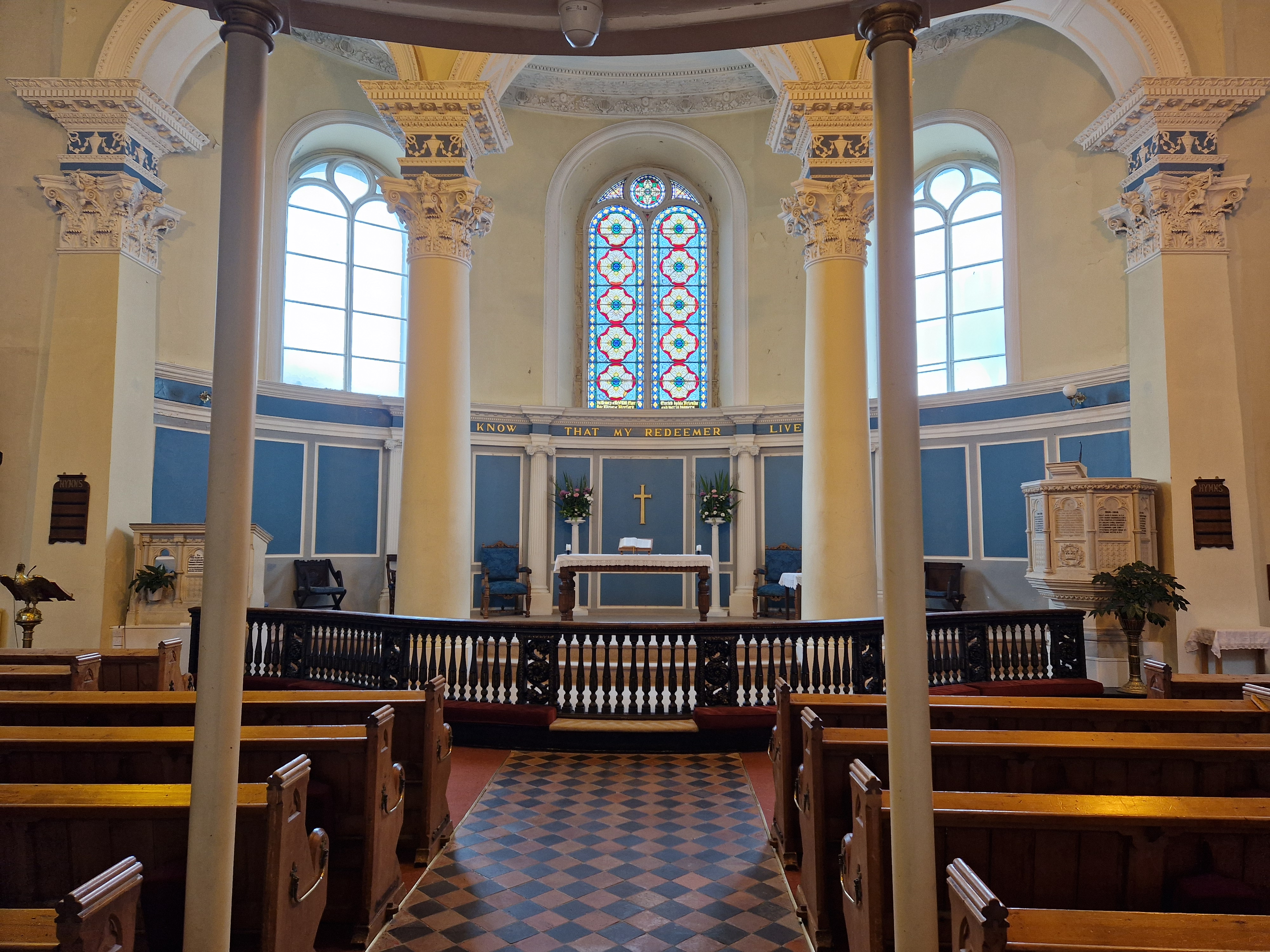
Church interior

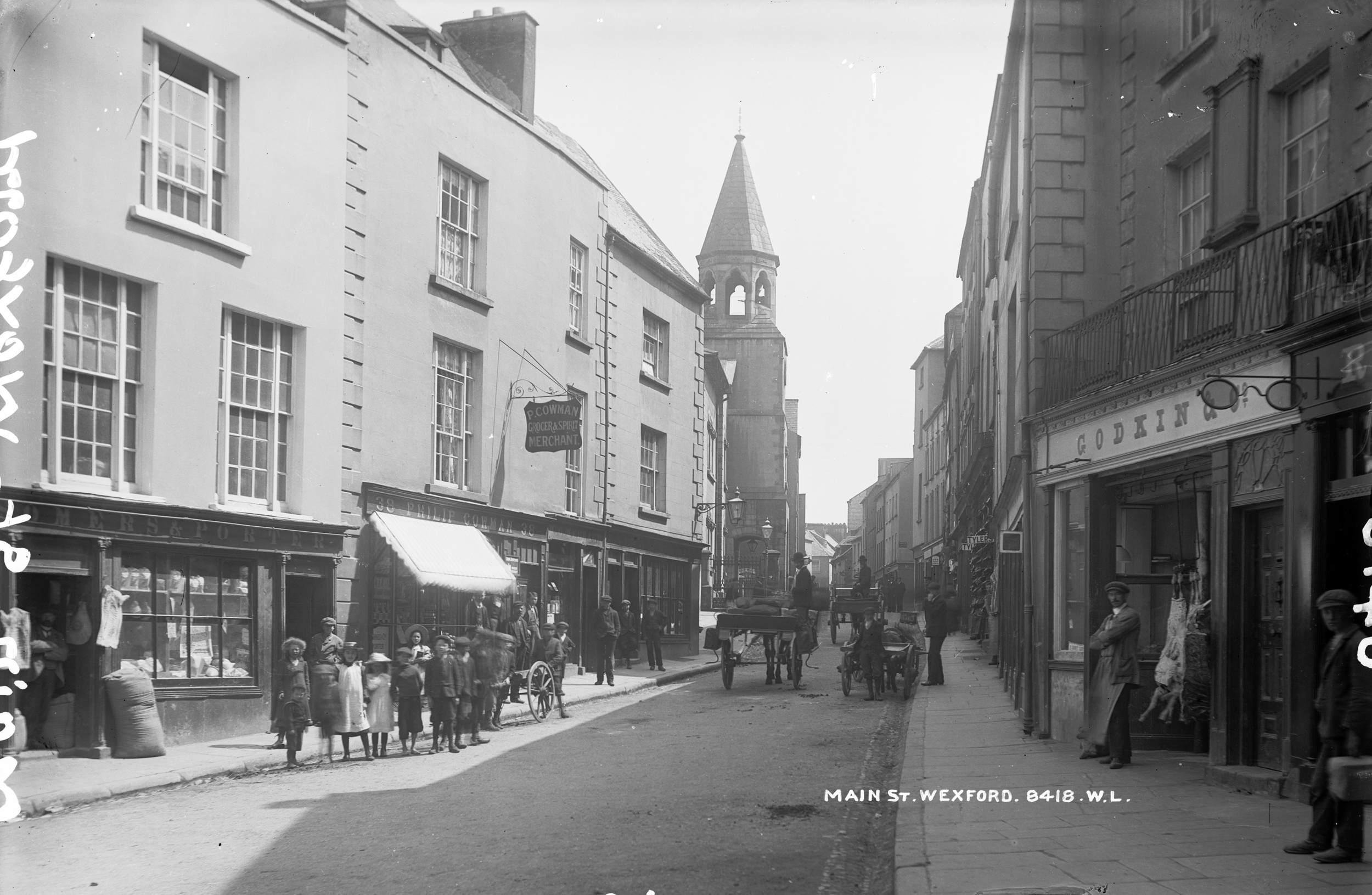
View of the church from the west, c. 1895

It is believed that there was an earlier (Pre-Reformation Catholic) church on the site dedicated to local saint Ibar of Beggerin. The current building is believed to date from some time after the Restoration of King Charles II in 1660. In 1690, the Rector of St Iberius, Alexander Allen, accused then Mayor of Wexford, Edward Wiseman, of inciting vandals to demolish the altar and pews and steal vestments and books. St. Iberius' was rebuilt in 1760–66 to a Georgian style. A cast iron bell in the church is dated "1816."

John Elgee, grandfather of the poet Jane "Speranza" Wilde (herself mother of Oscar Wilde), was curate and rector at St. Iberius'.

The church is built to a cruciform plan and is wider than it is long (supposedly to fit next to the old town walls), with an upper gallery which was used originally to seat Wexford's large population of soldiers. The building was refronted some time around 1882, producing the present facade. The organ was installed in 1893. In 1930, a prayer desk was added in memory of Dr Thomas Dowse.

Restoration work took place in 1990, with balustraded serpentine communion rails being moved to St Iberius from St. George's Church, Dublin. The tower with octagonal spire is inspired by Venetian Renaissance architecture.

St Iberius is known for its excellent acoustics and is commonly used for concerts. In 1996 a Russian pianist won a Kawai grand piano in a competition, but rather than bring the piano back home, he sold it to St Iberius'.

=== Gallery ===
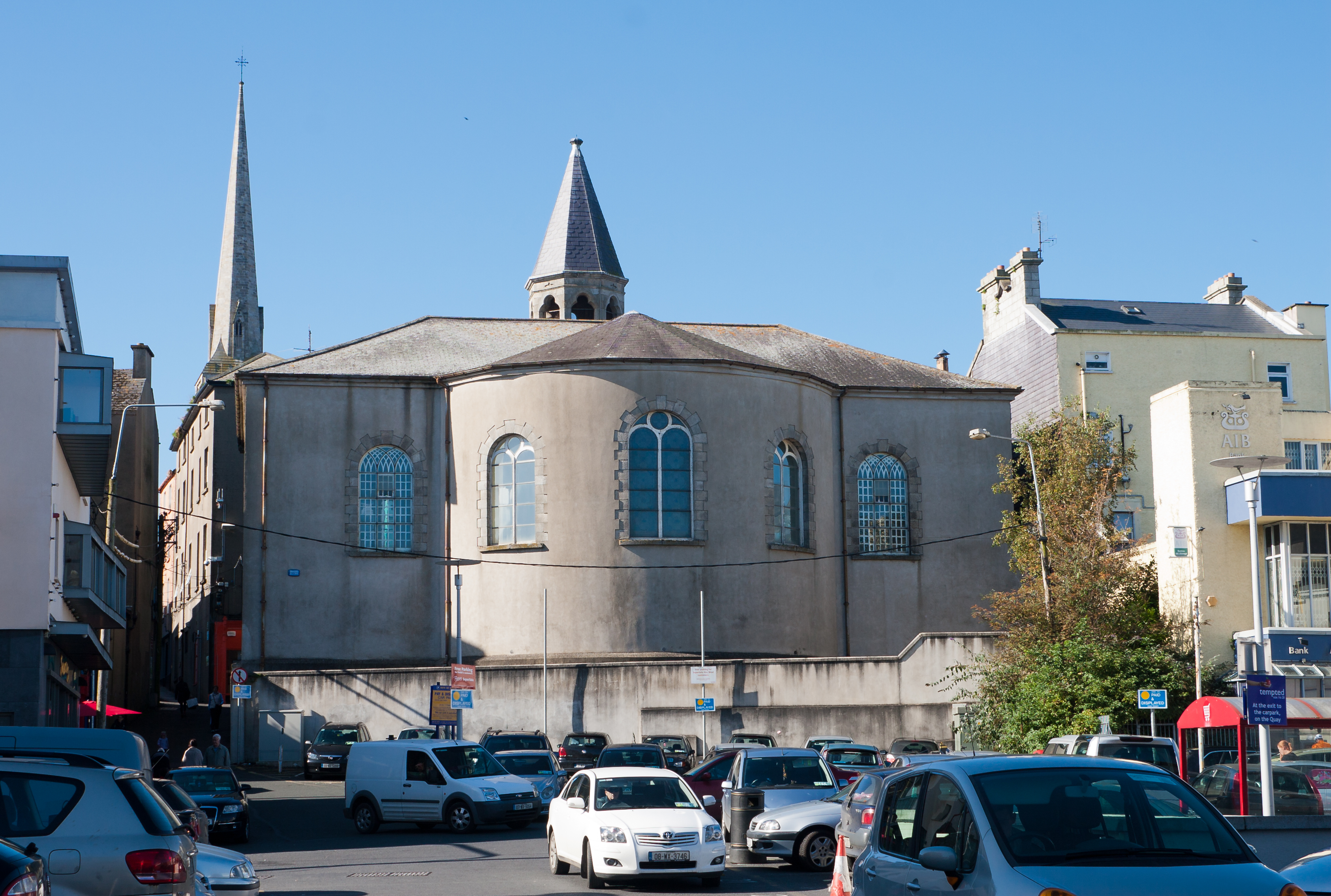
Northeast facade

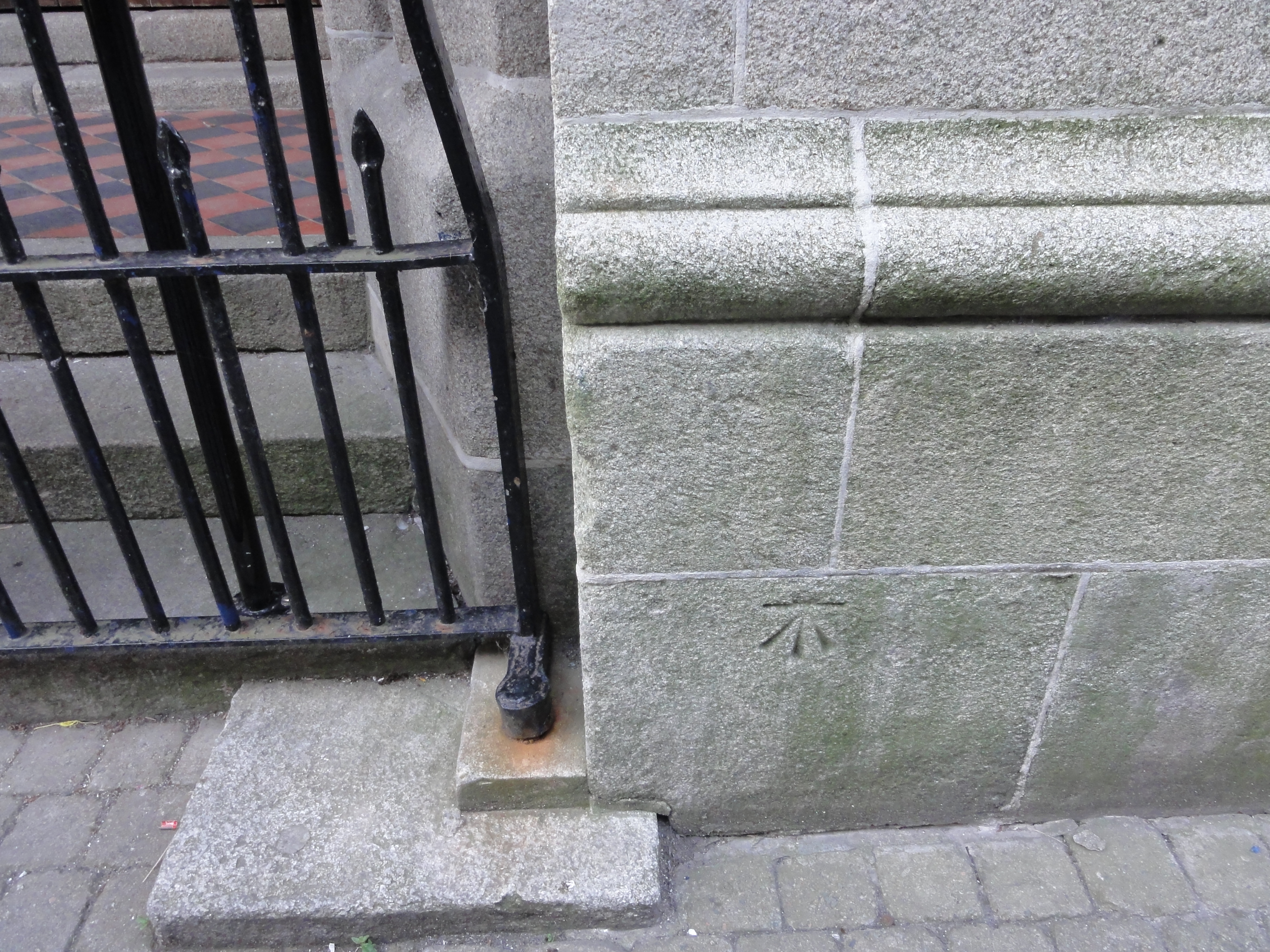
Ordnance Survey Ireland benchmark at the south entrance of St Iberius'

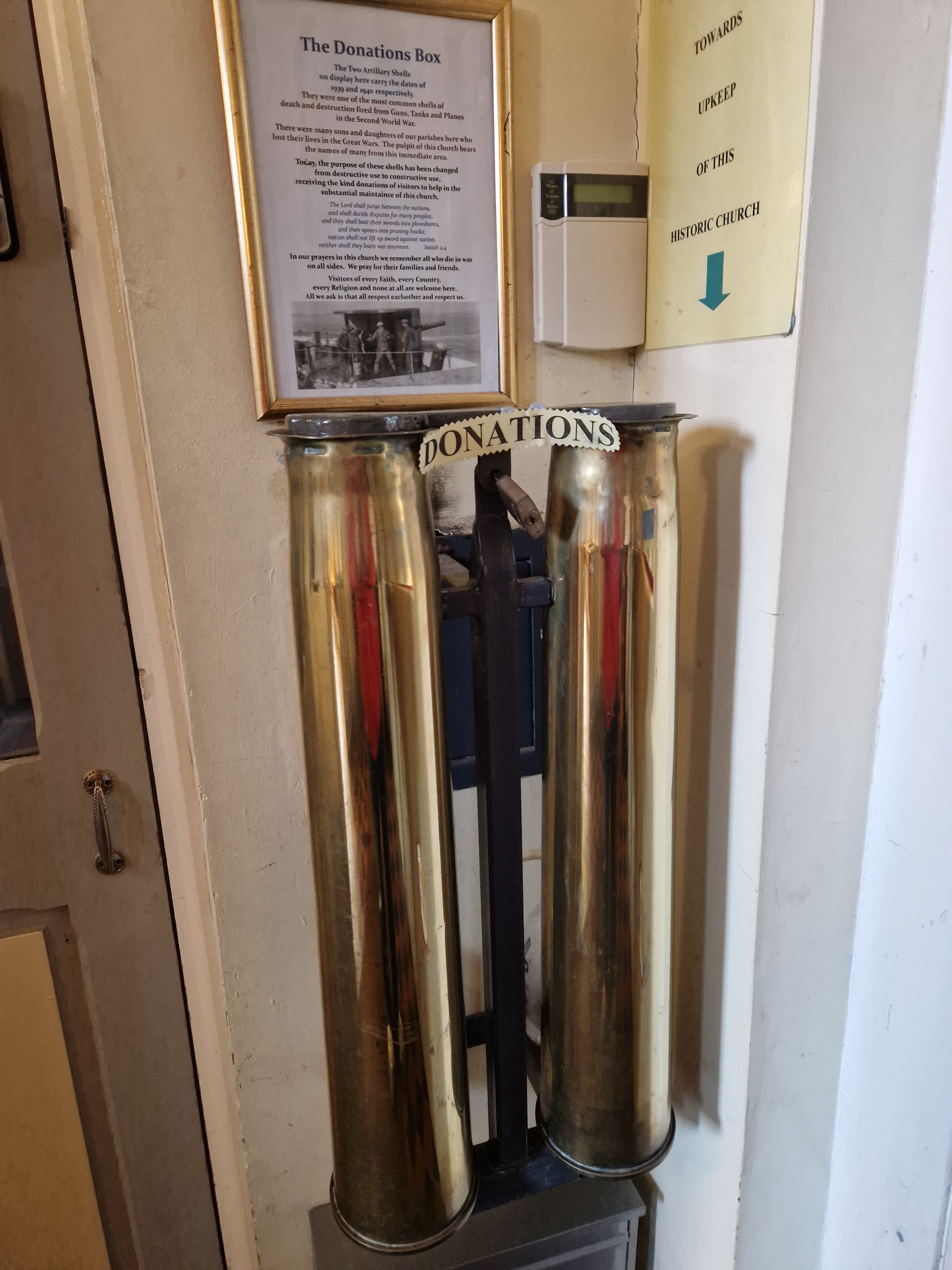
Donation boxes made from Second World War artillery shells.

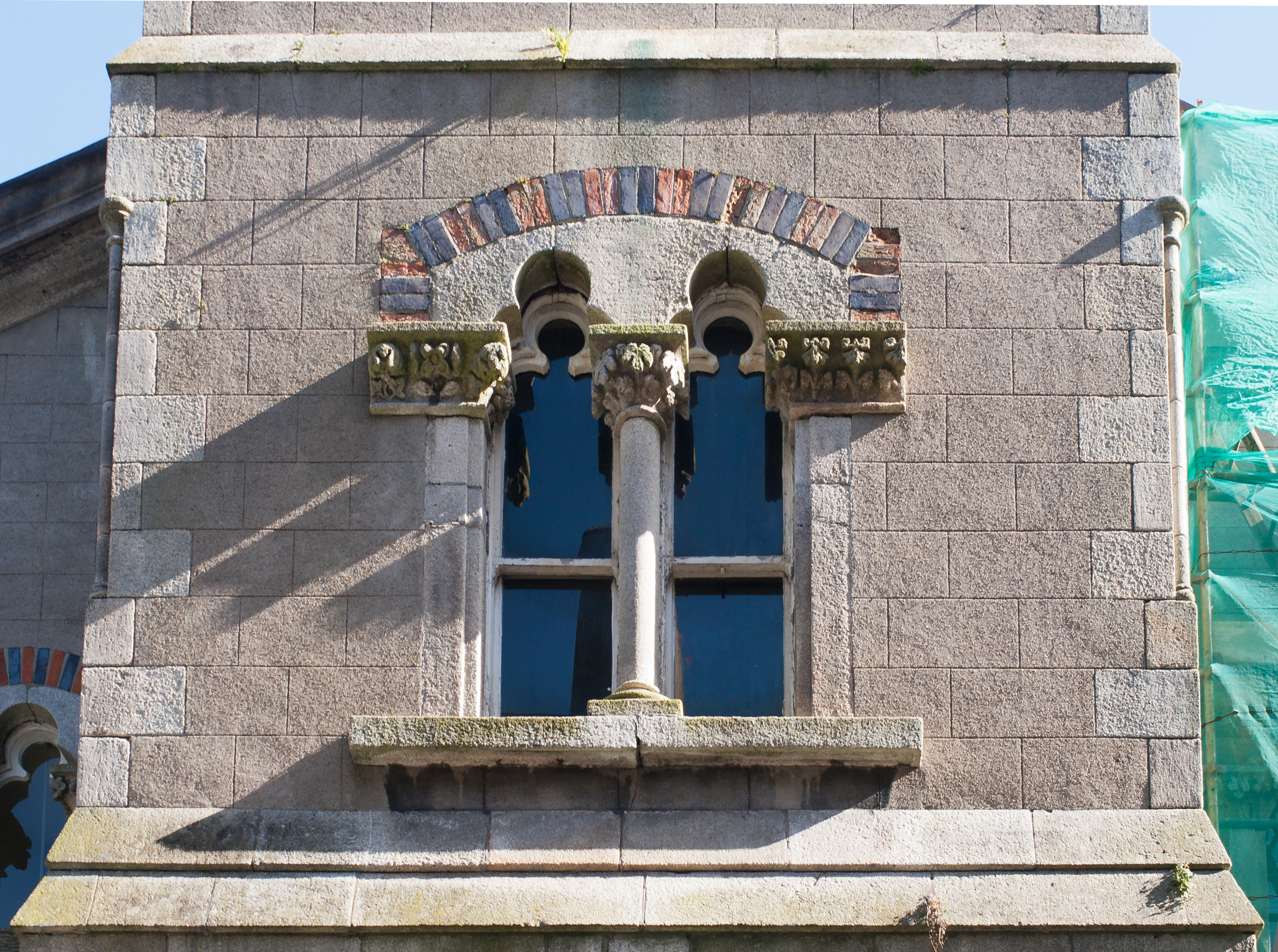
Two-light window in the tower with polychrome brick

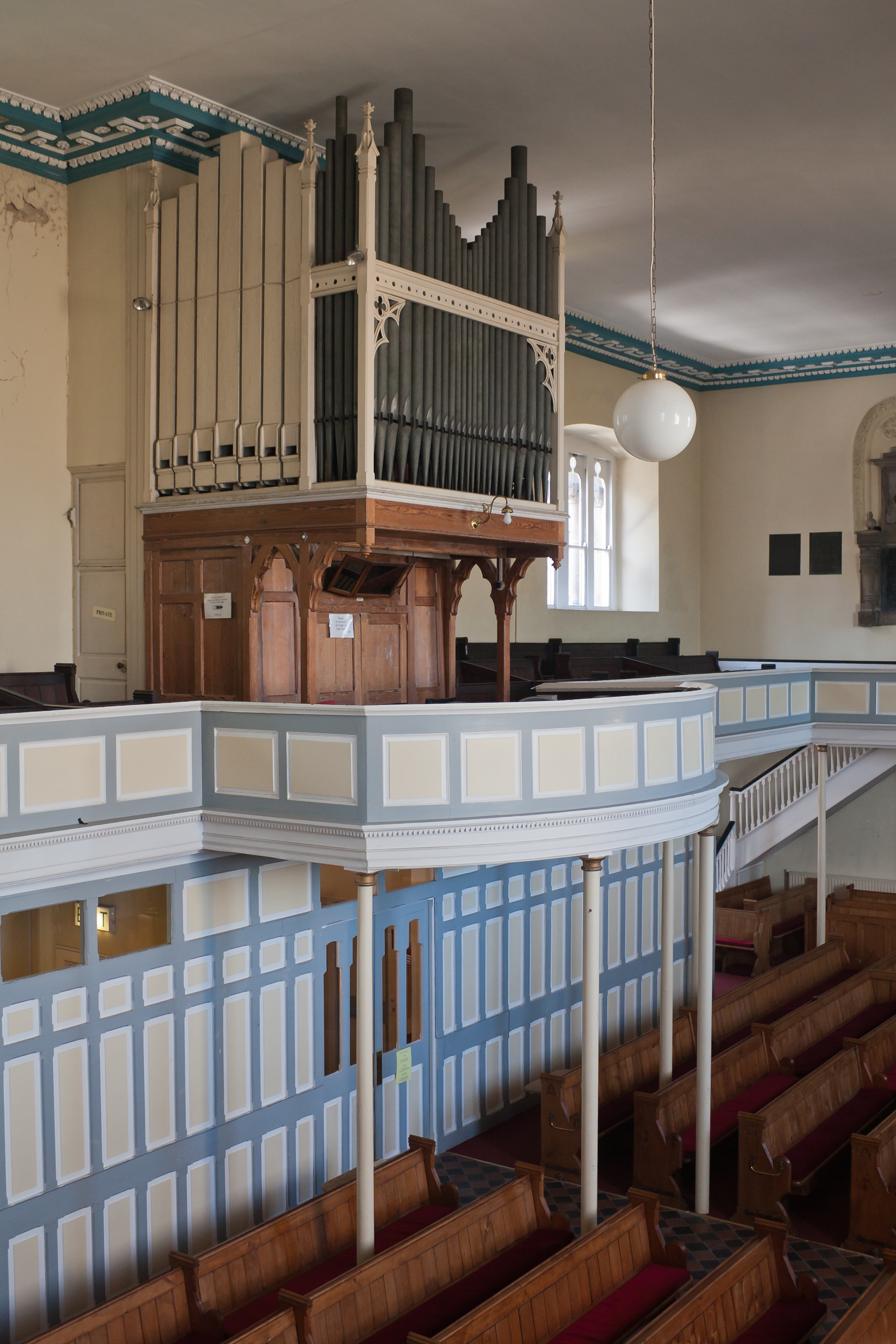
Organ

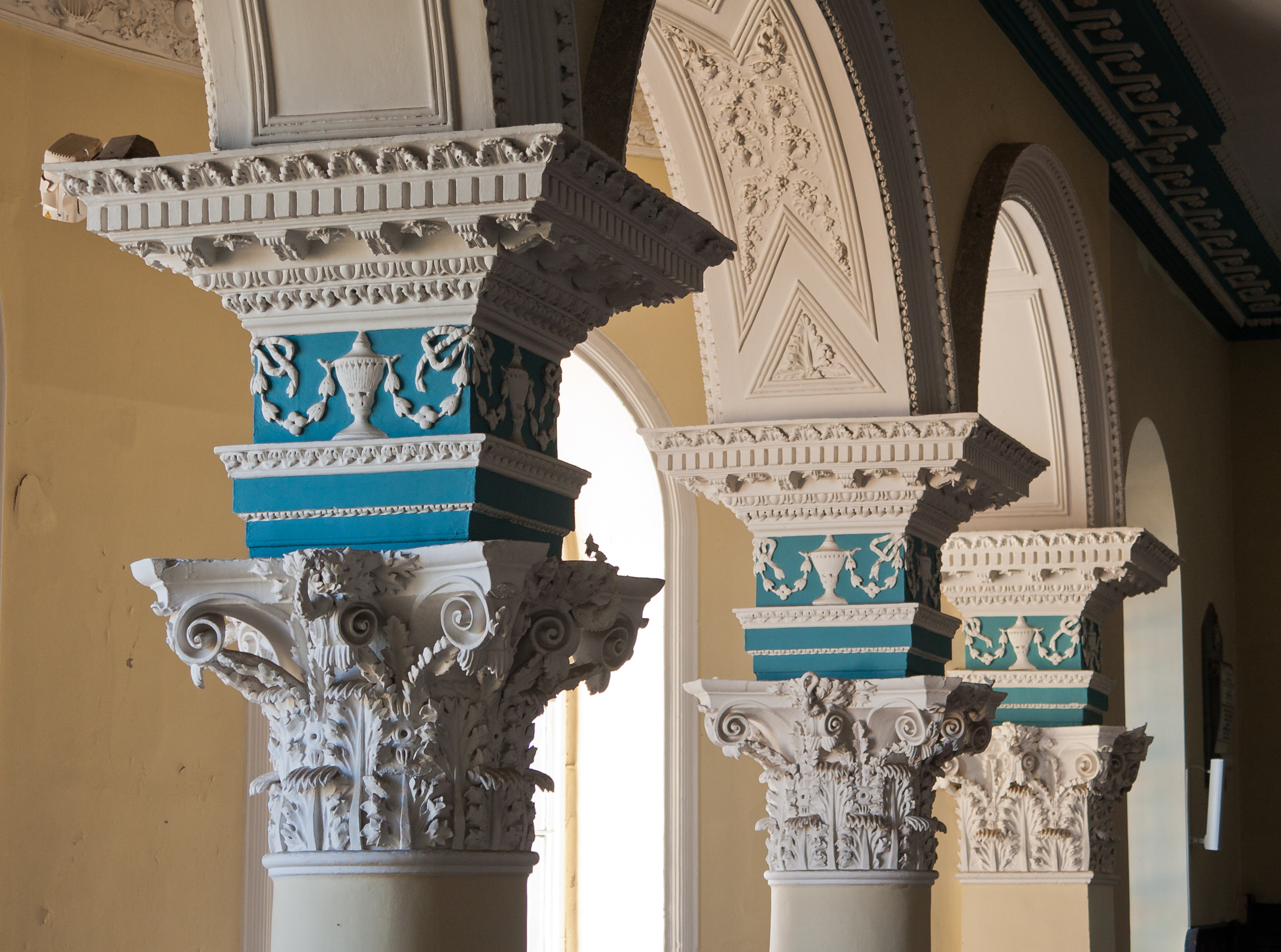
Decorated capitals

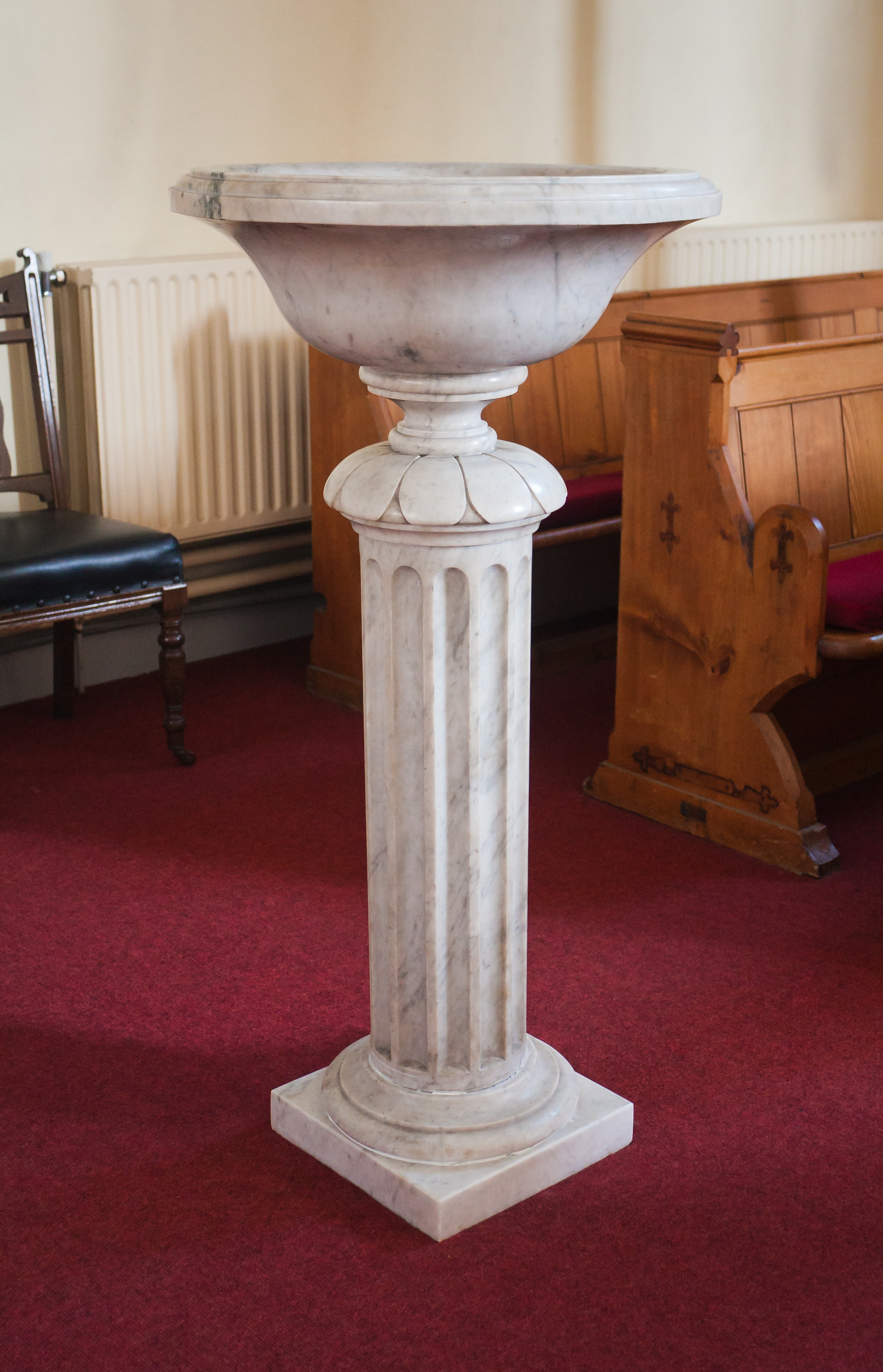
Baptismal font
