= John Elgee =

John Elgee (1754–1824) was an Anglo-Irish clergyman who served as Archdeacon of Leighlin from 1804 until his death. His grandson, Robert McClure, was an Arctic explorer; and his granddaughter, Jane Wilde, was the mother of Oscar Wilde.

He was educated at Trinity College, Dublin. His whole career was spent at St Iberius' Church, Wexford; from 1790 to 1794 as Curate and from 1795 as rector. During the Irish Rebellion of 1798 he was saved from certain death because of his previous humanitarian treatment of the poor.
