= Robert McClure =

Irish admiral and arctic explorer (1807–1873)

Vice-Admiral Sir Robert McClure CB
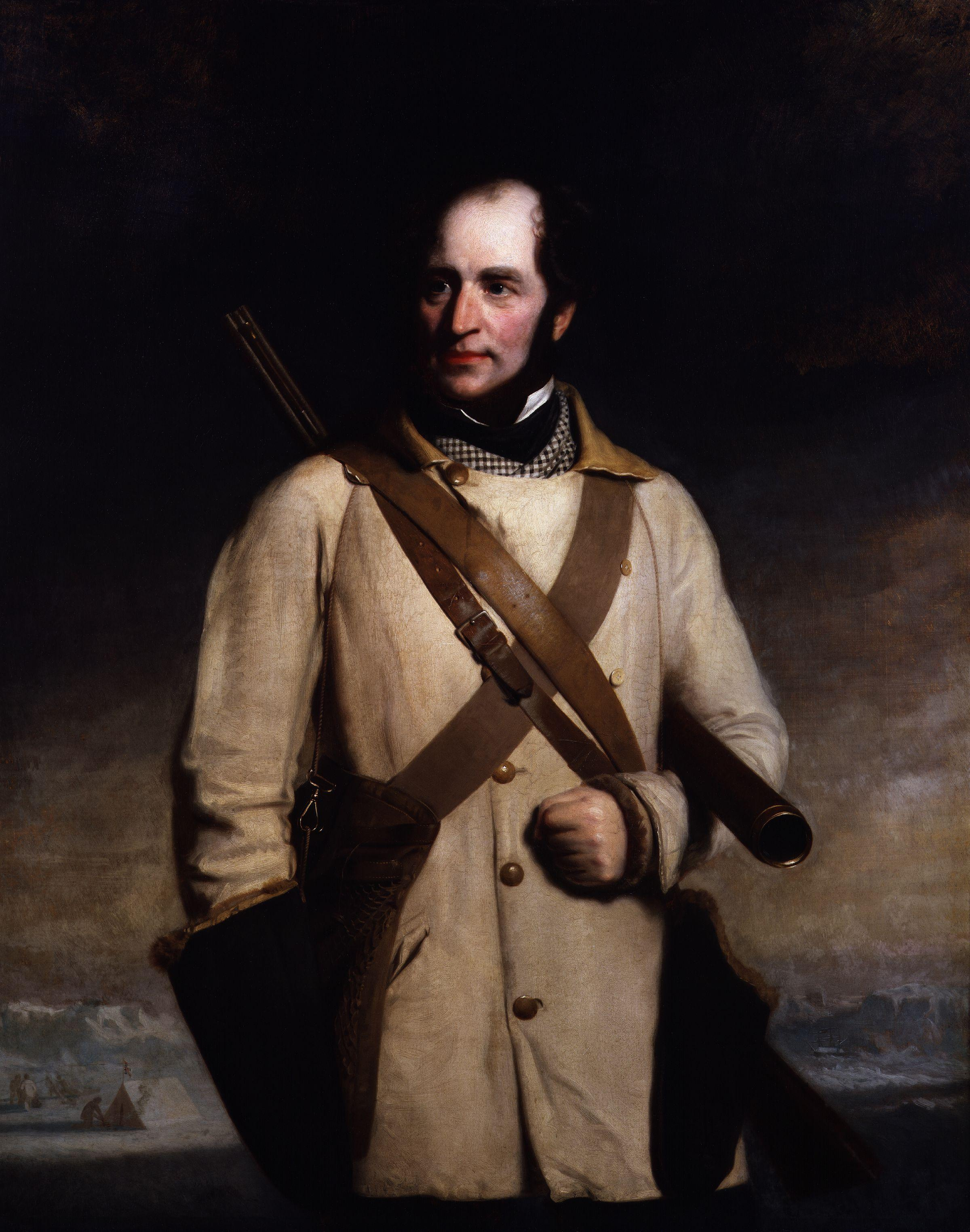
- Robert McClure in a portrait by Stephen Pearce (1858)
- Born: Robert John Le Mesurier McClure; 28 January 1807; Wexford, Ireland
- Died: 17 October 1873 (aged 66); Portsmouth, Hampshire, UK
- Burial place: Kensal Green Cemetery
- Spouse: Constance Tudor (m. 1869)
- Relatives: John Elgee (grandfather)
- Military career
- Branch: Royal Navy
- Service years: 1824–1873
- Academy: Sandhurst Military Academy
- Rank: Vice-Admiral
- Wars: Second Opium War
- Expeditions: McClure Arctic Expedition
- Awards: Royal Geographical Society's Patron's Medal (1854); Grande Médaille d'Or des Explorations (1855); Companion of the Order of the Bath (1859)

Vice-Admiral Sir Robert John Le Mesurier McClure CB (28 January 1807 – 17 October 1873) was an Irish explorer who explored the Arctic. In 1854 he traversed the Northwest Passage by boat and sledge, and was the first to circumnavigate the Americas.

== Early life and career ==
McClure was born in Wexford in the south-east of Ireland. His father was Captain Robert McClure from County Londonderry in Ulster, who was serving with the 89th Foot. McClure's mother (the daughter of Archdeacon John Elgee) and father had met and married while his father was stationed in Wexford in 1807; but, his father had died by the time of McClure's birth. He was a first cousin of Jane Wilde, the mother of Oscar Wilde, and spent his childhood under the care of his godfather, John Le Mesurier, governor of Alderney, by whom he was educated for the army. It is said that this branch of the McClures, who settled in County Londonderry in the 1650s, during the Plantation of Ulster, were actually MacLeods whose names had been altered.

He entered the Royal Navy in 1824, and twelve years later gained his first experience of Arctic exploration as mate of HMS Terror on an expedition commanded by Captain George Back. On his return, he obtained his commission as a lieutenant and from 1838 to 1839 served on the Canadian lakes. Subsequently, he was attached to the North American and West Indian naval stations, where he remained until 1846.

Two years later, in 1848, he joined a search expedition in their attempt to recover Franklin's lost expedition, an ill-fated expedition to traverse the Northwest Passage led by Sir John Franklin that was missing since 1845. McClure served under James Clark Ross as first HMS Enterprise's first lieutenant.

== Northwest Passage ==
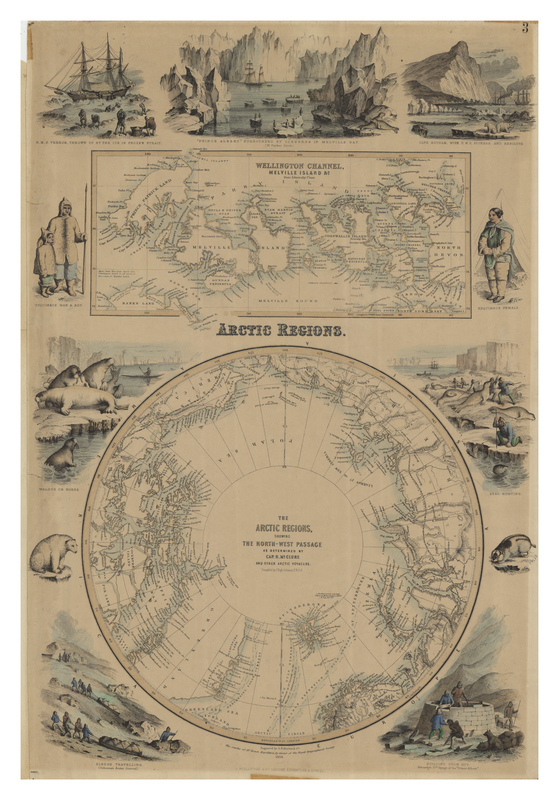
The Arctic Regions, showing the North-West Passage as determined by Cap. R. McClure and other Arctic Voyagers. 1856.

After he returned from the first Franklin search expedition, a new search expedition launched in 1850, commanded by Richard Collinson on HMS Enterprise and McClure as his subordinate, given command of HMS Investigator. The ships sailed south on the Atlantic, navigated through the Strait of Magellan to the Pacific Ocean assisted by the steam-sloop HMS Gorgon. Collinson and McClure became separated and had no further contact for the rest of their respective journeys.

Investigator sailed north through the Pacific and entered the Arctic Ocean by way of Bering Strait, and sailing eastward past Point Barrow, Alaska, to eventually link up with another British expedition from the northwest. Investigator was abandoned to the pack ice in the spring of 1853. McClure and his crew undertook a sledge journey and were rescued when they happened upon a party from HMS Resolute – one of the ships commanded by Sir Edward Belcher, who sailed into the Arctic region from the east. Subsequently, he completed his journey across the Northwest Passage. Resolute itself did not make it out of the Arctic that year; it was abandoned in ice, but later recovered.

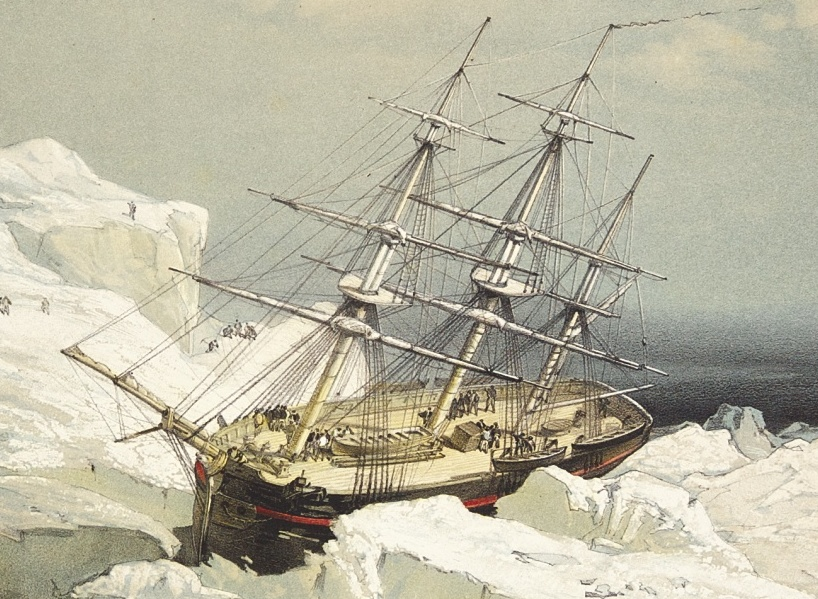
HMS Investigator trapped in ice, as depicted by the ship's artist Samuel Gurney Cresswell.

Thus, McClure and his crew were the first both to circumnavigate the Americas, and to transit the Northwest Passage – considerable feats at that time. Enterprise returned to Point Barrow in 1850, a fortnight later than Investigator, and found the passage blocked by winter ice. They had to turn back and return the following year; it conducted its own Arctic explorations, but credit for the Northwest Passage already belonged to McClure.

On his return to the United Kingdom, in 1854, McClure was court martialled for the loss of Investigator. This was automatic when a captain lost his ship. Following an honourable acquittal, McClure was knighted and promoted to post-rank, his commission being dated back four years in recognition of his special services. McClure and his crew shared a monetary reward of £10,000 by the British Parliament.

McClure was also honoured by both British and French geographical societies. In 1855, he was elected a member of the American Antiquarian Society.

== Later career ==
From 1856 to 1861 he served in eastern waters, commanding a division of the Naval Brigade before Canton in 1858, for which he received the Order of the Bath. His latter years were spent in a quiet country life; he attained the rank of rear-admiral in 1867, and became a vice-admiral in 1873. He died later that year.

McClure is buried at Kensal Green Cemetery, London. His epitaph reads: 'Thus We Launch into this Formidable Frozen Sea. Spes Mea in Deo.' McClure Strait was later named after him, as well as the lunar McClure crater in the Mare Fecunditatis, the Sea of Fertility.

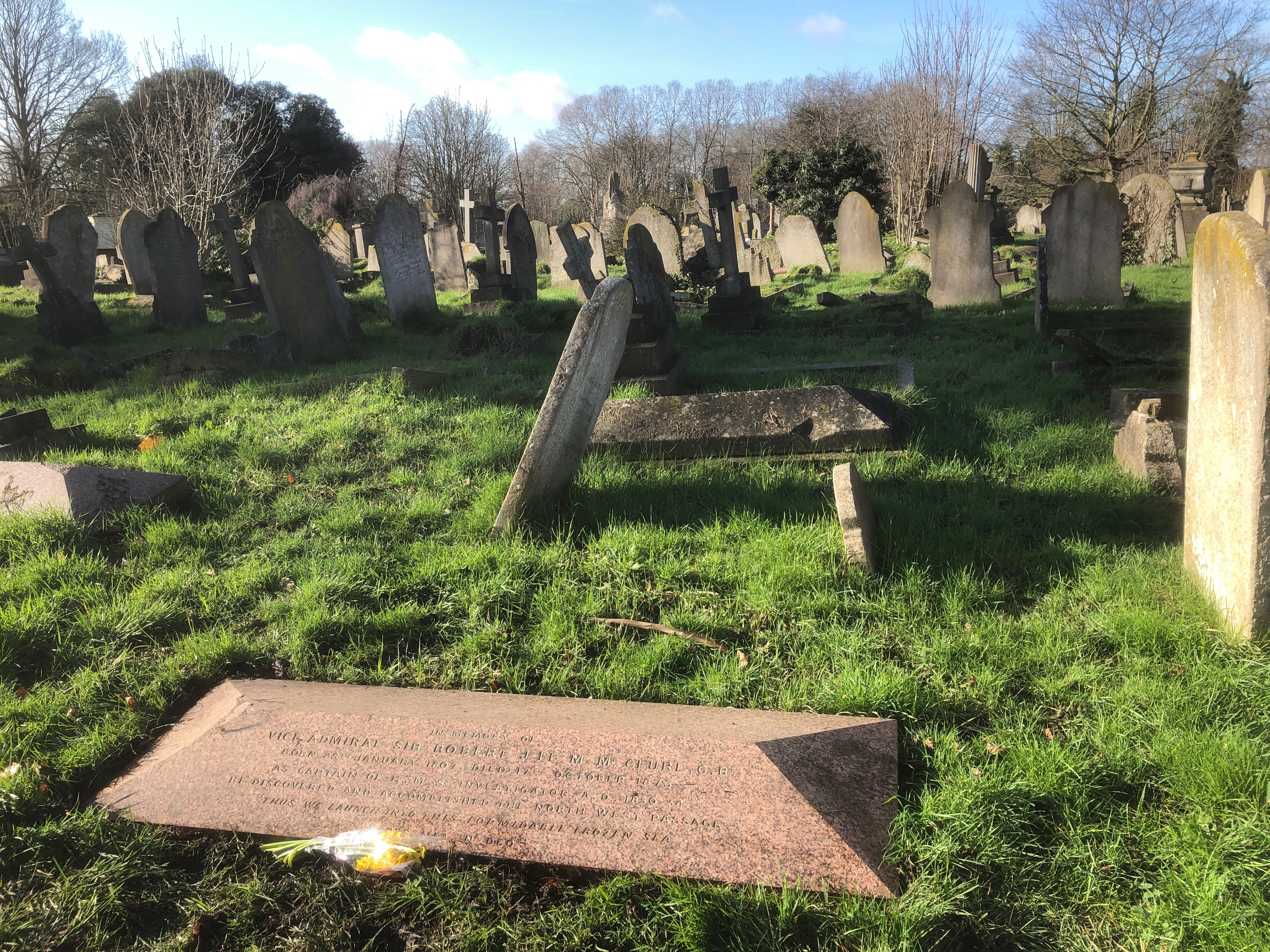
Robert McClure’s grave at Kensal Green Cemetery, London, United Kingdom

== Bibliography ==
- "McClure, Sir Robert". Dictionary of Canadian Biography (online ed.). University of Toronto Press. 1979–2016.
- O'Byrne, William R. (1849). "McClure, Robert John Le Mesurier". A Naval Biographical Dictionary. London: John Murray. p. 691.
- Chisholm, Hugh, ed. (1911). "McClure, Sir Robert John le Mesurier". Encyclopædia Britannica. Vol. 17 (11th ed.). Cambridge University Press. pp. 204–205.
