= Jane Wilde =

Irish poet (1821-1896)

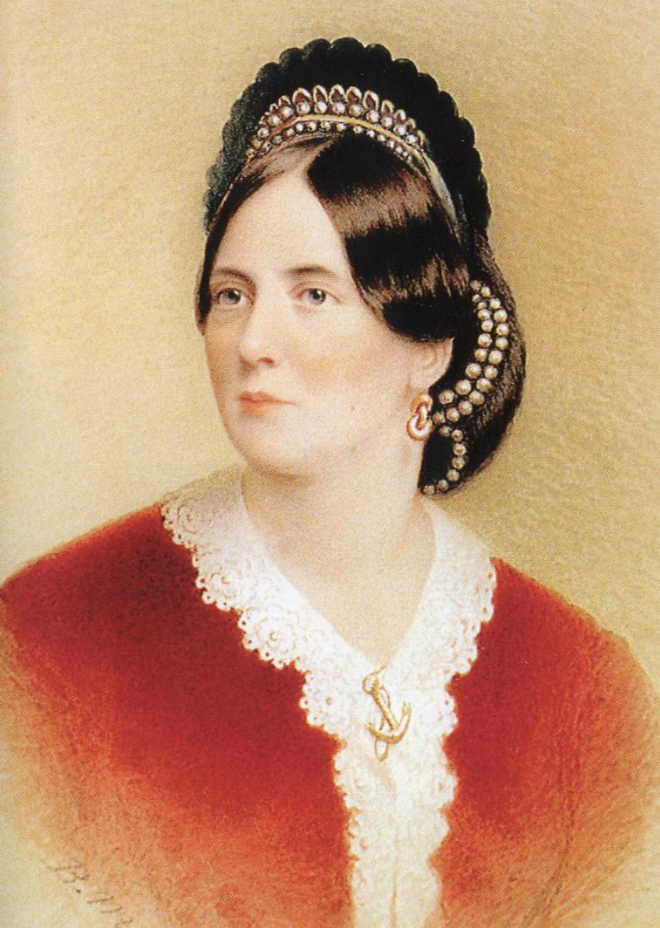
- Portrait of Jane Wilde, 1864
- Born: Jane Francesca Agnes Elgee; 27 December 1821; Wexford, Ireland
- Died: 3 February 1896 (aged 74); Chelsea, London, England
- Occupation: Poet
- Spouse: Sir William Wilde (m. 1851; died 1876)
- Children: Oscar Wilde; Willie Wilde; Isola Wilde
- Relatives: John Elgee (grandfather); Robert McClure (cousin); Basil Maturin (first cousin, once removed)
- Writing career
- Pen name: Speranza
- Language: English
- Notable works: Ancient Legends Mystic Charms & Superstitions of Ireland

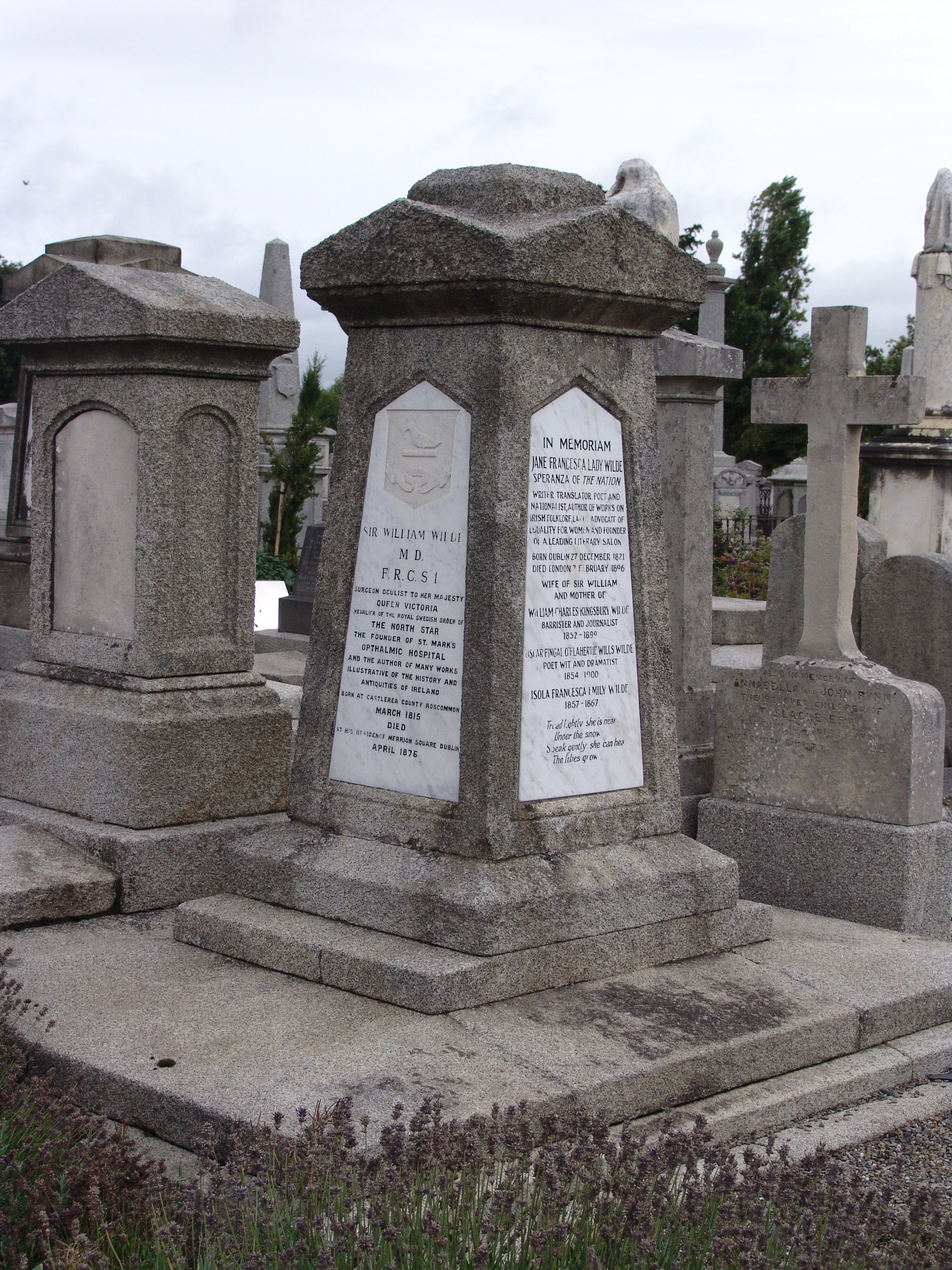
Memorial to Lady Wilde and her husband located in Mount Jerome Cemetery, Dublin

Jane Francesca Agnes Wilde, Lady Wilde (née Elgee. 27 December 1821 – 3 February 1896) was an Irish poet who wrote under the pen name Speranza and supporter of the nationalist movement. Lady Wilde had a special interest in Irish folktales, which she helped to gather and was the mother of Oscar Wilde and Willie Wilde.

== Life ==
=== Early life ===
Jane Francesca Agnes Elgee was the last of the four children of Charles Elgee (1783–1824), the son of Archdeacon John Elgee, a Wexford solicitor, and his wife Sarah (née Kingsbury, d. 1851). Her mother came from a prosperous Protestant family in Dublin and was considered a great beauty. Jane was the youngest of four children of the couple, her older siblings being Emily, John, and Frances (who died as an infant)

She claimed that her great-grandfather was an Italian surnamed Algiati which was said to be a derived from Alighieri thus implying a relationship with the famous poet. This ancestor was said to have come to Wexford in the 18th century; in fact, the Elgees descended from Durham labourers who had gained prosperity as builders and bricklayers and then in succeeding generations, became part of the gentry.

Her maternal aunt Emily was married to the author Charles Maturin, though his death two years before her own birth precluded her ever meeting him, but whose bust Jane would display in her home as an adult. Another aunt, Elizabeth, was married to the politician Sir Charles Montagu Ormsby while her paternal aunt and namesake Jane Elgee was the mother of the arctic explorer Robert McClure who discovered the Northwestern passage.

Jane's father died at Bangalore, India when she was just three years old, leaving her mother to raise her and her siblings. The family moved to Wexford, where they lived in modest circumstances.

==== Youth ====
As a young woman, Jane was considered a beauty with dark eyes, jet-black hair and tall in stature. Her education was undertaken by a succession of governesses and tutors. She is said to have mastered ten languages by the age of 18 under the instruction of Richard Waddy Elgee, her paternal uncle.

Jane's brother John emigrated to the United States when she was just nine years old. He became a lawyer and a judge in Louisiana. Jane, her mother, and older sister Emily, moved back to Dublin to live at Lower Leeson Street No. 34.

Her older sister, Emily, would go on to marry an officer and, after his appointment as Deputy Quartermaster General of Jamaica, would live most of her married life abroad in the West Indies. Jane's brother-in-law, being an English officer, caused a strain between the sisters on account of Jane's nationalism. The sisters remained distant even after Emily's return to Britain.

Jane and her mother continued to live on Leeson Street. In 1849, Elgee translated the Gothic tale Sidonia the Sorceress (1847) by Willhelm Meinhold from German into English.

Jane met William Wilde, either as a patient or through literary circles, near the end of the 1840s. Jane reviewed Wilde's book, The Beauties of the Boyne, and Its Tributary, the Blackwater (1849)

== Marriage ==
On 12 November 1851 she married Sir William Wilde, an eye and ear surgeon (and also a researcher of folklore), in St. Peter's church in Dublin, and they would go on to have three children: William Charles Kingsbury Wilde (26 September 1852 – 13 March 1899), Oscar Fingal O'Flahertie Wills Wilde (16 October 1854 – 30 November 1900), and Isola Francesca Emily Wilde (2 April 1857 – 23 February 1867). Her eldest son, William Wilde, became a journalist and poet; her younger son, Oscar Wilde, became a prolific and famous writer, and her daughter Isola Wilde died in childhood of a fever. Jane was the grandmother of Oscar's sons Cyril and Vyvyan Holland, and of Willie's daughter Dorothy Wilde.

Before their marriage, Wilde had also fathered three illegitimate children, Henry Wilson, Emily and Jane. The son, who was raised by an uncle of Wilde, later became an assistant to his father, and the Wilde children considered him a cousin. There are indications that Wilde was unfaithful to his wife throughout their marriage.

The family first made their home at Westland Row before moving to No 1, Merrion Square in 1855. Merrion Square was a fashionable area of Dublin. After the birth of her daughter Isola, Jane made the acquaintance of the Swedish noblewoman Charlotte "Lotten" von Krämer who was one of her husbands patients. The two women discovered that they shared an interest in literature, culture and women's rights.

This also inspired her to try and learn Swedish to be able to read the Swedish journals von Krämer sent her, though she never mastered it fully. In 1859, when her oldest son William was six years old, he was given a governess, which enabled Jane and her husband to travel abroad. They toured Scandinavia and visited Stockholm, which Jane stated that she would "never enjoy any place again so much". She would later compile her journals detailing her experiences into a travel book titled Driftwood from Scandinavia (1884), which gained moderate success.

== Widowhood ==
When her husband died in 1876, the family discovered that he was virtually bankrupt. Jane Wilde - now Lady Wilde, following the knighting of her husband in 1864 - joined her sons in London in 1879. She lived with her older son in poverty, supplementing their meagre income by writing for fashionable magazines and producing books based on the research of her late husband into Irish folklore. She wrote several books, including 'Ancient legends, mystic charms, and superstitions of Ireland' (1887). Her poems are said to have influenced her son Oscar's own work. For example, his 'Ballad of Reading Gaol' has been compared to her poem 'The Brothers' (based on a true story of a trial and execution in the 1798 Rebellion).

In January 1896, Lady Wilde contracted bronchitis and, dying, asked for permission to see Oscar, who was imprisoned in Reading Gaol. Her request was refused. It was claimed that her "fetch" (i.e. her apparition) appeared in Oscar's prison cell as she died at her home, 146 Oakley Street, Chelsea, on 3 February 1896. Her funeral was held on 5 February at Kensal Green Cemetery in London. It was paid for by Oscar, as her older son, Willie Wilde, was penniless. She was buried anonymously in common ground without a headstone. In 1996, she was memorialised in the form of a plaque on the grave of Sir William Wilde in Dublin as 'Speranza of The Nation, writer, translator, poet and nationalist, author of works on Irish folklore, early advocate of equality for women, and founder of a leading literary salon'. In 1999, a monument to her, in the form of a Celtic cross, was erected at Kensal Green Cemetery by the Oscar Wilde Society. (It is located at grid square 147 – Cambridge Avenue South (near Canalside), set back 20 metres from the curved path – opposite SQ.148.)

== Activist ==
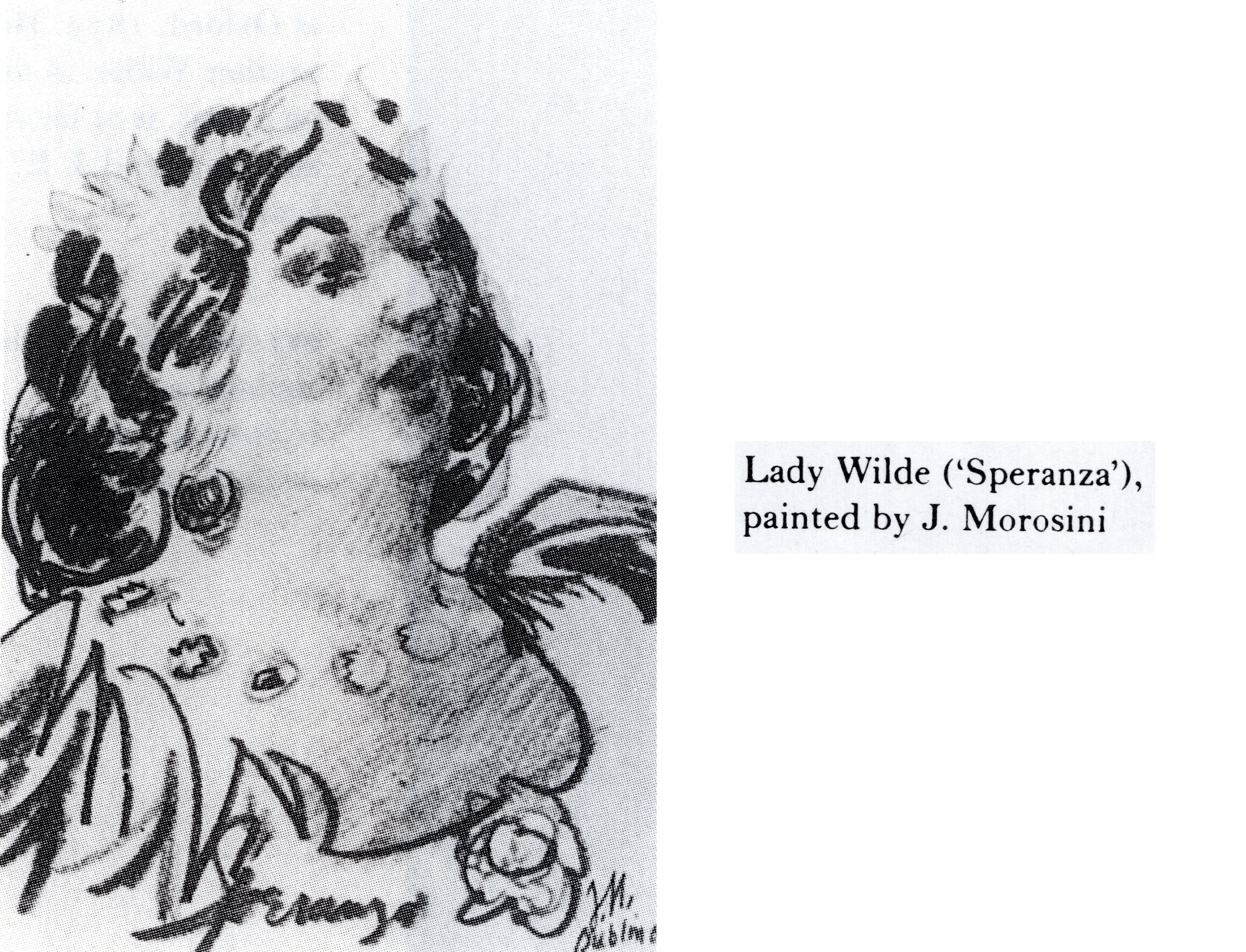
Lady Jane Wilde by J. Morosini

Lady Wilde was the niece of Charles Maturin and wrote for the Young Ireland movement of the 1840s, publishing poems in The Nation under the pseudonym of Speranza. Her works included pro-Irish independence and anti-British writing; she was sometimes known as "Speranza of the Nation". Charles Gavan Duffy was the editor when "Speranza" wrote commentary calling for armed revolution in Ireland. The authorities at Dublin Castle shut down the paper and brought Charles Duffy to court but he refused to name the person who had written the offending article. "Speranza" reputedly stood up in court and claimed responsibility for the article. While the confession was ignored by the authorities, they permanently shut the newspaper down.

Jane was an early advocate of women's rights, and campaigned for better education for women. She invited the suffragist Millicent Fawcett to her home to speak on female liberty. She praised the passing of the Married Women's Property Act 1882, which prevented a woman from having to enter marriage 'as a bond slave, disenfranchised of all rights over her fortune'.

Through her friendship with Charlotte von Krämer, she would also make the acquaintance of the Swedish feminist activist and writer Rosalie Olivecrona.

== Scandals ==
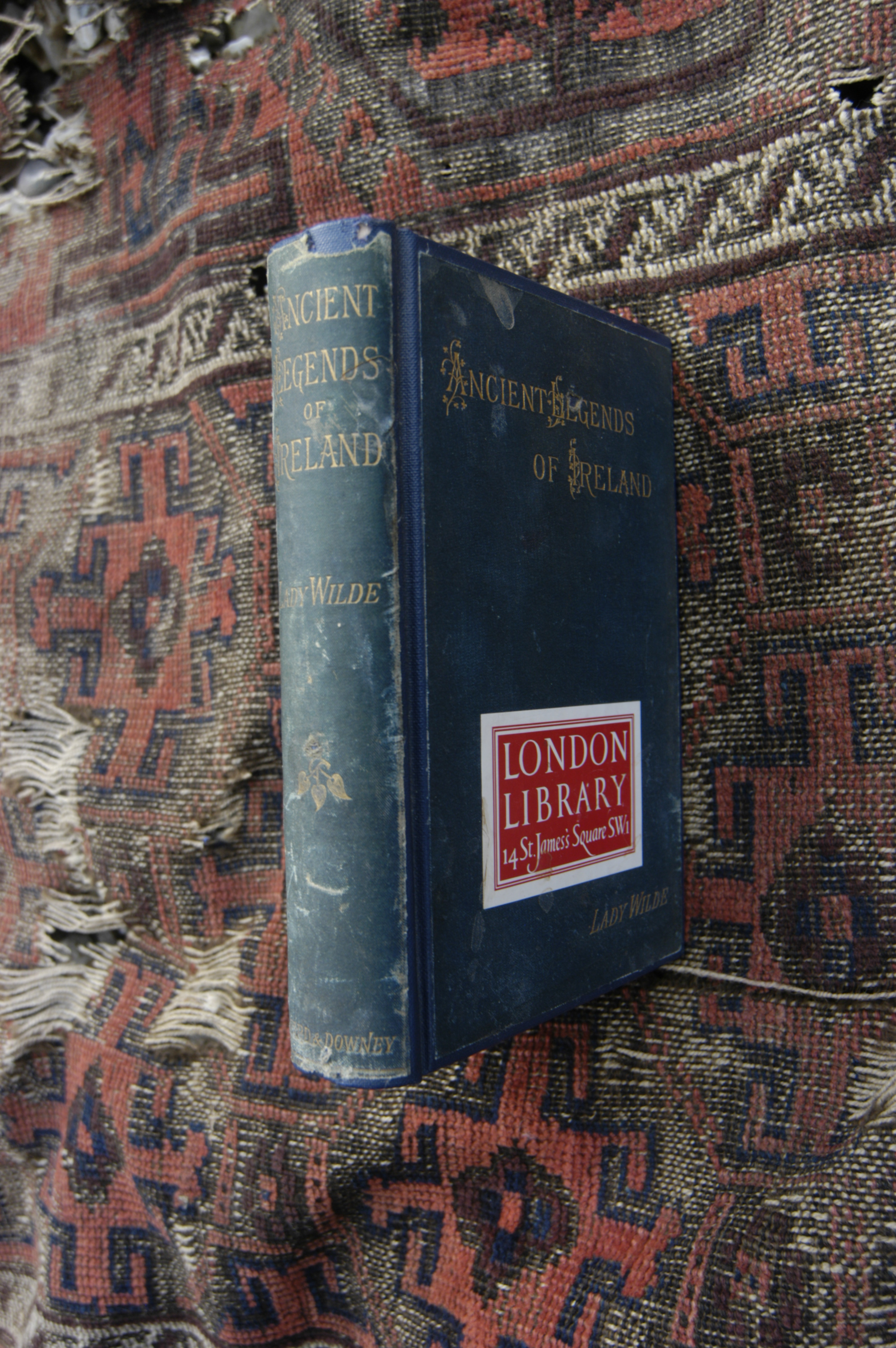
London Library's copy of Ancient Legends of Ireland.

In 1864, Sir William and Lady Wilde were at the centre of a sensational Dublin court case regarding a young woman called Mary Travers, the daughter of a colleague of Sir William's and a long-time patient. Travers claimed that Sir William had drugged her with chloroform and raped her in 1862; when Lady Wilde wrote a letter to Travers's father contesting the allegations, Mary sued her for libel. Mary Travers won the case, although she was only awarded a farthing for damages plus costs. The costs, however, amounted to £2,000.

== Works ==
- Poems by Speranza (1864)
- Poems (1871)
- Memoir Of Gabriel Beranger (1880) Co-authored with husband
- Driftwood From Scandinavia (1884)
- Wilde, Jane (1888). Ancient Legends, Mystic Charms and Superstitions of Ireland. Jazzybee Verlag. ISBN 9783849673604.
- Notes On Men, Women, And Books (1891)

== Biographies ==
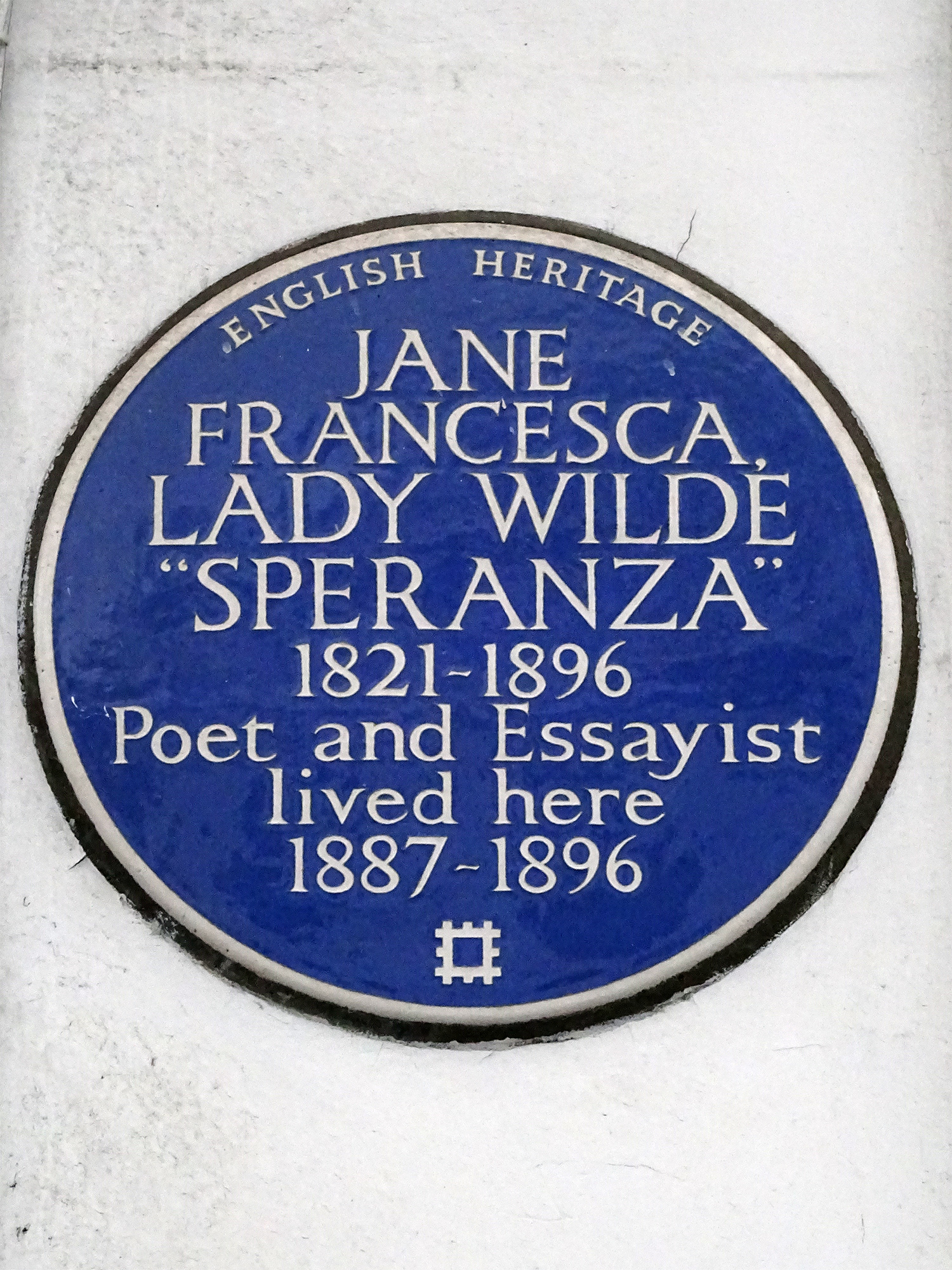
Blue Plaque at home of Lady Jane Wilde in Chelsea

- In 1911 the American-born writer Anna de Brémont, who claimed to have had a close friendship with Lady Wilde, published a memoir entitled Oscar Wilde and His Mother.
- Mother of Oscar: The Life of Jane Francesca Wilde, Joy Melville, John Murray (1994)
- Wilde's Women: How Oscar Wilde Was Shaped by the Women He Knew, Eleanor Fitzsimons, Gerald Duckworth & Co Ltd (16 Oct 2015)
- A Critical Biography of Lady Jane Wilde, 1821?-1896, Irish Revolutionist, Humanist, Scholar and Poet, Karen Sasha Anthony Tipper, Edwin Mellen Press (2002)
