= Wexford =

Town in County Wexford, Ireland

Wexford Loch Garman (Irish)
- Town
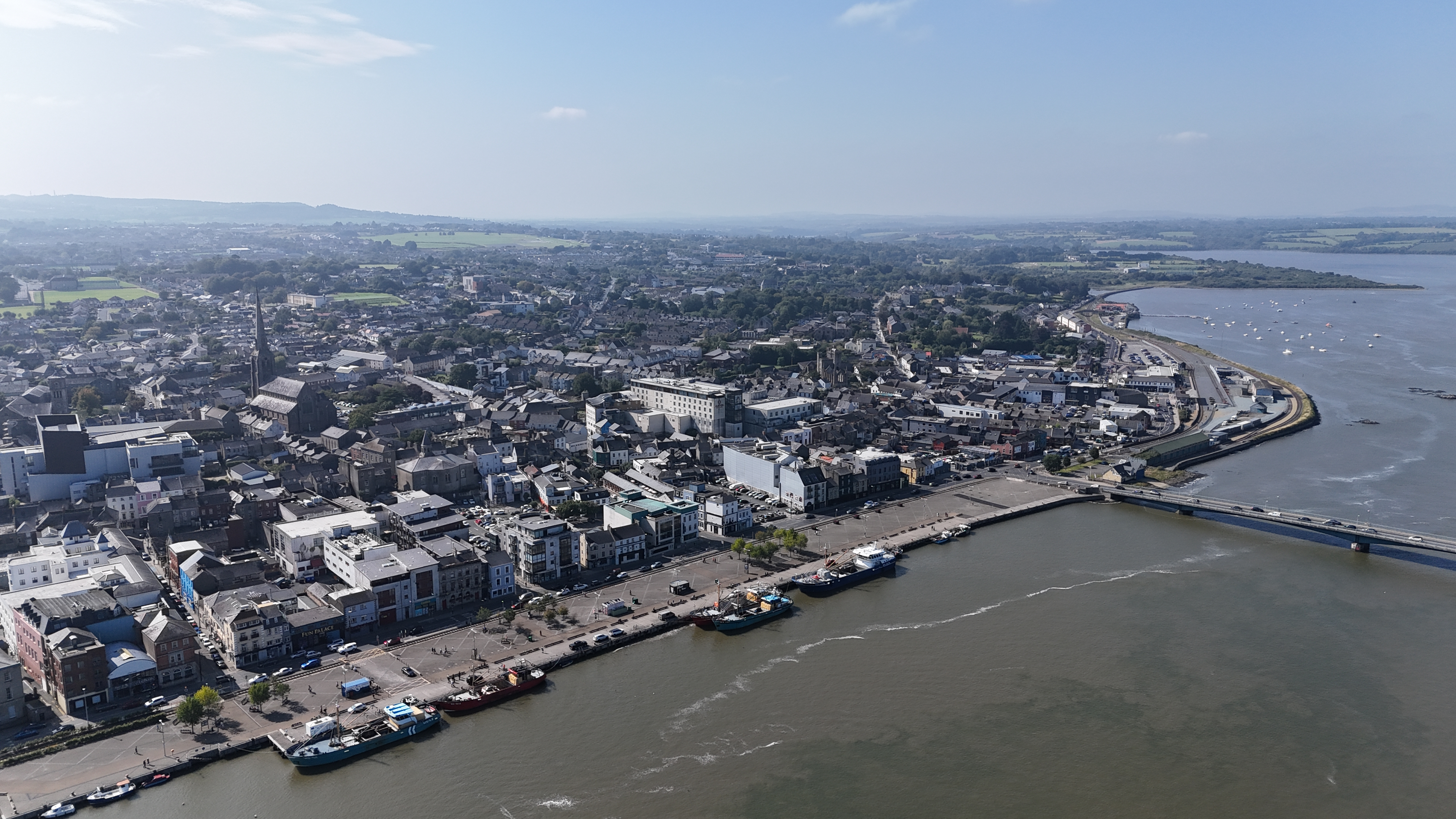
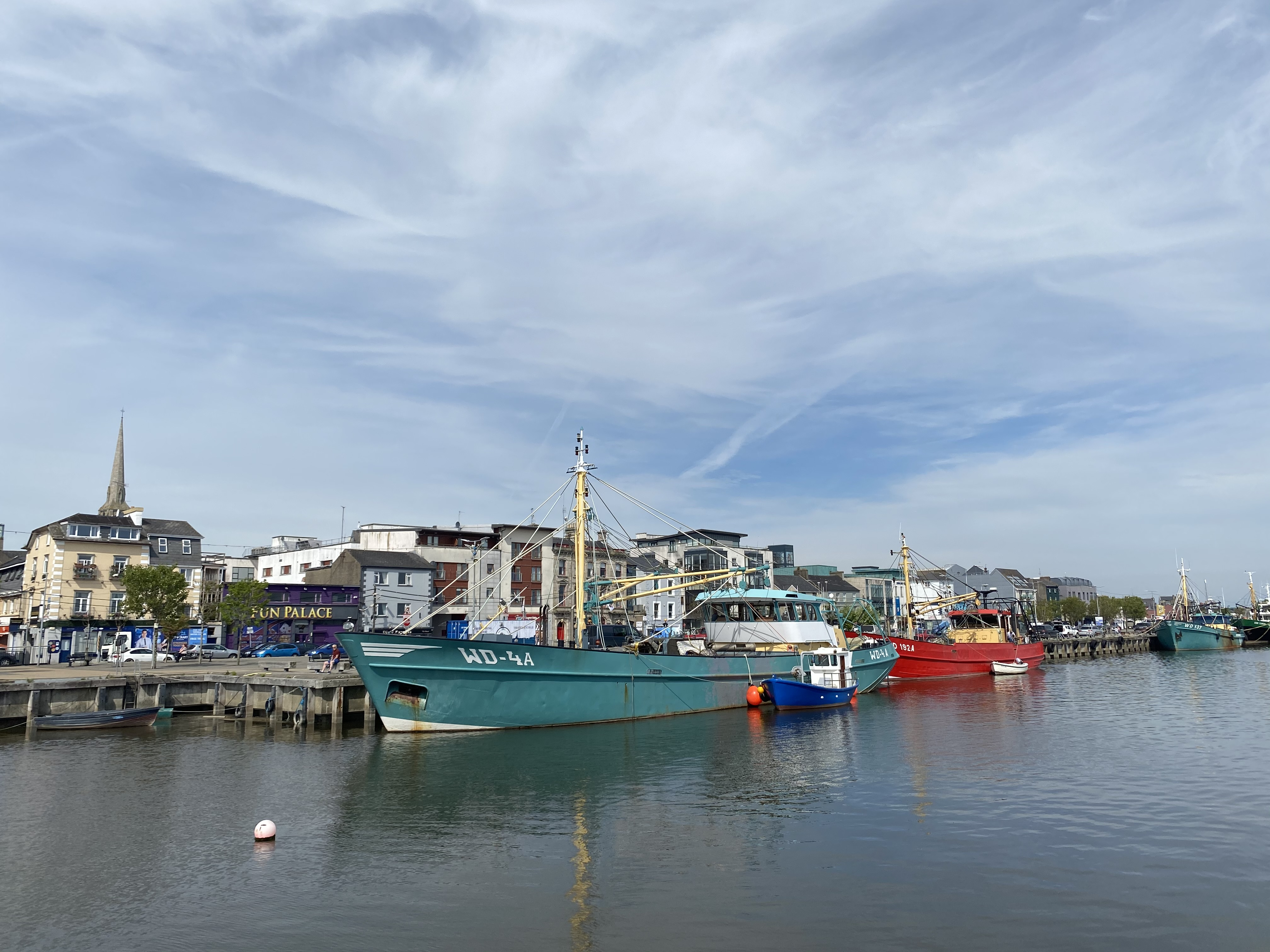
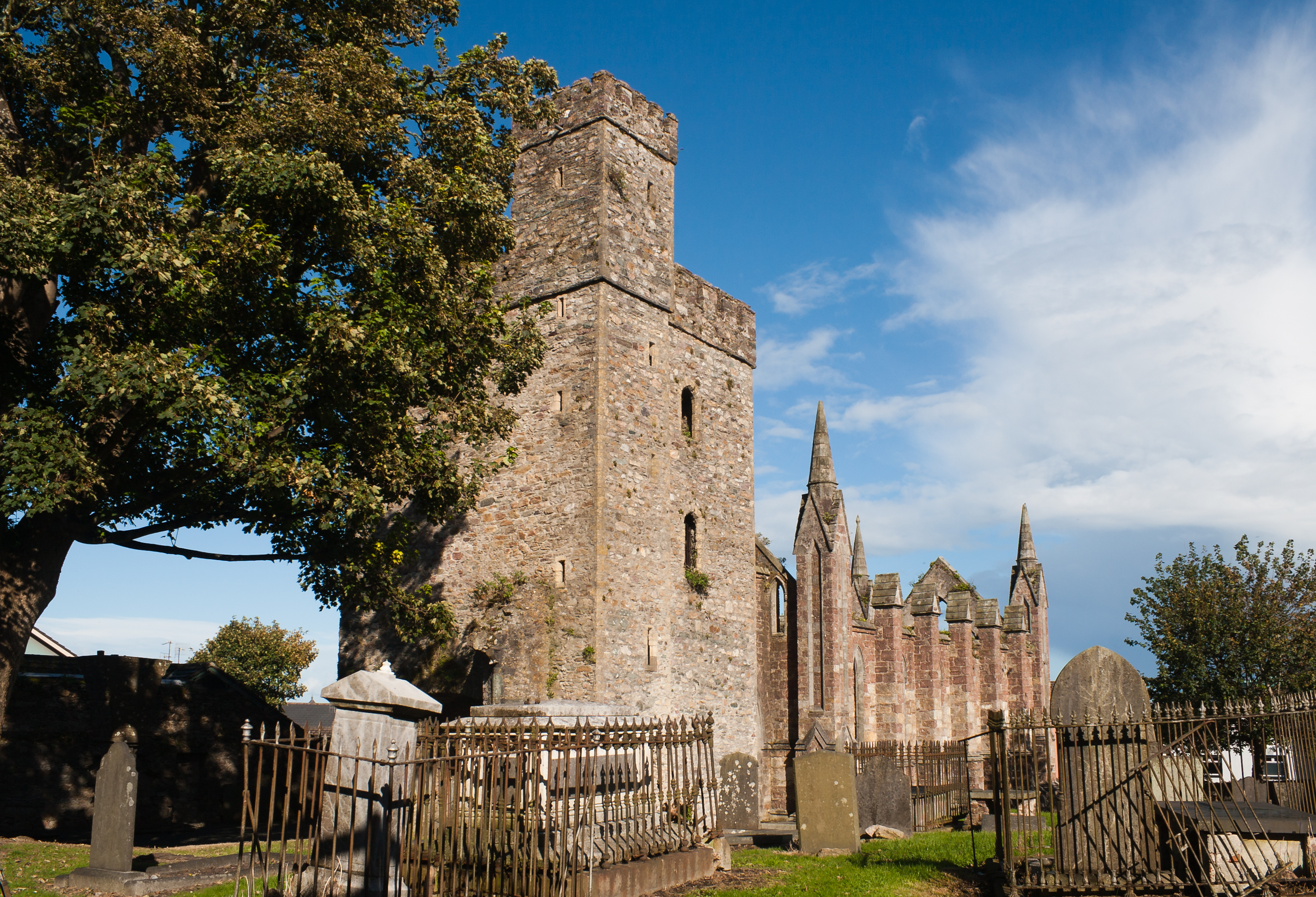
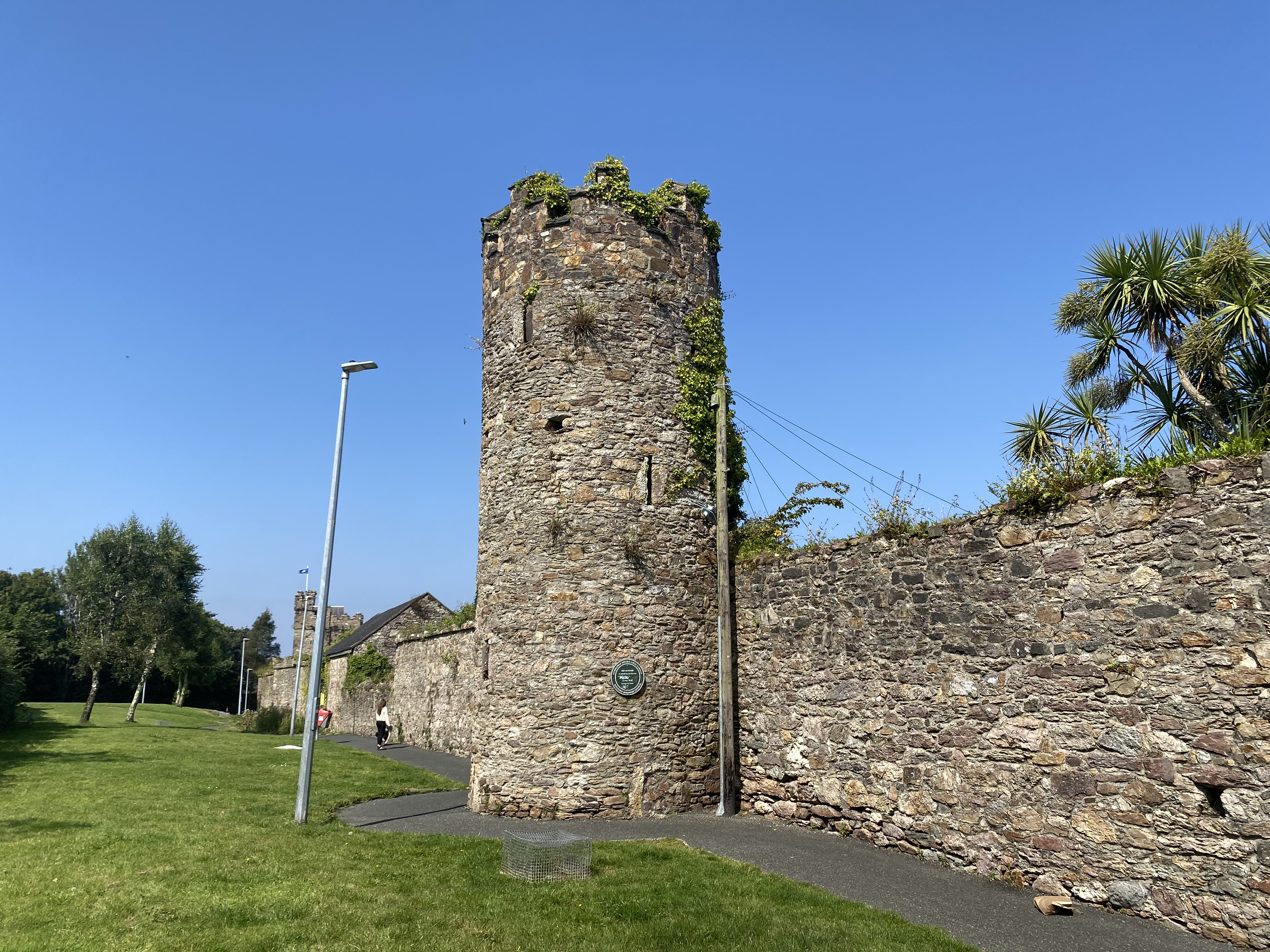
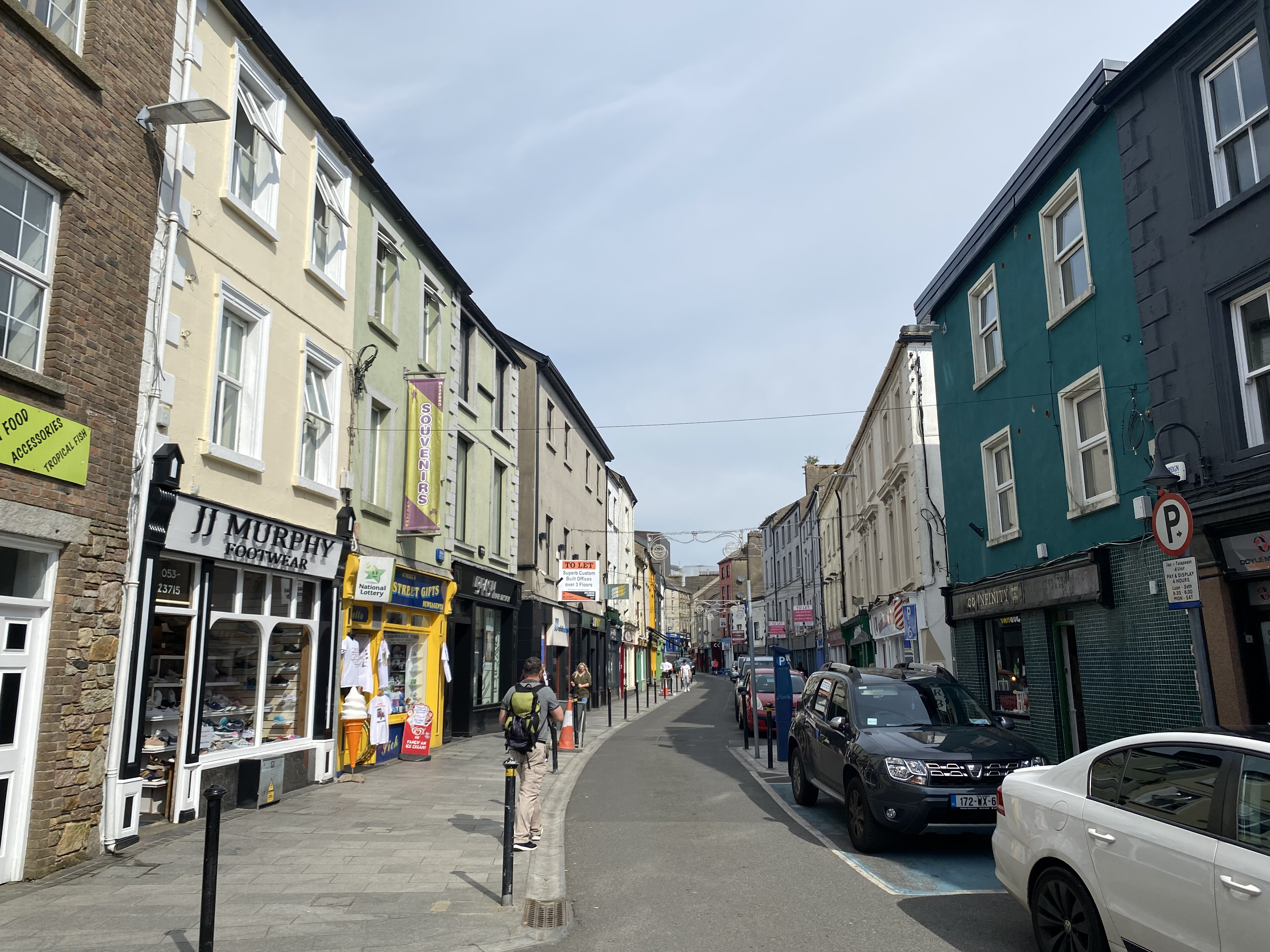
- Town skyline Wexford Quays Selskar Abbey Town wall South Main Street

- Coat of arms
- Motto: Per Aquam et Ignem "Through Water and Fire"
- Location within Ireland Location within Europe
- Coordinates: 52°20′18″N 6°27′42″W
- Country: Ireland
- Province: Leinster
- County: County Wexford

Government
  - Dáil constituency: Wexford
  - EP constituency: South
- Elevation: 1 m (3.3 ft)

Population (2022)
  - Total: 21,524
- Time zone: UTC±0 (WET)
  - Summer (DST): UTC+1 (IST)
- Eircode routing key: Y35
- Telephone area code: +353(0)53
- Irish Grid Reference: T051213

Wexford (Irish: Loch Garman [ˌl̪ˠɔx ˈɡaɾˠəmˠən̪ˠ]; archaic Yola: Weiseforthe) is the county town of County Wexford, Ireland. Wexford lies on the south side of Wexford Harbour, the estuary of the River Slaney near the southeastern corner of the island of Ireland. The town is linked to Dublin by the M11/N11 National Primary Route; and to Rosslare Europort, Cork and Waterford by the N25. The national rail network connects it to Dublin and Rosslare Europort. It had a population of 21,524 according to the 2022 census.

== History ==
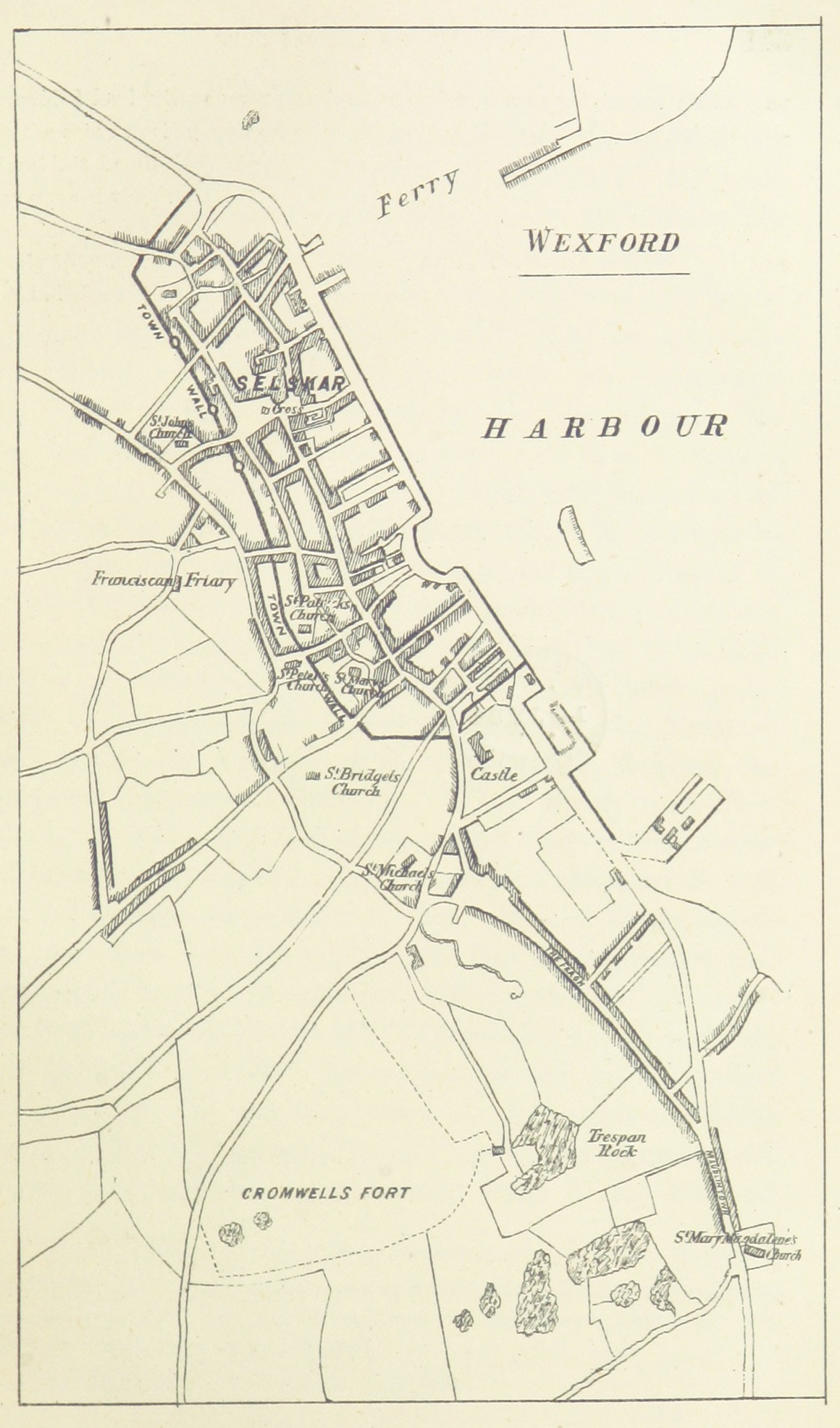
Map of 17th-century Wexford. Cromwell's men camped to the southwest.

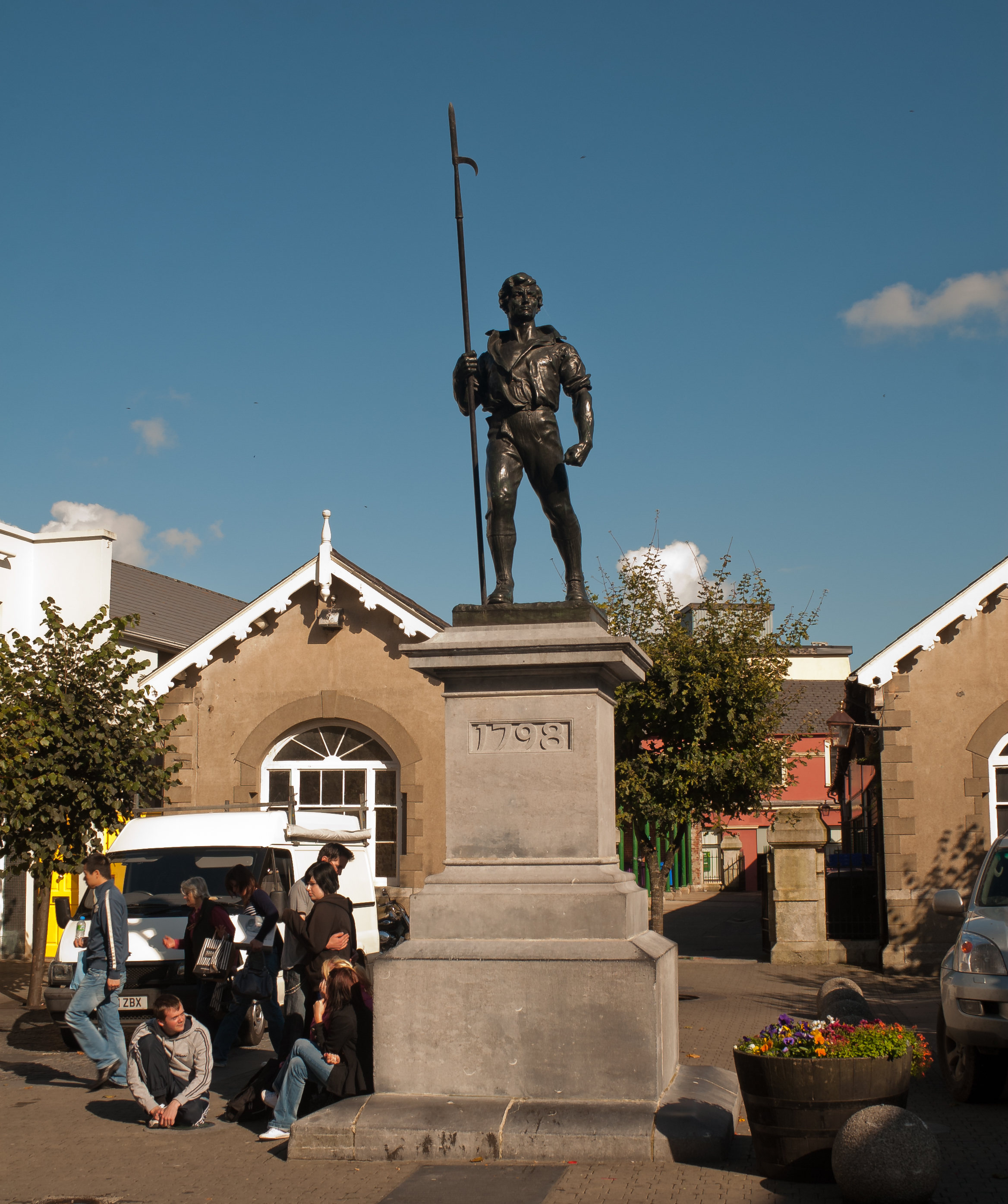
Wexford Pikeman Statue by Oliver Sheppard in memory of the 1798 rebellion

The town was founded by the Vikings in about 800 AD. They named it Veisafjǫrðr or Waesfjord, meaning 'inlet of the mudflats'. In medieval times, the town was known as Weiseforthe in the Yola dialect of Middle English. This, in turn became Wexford in modern English. According to a story recorded in the dindsenchas, the town's Irish name, Loch Garman (lake of Garman), comes from a man named Garman mac Bomma Licce who was chased to the river mouth and drowned as a consequence of stealing the queen's crown from Temair during the feast of Samhain.

For several hundred years (from the 9th to the early 12th century), Wexford was a Viking town, a city-state, largely independent and owing only token dues to the Irish kings of Leinster. However, in May 1169 Dermot MacMurrough, King of Leinster and his Norman ally Robert Fitz-Stephen besieged Wexford. The Norse inhabitants resisted fiercely until the Bishop of Ferns persuaded them to accept a settlement with Dermot.

Wexford became an Old English settlement throughout the early to late Medieval period. An Anglo-Frisian language, known as Yola, was commonly spoken in south Wexford from the time of the Norman invasion in 1169 until it began declining in the mid-19th century. While Yola was extinct by the 1870s, its last speaker, a fisherman from Kilmore Quay named Jack Devereux, died in 1998.

Compared to other parts of Ireland, the Irish language was not as widely spoken in the baronies of Forth and Bargy, which include Wexford town, from the 9th century onwards due to heavy settlement of Norse, Norman and continental Europeans. However, Leinster Irish was the main language spoken in the more northern baronies of County Wexford, and it was spoken widely during the early to late Medieval period, until its decline in the 17th century.

Following the Crusades, the Knights Templar had a presence in Wexford town. Up to the present, their name is perpetuated in the old Knights' Templars' chapel yard of St. John's Cemetery, on Wexford's Upper St. John's Street. Wexford received its first charter in 1318.

County Wexford produced strong support for Confederate Ireland during the 1640s. A fleet of Confederate privateers was based in Wexford town, consisting of sailors from Flanders and Spain as well as local men. Their vessels raided English Parliamentarian shipping, giving some of the proceeds to the Confederate government in Kilkenny. As a result, the town was sacked by the English Parliamentarians during the Cromwellian conquest of Ireland in 1649. Many of its inhabitants were killed and much of the town was burned. In 1659 Solomon Richards was appointed Governor, but he was dismissed and imprisoned following the Restoration the next year.

Wexford's early- and mid- 18th-century history is less frequently remembered than later periods, however, the impact of this period is evident from the architectural fabric of the town such as the gabled Dutch Billy houses such as on Main Street.

County Wexford was the centre of the 1798 rebellion against British rule, and Wexford town was held by the United Irishmen throughout the Wexford Rebellion. Nearby Scullabogue was the scene of a notorious massacre of local loyalists by the United Irishmen, and there were also executions and reprisals at Wexford Bridge.

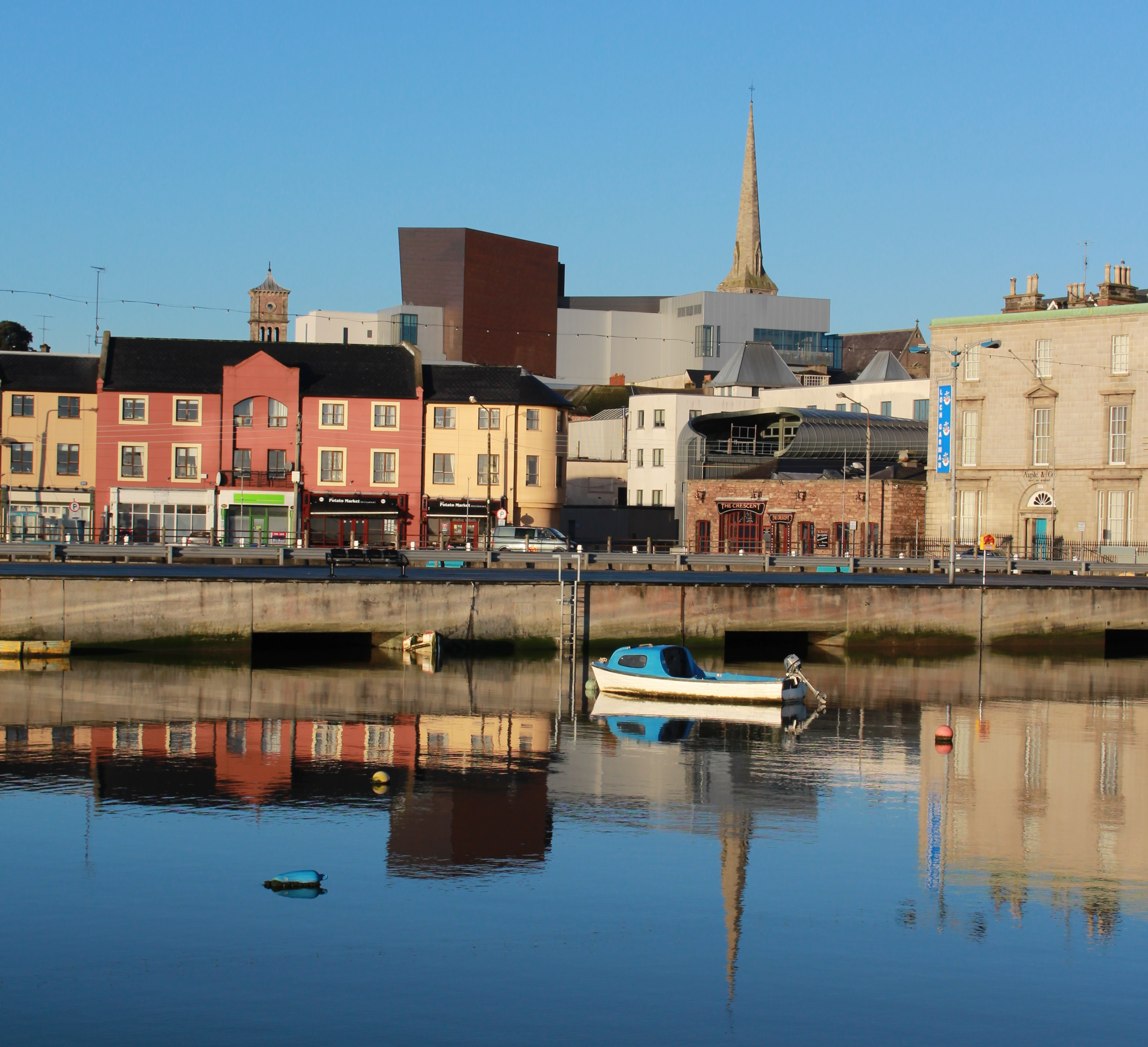
Wexford Opera House, now the National Opera House, amongst other buildings

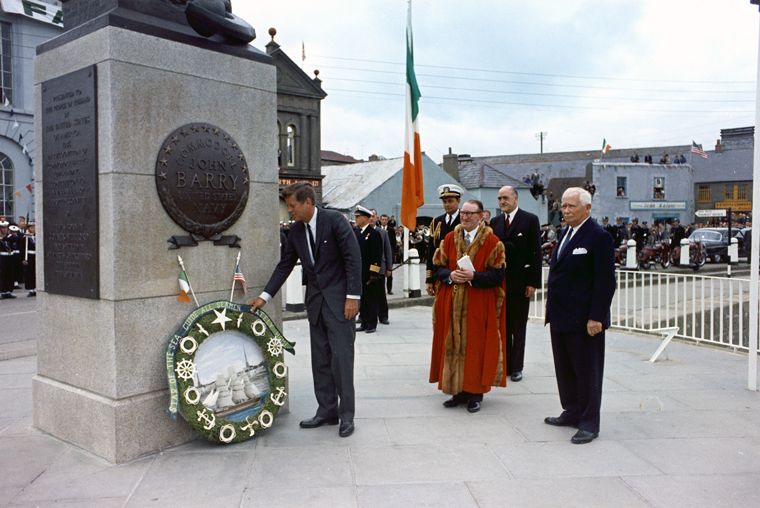
President John F. Kennedy visiting the John Barry Memorial at Crescent Quay, Wexford town, Ireland (27 June 1963)

Redmond Square, near Wexford railway station, commemorates the elder John Edward Redmond (1806–1865) who sat in the House of Commons of the United Kingdom as a Liberal Member of Parliament (MP) for the city of Wexford. The inscription reads: "My heart is with the city of Wexford. Nothing can extinguish that love but the cold soil of the grave." His nephew William Archer Redmond (1825–1880) sat as an MP in Isaac Butt's Home Rule Party from 1872 until 1880. Willie Redmond sat as an MP for Wexford from 1883 until 1885. The younger John Redmond, was a devoted follower of Charles Stewart Parnell and leader of the Irish Parliamentary Party until his death in April 1918. He is interred in the Redmond family vault, at the old Knights' Templars' chapel yard of St. John's Cemetery, Upper St. John's Street.

Redmond Park was formally opened in May 1931 as a memorial to Willie Redmond, who died in 1917 while serving with the 16th (Irish) Division during the Messines offensive and was buried on the Western Front.

== Culture ==
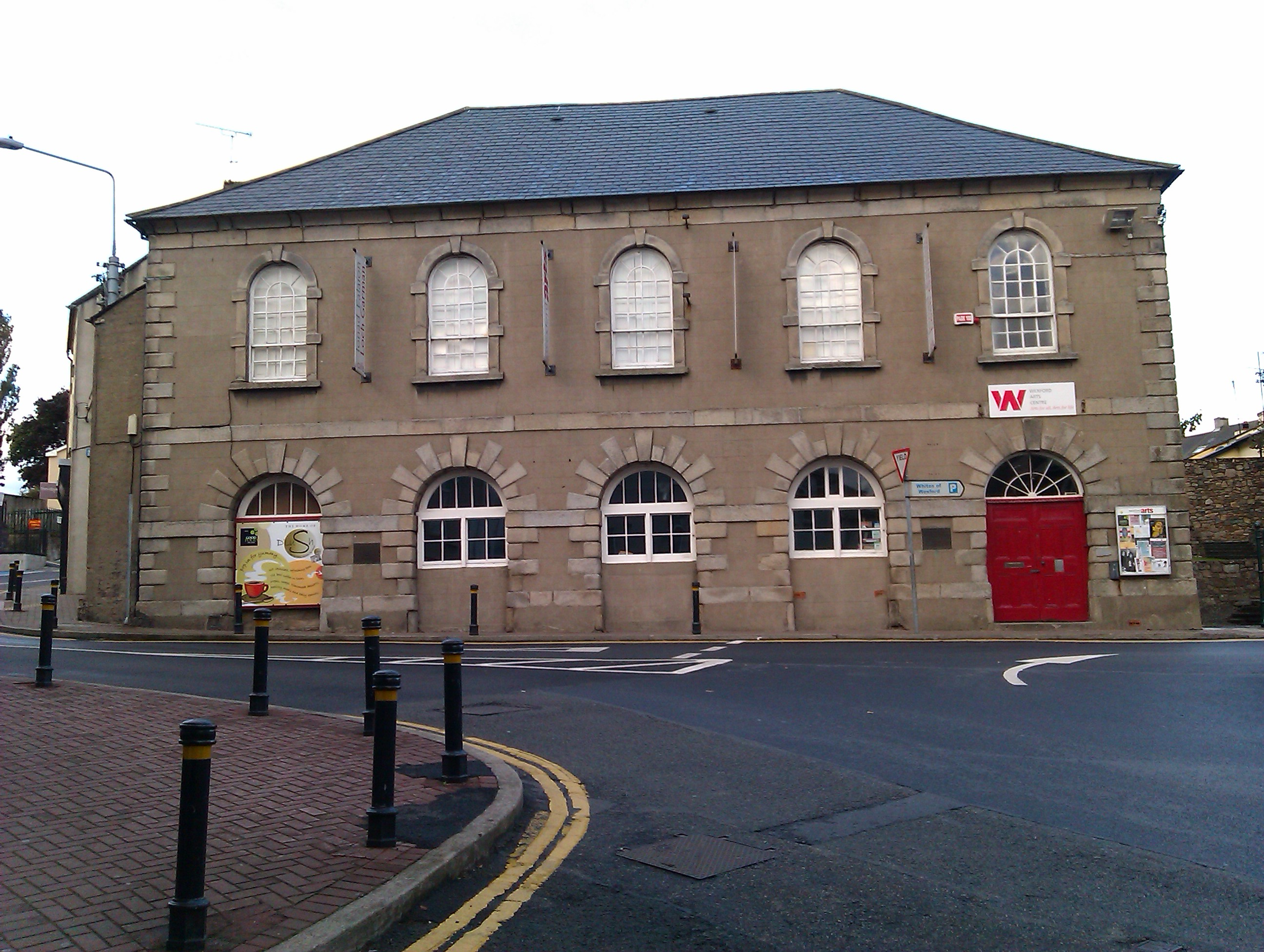
Wexford Arts Centre

Wexford hosts the Wexford Opera Festival every October. Started by Dr Tom Walsh in 1951, the festival has since grown and a fireworks display is sometimes held in conjunction with the annual festival.

Wexford has a number of music and drama venues including:

- The National Opera House (formerly the Wexford Opera House), developed on the site of the historic Theatre Royal opera house;
- the Dun Mhuire Theatre, which holds community theatre events including music events and hosting shows by Oyster Lane Theatre Group and Wexford Pantomime Society;
- Wexford Arts Centre, which hosts exhibitions, theatre, music and dance events;
- St Iberius' Church (Church of Ireland), various concerts are held here.

Wexford is the home of several youth and senior theatre groups, including the Buí Bolg Street Theatre Company, Oyster Lane Theatre Group, Wexford Pantomime Society, Wexford Light Opera Society and Wexford Drama Group. In 2024, Wexford hosted the Fleadh Cheoil festival.

The National Lottery Skyfest was held in Wexford in March 2011 and included a pyrotechnic waterfall on the town's main bridge spanning 300m. Buí Bolg also performed on the night.

Until the mid-nineteenth century, the Yola language could be heard in Wexford, and some words, phrases and place names are still used in the locality, particularly in the baronies of southern Wexford.

== Architecture ==
Notable churches within the town include the "twin churches", Bride Street and Rowe Street with their distinctive spires; St Iberius' Church (Church of Ireland), which dates from the 18th century; Saint Peter's College, with a chapel designed by Augustus Welby Pugin; and Anne Street Presbyterian church. A former Quaker meeting hall is now a band room in High Street. The twin churches can be seen from any part of the town and in 2008, their 150th anniversary was celebrated. The larger twin, on Rowe Street, contains a peal of ten change-ringing bells, cast by Gillett & Johnston in 1930.

In the early 21st century, Wexford saw the redevelopment of its quay front, and residential development at Clonard village. Also, the relocated offices of the Department of Environment were constructed near Wexford General Hospital on Newtown Road and opened in 2010.

== Economy ==
Wexford's success as a seaport declined in the first half of the 20th century because of the constantly changing sands of Wexford Harbour. By 1968 it had become unprofitable to keep dredging a channel from the harbour mouth to the quays in order to accommodate the larger ships of the era, so the port closed. The port had been extremely important to the local economy, with coal being a major import and agricultural machinery and grain being exported. The woodworks which fronted the quays and which were synonymous with Wexford were removed in the 1990s as part of a plan to claim the quay as an amenity for the town as well as retaining it as a commercially viable waterfront.

In the early 20th century, a new port was built about 20 kilometres (12 mi) to the south at Rosslare Harbour, now known as Rosslare Europort. This is a deepwater harbour, unaffected by tides and currents. All major shipping now uses this port and Wexford Port is used only by fishing boats and leisure vessels.

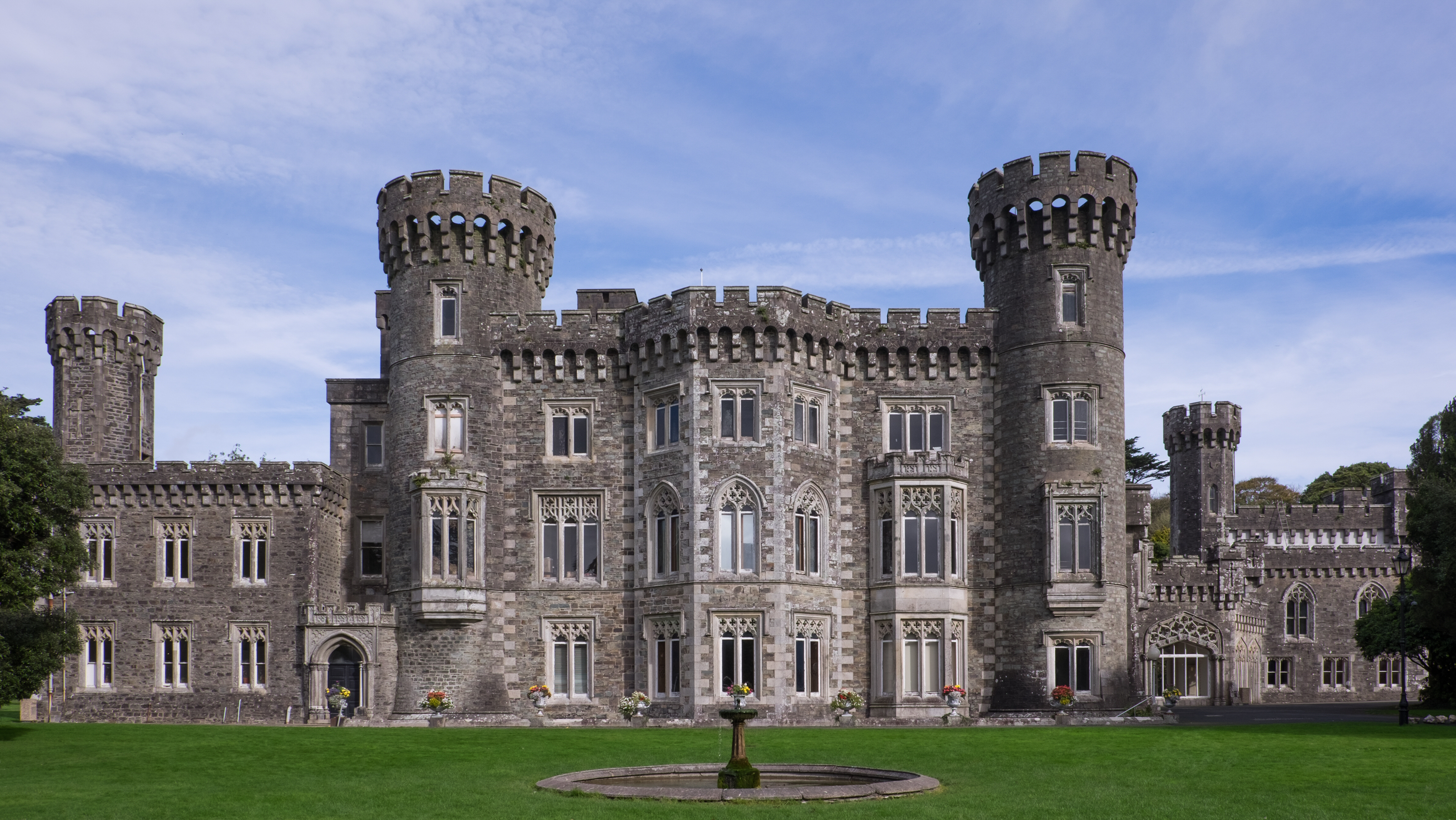
Johnstown Castle

Johnstown Castle, approximately 6 km from Wexford town, is headquarters to Teagasc, the Environmental Protection Agency and the Department of Agriculture, Food and the Marine.

Major private-sector employers in and around the town include Atlantis Seafoods, BNY Mellon, Celtic Linen, Danone, Kent Group Ltd., Sofrimar Ltd., Sulzer, Waters Technology, Wexford Creamery and Zurich Insurance Group. Coca-Cola operates a research plant employing up to 160. Eishtec, which was acquired by Infosys in 2019, operates a call center in Wexford. Pamela Scott, A-wear and other retailers operate in the town. Public sector employers include Wexford County Council and Wexford General Hospital.

== Places of interest ==
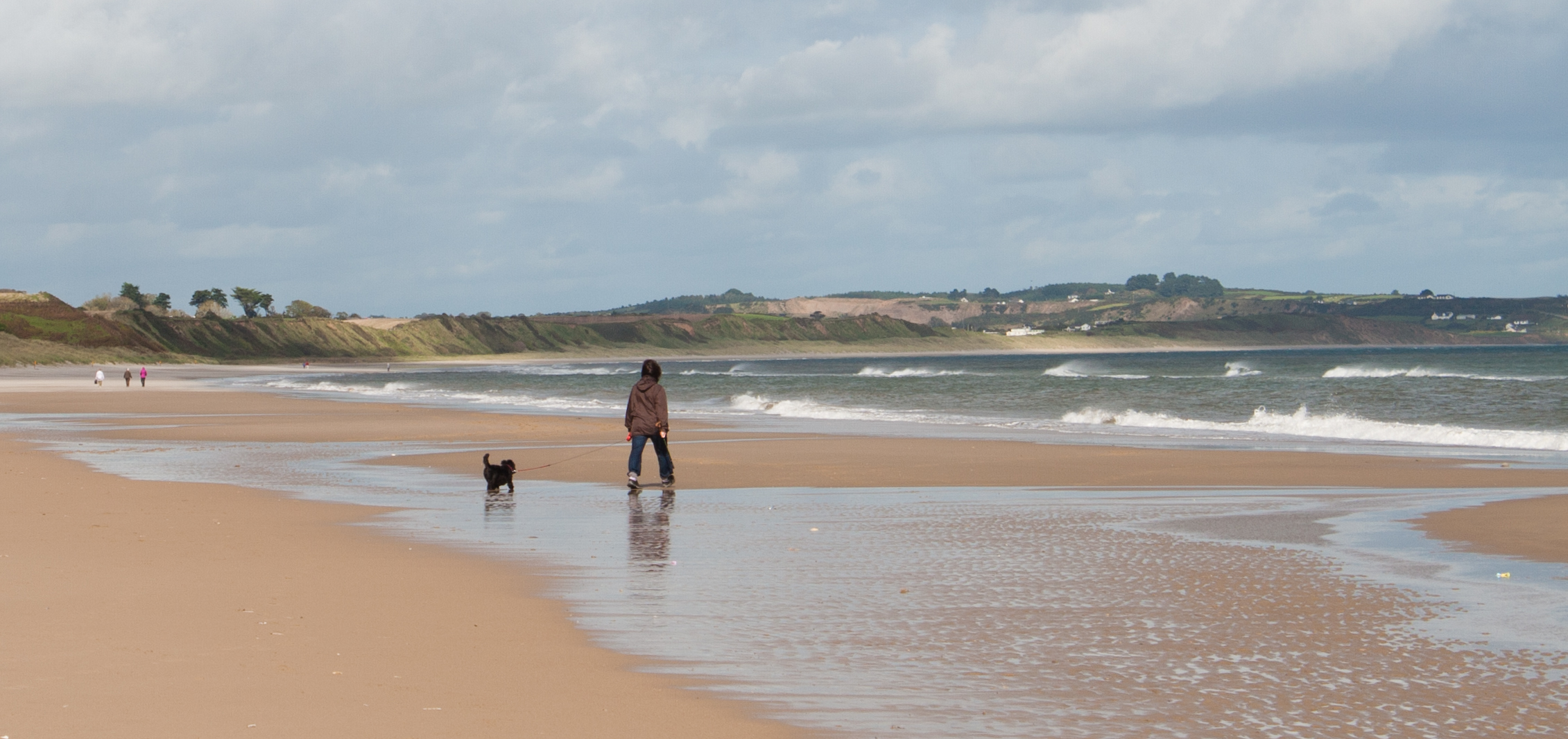
Curracloe Beach is north of Wexford town.

Curracloe Beach, approximately 10 kilometres (6.2 mi) north of Wexford town, was the location in 1997 for the opening scenes of Saving Private Ryan. A nature reserve and walking trail, at Raven Point Wood, is near Curracloe Beach.

The Irish National Heritage Park at Ferrycarrig includes various exhibits spanning 9000 years of Irish history, allowing the visitor to wander around re-creations of historic Irish dwellings including crannogs, Viking houses and Norman forts. The grounds also feature the archaeological site of Newtown, considered the first Norman fortification in Ireland.

The Wexford Wildfowl Reserve is a Ramsar site based on mudflats, (known locally as slobland), just outside Wexford. It is a migratory stop-off point for thousands of ducks, geese, swans and waders. Up to 12,000 (50% of the world's population) of Greenland white-fronted geese spend the winter on the Wexford slobs. There is a visitor centre with exhibitions and an audio-visual show.

== Transport ==
Wexford O'Hanrahan railway station opened on 17 August 1872. On 10 April 1966, the station was named after Michael O'Hanrahan, one of the executed leaders of the 1916 Easter Rising. The railway line from Dublin to Rosslare Harbour runs along the quayside on the northeastern edge of the town. In 2010 the Rosslare Strand-Waterford rail services were suspended, due to budget cuts at Irish Rail.

Wexford is also served by local and national bus networks, primarily Bus Éireann, Wexford Bus and Ardcavan Bus. There are direct bus routes to Dublin, Carlow and Waterford. There are also many local taxi and hackney providers. Wexford Bus also operates a shuttle bus service which has stops at the town's main facilities.

Rosslare Europort is 19 kilometres (12 mi) south of Wexford. Car ferries run between Fishguard and Pembroke in Wales and Cherbourg and Roscoff in France. The ferry companies operating on these routes are Stena Line and Irish Ferries. Foot passengers can use the SailRail tickets from Wexford O'Hanrahan station via Rosslare Europort and Fishguard Harbour to reach Swansea, Cardiff Central and onwards including London Paddington.

The closest airport to Wexford is Waterford Airport which is approximately one hour away (70 kilometres (43 mi)), but is not served by commercial flights. Dublin Airport is the closest airport to Wexford which operates commercial flights, which is approximately two hours away.

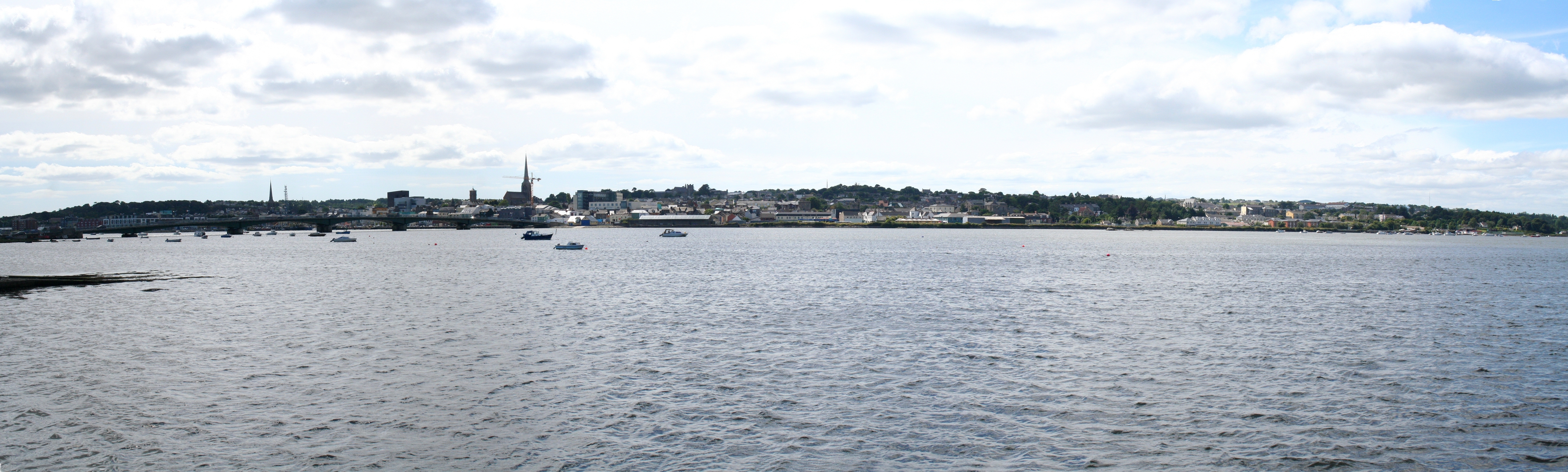
Wexford panorama

== Sport ==
=== Association football ===
Wexford Football Club was admitted to the League of Ireland in 2007. The club was the brainchild of former property developer and politician Mick Wallace, who funded the construction of a complex for the new team's home at Newcastle, Ferrycarrig. In 2015, the team won the League of Ireland First Division. The club launched Wexford Youths WFC, a Women's National League team, in 2011. A new team, Yola FC, was proposed in 2020 but was refused a license by the FAI.

=== Gaelic football ===
Wexford is also home to several Gaelic Athletic Association clubs. Though the town was traditionally associated with Gaelic football, with six teams providing ample outlets for its youngsters, it was not until 1960 that hurling took its foothold, with much due to local man Oliver "Hopper" McGrath's contribution to the county's All-Ireland Hurling Final triumph over reigning champions Tipperary. Having scored an early second-half goal to effectively kill off the opposition, McGrath went on to be the first man from the town of Wexford to receive an All-Ireland Hurling winner's medal.

Although the team has not achieved county senior football success since 1956, St. Johns Volunteers of Wexford Town hold a record eleven county senior titles, as well as five minor titles as of 2015. Other notable Gaelic football clubs in the town are Sarsfields, St. Mary's of Maudlintown, Clonard and St. Joseph's.

=== Hurling ===
One of the town's local hurling clubs, Faythe Harriers, won the Wexford Junior Hurling Championship twice, in 1953 and 1989. The senior side has also won five Wexford Senior Hurling Championships.

=== Other sports ===
The clubhouse and course of Wexford Golf Club were finished in 2007.

As of 2026, Wexford Wanderers RFC was playing in Division 1B of the Leinster League.

Ireland's former boxing head coach and Olympian Billy Walsh is a native of Wexford and is associated with St. Ibars/Joseph's boxing club in the town.

== Education ==
There are five secondary schools serving the population of the town. These are Wexford CBS, Loreto Secondary School (girls' school); St Peter's College (boys' school); Presentation Secondary School (girls' school); and The Vocational College/Selskar College (mixed school).

== Climate ==
Wexford has an oceanic climate (Köppen: Cfb).

Climate data for Wexford
Month	Jan	Feb	Mar	Apr	May	Jun	Jul	Aug	Sep	Oct	Nov	Dec	Year
Mean daily maximum °C (°F)	8.8 (47.8)	8.6 (47.5)	8.9 (48.0)	10.1 (50.2)	12.2 (54.0)	14.5 (58.1)	16.1 (61.0)	16.5 (61.7)	15.7 (60.3)	13.9 (57.0)	11.3 (52.3)	9.7 (49.5)	12.2 (54.0)
Daily mean °C (°F)	7.6 (45.7)	7.4 (45.3)	7.7 (45.9)	9.0 (48.2)	11.2 (52.2)	13.6 (56.5)	15.2 (59.4)	15.6 (60.1)	14.7 (58.5)	12.8 (55.0)	10.2 (50.4)	8.5 (47.3)	11.1 (52.0)
Mean daily minimum °C (°F)	6.4 (43.5)	6.3 (43.3)	6.5 (43.7)	7.9 (46.2)	10.1 (50.2)	12.5 (54.5)	14.1 (57.4)	14.5 (58.1)	13.6 (56.5)	11.7 (53.1)	9.0 (48.2)	7.3 (45.1)	10.0 (50.0)
Average precipitation mm (inches)	88.1 (3.47)	76.6 (3.02)	71.8 (2.83)	64.3 (2.53)	63.5 (2.50)	68.3 (2.69)	75.6 (2.98)	76.2 (3.00)	81.3 (3.20)	133.5 (5.26)	119.9 (4.72)	109.3 (4.30)	1,028.4 (40.5)
Source: Weather.Directory

== Administration ==
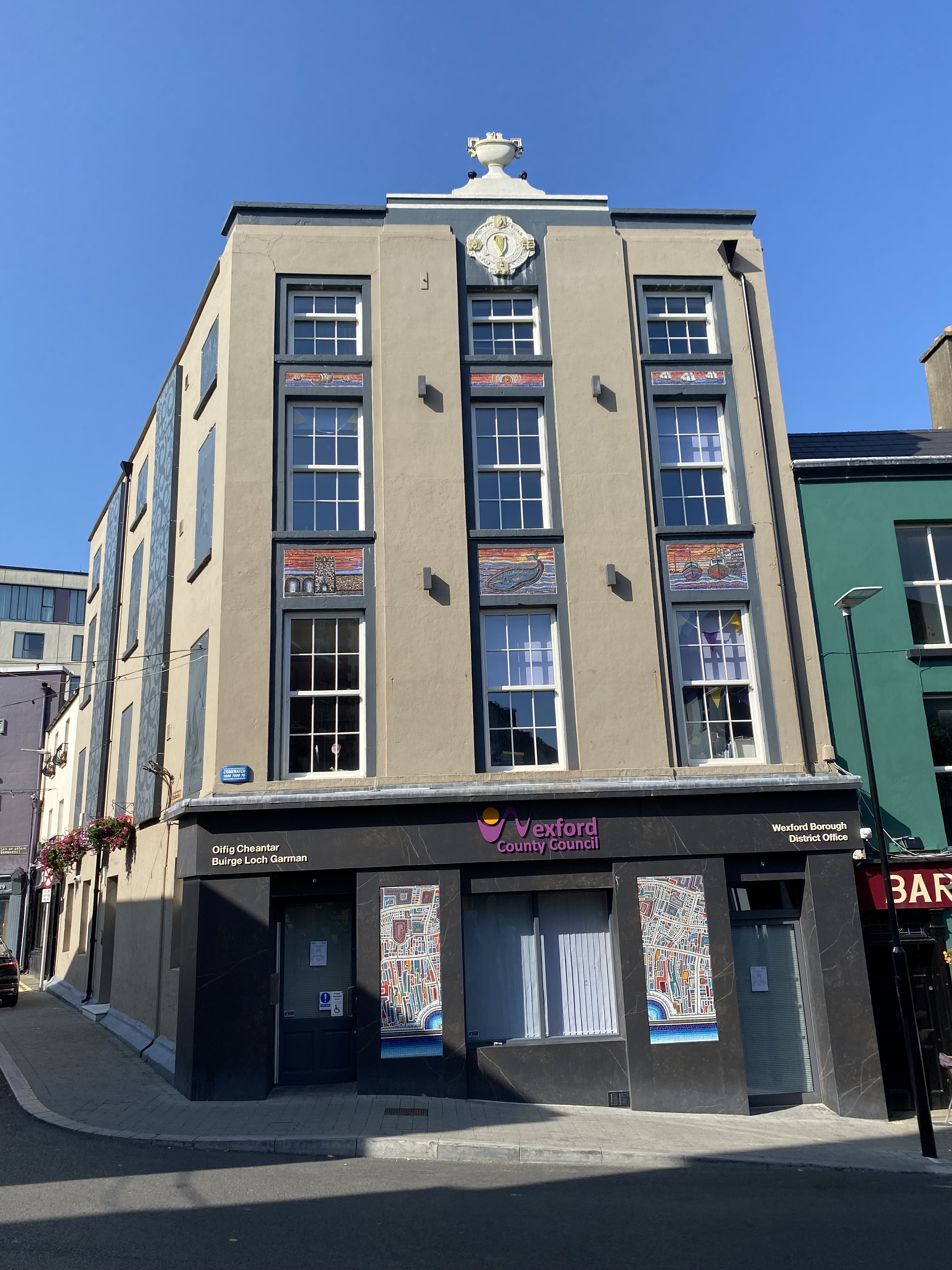
Wexford Borough District Office

The historic borough of Wexford was abolished under the Municipal Corporations (Ireland) Act 1840. However, by petition, it was re-established in 1846. Under the Local Government (Ireland) Act 1898, the area became an urban district, while retaining the style of a borough corporation. Wexford Borough Corporation became a borough council in 2002. The boundary of the town was extended in 2008.

On 1 June 2014, the borough council was dissolved and the administration of the town was amalgamated with Wexford County Council. The local electoral area of Wexford forms the borough district of Wexford, as the town retains the right to be described as a borough. The chair of the borough district uses the title of mayor, rather than Cathaoirleach.

The parliamentary borough of Wexford returned two MPs to the Irish House of Commons until 1801. Under the Act of Union, the parliamentary borough returned one MP to the United Kingdom House of Commons, until its abolition under the Redistribution of Seats Act 1885. It was thereafter represented by the South Wexford from 1885 to 1922, and by the Dáil constituency of Wexford from 1921 to the present.

== Notable people ==
- John Banville, writer
- Clementina Rowe Butler, missionary
- Eoin Colfer, writer
- Robert McClure, Arctic explorer
- Brendan Corish, politician
- Mary Frances Crowley, educator and nurse
- Thomas D'Arcy McGee, Canadian politician
- Kevin Doyle, footballer
- Jane Elgee 'Speranza', mother of Oscar Wilde
- Mary Fitzgerald, trade unionist
- Gerald Fleming, meteorologist
- Brendan Howlin, politician
- Rianna Jarrett, footballer
- William Kehoe, iron founder
- William Kenealy, recipient of the Victoria Cross
- Larry Kirwan, writer and musician
- William Lamport, Irish soldier upon whom Zorro is said to be based
- Michael Londra, singer
- Declan Lowney, director
- Charlie Murphy, actress
- Fintan O'Carroll, composer
- Dan O'Herlihy, Oscar-nominated actor
- Chris O'Neill (Oney), animator and internet personality
- Billy Roche, playwright
- Dick Roche, politician
- Jem Roche, boxer
- Declan Sinnott, musician
- John Sinnott, recipient of the Victoria Cross
- Pierce Turner, singer-songwriter
- Billy Walsh, boxer/coach
- Dean Walsh, European boxing medallist
- John Welsh, writer
- Cry Before Dawn, 1980s rock band from Wexford

== Twinning ==
Wexford is twinned with the following places:

- Annapolis, MD, United States
- Couëron, Loire-Atlantique, Pays de la Loire, France
- Lugo, Ravenna, Emilia-Romagna, Italy

== See also ==
- List of Market Houses in Ireland
- List of towns and villages in Ireland
