= Colony of Tasmania =

British colony (1856–1901)

- 1856–1901
- Flag Coat of arms
- Anthem: God Save the Queen
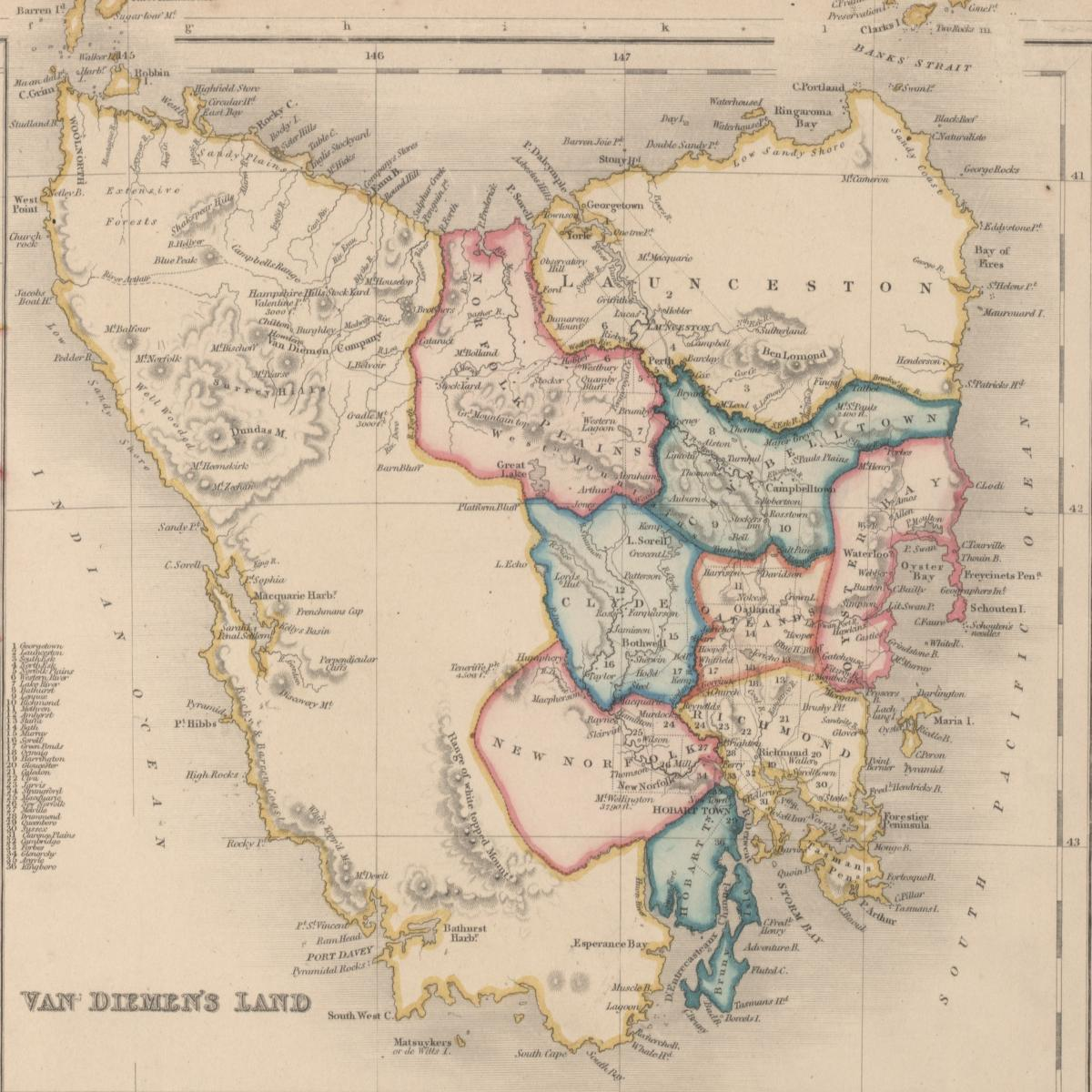
- Map of the colony in 1852
- Status: British colony
- Capital: Hobart
- Common languages: English (official); Tasmanian languages
- Religion: Anglicanism
- Government: Constitutional monarchy under a responsible government
- Monarch
  - 1856-1901: Victoria
- Governor
  - 1856-1861: Henry Young first
  - 1901: Arthur Havelock last
- Legislature: Parliament
  - Upper house: Legislative Council
  - Lower house: House of Assembly
- History
  - Responsible self-government: 1856
  - Federation of Australia: 1 January 1901

Area
  - Total: 20,215 sq mi (52,360 km^{2})

Population
  - Census: 115,705 (1881)
  - Density: 4.387/sq mi (1.7/km^{2})
- Currency: Pound sterling
Preceded by	Succeeded by
Van Diemen's Land	Tasmania
- Today part of: Australia; ∟Tasmania

The Colony of Tasmania (more commonly referred to simply as "Tasmania") was a British colony that existed on the island of Tasmania from 1856 until 1901, when it federated together with the five other Australian colonies to form the Commonwealth of Australia. The possibility of the colony was established when the Parliament of the United Kingdom passed the Australian Constitutions Act in 1850, granting the right of legislative power to each of the six Australian colonies. The Legislative Council of Van Diemen's Land drafted a new constitution which they passed in 1854, and it was given royal assent by Queen Victoria in 1855. Later in that year the Privy Council approved the colony changing its name from "Van Diemen's Land" to "Tasmania", and in 1856, the newly elected bicameral parliament of Tasmania sat for the first time, establishing Tasmania as a self-governing colony of the British Empire. Tasmania was often referred to as one of the "most British" colonies of the Empire.

The Colony suffered from economic fluctuations, but for the most part was prosperous, experiencing steady growth. With few external threats and strong trade links with the Empire, the Colony of Tasmania enjoyed many fruitful periods in the late nineteenth century, becoming a world-centre of shipbuilding. It raised a local defence force which eventually played a significant role in the Second Boer War in South Africa, and Tasmanian soldiers in that conflict won the first two Victoria Crosses won by Australians. Tasmanians voted in favour of federation with the largest majority of all the Australian colonies, and on 1 January 1901, the Colony of Tasmania, became the Australian state of Tasmania.

== History ==
=== Self-government ===
A campaign for self-government in Van Diemen's Land had first begun in 1842. A growing resentment against penal transportation to the colony, and a lack of effective legislation led to agitators lobbying for better representation. On 31 October 1845 the 'Patriotic six' walked out of the Legislative Council, leaving it without a quorum, but by 23 March 1847 they had been restored. In 1849 the Australasian Anti-Transportation League was established in Launceston, and had soon established branches in the other Australian colonies. The Australian Republican Association (ARA) was founded at this time, but failed to gain much support.

On 5 August 1850, the Parliament of the United Kingdom passed the Australian Constitutions Act, granting the right of legislative power to the Australian colonies, and called for a 'blended' council, which was to be part nominated and part elected. The formerly appointed Tasmanian Legislative Council held its first popular elections 21 October 1851, and the newly elected members joined their appointed colleagues for the first time on 30 December 1851. On 19 August 1853 the Legislative Council appointed a select committee to draft a constitution, which was passed by the Council on 31 October 1855. By January 1855, the first Governor of Tasmania, Sir Henry Fox Young had been appointed. The constitution, calling for a new bicameral parliament received royal assent from Queen Victoria on 1 May 1855. On 21 July 1855, the Privy Council granted the application to change the colony's name from "Van Diemen's Land" to "Tasmania", and on 24 October 1855, a tumultuous crowd gathered in Hobart to hear that the Tasmanian Constitution Act had been granted royal assent. On 8 February 1856, the old Legislative Council met for the last time, and between September and October, elections were held across the state for the new Tasmanian Legislative Council, and Tasmanian House of Assembly.

On 1 November 1856, Governor Sir Henry Fox Young proclaimed former British Army officer, William Champ as the first Premier of Tasmania, and the new bicameral parliament met for the first time on 2 December 1856, marking the beginning of self-government for the Colony of Tasmania.

=== End of transportation ===
Flag of the Australasian Anti-Transportation League

In 1849 the Reverend John West formed the Anti-Transportation League of Van Diemen's Land to politically oppose the penal transportation of British convicts to Van Diemen's Land which had been occurring since 1804. By 1851 it had expanded to other colonies including New South Wales and Victoria and soon expanded to become the Australasian Anti-Transportation League. In the first partial-election of the Legislative Council of Van Diemen's Land on 21 October 1851, members of the Australasian Anti-Transportation League won all 16 of the elected seats, showing how popular the movement had become, and how opposed to transportation the free population of Van Diemen's Land was. One of the first actions taken by the new Council was to vote 16 to 4 in favour of sending a letter of request to Queen Victoria asking for her to revoke the Order in Council permitting transportation to Van Diemen's Land and Norfolk Island, despite the opposition of Lieutenant Governor William Denison.

The beginning of the Victorian gold rush provided further argument, as it was felt that the opportunity of free passage aboard convict transports and the chance of escaping to the gold fields would provide an incentive to would-be offenders. The last convict ship to be sent from England, the St. Vincent, arrived in 1853, and on 10 August 1853 Jubilee festivals in Hobart and Launceston celebrated 50 years of European settlement with the official end of transportation. Celebratory medallions were minted and distributed to school children.

=== Growth of Tasmania ===
The era immediately following the granting of responsible self-government brought a new confidence to the colony. Whilst Tasmania suffered a setback with a large loss of working-age males to the Victorian gold-fields, many social and cultural improvements soon developed. Horse-drawn buses between Hobart and New Town to the immediate north provide the colony's first public transport in 1856. The following year the first telegraph line between Hobart and Launceston was laid, and coal gas became available for private use, and illuminating Hobart's street lamps. Tasmania continued to be a centre of shipbuilding excellence. However, growing competition, and later, a shift towards steel-constructed vessels soon threatened Tasmania's place as a world leader. The late 1850s also saw the Hobart Savings Bank and a Council of Education formed, and the new Government House opened.

The 1860s saw a period of stagnation and economic depression in Tasmania, but it was punctuated by several highlights, including the opening of the new Hobart General Post Office, and the Tasmanian Museum and Art Gallery, a submarine communications cable between Tasmania and Victoria, the beginning of construction for the Launceston and Western Railway, the colony's first railway, and Tasmania's first royal visit, by the Duke of Edinburgh, Prince Albert. Compulsory education was introduced in 1868, making Tasmania one of the first colonies in the British Empire to adopt such an enlightened policy.

=== Withdrawal of British forces ===
The British Army had garrisoned Van Diemen's Land with a rotating roster of British regiments since the first establishment of a colony there in 1803. In the wake of the Crimean War (1853–56) and the Indian Mutiny (1857), a Royal Commission was held under Secretary of State for War, Jonathan Peel into the structure of the Army. His proposed reforms met with objection from the East India Company, who wished to retain their own armed forces. However, a later Secretary for War, Edward Cardwell began a successful programme of reforms known as the Cardwell reforms. Although he lost his post when his government was removed from office, a later replacement, Hugh Childers reinvigorated the process with the Childers reforms. One of Cardwell's major proposals to increase troop numbers was the withdrawal of British garrisons from the self-governing colonies (to be replaced by locally raised units) which would save money and allow for more troops to be available for deployment in times of war, which he announced in 1869. By 1870 the troops were being withdrawn, and by 1871, more than 26,000 men had returned to Great Britain from all over the British Empire.

This meant that at short notice the Government of Tasmania was given the responsibility of raising its own defences. At the time of the announcement, the 2nd Battalion, the 14th (Buckinghamshire, The Prince of Wales's Own) Regiment of Foot was stationed in Tasmania. In March 1870 the 2nd Battalion, the Royal Irish Regiment arrived in Hobart from New Zealand to oversee the withdrawal of the Buckinghamshires, but by 6 September 1870 they were also departing, leaving the colony completely bereft of defence forces.

Although earlier attempts to establish locally raised volunteer defence forces had been made, such as the establishment of the Hobart Town Volunteer Artillery Company in 1859, and a similar company in Launceston in 1860, and twelve companies of "volunteer" infantry were also raised. In 1867 the infantry companies were disbanded, and the artillery increased by one battery, but most of these units were short-lived. The arrival of three Imperial Russian Navy warships, the Africa, Plastun, and Vestnik in 1872 caused a great deal of alarm in the colony, and led to vigorous discussion about the colony's defences. The threat of war with Russia in 1876 further hastened the establishment of both locally raised defence forces, and the modernisation of coastal defences, and in 1878 the Volunteer Act was passed, which established the Tasmanian Volunteer Force. The following year, controversial Canadian Priest Charles Chiniquy visited Hobart to lecture on religion, but his second lecture descended into rioting when Catholics broke into the Hobart Town Hall. It took 150 constables and 400 armed volunteers to break up the rioting in what became known as the 'Chiniquy Affair', and this added weight to the argument that the colony desperately needed a permanent military presence.

In 1878 the Tasmanian Volunteer Rifle Regiment was raised in both the north and south of the colony. By 1880 a defence force of 600 men had been established, and consisted of 200 artillery, 350 infantry and about fifty mounted infantry. In 1883 the Tasmanian Engineers were formed, and trained as a Torpedo boat crew for the newly acquired TB1. By 1885 the strength of the Tasmanian Military Forces was 1200 men, the maximum permitted by law at a time of peace. However, by 1893, and additional "auxiliary" force of 1500 had also been raised. By 1896, the Regiment had three battalions. They were 1st battalion in Hobart, 2nd battalion in Launceston, and 3rd battalion in the North West.

=== Consolidation ===
The Flag of Tasmania was officially adopted following a proclamation by Tasmanian colonial Governor Frederick Aloysius Weld on 25 September 1876, and was first published in the Tasmanian Gazette the same day. The governor's proclamation here were three official flags, they being the Governor's flag, the Tasmania Government vessel flag, and a Tasmania merchant flag. Up until 1856 when Tasmania was granted responsible self-government, the Union Flag and the British ensign were primarily used on state occasions.

The population of the colony began to rise quite rapidly in the period immediately following the discovery of gold. In 1880 the colony's population was 114, 762, but by 1884, it had reached 130,541. The period of growth also created a substantial improvement in the standard of living for Tasmanians. In the period from 1875 to 1884, the total value of personal saving in the colony's five existing banks increased over threefold from £1,227,585, to £4,022,077. The total valuation of owned property also rose from £604,347 to £837,916.

=== Boer War ===
In 1899 the Colonial Tasmanian Military Forces responded to the request for military assistance in South Africa. The war had been expected in both Britain and the Australian colonies, and planning had begun as a result. The initial request from Britain was made for two of the colony's three Ranger Infantry units. Colonel William Vincent Legge, the commander of the Colonial Tasmanian Military Forces, sought to also establish a mounted reconnaissance unit, and toured the colony. He was very impressed by the shooting and riding skills of many of the colony's wealthy young farm boys, and formed a Tasmanian Imperial Bushmen unit from them.

A Tasmanian colonial contingent was sent to the Second Boer War, consisting of the 1st and 2nd Tasmanian Bushmen. These mounted infantry units were primarily made up of volunteers who had good bushcraft, riding and shooting skills. The first contingent, known as the First Tasmanian (Mounted Infantry) Contingent, consisted of approximately 80 men under the command of Captain Cyril St Clair Cameron. The Second contingent, known as the Second (Tasmanian Bushmen) Contingent, departed from Hobart on 5 March 1900, and were under the command of Lieutenant-Colonel E.T Wallack. They arrived at Cape Town on 31 March, and were sent to Beira, where they formed part of General Carrington's column, operating in Rhodesia and Western Transvaal. A third Tasmanian contingent, the Third Tasmanian (Imperial Bushmen) Contingent, departed on 26 April, and the Fourth Tasmanian (Imperial Bushmen) Contingent followed soon after. A branch of Tasmanian Special Service Officers also accompanied the Tasmanian contingents. In total, 28 officers and 822 other ranks were sent from the colony.

The first two Victoria Crosses awarded to Australians in that conflict were earned by Private John Hutton Bisdee and Lieutenant Guy George Egerton Wylly, both members of the Tasmanian Bushmen, in action near Warm Bad in 1900. On 1 September, they were part of a small party consisting entirely of Tasmanians, who were escorting an Army Service Corps unit sent to round up cattle at Warmbaths, 60 miles north of Pretoria. They were ambushed by a Boer Commando, but fought exceptionally well. Bisdee and Wylly received their VCs for heroically recovering wounded and un-horsed men under fire from the enemy.

=== Federation ===
The Colony of Tasmania and its citizens played a prominent role in the move towards federation for the six British colonies in Australia.

Tasmanian lawyer and politician Andrew Inglis Clark had travelled throughout the United States of America in 1890, where he learned an appreciation of both the federal system of government, and grew to appreciate republicanism. He represented Tasmania at the 1890 Constitutional Convention where he presented a draft constitution that he had written on a previous trip to London. At the Constitutional Convention of 1891, by then the Attorney-General of Tasmania, Clark spoke as the leading authority on the American constitutional system, which was highly influential in the development of the bicameral system in Australia. Clark also spoke effectively of creating a federal system which provided for the protection of the smaller and more vulnerable economies of Tasmania, South Australia and Western Australia. By 1891 Clark had completed his final draft constitution which he sent copies of to Alfred Deakin, Edmund Barton, and Thomas Playford, and although it was never intended to be a final version, 86 out of the original 128 sections from his draft made it into the final version of the Constitution of Australia. .

In the 1898 constitutional referendum, 11,797 voted in favour of federation, and 2,716 opposed, a majority of nearly 4 to 1. Tasmania held their final constitutional referendum on 27 June 1899, and in that referendum to opposition vote had further reduced to 791, and with 13,437 voters in favour of federation, the Colony of Tasmania had provided the highest percentage of support shown in any of the Australian colonies.

== Society ==
Following the raucous years of the 1830s and 40s in which the Royal Navy had threatened to ban shore visits in Hobart because of debauchery, licentious behaviour and gambling, the colony had evolved to become quite conservative. The adoption of responsible self-government and the cessation of transportation had seem Tasmanian society deliberately seek to break with its past as a penal colony, and establish the more sophisticated trappings of proper British polite society. The influence of Governor John Franklin, and his wife Jane had done much to provide that sense of refinement, Tasmania had previously been lacking. They had promoted culture and education, Jane Franklin had created the Lady Jane Franklin Museum, including replicas of the Elgin Marbles, and John Franklin has established the Royal Society of Tasmania - the first outside of the United Kingdom.

=== Religion ===
Religion played an important part in the lives of European Tasmanians in the colonial era. This is evidenced by the large number of isolated churches that survive from that period. Following the Castle Hill convict rebellion in 1804, Catholicism had been outlawed in the Australian colonies out of fear of further Irish Catholic uprisings. This had permitted Protestant religions, particularly Anglicanism to gain a strong foothold in Van Diemen's Land. The Colony's first Preacher, Robert Knopwood, had vigorously pushed the Church of England's cause for much of his time in the colony. Although always in a small minority, Judaism also existed in the colony since its foundation. The indigenous Tasmanians had attempted to maintain their traditional religion, but had been forcibly converted to Anglicanism.

Moral and religious reform played a very important role in the education and rehabilitation of the convicts transported to Van Diemen's Land. By 1837 the Van Diemen's Land Church Act was passed, respecting the rights of worship, and financially aiding the 'three grand divisions of Christianity' – the Churches of England, Scotland and Rome. By this time, the Methodist, Presbyterian, Congregationalist, Quaker and Baptist churches had all established themselves in the Colony of Tasmania to lesser degrees.

The Anglican See of Tasmania was created in 1843, and shortly after Francis Russell Nixon, the first Bishop of Tasmania arrived. Nixon was highly successful in promoting a form of High Anglicanism, and linking his denomination with a patriotic sense of national identity under the banner of 'God, King, and Country'. Not to be outdone, the first Catholic Bishop of Tasmania, Robert Wilson arrived the following year, preaching a form of pious asceticism. An unintended consequence of the Great Famine of Ireland was a huge influx of Irish Catholic settlers in the 1850s, reestablishing Catholicism in the colony. In 1866 St Mary's Catholic Cathedral was opened, but without the originally designed tower. The magnificent St David's Anglican Cathedral, seat of the Bishop of Tasmania, and administrative centre of the Anglican Diocese of Tasmania, was designed by George Frederick Bodley, in high Gothic style and completed in 1868.

By 1861, 52 percent of Tasmanians were Anglican, 22 percent were Catholic, 10 percent were Presbyterian, 7 percent were Methodist, and 4 percent were Congregationalist, with smaller numbers of Jews, Quakers and other faiths. By 1891, the number Catholics had fallen to 18 percent, Methodists had risen to 12 percent, Presbyterians had dropped to 7 percent, Congregationalists had dropped to 3 percent, Anglicans were just over 50 percent, and Baptists registered at 2 percent.

=== Recreation ===
As soon as the first British settlers had established themselves in the colony, they had begun to enjoy similar forms of recreation as they had enjoyed in Britain. Cricket was first played in 1803, and rugby and football are both recorded as having been played soon after. By 1814, cricket was a popular pastime around the Christmas period, and by the 1820s regular club competitions were taking place. Hobart Town Cricket Club and Derwent Cricket Club were established in the 1830s, and Launceston Cricket Club was founded in 1841, although Hobart Town no longer survives. In 1850 the first 'North' versus 'South' match was held in Oatlands, and won by the South. The success of the match prompted promoters to organise an inter-colonial match, and the first, first class cricket match played in Tasmania, which was also the first ever first-class cricket match in Australia, was played in 1851 between Victoria and Tasmania in Launceston at the Launceston Racecourse. The game was billed as 'The Gentlemen of Port Phillip versus the Gentlemen of Van Diemen's Land'. The game featured four-ball overs and no boundaries, attracted a crowd of about 2,500 spectators, and it was a timeless match, but only lasted for two days. Tasmania emerged victorious by 3 wickets.

By the 1860s the popularity of rugby and football was diminished by the arrival of Australian rules football from Victoria, which quickly took off in popularity. The first organised match was held in 1859, the Tasmanian Football League was formed in 1879, making it arguably the third oldest football competition in the world, and by 1884 the first inter-colonial match was held against Victoria. Yacht and boat racing had quickly taken off, as the colony was located on an island, most people were familiar with sailing, and enjoyed it as a pastime. In 1838 the Royal Hobart Regatta had begun, and celebrated many forms of aquatic competitions. Horse racing was also quickly established as a popular pastime, with organised racing first held in Van Diemen's Land in 1814 at Newtown, near Hobart. The Tasmanian Turf Club (TTC) was formed in 1871 but the major club, the Tasmanian Racing Club (TRC) was not established until 1874.

The Theatre Royal was established in 1834, making it the oldest still operating theatre in Australia. A strong literary tradition also developed, with famous titles such as Quintus Servinton by Henry Savery (1831) and For the Term of His Natural Life by Marcus Clarke (1874) being produced in the colony. Other less sophisticated forms of entertainment, such as cock fighting and dog fighting were also popular in Tasmania in the late nineteenth century.

== Government ==
The Colony of Tasmania had responsible achieved self-government in 1856, after a long and difficult campaign. The Tasmanian Constitution had been ratified by Queen Victoria on 1 May 1855, laying out the framework through which Tasmania was to be governed. As with the modern Australian state of Tasmania, the Colony of Tasmania was governed according to the principles of the Westminster System, a form of parliamentary government based on the model of the United Kingdom. Legislative power rested with the Parliament of Tasmania, which consisted of the Crown, represented by the Governor of Tasmania, and the two Houses, the Tasmanian Legislative Council and the Tasmanian House of Assembly.

== Demographics ==
According to the 1881 Census, males were counted at 61,162 compared to 54,543 females for a combined total of 115,705 people. The birth to death rate was 896 births to 481 deaths in 1881. The majority of the population were born in Tasmania and constituted 69.13% (79,991). Other places of birth include other Australian colonies (3987 or 3.44%), England, Wales, Scotland and Ireland (28,243 or 24.41%), other British possessions, and at sea (872 or 0.76%), Foreign countries (2223 or 1.93%) and not specified counting for 389 people or 0.33%.

Religion

The majority of the Tasmanian population adhered to Anglicanism under the British Church of England. However there was also a sizeable Roman Catholic minority. In addition to this, there were also small populations of Protestants which notably included Lutheranism and Presbyterianism as well as non-Christian faiths and Irreligious people also constituting a very small proportion of the population.

Largest Towns

1. Hobart, City (Population in 1881: 21,118)
2. Launceston (Population: 12,752)
3. New Town (Population: 1720)
4. Longford (Population: 1286)
5. Westbury (Population: 1156)
6. New Norfolk (Population: 1036)
7. Campbell Town (Population: 948)
8. Waratah (Population: 874)
9. Deloraine (Population: 836)
10. Queenborough (Population: 795)

== See also ==
- British Empire
- Tasmania
- Van Diemen's Land
