= John Buckland =

John Buckland may refer to:

- John Buckland (Westbury MP) (died 1563), Member of Parliament for Westbury
- John Buckland (Somerset MP) (fl. 1650s), Member of Parliament for Somerset
- John Richard Buckland (1819–1874), Australian school teacher and first headmaster of The Hutchins School, Tasmania
- John Francis Buckland (1825–1910), Australian politician, member of the Legislative Assembly of Queensland
- John Buckland (New Zealand politician) (1844–1909), New Zealand politician, represented Waikouaiti electorate 1884 to 1887
- Jonny Buckland (born 1977), English-born Welsh guitarist for Coldplay
