= Bisdee =

Bisdee is a surname. Notable people with the surname include:

- John Bisdee (1869–1930), Australian Victoria Cross recipient
- Louis Bisdee (1910–2010), Australian politician
- Thomas Bisdee (born 1984), birth name of Kissy Sell Out
