= HMS Assistance (1850) =

1835 survey barque

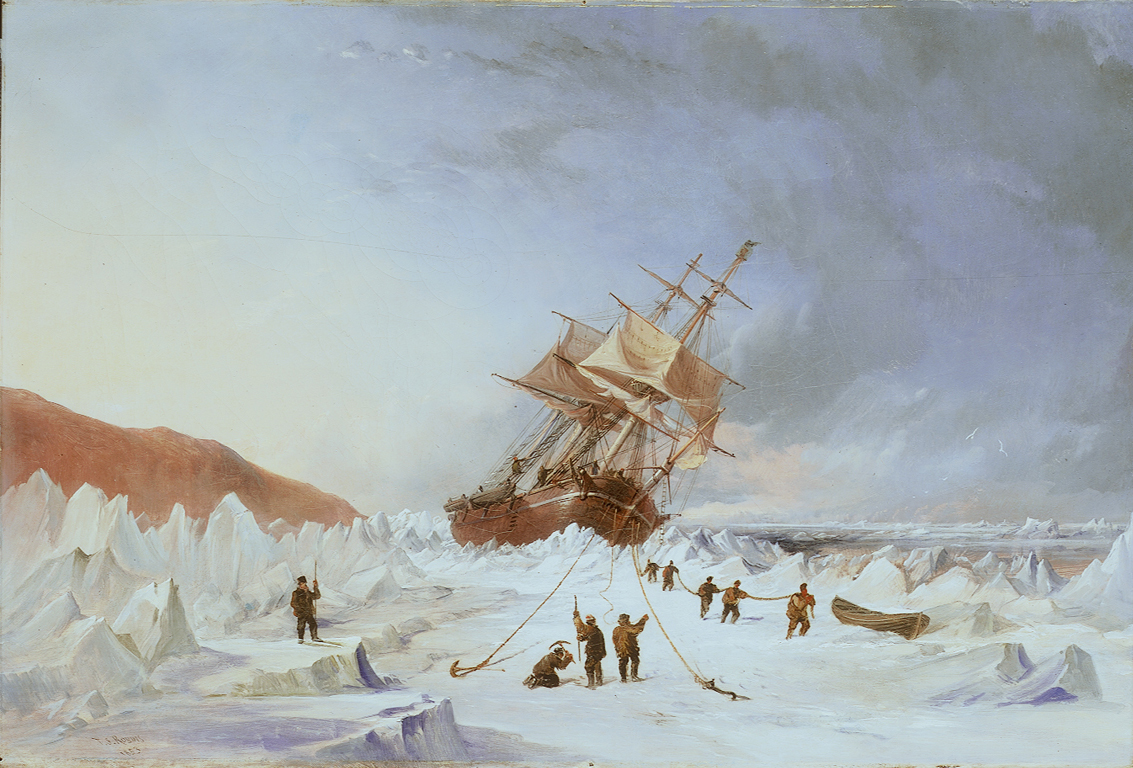
- HMS Assistance in the Ice, by Thomas Sewell Robins, 1853

History

United Kingdom
- Name: Acorn
- Namesake: Acorn
- Owner: T. Kincaid (1840–1850)
- Builder: J. Thomas, Howrah, Calcutta
- Launched: 1834 or 1835
- Renamed: Baboo
- Fate: Sold to the Royal Navy in 1850

United Kingdom
- Name: HMS Assistance
- Acquired: March 1850
- Fate: Abandoned in the ice on 25 August 1854

General characteristics
- Type: Teak-built barque
- Tons burthen: 423 or 420 (bm)
- Length: Overall: 117 ft 4 in (35.8 m); Keel: 115 ft 7 in (35.2 m)
- Beam: 28 ft 5 in (8.7 m)
- Depth of hold: 13 ft 7 in (4.14 m)
- Propulsion: Sails
- Sail plan: Barque rigged
- Complement: 58
- Armament: Two guns
- Notes: Teak-built

HMS Assistance was an Arctic discovery barque of the Royal Navy, and the sixth vessel to carry the name. She began in 1834 as the India-built merchant vessel Acorn. Her name was changed to Baboo. Under that name she transported contract labourers between Mauritius and India, and immigrants to South Australia. The Royal Navy purchased her in 1850 and named her HMS Assistance. Assistance participated in two Arctic expeditions in the search for the lost Franklin expedition before her crew abandoned her in the ice in 1854.

== Career ==
=== Merchant navy ===
Assistance was built out of teak in 1835, at Howrah, Calcutta, and was launched as the merchant vessel Acorn. She was renamed Baboo at some point prior to 1837.

On 23 August 1837, Baboo carried 106 male and six female contract labourers from Calcutta to Mauritius. (Note: The term at the time for contract labourers brought to the British colonies from India, or China, was coolies.) She also made one voyage repatriating contract labourers from Mauritius to India. She had embarked 240 contract labourers, of whom six men died on the way to Madras, and eleven between Madras and Calcutta.

Baboo first appeared in Lloyd's Register in 1839 with Forrester, master, T. Kincaid, owner, Greenock, homeport, and trade Liverpool–South Australia.

Baboo made two voyages to South Australia carrying immigrants. The first took her from Liverpool on 23 November 1839, to Port Adelaide, where she arrived on 9 March 1840. Emanuel Underwood, a passenger on board Baboo, brought with him a small vessel in frame, together with her equipment. He assembled her at Port Adelaide and named her Governor Gawler after the colony's governor.

On 14 May 1847, Baboo ran aground and was severely damaged in the River Thames at Limehouse, consequent to an argument as to whether she should be towed by tugs Lion or Newcastle. Baboo was on a voyage from London to Sydney. She was refloated and put back to London. She had her damages repaired that year. Baboo sailed from the Port of London, departing on 27 June, to Port Jackson, Sydney, New South Wales, Australia, arriving on 24 October. Her captain was Charles Barker.

On Baboo's second voyage to South Australia, she left Deptford on 23 August 1848 and arrived at Port Adelaide on 4 December.

=== Royal Navy ===
In March 1850, the Royal Navy purchased Baboo from Kincade. Wigrams of Blackwall fitted her for Arctic service at a cost of £8,520.

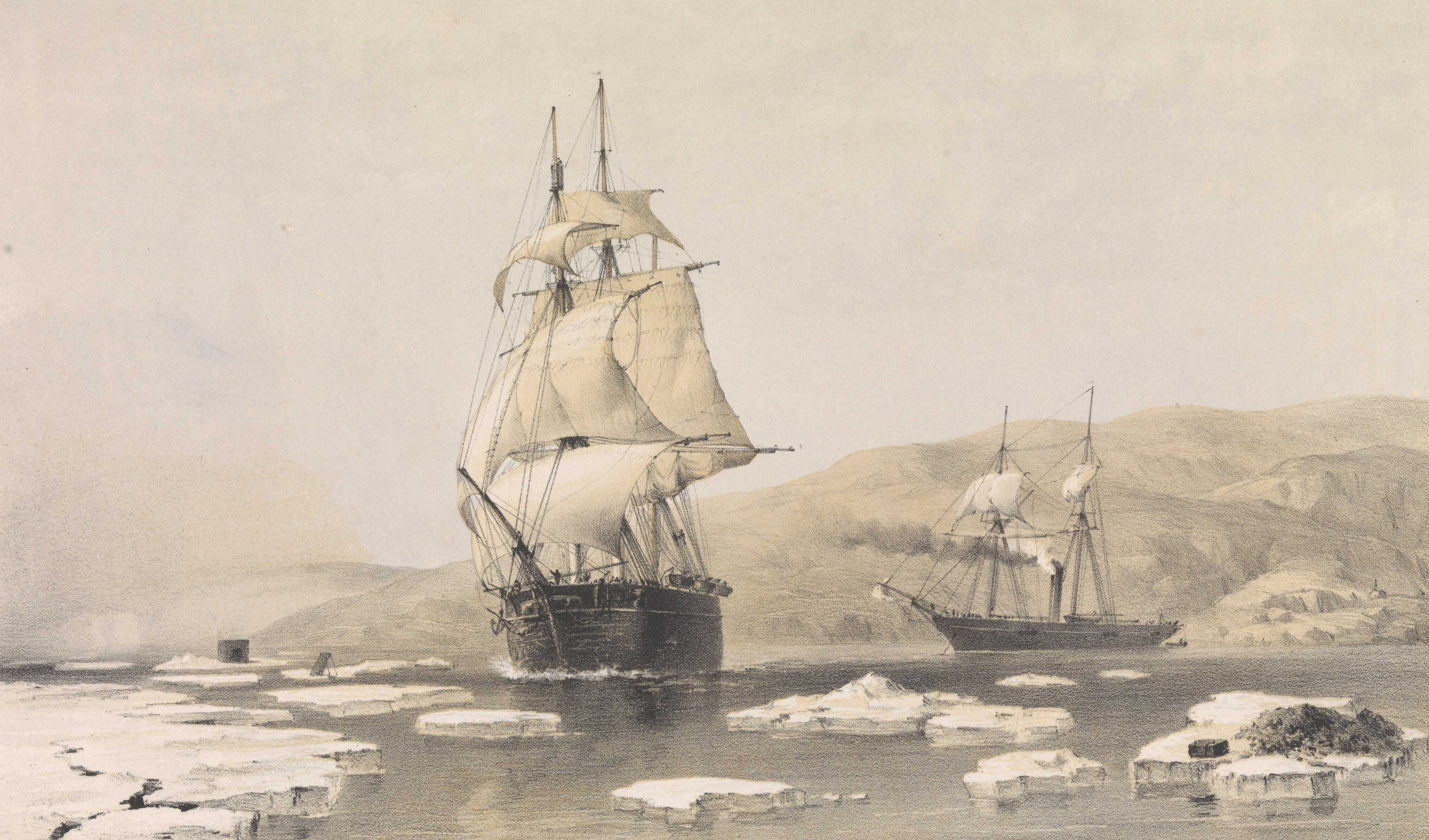
Assistance and Pioneer breaking out of winter quarters, 1854

She joined Horatio Thomas Austin's 1850 attempt to find Sir John Franklin's ill-fated Northwest Passage expedition. Austin commanded Resolute, while Captain Erasmus Ommanney commanded Assistance. In mid 1850, Assistance anchored at Cape York in western Greenland and took on an Inuk guide by the name of Qalaherriaq.

Despite extensive search, the expedition failed to find conclusive evidence of the fate of Franklin and his men and returned to Britain in 1851. They took their Inuk guide with them, and he settled in England where he took the name Erasmus Augustine Kallihirua.

The Navy retained Assistance for future Arctic service, and in 1852 she sailed with Edward Belcher's expedition, part of a squadron of five ships to again attempt to find Franklin's expedition. They had no luck with Franklin's expedition but did rescue HMS Investigator which had been trapped for the last two years in George and James Bay. Assistance became trapped in ice off Bathurst Island with her steam tender, HMS Pioneer, and she and three of the other ships of Belcher's expedition including HMS Resolute were eventually abandoned on 25 August 1854. The crews and rescued survivors then walked and sledged hundreds of miles east to HMS North Star at Beechey Island, the one ship of the squadron which was not trapped and could start ferrying them back to England. By standard practice, Captain Belcher was later court-martialed for losing his ship.
