= John Richard Buckland =

John Richard Buckland (3 August 1819 – 13 October 1874), was an Australian school teacher and first headmaster of The Hutchins School, Tasmania. Married in 1841, he and his wife had set sail a year later for New Zealand, intending to settle on the land. After disembarking at Hobart Town in February 1843 in order to visit his old school friend, Reverend J P Gell, then Headmaster of the Queen’s School, he was persuaded to accept the post of second master there. On the closure of the Queen’s School Buckland opened his own school in Fitzroy Crescent, before taking holy orders and being appointed in 1845 to the parish of St Luke’s, Richmond. He was ordained a priest in March 1846 and his appointment to Hutchins followed soon after.

In commending to your especial charge the important duties of the first Head Master of the Hutchins School, I feel confident that you will justify my choice, by maintaining, in the chief city of my Diocese, that high expectation for sound and Christian learning, which an institution ought to possess, founded, as this has been, by the affectionate piety of the church, in memory of that excellent man who preceded me, the Venerable Archdeacon Hutchins.

Bishop Nixon, 29 June 1846 In his 28 years as Headmaster, Buckland laid a firm foundation for the ongoing success of Hutchins. Under his leadership the pattern of an English public school was extended to include commercial and other practical subjects, as well as the introduction of evening classes. A founding member of the Tasmanian Council of Education from 1859, Buckland contributed to education in the wider sphere by maintaining high standards through a system of examinations in which boys competed for a Tasmanian scholarship and the degree of associate of arts.

Described as a stern disciplinarian, Buckland had a strong sense of justice and earned the respect and affection of his charges — demonstrated by the presentation of a silver cup and 100 guineas following his first illness in 1854, the collection of a further £100 on his illness and enforced rest 20 years later, and by the overwhelming public response to his death from heart disease in 1874.

No man was more universally beloved by those who had the privilege of having him for a master, when they had arrived at that time of life when the mere discipline of the school was forgotten and only its enduring benefits reflected upon and experienced. No more congenial or delightful companion could be met with than the Rev. John Richard Buckland, whose loss, at a comparatively early period of life, will be felt by the parents and the rising generation of the youths of the colony…

Mr. Buckland’s duties were of a most arduous nature, but they were always performed with a degree of earnestness and self-consciousness which is almost inseparable from the true scholar…the vast benefits which his untiring and masterly efforts in the cause of education have diffused throughout the colony, will render his loss the more deplorable.

The Mercury Supplement, 30 November 1874 and The Mercury, 14 October 1874 Following his death at 9.00am, 13 October 1874, the public was notified of the ‘melancholy incident’ by the lowering of flags of the ships in the harbour. Fate tied up the loose ends neatly. After a plain and simple funeral service at All Saints’ Church, Buckland was buried in Queenborough Cemetery, the future home of the School he had served with such distinction. His headstone now resides outside the Chapel of St Thomas — a reminder of his dedicated and distinguished service in the role of founding Headmaster. Buckland was the son of the Rev. John Buckland, Rector of Templeton, Devonshire, and a nephew of Dr. William Buckland, Dean of Westminster. He received his early education from his father at Laleham, and was then sent to Rugby School, of which school his uncle, Dr. Arnold, was at the time head master. At the age of seventeen he went to the University of Oxford, where he held a studentship at Christ Church.

After taking his degree Buckland determined to emigrate to the colonies, and sailed for New Zealand, but in consequence of the unsettled state of affairs in that colony he removed to Tasmania, arriving in Hobart in February 1843. He was for a time second master of the Queen's School, of which the Rev. John Philip Gell was head master. On the closing of that school he opened a private school. In 1845 he was ordained. In 1846 the prospectus of a Church of England Grammar School was issued, and on 3 August in that year the school, named "The Hutchins School" in memory of Archdeacon William Hutchins, was opened at Hobart, with Buckland as head master. It soon became one of the leading schools of the colony, a position which it has ever since maintained, a large number of the most prominent men of Tasmania having received their education at the Hutchins School. Buckland held the post of headmaster for twenty-eight years, until his death, which took place at Hobart on 13 October 1874.
