= St Augustine's College (Kent) =

Coordinates: 51°16′44″N 1°5′14″E

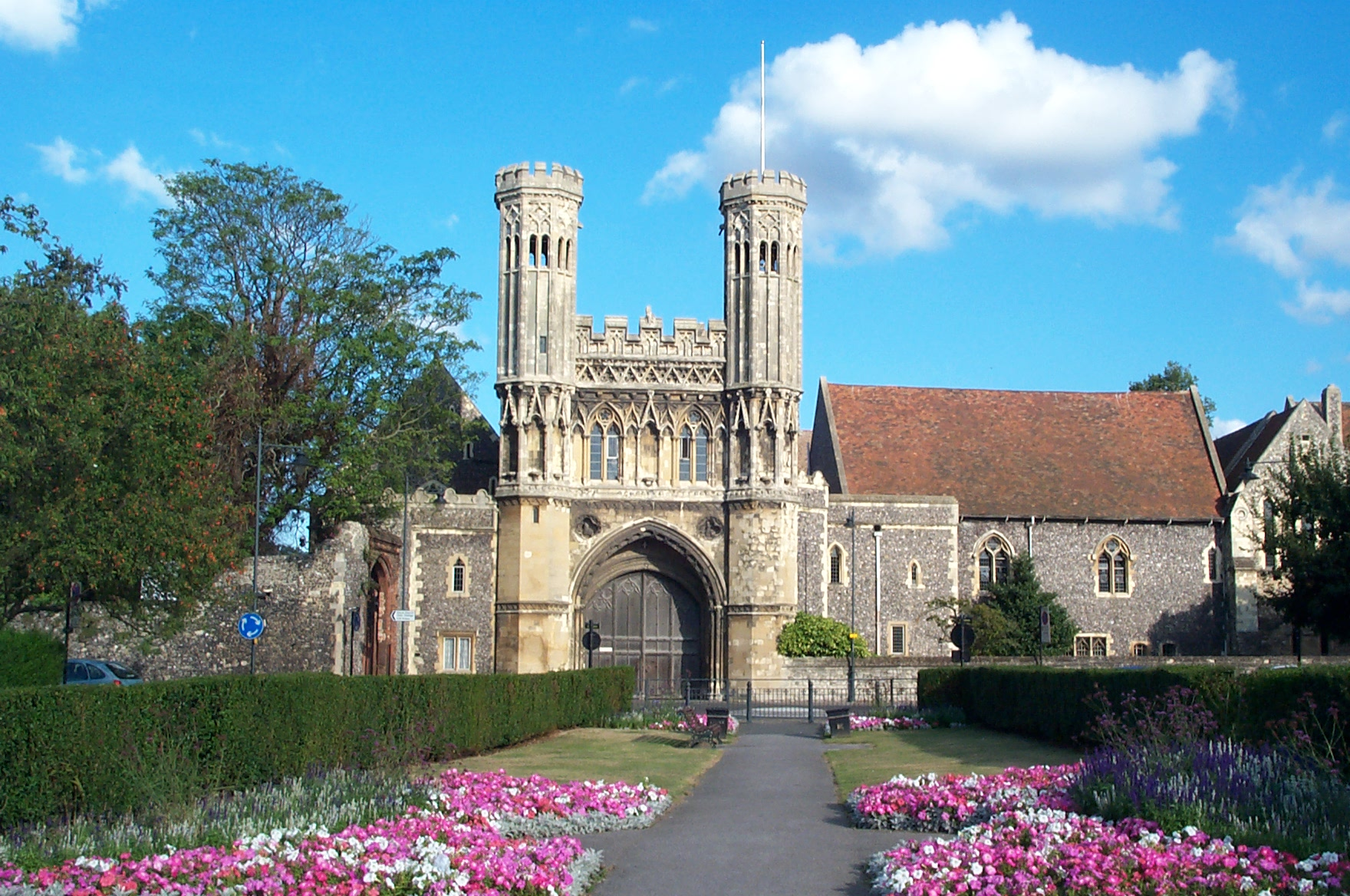
Abbot Fyndon's Great Gate, previously used by the Abbey and both Colleges, is now a private entrance into the King’s School. The public entrance to the abbey ruins is on Longport.

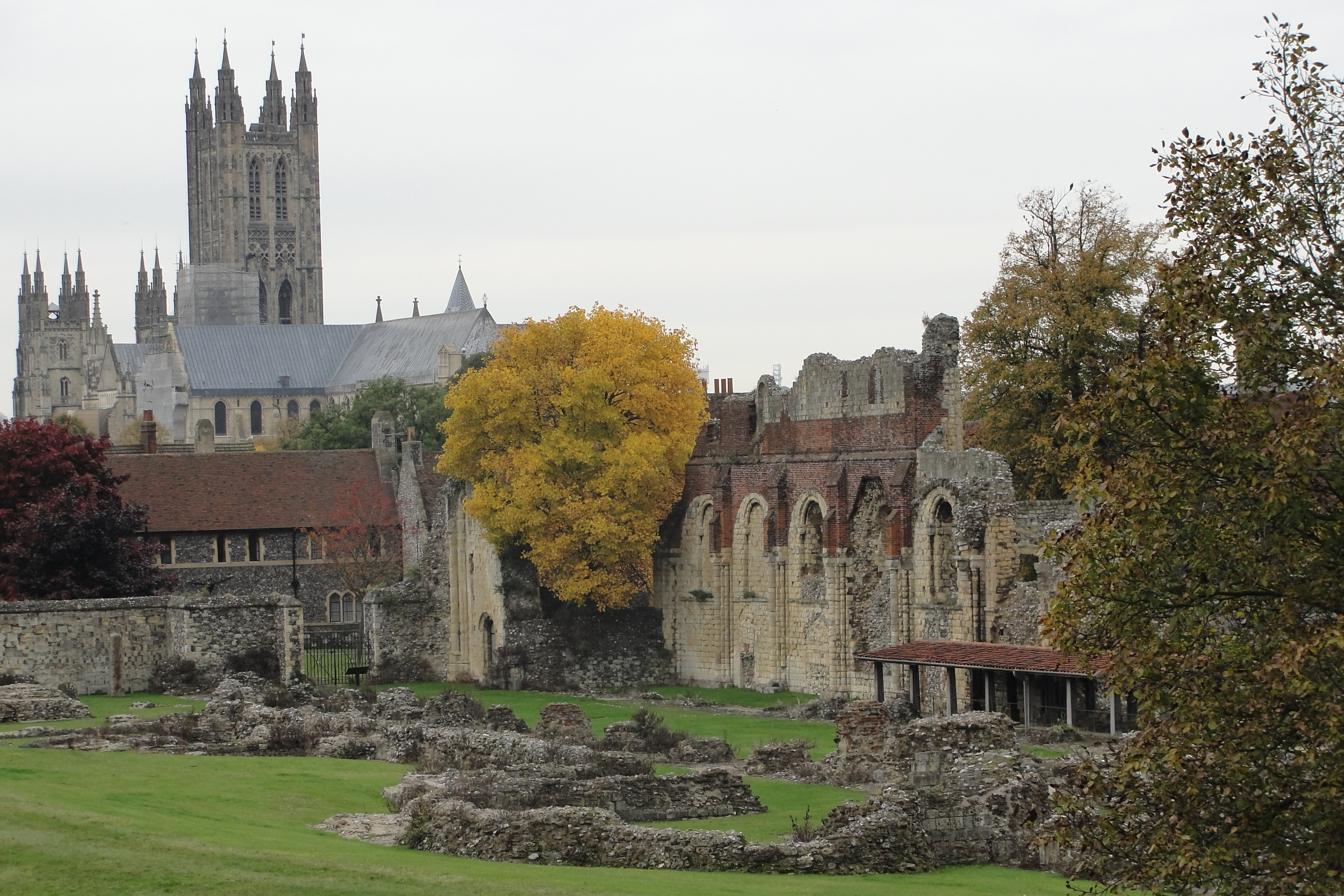
Ruins of St Augustine’s Abbey with a college building in the mid-background and Canterbury Cathedral in the far-background

St Augustine’s College in Canterbury, Kent, United Kingdom, was located within the precincts of St Augustine's Abbey about 0.2 miles (335 metres) ESE of Canterbury Cathedral. It served first as a missionary college of the Church of England (1848–1947) and later as the Central College of the Anglican Communion (1952–1967).

== Missionary college ==
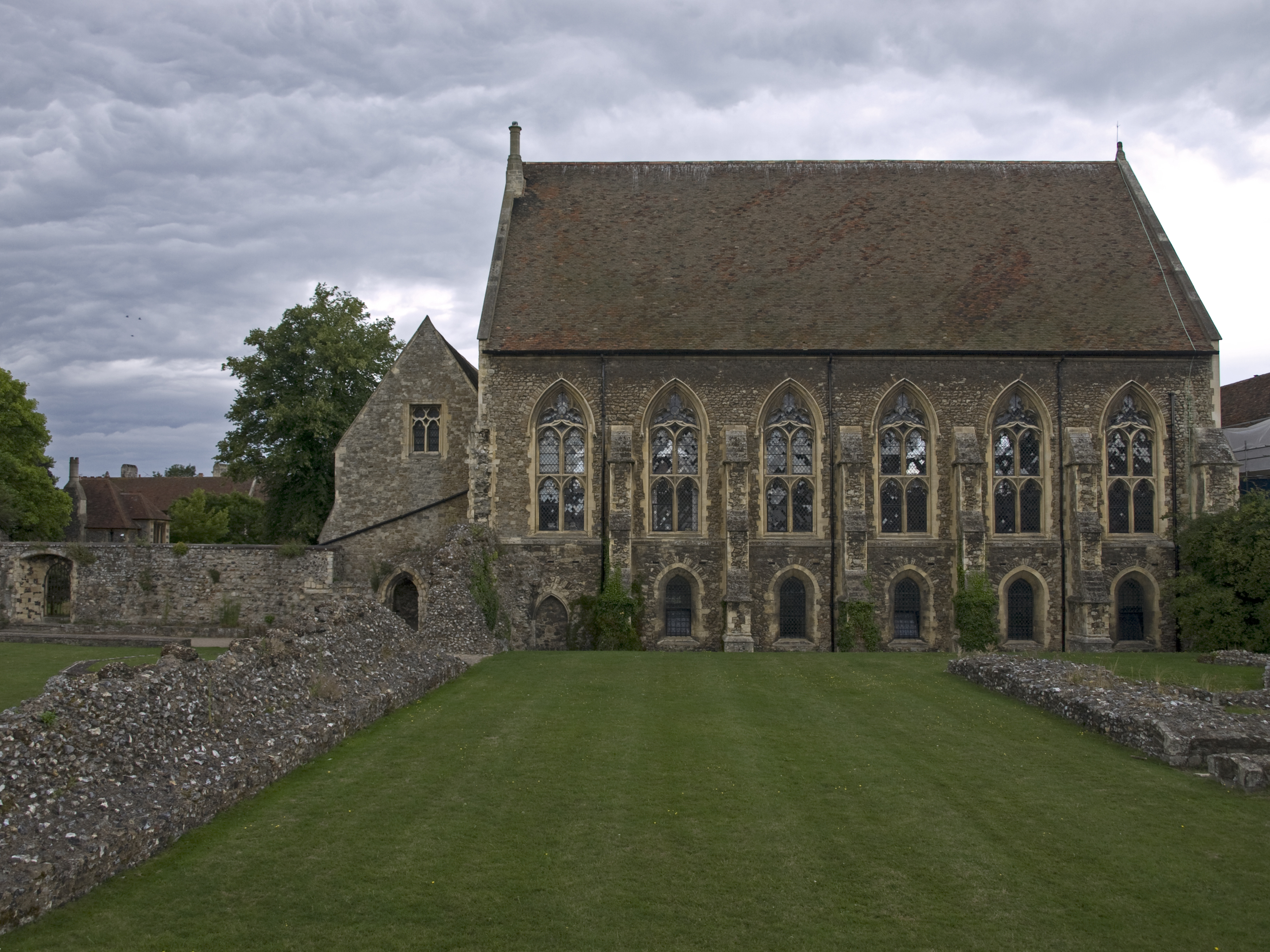
The former chapel

The mid-19th century witnessed a "mass-migration" from England to its colonies. In response, the Church of England sent clergy, but the demand for them to serve overseas exceeded supply. Colonial bishoprics were established, but the bishops were without clergy. The training of missionary clergy for the colonies was “notoriously difficult” because they were required to have not only “piety and desire”, they were required to have an education “equivalent to that of a university degree”. The founding of the missionary college of St Augustine’s provided a solution to this problem.

The Revd Edward Coleridge, a teacher at Eton College, envisioned establishing a college for the purpose of training clergy for service in the colonies: both as ministers for the colonists and as missionaries to the native populations.

Coleridge’s vision was supported by the “high church Anglican network”, but it aroused opposition in low church circles as too much like a Roman Catholic seminary. Coupling the establishment of the college with the restoration of the ruins of St Augustine's Abbey in Canterbury attracted sufficient support for the college to be established.

The abbey had "reached its lowest point of degradation". The gate was the entrance to a brewery, the kitchen was a public house, the grounds were used for dancing and fireworks. This condition was the culmination of the abbey's dismantling and sale of material that began in 1541 after its closure by the Dissolution of the Monasteries during the English Reformation.

Appalled by the abbey's condition, Alexander Beresford Hope MP (a devoted and wealthy layman) purchased the abbey’s ruins and ground plot in 1844. Inspired by Edward Coleridge's vision of a missionary college, the work of establishing the college soon commenced. Funds were raised with Hope as the principal donor along with many other contributors including Queen Victoria. "New buildings arose, a new life seemed to come out of the old shadows that lay so long over and around the ruins." Hope was determined to restore the ancient appearance as much as possible and, in accordance with Hope’s desires, “pains were taken to preserve as much as possible of the old work that seemed worth preserving.” The Great Gate was refurbished and the college library was built over the foundation of what had been the abbey’s refectory. Beneath the library, the remains of an abbey crypt were restored and used for teaching carpentry and other handicrafts needed when the missionary graduates ventured into primitive conditions. The dormitories comprised a range of new buildings designed to blend in with the old. The architect for the reconstruction was William Butterfield.

The new Missionary College was consecrated on 29 June 1848. Some 1,200 people came to Canterbury for the occasion. The Archbishop of Canterbury and his party travelled from London on a special train. By 1849, the college was advertising for students. Over time, hundreds of young men, mostly from humble homes, enrolled and attained high standards of education. Besides religious courses, students were taught practical medicine, Oriental languages, and handicrafts.

=== Activities and graduates ===
People’s Magazine (1 June 1870) described the college's daily activities as summarized in the table below.

Graduates of the college went to “remote, isolated, dangerous, and impoverished parts” of the British Empire. They faced shipwreck, wars, tempests, wild animals and fire. Their destinations and distinctions achieved are shown in the following table.

TIME	ACTIVITY	▌	DESTINATION	NUMBER	▌	DISTINCTION	NUMBER
6:00am	Wake up	▌	Africa and Middle East	76	▌	Bishop	5
7:00am	Chapel, followed by study	▌	Asia and India	126	▌	Dean	3
8:00am	Breakfast for students and faculty, followed by study	▌	Australia, New Zealand and Pacific	98	▌	Archdeacons	20 plus
9:00am	Lectures begin	▌	Canada and Newfoundland	147	▌	Martyrs	1
2:00pm	Lunch followed by recreation	▌	West Indies and Central and South America	23	▌	College principals	2
6:00pm	Tea followed by study time	▌	England and Gibraltar	10	▌	Decorated military chaplains	6
9:30pm	Chapel	▌	Zululand	4	▌	✙	✙
10:30pm	Lights out	▌	Not assigned or not listed	27	▌	✙	✙
✙	✙	▌	Total	511	▌	✙	

=== Global Majority Students ===
St Augustine's College admitted men of "any nation and rank in life". They included a noticeable number of students from around the world. Boggis discusses Erasmus Augustine Kallihirua and Cecil Majaliwa amongst others. Other Global Majority students from the early period include Shapurji Edalji. Photographic portraits of some of these students (together with photographs of some white students and additional information) have been published on the St Augustine's Foundation website.

=== Closure ===
On the night of 31 May 1942, a German air-raid so badly damaged the college that it could no longer operate and the few remaining students moved away. The air-raid spread shards of glass across the campus. Canon W. F. France, the last warden of the Missionary College, spent his days picking up the glass shards. France knew that if the shards were ground in, the soil would be forever contaminated by them.

Fyndon's Great Gate entrance to the college exemplified the devastating damage: it along with buildings inside and outside the college had to be rebuilt.

One factor in the college’s permanent closure was the extensive and costly repairs that would be required to make the buildings again usable. Another factor that led to closing the college as a school for missionaries was that an Archbishops' Commission recommended the closing of separate missionary colleges. Thus, St Augustine's College never reopened as a missionary college. During its century of operation the college sent around 800 men to many parts of the world.

== Central College ==
Closing the Missionary College in 1947 left its buildings free for other uses. The next year, the 1948 Lambeth Conference of the Anglican Communion adopted the following resolution for a new use. "In the opinion of this Conference the establishment of a central college for the Anglican Communion is highly desirable and steps should immediately be taken to establish this college, if possible at St Augustine's College, Canterbury."

The wartime damage that contributed to closing the Missionary College created the possibility for a Central College on the site. However, the damage necessitated extensive reconstruction and modernization. This done, St Augustine's College was reopened in 1952 as the Central College of the Anglican Communion with accommodation for up to 50 students.

=== Purposes ===
While the Missionary College had sent clergy from England to other parts of the world, the new Central College brought clergy to England from around the world. This bringing together of priests from across the worldwide Anglican Communion served two primary purposes. One was further study and research. The other was bonding the Anglican Communion more closely together by common worship and by knowing and learning from each other. The worship included every student's liturgy, often in their native languages.

The student body was composed of about forty priests nominated by their bishops. They came from the United States, Nigeria, the West Indies, Canada, Australia, New Zealand, Africa, India, Pakistan, Japan and other parts of the Anglican Communion. Earning a diploma required at least two eight week terms in residence: at least three terms were encouraged. A diploma was also contingent on satisfactory academic work coupled with participation in the common life and faithfulness in worship.

The faculty was composed of scholars from various provinces of the Anglican Communion, including Japan, the Sudan, China, Canada, the United States and the United Kingdom. The first warden was the Revd Kenneth Sansbury, who served until 1961. The second warden was the Revd Kenneth Cragg who served until the college closed in 1967.

The 1958 Lambeth Conference's Resolution 95: Ministries and Manpower – St. Augustine's College, Canterbury said that "the Conference expresses its satisfaction at the establishment of progress of St Augustine's College, Canterbury, as a central college for the Anglican Communion. It approves of the way in which its work is developing and would encourage its continuance on the present line." In spite of this verbal support, before the next Lambeth Conference, the Central College closed because of lack of support from the provinces of the Anglican Communion. Resources for the college were "always precarious". For most of its operating costs, it had to compete with other causes for voluntary contributions from the various provinces of the Anglican Communion. By the mid-1960s, the college's finances were strained and contributions were decreasing. Lack of funds "effectively constituted the demise of the college". After the Central College closed in 1967, the first warden, by then the Bishop Sansbury, laid the basic reason for its closure on "a failure of some in positions of ultimate authority to keep fresh the vision of what the Central College was intended to be, and what in great measure it succeeded in being."

== King's College, London ==
From 1969 to 1976, St Augustine's was used by King's College, London, for a fourth year of pastoral theological training for its ordinands. The Revd Anthony E. Harvey was the Warden and the Revd Kenneth S. Mason was the sub-warden.

== King's School ==
The King's School, Canterbury, has used the St Augustine's College site (excluding the abbey ruins) since 1976. The portion of the site used by the school was by lease until its purchase in 1994. Buildings used by the Missionary College and the Central College were renovated and new ones built for a total of five boarding houses, as well as the school library.

The ruins of the abbey are now a UNESCO World Heritage Site in the care of English Heritage.

== Selected faculty and alumni of the Missionary College ==
=== Wardens ===
- Right. Rev William Hart Coleridge - 1848–1849
- Rev. Canon Henry Bailey D.D. – 1850–1878
- George Frederick Maclear, 1880–1902
- Basil Coleby Roberts, 1941–1945

=== Lecturers ===
- Vivian H. H. Green
- Philip Arthur Micklem
- Edward William Williamson

=== Council members ===
- Joshua Watson – member of council on foundation

=== Alumni ===
- George Appleton (1902–1993), Archdeacon of London (1962–1963) and Fourth Archbishop of Perth, Australia (1963–1969)
- Nelson Wellesley Fogarty
- William Godfrey
- Laurie Green
- Graeme Knowles
- Bransby Lewis Key
- Alfred Mason, Archdeacon of Hobart (1888–1895)
- Keith Newton
- Stephen Oliver
- William Cyprian Pinkham
- Philipose Mar Chrysostom
- Colin Slee
- Gilbert Price Lloyd Turner
- James Carter 1828–1909, student 1852–1853
- Charles Marsden Betts, 1833–1857
- Hutcheson Exhibitioner, student 1853–1855
- Canon Arthur Margoschis, student 1875, who later become a notable SPG missionary to India

== Selected staff members of the Central College ==
=== Wardens ===
- Cyril Kenneth Sansbury – 1952–1961
- Kenneth Cragg – 1961–1967
- Alden D. Kelly, Sub-warden 1956–?

=== Fellows ===
- George Francis Selby Gray, formerly a professor at Huachung University, Wuchang, China 1952–?
- Edward Charles Chandler, Order of the Nile, formerly Traffic Manager, Sudan Railways
- Richard Fredrick Hettlinger – 1953–59, formerly a professor at Wycliffe College, Toronto, Canada
- Howard A. Johnson, Canon Theologian, Cathedral of St John the Divine, New York City, New York, United States – 1953–54
- Reuel L. Howe, Virginia Theological Seminary, Alexandria, Virginia, United States – 1954
- Charles W. F. Smith, Episcopal Theological School, Cambridge, United States – 1955
- William Enkichi Kan, Dean of Divinity, St Paul’s University, Tokyo, Japan – 1955–56
- George Noel Lankester Hall – 1957–1960
- Leonard M. Schiff – 1962
- William H. Ralston Jr. – 1960–62

=== Visiting lecturers ===
- A. O. Standen
- B. J. Wigan
