= The Hutchins School =

School in Hobart, Tasmania, Australia

Location
- Sandy Bay, Hobart, Tasmania; Australia; 42°54′21″S 147°19′46″E

Information
- Type: Independent, day & boarding
- Motto: Latin: Vivit Post Funera Virtus, What You Do Matters (Character lives after death)
- Denomination: Anglican
- Established: 1846; 180 years ago
- Founder: The Church of England, in memory of The Ven. Archdeacon William Hutchins
- Sister school: St Michael's Collegiate School
- Chairman: Mr Michael Cooper
- Principal: Dr Robert McEwan
- Chaplain: Reverend Mark Holland
- Employees: ~250
- Years offered: Pre-Kindergarten - Year 12
- Gender: Boys
- Enrolment: 1,100
- Campuses: Junior School (Pre-Kinder - Year 5); Middle School (Years 6-8); Senior School (Years 9-12)
- Colours: Black, Gold & Magenta
- Athletics conference: SATIS
- Mascot: Rory the Lion
- Affiliation: International Boys' School Coalition (IBSC); Association of Independent Schools Tasmania (IST); Association of Heads of Independent Schools of Australia; Round Square; Sports Association of Tasmanian Independent Schools (SATIS)
- Website: www.hutchins.tas.edu.au

The Hutchins School, colloquially known as Hutchins, is an Anglican, day and boarding school for boys from pre-kindergarten to Year 12 in Hobart, Tasmania. Established in 1846, Hutchins is one of the oldest continuously operating schools in Australia.

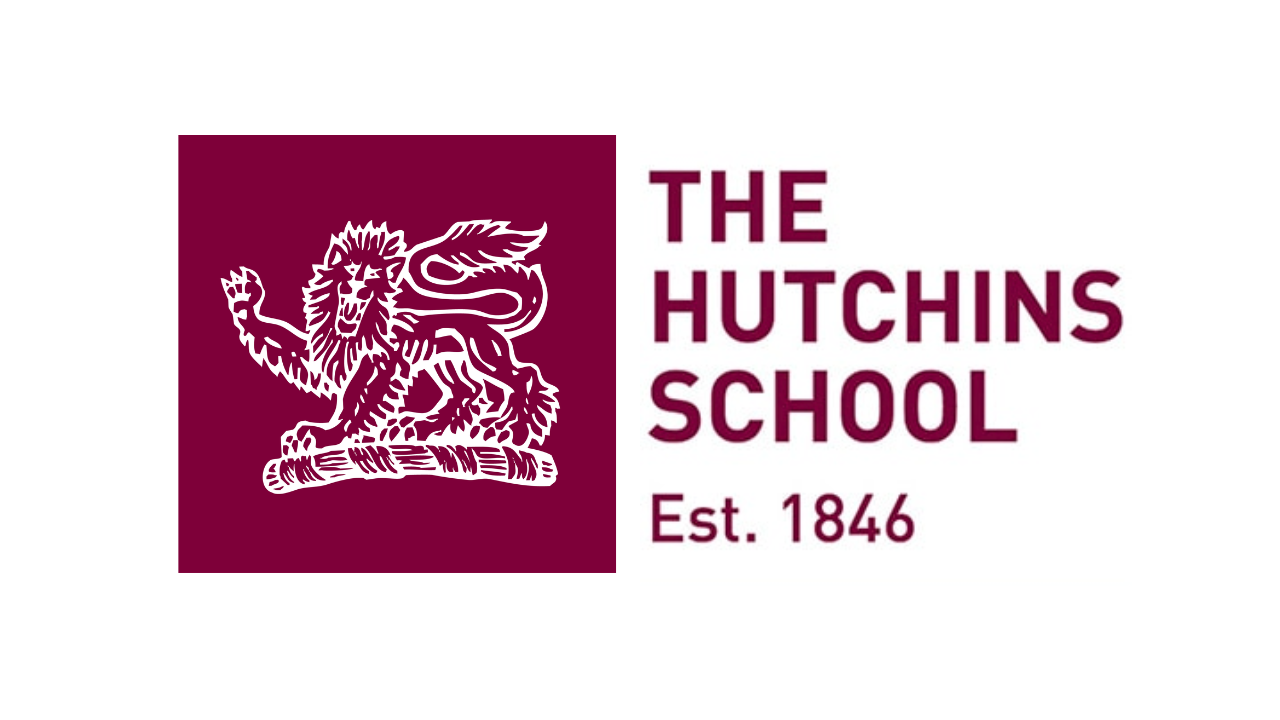
THS Alternative Logo

Hutchins is a founding-member of the International Boys' Schools Coalition (IBSC), and a member of Independent Schools Tasmania (IST). The Hutchins School is also a member of Round Square.

== History ==
The Hutchins School was established in 1846 at Hobart Town in memory of The Venerable William Hutchins, first Archdeacon of Van Diemen's Land. Arriving in the colony in 1837, Archdeacon Hutchins had worked to establish a faithful ministry, erecting churches and schools and laying the foundation for secondary education under the auspices of the Church of England.

The school commenced operations under Headmaster John Richard Buckland at Ingle Hall, a large Georgian house dating back to 1811 which still stands in lower Macquarie Street, Hobart. Three years later it moved several blocks up Macquarie Street to a purpose-built schoolhouse designed by Tasmanian architect, William Archer.

In the early days, Hutchins survived by absorbing pupils, staff, and plant of other institutions, including Christ's College (1846–1912), The High School (1850–65), Horton College (1855–93) and Officer College (1888–1900). When Hutchins joined forces with Christ's College in 1912 it was the signal for Arthur A. Stephens to close Queen's College, founded by him in 1893, and accept the post of vice-master of Hutchins. In 1905 Hutchins amalgamated with Buckland's School, opened in 1893 by William Harvey Buckland, son of founding headmaster J. R. Buckland and brother of second headmaster John Vansittart Buckland. Hutchins would go on to absorb King's Grammar School (1907), Franklin House School (1917) and Apsley House School (1928), and affiliate with Gryce (1934) and Gladwyn (1937) Schools.

By the 1950s the school was growing too large for its inner-city site and in 1957 a new Junior School was built on an elevated site overlooking the River Derwent at Sandy Bay. This followed the opening at the Sandy Bay site of a sub-primary section in 1946 and the War Memorial Oval and DB Memorial Pavilion in 1955. The Senior School was later constructed on the adjacent site of the former Queenborough Cemetery, following a council referendum in which ratepayers voted '1 for educational purposes' in 1960. As part of this arrangement the council committed to pay for 1,900 bodies to be exhumed from the cemetery with the school funding all other exhumations. As of 2024, it is unclear how many bodies were actually exhumed by the council. By 1964 the Senior School campus encompassed a Boarding House (Burbury House), the Foster Science Wing and the Erwin Science Wing, quickly followed by an administration block and classrooms, later followed by the Ray Vincent Humanities Wing, while the Junior School campus across the road soon expanded to include a fledgling Middle School. The Macquarie Street building was sold in 1965, with Hutchins commencing full operations at Sandy Bay the following year. In the following decades, The Hutchins School expanded to include the Palfreyman Gymnasium, the Chapel of St Thomas, the Terence Butler Auditorium,the Middle School Megaquad and the John Bednall Centre for Learning Support (renamed to the John Bednall Centre for Excellence in 2014).

In March 2024, two graves were found during earthworks for a new building at the school, the NJ Edwards Hub. An archaeology team was brought in and 1,973 human remains were exhumed upon completion of the project in late 2024. It is believed to be the largest mass exhumation ever undertaken in Australia. Due to poor management of the former cemetery it was difficult to identify the remains. 1,717 out of 1,973 of the bodies were identified. The remains were reinterred at the Cornelian Bay Cemetery. It is believed that hundreds of bodies remain buried under school property.

== Development Projects ==
The Hutchins School has undertaken a number of campus expansions and redevelopment projects.

- Chris Rae Building - Named in honour of former teacher and Head of Senior School Chris Rae, the wing was constructed as part of the Middle School’s campus expansion to accommodate the inclusion of the Year 6 cohort in 2022. The building provides four classrooms, a multipurpose space, an amphitheatre, offices, and dedicated breakout areas, as well as specialised dance and drama studios.
- NJ Edwards Hub - The NJ Edwards Hub is named in honour of NJ Edwards. The facility is now the central hub of the School, Its main feature is a large auditorium capable of accommodating the entire School for assemblies, performances, and major events, alongside a foyer displaying artworks and memorabilia. The Hub also includes two multi-purpose indoor courts for basketball, volleyball and badminton, a weights and cardio room, and planned Stage 3 additions such as an indoor swimming pool and an underground car park for around 120 vehicles. In addition, it provides meeting rooms and classrooms, and features an underpass linking the Senior and Middle School areas.

== Co-curricular program ==
The school runs an extensive co-curricular program offering music, performing arts, debating, sports, and dance. Students from Years 7-12 choose a sport for Term 1/4 (summer sports) and Term 2/3, to participate in after school. Inter-school debating is available from Year 5 to Year 12, with the Year 5s and 6s in one group and the Year 7s and 8s in another. Debating usually begins around March, and participating students debate every second week, at various schools across Hobart. Music at Hutchins is also another co-curricular choice. with Strings Groups, Bands, Concert Bands, Jazz Bands, Chamber Groups, Ensembles and Choir/Vocal Groups on offer. Private music tutoring is available at an additional cost. Performing Arts are available for all students from Prep, with Dance, being the most popular within Performing Arts. Dance programs include Jazz, Musical Theatre, Lyrical/Contemporary, Hip-Hop, and Tap. The School of Performing Arts welcomes students with interests in Drama, Musical Theatre, and Music Performance. A small number of scholarships may awarded by the Principal to students of exceptional ability.

== House System ==
As with most Australian schools, Hutchins uses a house system. The current house system consists of four houses (Thorold, Stephens, Buckland, and School). Each house has a sister house from St Michael's Collegiate School. Buckland, Dundas and McPhee (Collegiate) are red houses. School, Rivers and Stevens (Collegiate) are blue houses. Thorold, Monty and Reiby (Collegiate) are green houses. Stephens, Kilburn and Mitchell (Collegiate) are brown houses. Each year, these houses compete against each other in physical and mental contests for the 'House Cup'. These events include inter-house debating, house performance, house choir and athletics. There is also a 'House Spirit Cup' that goes to house with the most School Spirit. The School holds multiple house events across the year including Athletics Carnival, Swimming Carnival, Summer Sports Day and Winter Sports Day.

The Hutchins School Houses
House name	Colour	Mascot	Motto
Buckland	Red	Eagle and Waratah	Cura personalis – courage, compassion
School	Blue	Merino Ram	Unitas et praestantia – united and working together as one
Stephens	Yellow	Lion	Virtutis amore – for the love of virtue
Thorold	Green	Stag	Cervus non servus – unenslaved by the herd

== Headmasters/Principals ==
During Toppin’s tenure, the title of the school’s leader was changed from Headmaster to Principal. The title was subsequently restored to Headmaster by his successor Dean. Incumbent Dr Rob McEwan, kept the title of Headmaster until 2023, where McEwan adopted the title Principal.

Headmaster	Term begin	Term end	Notes
John Richard Buckland	3 August 1846	13 October 1874	
J V Buckland	1874	1892	
H H Anderson	1892	1906	
E G Muschamp	1907	1908	
G A Gurney	1908	1912	
L H Lindon	1912	1917	
C C Thorold	1918	1929	
J R O Harris	1929	1942	
V S Murphy	1942	1945	
P Radford	1946	1953	
W H Mason-Cox	1954	1958	
H V Jones	1958	1958	
G H Newman	1959	1963	
D H Lawrence	1963	1970	
D B Clarke	1971	1986	
J M B Bednall	1987	1996	
W D Toppin	1997	2007	Adopted the title of 'Principal'
Warwick Dean	2007	31 December 2016	Readopted the title of 'Headmaster'
Dr Rob McEwan	1 January 2017	incumbent	Readopted the title of 'Principal'

== Notable alumni ==
Notable alumni of The Hutchins School include:

- Errol Flynn, Hollywood actor
- Percy Abbot CMG, a soldier, politician and solicitor
- Stuart Barnes, poet (1981–1995)
- John Bisdee VC, first Australian winner of the Victoria Cross (1882–1885)
- Frank Bowden CBE, FRS, scientist
- Tim Bowden, broadcaster, journalist and author (1946–54)
- Sir Stanley Burbury KCMG KCVO KBE, Governor of Tasmania (1973–1982)
- Bob Clifford, founder of Incat, shipbuilder and entrepreneur (1961)
- Sir John Davies KCMG, politician, newspaper proprietor and first-class cricketer
- Lyndhurst Giblin DSO, MC, economist
- Stephen Gumley, engineer and first CEO, Australian Defence Materiel Organisation (1966–74)
- Richard Hewson, master mariner and navigator, winner of 2011–12 Volvo Ocean Race (1992–97)
- Mitchell Hibberd, AFL Footballer
- Michael Hodgman, Liberal MHR (1947–56)
- Roger Hodgman, theatre and television director
- Will Hodgman, Liberal Premier (1980–86)
- Kevin Hofbauer, actor (2006)
- Paul Hudson, AFL footballer and coach (1988)
- Leonard Huxley KBE, physicist and former President of the Australian Institute of Physics
- Alfred Mason, Anglican Archdeacon of Hobart (1888–1895)
- Thomas Murdoch CMG, politician
- Brodie Neill, designer (1983–96)
- Harold Nicholas, Chief Justice of the Supreme Court, judge and politician
- Hamish Peacock, javelin olympian (2008)
- Sir James Ramsay KCMG, KCVO, CBE, DSC, Governor of Queensland (1977–1985)
- Arthur Smithies, Harvard economist
- John Stopp, President of the Legislative Council of Tasmania (1992–1995)
- Damon Thomas, Alderman and former Lord Mayor of Hobart, Tasmanian Crown Solicitor, State Ombudsman, CEO of the Tasmanian Chamber of Commerce and Industry and Korean Consul (1967)
- James William Tibbs CMG, Headmaster of Auckland Grammar School, 1893–1922 (1867–72)
- Alan Walker, architect
- Owen Walsh, Administrator of Norfolk Island (2008–2012)
- Troy Pickard, politician and businessman
- Denis Warner OBE, CMG, war correspondent, author and journalist (1928–35)
- Guy Wylly VC DSO, joint first Australian winner of the Victoria Cross (1889–1893)

== Rhodes Scholars & Victoria Cross Recipients ==
As of 2024, The Hutchins School has had 26 Rhodes Scholars, the latest being the 2024 Tasmania scholar, Billy Blackett. Alumni have been awarded the Rhodes Scholarship for Australian states other than Tasmania, such as the 2016 New South Wales scholar, Harjeevan Narulla.

Notable Hutchins alumni to be awarded the Rhodes Scholarship include:

- 1923 – Leonard Huxley
- 1979 – Stephen Gumley

Two Hutchins Old Boys have been awarded the Victoria Cross, the highest military decoration for valour in Commonwealth countries. They include:

- Major Guy George Egerton Wylly VC DSO (1st Tasmanian Imperial Bushmen; Boer War; 1900)
- Trooper John Hutton Bisdee VC OBE (1st Tasmanian Imperial Bushmen, Boer War; 1900)

== See also ==
- List of schools in Tasmania
- List of boarding schools
- Education in Tasmania
- International Boys' Schools Coalition
