= Thomas Sewell Robins =

British maritime painter (1810–1880)

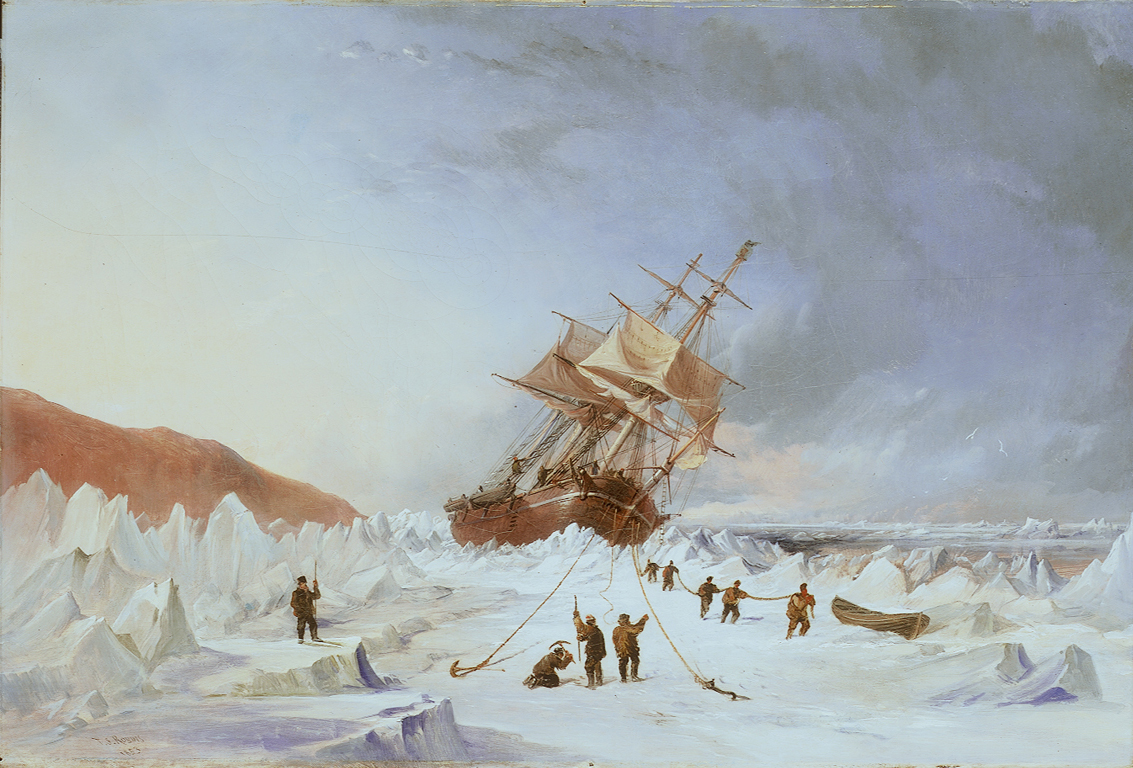
HMS Assistance in the Ice, by Thomas Sewell Robins, 1853

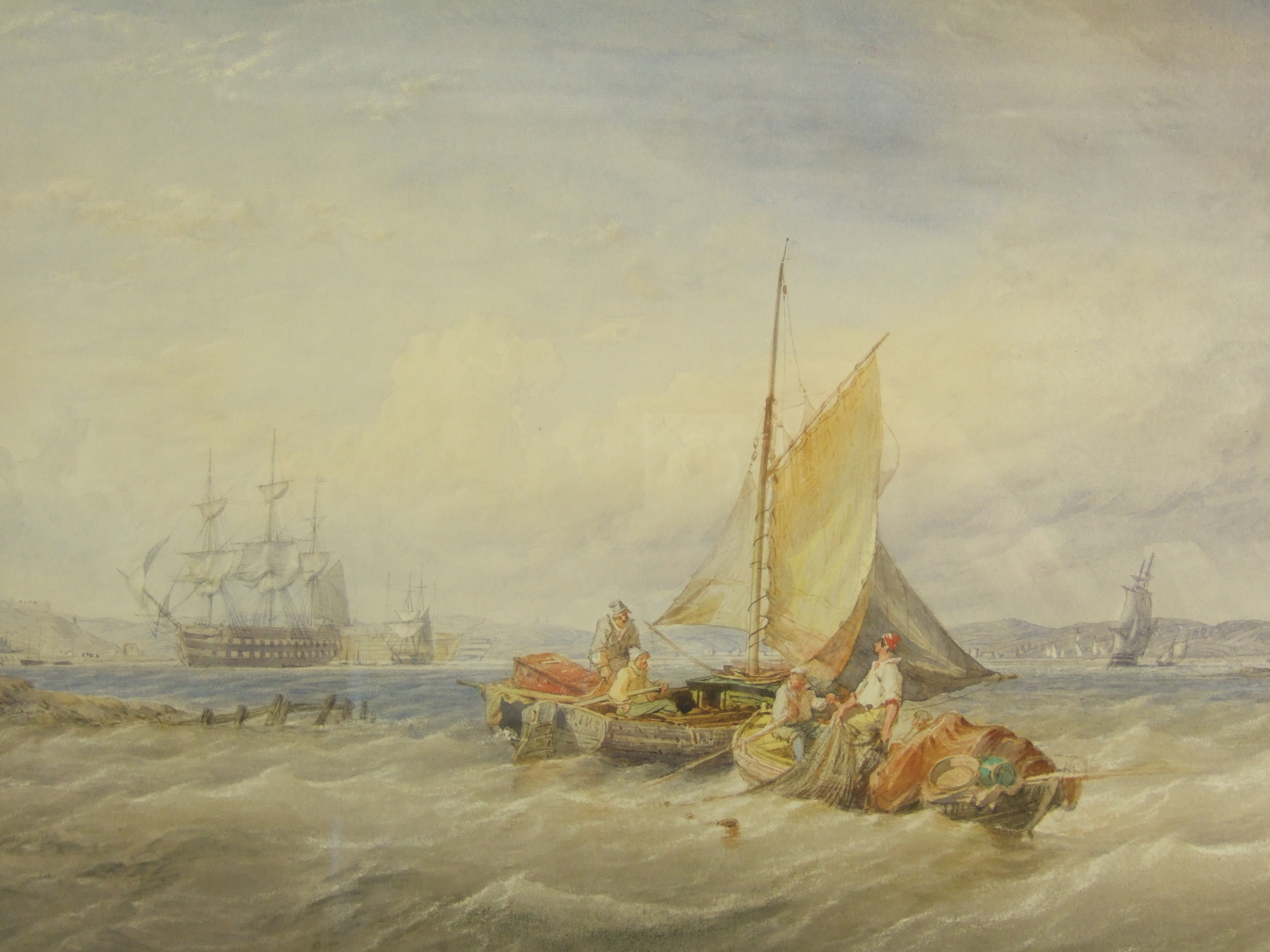
Watercolour of a Coastal Fishing Scene: Bringing in the Nets by Thomas Sewell Robins, 1861

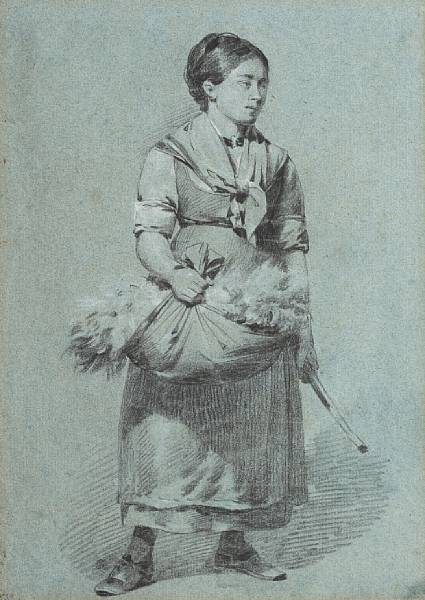
Chalk Drawing of a Girl with Wool Gatherings, by Thomas Sewell Robins

Thomas Sewell Robins (Devonport 8 May 1810 – 9 August 1880) was a British painter who specialised in maritime subjects. Robins studied at the Royal Academy Schools. A prolific painter, he travelled extensively in Europe, and exhibited at the Royal Academy, the British Institute, the Suffolk Street Galleries and the New Watercolour Society. He worked primarily in watercolours and occasionally in oil. Robins also made some pencil drawings and watercolour sketches of people in local dress. His work is in the collection of a number of notable museums and galleries.

== Early life ==
Born on 8 May 1810 in Devonport, Devon, Robins was admitted into the Royal Academy Schools on 22 April 1829 under the sponsorship of fellow Devonian James Northcote, a former pupil of Sir Joshua Reynolds. His professor of painting was Thomas Phillips and his lecturer in perspective was J. M. W. Turner. He was an early member of the New Watercolour Society and the Institute of Painters in Watercolours.

== Career ==
Robins travelled extensively on the Continent, visiting France in 1842, Holland and Italy in 1845, the Mediterranean c. 1850, Holland and the Rhine in 1857, France in 1858, and Antwerp in 1859.

Robins specialized in coastal marine subjects, working primarily in watercolours and on occasion in oils. He did some paintings, particularly some large scale yachting scenes in the Solent some of which were engraved by Dolby, Harris and others. His work is in the collections of the Victoria and Albert Museum, Birmingham Museum and Art Gallery, the British Museum, the City of Portsmouth Museum, Cartwright Hall (Bradford), Howarth Museum and Gallery (Accrington), Newport Art Gallery, the Williamson Art Gallery and Museum (Birkenhead), the National Maritime Museum at Greenwich, and the Muscarelle Museum of Art.

One oil painting of his in the National Maritime Museum dates from 1853 and is of HMS Assistance trapped in the Arctic ice.

A more typical watercolour by Robins is "Bringing in the Nets" initialled TSR and dated 1861. He produced many similar works of varying quality. He seldom added titles except for brief phrases about location e.g. "Off Sheerness"; the titles are mostly assigned by the auction houses.

During his travels, Robins also made some pencil drawings and watercolour sketches of people in local dress. The chalk drawing above right is of a girl with wool gatherings; it is not dated.

== Death ==
Failing health forced him to reduce his commitments in 1865–66. He died in 1880, leaving his wife, Elizabeth and daughter, Delia.
