= Alfred Mason =

Alfred Mason (1837-1895) was an Anglican priest in Australia.

Born in Tasmania, he was the son of police magistrate Thomas Mason, and was educated at The Hutchins School.

Mason was a graduate of St Augustine's College, Canterbury. He was ordained a priest in 1862. He served incumbencies at New Town, Tasmania and Evandale, Tasmania. He was Archdeacon of Hobart from 1888 until his death.
