= Arthur A. Stephens =

Australian educator (1867–1914)

Arthur Augustus Stephens BA (21 March 1867 – 14 May 1914), generally referred to as Arthur A. Stephens, was founder and headmaster of Queen's College, Hobart, which ran from 1893 to 1912, when it was absorbed by Hutchins School.

== History ==
Stephens was the youngest son of William Stephens, and was educated at a Tasmanian state school, from where he received an exhibition which enabled him to attend the High School run by Rev. R. D. Poulett-Harris MA. There, at age 15, he achieved a first-class A.A. degree with honours from the Board of Education, and subsequently won a BA degree by examination from the University of London. He was active in the social life of New Town, was foundation secretary of St John's Club and organising secretary for charitable causes. He played cricket for New Town.

In 1886 Stephens founded the Newtown Classical and Commercial School, (Note: Newtown Classical and Commercial School was conducted in the Templars' Hall, near the Post Office, New Town. Four of the six successful candidates at the law examinations in 1889 were Stephens' students.) which he ran for three or four years, then for three years was assistant master with the Officer College in Hobart. He left that institution (Note: According to at least one later account Officer College was dissolved, which is unsupportable.) and in 1893 he took over the old Scotch College at the intersection of Elizabeth and Brisbane streets, Hobart, and founded Queen's College, which soon gained a high reputation. In later years a boarding college was established at "Minallo" on Lansdowne Crescent.

By 1912 he was suffering ill-health and accepted a takeover offer from the rapidly-expanding Hutchins School. It is likely the terms included an offer of employment as shortly after, once his health had improved, he was appointed vice-master of the great school. It was not to last long, however, as he died of anaemia less than two years later. His last wish was for old scholars of Queen's College to act as his pall-bearers.

Queen's College, while it lasted, had a fine reputation, and many professional men could look back on their days at the school with pride and gratitude.

== Family ==
On 28 June 1905 Stephens married Ida Ethel Marion Steele; they had two children.
