= Stephen Gumley =

Australian businessman

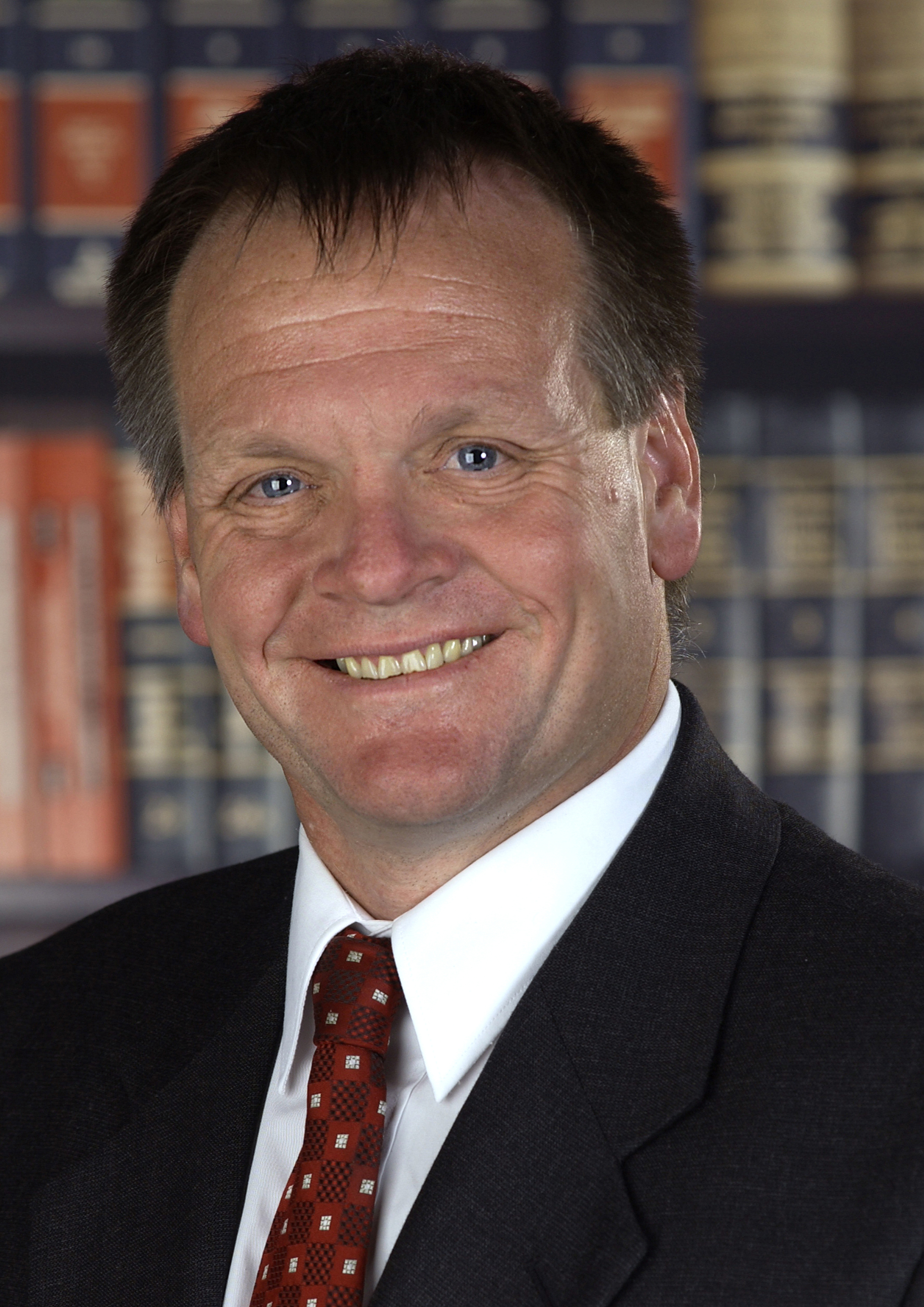
Stephen Gumley

Stephen John Gumley, AO (born 26 October 1956) was the first Chief Executive Officer of the Australian Defence Materiel Organisation, serving in the role from February 2004 to July 2011.

== Education ==
Gumley was educated at The Hutchins School. He obtained a Bachelor of Engineering with First Class Honours from the University of Tasmania in 1978 and was elected as a Rhodes scholar in 1979. He was awarded a Doctor of Philosophy from St Catherine's College, the University of Oxford in 1982 and an MBA from the University of Tasmania in 1994. He is a Fellow of The Institution of Engineers Australia and a Fellow of the Australian Institute of Company Directors.

== Early career ==
Gumley was previously CEO of the Australian Submarine Corporation (2002–2004), Vice President at Boeing in Seattle (1999–2001), CEO of aviation software supplier The Preston Group (1998–1999) and CEO of the entrepreneurial Global Lightning Technologies Group (1993–1997).

== Defence Materiel Organisation ==
=== Appointment ===
In February 2004, Gumley was appointed the inaugural CEO of the Defence Materiel Organisation (DMO). He guided the organisation in its transition to an Australian Government Prescribed Agency on 1 July 2005. In May 2008, Parliamentary Secretary for Defence Procurement, Greg Combet announced an extension to Gumley's tenure, stating that his reappointment reflected a strong belief within the incoming Government that Gumley had been largely responsible for a significant improvement in the handling of Defence projects.

=== Reforms ===
Following his appointment, Gumley immediately implemented six reform themes under the slogan "change is goodness". The six themes were:

- Professionalisation of the DMO workforce,
- Reprioritisation of work,
- Standardisation of business practices,
- Benchmarking against better practice,
- Improving relationships with Defence industry, and
- Leading reform.

=== DMO achievements ===
Under Gumley's leadership DMO successfully provided a range of new and leading-edge equipment for the Australian Defence Force. Significant reforms were also underway to tackle Australia's national skills shortages in the defence sector including an internal program of professionalisation and an ambitious external program entitled Skilling Australia's Defence Industry.

An assessment of a large number of projects in May 2008 by DMO found that the average cost of DMO projects compared to their budget indicated that projects were being delivered at 99.2% of their budgeted cost. The Minister for Defence, Joel Fitzgibbon and The Parliamentary Secretary for Defence Procurement, Greg Combet, acknowledged the improvements Gumley had brought to the organisation.

Later Australian National Audit Office (ANAO) reviews of specific projects and capabilities were qualified in their assessment of the effectiveness of DMO reforms. For instance ANAO report 24 of 2009-10 of March 2010 identified "a range of ongoing issues which detracted from the effective procurement of explosive ordnance for the Australian Defence Force", that "there remains considerable scope for improvement in the management of explosive ordnance", and that it was too early to confirm whether proposed reforms would provide enduring improvement to Defence and the DMO's management of the procurement and sustainment of explosive ordnance.

The findings of ANAO Report 37 of May 2010 into the Lightweight Torpedo Project included that – for that project – "project management and planning was inadequate, and in some instances key project documents were either not developed, or were not developed on a timely basis", and that "the planning of testing and acceptance and the resolution of testing and acceptance issues for Joint Project 2070 by the DMO has been inadequate." This report further stated that "this project demonstrates that, in respect of Defence major capital equipment acquisition projects, it remains the case that further enhancement of these monitoring and reporting mechanisms is required to properly inform decision making by both Defence and Government."

Ministerial statements in 2010 and 2011 suggested that the Government believed new procurement reforms were needed. On 26 November 2010 the Minister for Defence, Stephen Smith (Australian politician) in adding project AIR 5418 Joint Air to Surface Stand-off Missile (JASSM) to the 'Projects of Concern' list, stated that the listing was because of "our poor management, our failure to keep Government properly and fully informed about the project and it's difficulties." Minister Smith also said that he had asked Defence to review the effectiveness of its management of major projects. On 6 May 2011 Minister Smith announced further Defence procurement reforms aimed at improving project management, minimising risk at project start and identifying problems early and on 29 June 2011 Minister Smith announced reforms to the management of 'Projects of Concern' including the development of formal remediation plans for designated projects.

=== Combat clothing ===
Under Gumley's leadership a comprehensive reform of combat clothing for the Australian Defence Force was implemented. Key outcomes of the independent 2007 review included ensuring that deployed Australian troops receive high quality clothing and personal equipment, and the release of a five-year forecast of procurement opportunities in the sector Clothing and Personal Equipment Procurement Plan to provide industry with sufficient guidance to enable broad business planning.

In an interview with The Age newspaper 5 July 2006, precipitating the 2007 review, Gumley admitted endemic problems within the DMO.

The provision of clothing and equipment to Australia's front-line troops has been plagued by "stuff-ups", one of the nation's most senior defence officials has admitted. In an extraordinarily candid briefing, the official stated that troops serving overseas had "missed out" on gear they should have received, and that the body responsible for equipping them, the Defence Materiel Organisation, had engaged in "inappropriate behaviours".

"We are going to let the troops down if we don't improve the reliability, quality and safety of our equipment," said Stephen Gumley, head of the Defence Materiel Organisation (DMO).

The Age has obtained a secret recording of Gumley's briefing, during which he also told industry suppliers: "Frankly, I did not do a good enough job in this area (soldier's clothing and equipment) so we failed in that and I am going to fix it … what has happened has been a big wake-up call for me. Like someone has chucked a big cold bucket of water over my face."

=== Leaked cable ===
In December 2010, a leaked diplomatic cable under the heading "fuzzy math on costs" described a discussion Gumley and a US naval officer after the release of Australia's May 2009 Defence white paper. The cable expressed doubts about Australia to adequately fund its proposed military expenditure and said that "Gumley was unable to explain how the costing for the equipment of the white paper came about."

=== Resignation ===
On 7 July 2011 the Minister for Defence, Stephen Smith, announced that Gumley had retired, with immediate effect. The Opposition's defence spokesman Senator David Johnston speculated whether Gumley had resigned of his own volition or was "pushed".

== Recognition and awards ==
In 2006, Gumley was named by The Institution of Engineers Australia as one of the 100 most influential engineers in Australia. In 2010, Gumley was made an Officer of the Order of Australia for "service to public sector management, particularly through leadership of the Defence Materiel Organisation, and the development and implementation of significant reforms in procurement and sustainment of military equipment."

== Primary sources ==
1. Gumley an "outstanding choice" to lead the DMO Press release, 30 Jan 2004
2. DMO Schedule and Budget Performance: 13 March 07
3. Speech transcripts and supporting slide presentations by Dr Gumley
