= Governor Gawler (1840 ship) =

Ship

History

United Kingdom
- Name: Governor Gawler
- Namesake: George Gawler
- Owner: Emanuel Underwood
- Builder: Emanuel Underwood
- Launched: 1840
- Fate: Wrecked August 1847

General characteristics
- Tons burthen: 15 (bm)
- Length: 35.3 ft (10.8 m)
- Beam: 8.8 ft (2.7 m)
- Depth: 7.9 ft (2.4 m)
- Sail plan: Schooner
- Complement: 2
- Notes: Two masts

Governor Gawler was built in 1840. This made her the first sailing vessel built in South Australia. She traded between Port Lincoln and Port Adelaide, but also carried cargo and passengers to Melbourne and Hobart Town, including soldiers, police, criminals, an executioner, as well as numerous civilians. When she wrecked in 1847, she was the first South Australian ship to be wrecked.

== Origins ==
Captain Emanuel Underwood arrived in Port Adelaide in 1840 aboard Baboo. He brought with him the frame of a small vessel of 15 tons (register), together with sails, spars, ropes, and tackle. He then assembled her on the mudflats of Port River and named her for George Gawler, the governor of the colony.

== Fate ==
Governor Gawler, Underwood, master, was making for Port Lincoln when a storm drove her northward and onto a reef near Reevesby Island, in the Sir Joseph Banks Group on 1 August 1847. Her two crew and two passengers survived. Petrel rescued the survivors some two days later.
