= Guy Wylly =

Recipient of the Victoria Cross

Guy George Egerton Wylly VC CB DSO
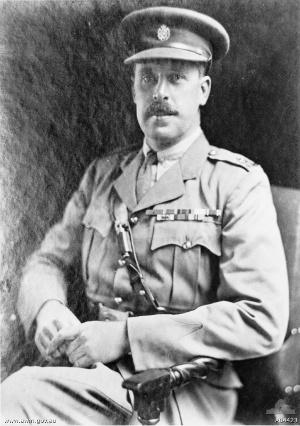
- Major Guy Wylly c. 1920
- Born: 17 February 1880; Hobart, Tasmania, Australia
- Died: 9 January 1962 (aged 81); Camberley, Surrey, England
- Military career
- Allegiance: Australia; United Kingdom
- Branch: Tasmanian Colonial Forces (1900); British Army (1900–1902); British Indian Army (1902–1933)
- Service years: 1900–1933
- Rank: Colonel
- Commands: 6th Duke of Connaught's Own Lancers
- Conflicts: Second Boer War; First World War; Third Anglo-Afghan War; North-West Frontier
- Awards: Victoria Cross; Companion of the Order of the Bath; Distinguished Service Order; Mentioned in Despatches (7)
- Other work: Aide-de-camp to the Commander-in-Chief, India (1906–09); Aide-de-camp to King George V (1926–33)

Guy George Egerton Wylly, VC, CB, DSO (17 February 1880 – 9 January 1962) was a senior British Indian Army officer and an Australian recipient of the Victoria Cross, the highest award for gallantry in the face of the enemy that can be awarded to British and Commonwealth forces, for actions during the Second Boer War.

== Early life ==
Wylly was born on 17 February 1880 in Hobart, Tasmania, to Edward Arthur Egerton Wylly; an officer in the Indian Army, and his wife Henrietta Mary, née Clerk.

As an infant Wylly went to India with his parents, before settling at Sandy Bay, Hobart in 1885, where he attended The Hutchins School before completing his education at the Collegiate School of St Peter, Adelaide. His father retired from the army in 1888.

== Boer War ==
As a 20-year-old, he became a lieutenant in the Tasmanian Imperial Bushmen, raised to fight in the Second Boer War.

On 1 September 1900 near Warm Bad, Transvaal, South Africa, Lieutenant Wylly was part of a force under Herbert Plumer which engaged a small group of Boers at Rooikop. The Imperial forces captured 100 rifles, 40,000 rounds of ammunition, 7 Boers, 350 cattle, and 2 supply wagons. After the engagement, Wylly was reported to have been severely wounded, along with another Tasmanian officer, and 3 men from the Bushmen.

On 18 September 1900, The London Gazette carried an announcement that Wylly had been granted a commission as a second lieutenant in the Royal Berkshire Regiment, on the nomination of the Governor of Tasmania, backdated to 19 May 1900. On 16 November, this appointment was cancelled for some reason. On 23 November his VC was gazetted, with the following citation:

Tasmanian Imperial Bushmen, Lieutenant Guy G. E. Wylly On the 1st September, 1900, near Warm Bad, Lieutenant Wylly was with the advanced scouts of a foraging party. They were passing through a narrow gorge, very rocky and thickly wooded, when the enemy in force suddenly opened fire at short range from hidden cover, wounding six out of the party of eight, including Lieutenant Wylly. That Officer, seeing that one of his men was badly wounded in the leg, and that his horse was shot, went back to the man's assistance, made him take his (Lieutenant Wylly's) horse, and opened fire from behind a rock to cover the retreat of the others, at the imminent risk of being cut off himself. Colonel T. E. Hickman, D.S.O., considers that the gallant conduct of Lieutenant Wylly saved Corporal Brown from being killed or captured, and that his subsequent action in firing to cover the retreat was "instrumental in saving others of his men from death or capture."

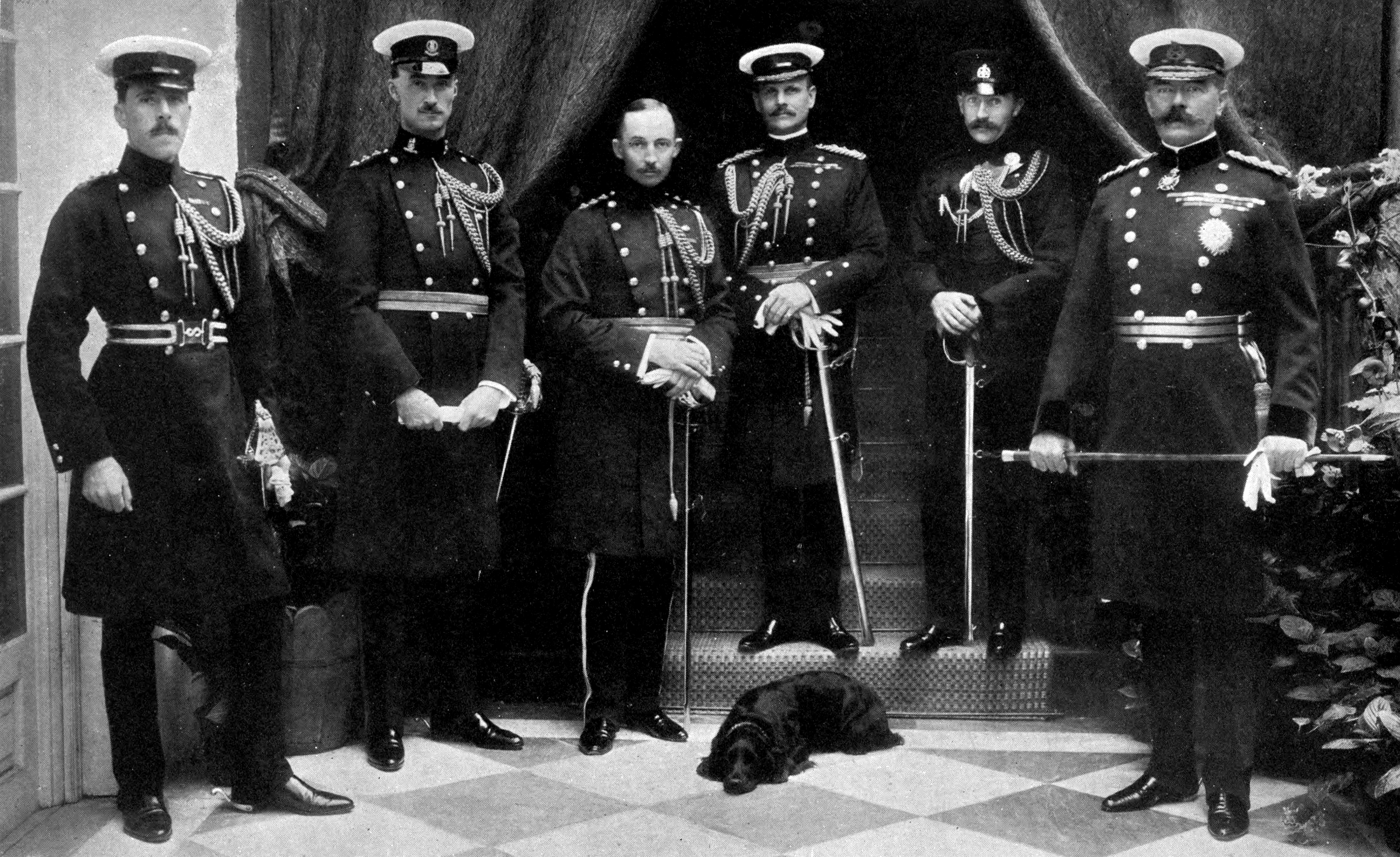
Kitchener and his personal staff in India. From left to right: Lieutenant G. G. E. Wylly; Captain N. J. C. Livingstone-Learmonth; Capt. O. A. G. Fitzgerald; Colonel W. R. Birdwood; Captain W. F. Basset; Lord Kitchener.

On 5 December, came a new commission as a second lieutenant, now in the South Lancashire Regiment. Confusingly, The Times of 14 January 1901 listed in a report of killed and wounded "2nd Berkshire Regiment.—Lieut. G. Wylly, dangerously wounded, doing well, Nooitgedacht, date not stated." Whether this was a new wound, or he had not yet recovered from the wound he received in September, his condition was such that he was invalided to England, leaving Cape Town on 5 March 1901, on the hospital ship Avoca, which arrived at Southampton on 26 March. The report of this also indicates that he was serving with 2nd Battalion, South Lancs. By the following Sunday, 31 March, when the United Kingdom Census 1901 was taken, he was staying with his uncle, Robert M Clark, a retired colonel, at Charlton House in Shepton Mallet. He was presented with his VC at Buckingham Palace by King Edward VII on 25 July 1901.

On 5 March 1902 he was promoted to lieutenant in the South Lancashire Regiment. He transferred to the Indian Army on 1 October 1902.

On 7 January 1906 Wylly was appointed the aide-de-camp to the commander in chief, India, who was then Herbert Kitchener, 1st Earl Kitchener. Wylly had been serving with the Corps of Guides. He was promoted captain on 26 April 1909. In 1913 he passed the examination for entry to the Staff College, Quetta, but not high enough up the list to be admitted immediately.

== First World War and after ==
Four months after the British entry into World War I, he was appointed a staff captain on 14 December 1914, and advanced to brigade major on 14 September 1915. He finally completed the staff course at Quetta in February 1916, was promoted to temporary major on 26 April 1916, and on 20 June 1916 he was appointed a general staff officer, Grade 2. He was Mentioned in Despatches on 15 June 1916. Following Lord Kitchener's death, Wylly, along with others who had also served as Kitchener's aides, received a bequest of £200. He received a further Mention in Despatches on 15 May 1917, and again on 11 December 1917. He was awarded the Distinguished Service Order in the 1918 New Year Honours.

The war came to an end on 11 November 1918 and, during the Third Anglo-Afghan War, Wylly again served as a general staff officer, Grade 2 from 6 May 1919. He was promoted lieutenant colonel on 26 April 1926. From 15 November 1926 until his retirement in 1933, Wylly was an aide-de-camp to King George V. On 9 November 1929 he was appointed an assistant adjutant and quartermaster general (AA & QMG) in India, he had also by now been given brevet promotion to colonel. He received substantive promotion to colonel on 26 April 1930, with seniority from 15 November 1926. On 6 May 1931 he was Mentioned in Despatches for his part in the campaign against the Afridi and Red Shirt Rebellion as AA & QMG Peshawar District. He was appointed Companion of the Order of the Bath in the 1933 Birthday Honours of King George V. He received a further Mention on 8 September 1933 for his part in the Chitral Reliefs. He stepped down as AA & QMG of Peshawar on 9 November 1933, retired from the army on 30 December. A final Mention was gazetted on 3 July 1934, for his part in the Mohmand and Bajaur Operations between 28 July and 3 October 1933. He attended an investiture at Buckingham Palace on 27 February 1934 to receive his insignia for the Order of the Bath. Following his retirement he worked for the Retired Army Officers Employment Bureau. Although he did not reach the age limit for service until 17 February 1940, he was not recalled for service in the Second World War.

He died on 9 January 1962 in Camberley, Surrey, at the age of 81.
