= William Hutchins =

The Venerable William Hutchins (18 March 1792 – 4 June 1841) was an English churchman and academic, a Fellow of Pembroke College, Cambridge. Hutchins was born in Ansley, Warwickshire, England, second son of vicar of Ansley, Rev. Joseph Hutchins.

Hutchins was educated at Atherstone Grammar School and Pembroke College, Cambridge. After curacies at Wirksworth and Ireton he was elected a Fellow of Pembroke.

Hutchins became the first and only Anglican Archdeacon of Van Diemen's Land, a position offered him in 1836 by William Grant Broughton, bishop of Australia.

Hutchins was a supporter of education through the Church, and because of this The Hutchins School, established in 1846 in Hobart, was named in his honour. The school continues to operate as at 2020.
