= John Bisdee =

Recipient of the Victoria Cross

John Hutton Bisdee VC OBE
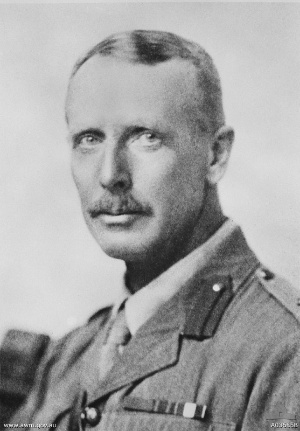
- Major John Bisdee c.1915
- Born: 28 September 1869; Melton Mowbray, Tasmania
- Died: 14 January 1930 (aged 60); Jericho, Tasmania
- Burial place: St James Churchyard, Jericho
- Military career
- Allegiance: Australia
- Branch: Australian Army
- Service years: 1900–03; 1906–21
- Rank: Lieutenant Colonel
- Commands: 26th Light Horse Regiment (1913–15)
- Conflicts: Second Boer War; First World War; Sinai and Palestine campaign
- Awards: Victoria Cross; Officer of the Order of the British Empire; Mentioned in Despatches

John Hutton Bisdee, VC, OBE (28 September 1869 – 14 January 1930) was an Australian recipient of the Victoria Cross, the highest award for gallantry in the face of the enemy that can be awarded to British and Commonwealth forces.

== Early life and family ==
Bisdee was born on 28 September 1869 at Hutton Park, Melton Mowbray, Tasmania. He was educated at The Hutchins School in Hobart.

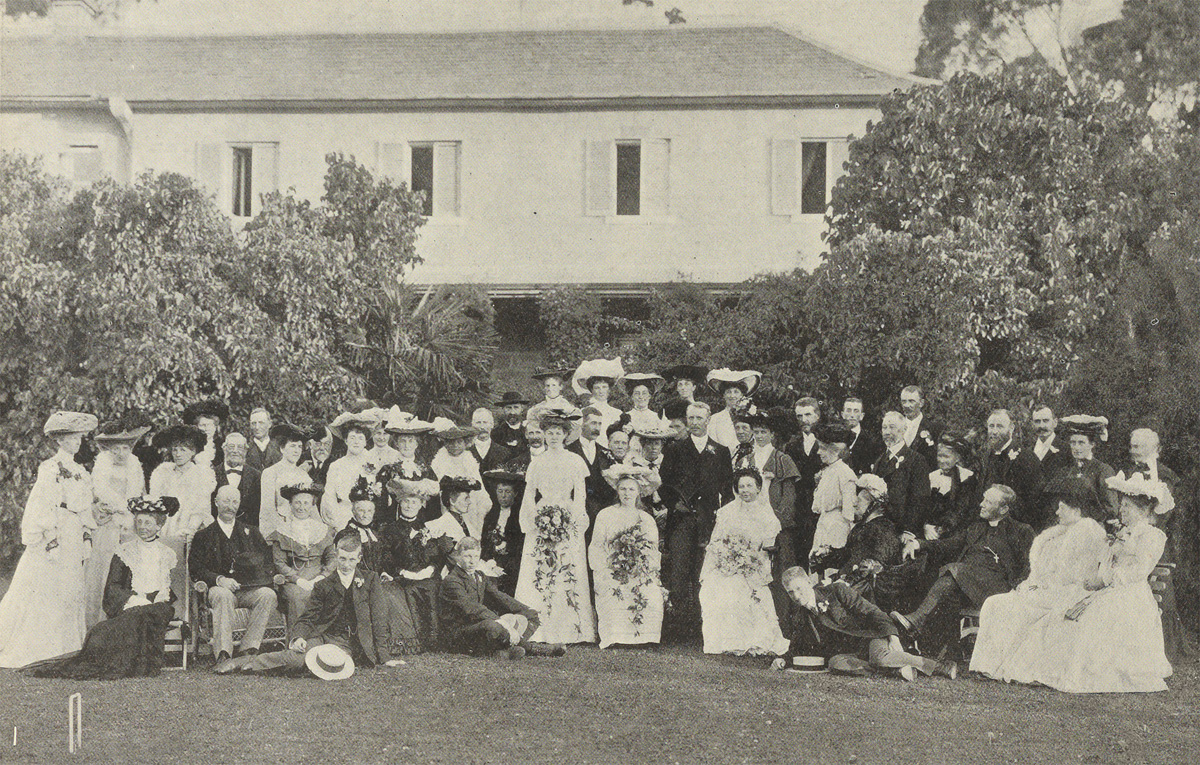
The wedding of John Hutton Bisdee and Georgiana Thodosia Hale at Newlands in Hobart, Tasmania in 1904.

In 1904 he married Georgiana Thodosia Hale who was the daughter of Bishop Matthew Blagden Hale.

== Military service ==
When Bisdee was 30 years old, and a trooper with the Tasmanian Imperial Bushmen during the Second Boer War, the following deeds took place for which he was awarded the VC.

On 1 September 1900 near Warmbad, Transvaal, South Africa, Trooper Bisdee was one of an advance scouting party passing through a narrow gorge, when the enemy suddenly opened fire at close range and six out of the party of eight were wounded, including two officers. The horse of one of the wounded officers bolted and Trooper Bisdee dismounted, put the officer on his own horse and took him out of range of the very heavy fire.

Bisdee returned to Tasmania in 1902, and received the Victoria Cross from the Governor during a review in Hobart on 11 August 1902 to mark the coronation of King Edward VII.

He later served as a lieutenant colonel in the First World War, where he was appointed as an Officer of the Order of the British Empire (OBE), as well as being Mentioned in Despatches.

== Later life ==
He died on 14 January 1930 and was buried in the St James Churchyard, Jericho, Tasmania. His Victoria Cross is on display at the Tasmanian Museum and Art Gallery, Hobart.
