= McClintock Arctic expedition =

British expedition of Arctic exploration

- Melville Island, Canada
- Date: 1857
- Location: The Arctic
- Participants: Francis Leopold McClintock and team
- Outcome: Returned with the only written message recovered from the Franklin expedition

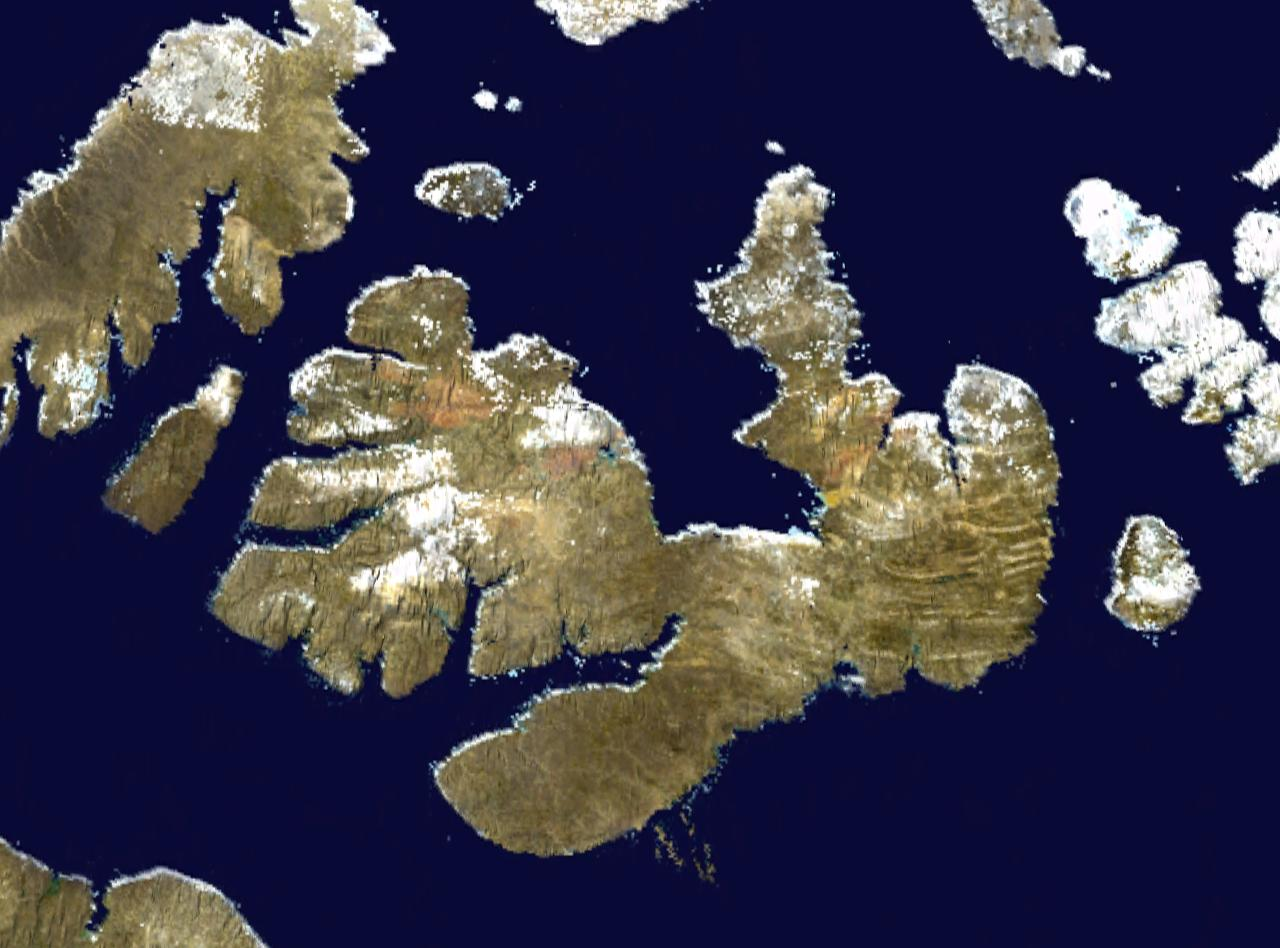
Melville Island, Canada

The McClintock Arctic expedition of 1857 was a British effort to locate the last remains of Franklin's lost expedition. Led by Francis Leopold McClintock, RN aboard the steam yacht Fox, the expedition spent two years in the region and ultimately returned with the only written message recovered from the doomed expedition. McClintock and crew were awarded the Arctic medal in recognition of their achievements.

== Preparation ==
When John Rae reported that found artifacts and Inuit testimony placed the death of final members of Franklin's lost expedition near Back's Great Fish River in 1850, Lady Jane Franklin called for an expedition to locate these remains. A secondary goal was to secure any possible claim by Franklin as to discovery of the Northwest Passage. To be led by McClintock, who had participated in the Arctic explorations of Sir John Ross, Horatio Austin and Henry Kellett, it was the fifth expedition privately financed by Franklin's widow, as by this time the British government had abandoned any hopes of rescue. Lady Franklin purchased the 177 ton Fox in April 1857, after other efforts to secure a vessel failed.

== Expedition ==
Sledge flag used by McClintock during the expedition, flown on his sledge which itself was named Lady Franklin

With an experienced crew of 25, the Fox set sail from Aberdeen on 1 July 1857, after extensive refitting and external sheathing suitable for Arctic service. Inuit interpreter Carl Peterson, who had served under Elisha Kent Kane, was included. They quickly stocked provisions, including lemon juice to prevent scurvy. The government provided additional equipment and arms.

They briefly put ashore to several ports on Greenland, sending home an ailing crewman and obtaining coal, dogs, provisions, and Inuit guides Anton Christian and Samuel Emanuel. They set out again in early August and soon encountered icebergs off Disco Bay, reaching Melville Bay on 12 August.

=== First winter ===
The ice gradually closed in on the Fox in just a few days, the ship making small advances with much effort. Some seal hunting provided sport and extended their sled dogs' rations as they drifted with the pack through August. By mid-September, they were slowly drifting west among the approaching icebergs, still hoping for liberation to Upernavik, but on 18 September, they began to prepare the ship for winter. Wildlife, including birds, seals, narwhal and polar bears provided hunting as the crew settled into the winter monotony. The ship's surgeon, Dr. Walker, conducted schooling for the crew, and a successful November bear hunt produced a skin that was to be presented to Lady Franklin. The seasonal darkness settled in.

December began with the death of a crewman, stoker Robert Scott, who succumbed to injuries following a fall down a hatchway. His remains were committed to the deep on 4 December. Temperatures averaged below −20 °F (−29 °C) while the crew practiced the construction of snow huts. The returning daylight improved morale as February 1858 progressed and the icebergs began to spread out. By mid-March, open lanes of water had begun to appear, but despite several efforts to free the ship, the Fox was held by the ice until 26 April. They had been held by the ice for 242 days.

=== Arctic summer ===
Two days later, they were safely anchored at Holsteinborg, Greenland, where their health, spirits and provisions were restored until their departure on 10 May. They remained in the area of Upernavik, attempts at advancement forestalled by the remaining pack ice. By July, their progress improved as open leads in the ice presented themselves. Supplies were supplemented by regular hunting of polar bear, seal, reindeer and various birds. Meetings and barter with Inuit, emboldened by previous contact with European explorers, occurred throughout the summer. However, no information regarding Franklin was obtained, although they had some recollection of other explorers, including John Rae.

By August, the Fox was steaming towards Beechey Island, known to have been Franklin's first winter encampment in 1845–1846. They arrived on 11 August, the once desolate site now including a depot house and several small boats. Letters left previously at the site were taken aboard. On Beechey, McClintock placed a stone monument to Franklin and his crew, provided by Lady Franklin and constructed by Henry Grinnell, before departing on 16 August.

Through Barrow Strait, the Fox passed the same waters that held the Enterprise and Investigator nine years earlier during the McClure Arctic Expedition. Bellot Strait was explored as the ship probed the westward ice, already anticipating the onset of winter. Caches of provisions were made on shore in anticipation of separate explorations in the coming spring. By 28 September, they had pushed to their wintering place off of Point Kennedy. The ship was prepared for winter once again, and a magnetic observatory was built.

=== Second winter ===
By November, the crew had again settled into winter habits, occasionally hunting and brewing sugar beer. Dogsled exploration and depot parties braved drifting ice and temperatures of −15 °F (−26 °C). On 7 November, the ship's engineer George Brands died suddenly, presumably from apoplexy, and was buried on shore. Temperatures reached −47 °F (−44 °C) as animals became scarce and winds became fierce. No regular schooling was conducted, although several crewmembers busied themselves by studying navigation. The new year was welcomed amid improvised celebrations below deck. By February, animals began to return with the increasing sunlight. One member of the crew came down with scurvy, as he had avoided the preserved meats.

== Discoveries ==
=== Traces of Franklin ===
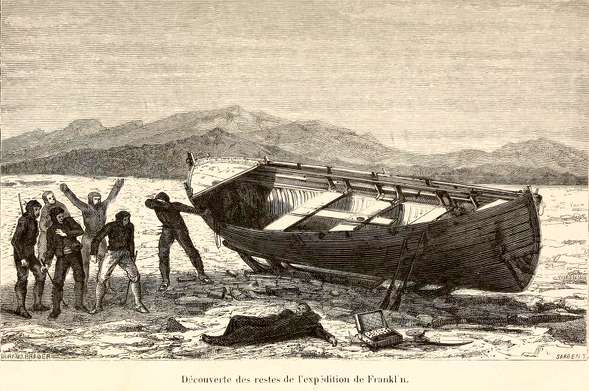
Discovery of the remains

The sled dogs were separated into three teams as land parties—McClintock, Young, and Walker—departed to extend the search on 17 February, with temperatures no less severe. McClintock's dogs experienced much difficulty with the journey, and the planned trip was shortened. Nights were passed in snow huts. On 1 March, they were surprised to encounter four Inuit returning from a seal hunt. One of them wore a naval button that came, he said, from a group of Europeans who had starved near a river – Franklin's last survivors, as confirmed by John Rae in 1854. Another had met with Rae's expedition in the same area.

Two days later, the entire 45 members of this group of Inuit arrived. McClintock purchased all of the Franklin relics they possessed, mostly silverware and buttons. While none of the natives had seen Franklin's crew alive, several had seen their remains. Some told of a group of survivors from a three-masted ship crushed by the ice west of King William Island, placing them in the same area as described by Rae. McClintock's party returned to the Fox with this evidence on 14 March, having travelled some 360 miles (580 km) and charting 120 miles (190 km) of new coast. Young's party had already returned to the ship without major discoveries. Walker's team, sent to retrieve cached provisions, returned without success on 25 March.

On 2 April, McClintock finally set out for King William Island to followup on the Inuit reports, with a plan to divide his company into two teams to more quickly explore the island – Lieutenant Hobson would lead one party to explore the north coast of King William Island, and McClintock himself would lead one along the southern shore. On 20 April McClintock encountered another group of Inuit. In addition to providing extensive relics, they described two ships near King William's Island. One of the ships had sunk in deep water, while the other was broken upon the ice with one body aboard. They described the European survivors making for the "large river" with boats in autumn that year, many falling on the way. The following winter, their bones had been found. Following their directions, a skeleton was located on the route on 24 May, confirmed as a crewman by the remaining garments. He appeared to have died where he fell on the journey.

=== Final communications ===
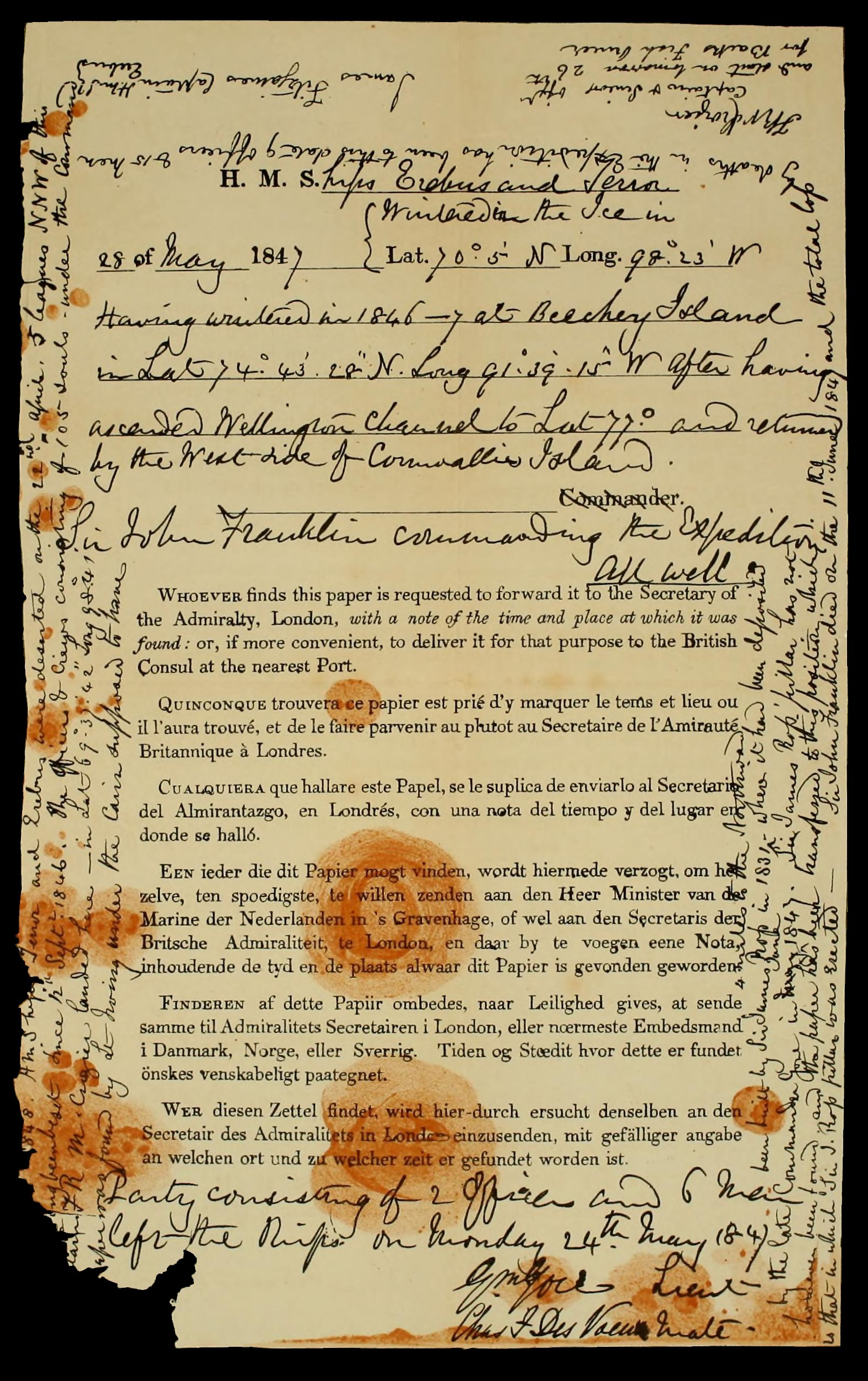
The final Franklin communication

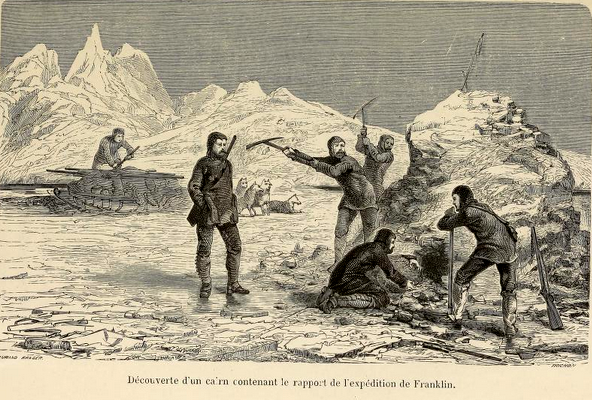
Discovery of the cairn

Meanwhile, near Cape Jane Franklin, the sledge party led by Lieutenant Hobson located the first written communication recovered from Franklin's Expedition inside a message cairn (note that the date of wintering at Beechey has been attributed to error):

H. M. ships 'Erebus' and 'Terror' wintered in the ice in

28 of May, 1847 lat. 70° 05' N. long. 98° 23' W.

Having wintered in 1846–7 at Beechey Island in lat. 74° 43' 28" N.; long. 91° 39' 15" W., after having ascended Wellington Channel to lat. 77° and returned by the west side of Cornwallis Island.

Sir John Franklin commanding the expedition.

All well.

Party consisting of 2 officers and 6 men left the ships on Monday, 24 May 1847.

Gm. Gore, Lieut.
Chas. F. Des Voeus, Mate.

Handwritten around the margin of this communication was the following:

25th April 1848

HMShips Terror and Erebus were deserted on the 22nd April 5 leagues NNW of this having been beset since 12th Sept 1846.

The officers and crews consisting of 105 souls under the command of Captain F. R. M. Crozier landed here — in Lat. 69°37’42’’ Long. 98°41’

This paper was found by Lt. Irving under the cairn supposed to have been built by Sir James Ross in 1831 — 4 miles to the Northward — where it had been deposited by the late Commander Gore in May June 1847.

Sir James Ross’ pillar has not however been found and the paper has been transferred to this position which is that in which Sir J. Ross’ pillar was erected.

Sir John Franklin died on the 11th of June 1847 and the total loss by deaths in the Expedition has been to this date 9 officers and 15 men.

[signed] F. R. M. Crozier Captain & Senior Offr

And start on tomorrow 26th for Backs Fish River

[signed] James Fitzjames Captain HMS Erebus

Signed by Captains Crozier and Fitzjames, it also states "and start (on) to-morrow, 26th, for Back's Fish River," and documents the position of original placement at Sir James Ross's pillar. At this point, Franklin's crews were likely retreating for their lives. McClintock, a few days behind Hobson, continued searching the area for additional clues, which included the discovery of a large boat that had been prepared for river use, fastened to a large sledge. The boat contained the skeletal remains of two men and an extensive collection of objects that would have little value in an Arctic crossing. In exploring Back Bay into June, Hobson also found a cairn with a second note left by Lieutenant Gore in May 1847, its content similar to the first. More abandoned equipment surrounded the cairn, the most interesting of which were taken. These sites appear to have been untouched by the natives, and no part of a ship was seen.

Amid melting ice, McClintock reached the Fox on 19 June. Hobson had arrived five days earlier, unable to walk from his ordeal, but recovered on ship. Young had also returned earlier, similarly impaired by the harsh conditions, but had set out again. A few members of the crew had developed signs of scurvy, and Thomas Blackwell, the man who first contracted the disease, had perished of it before McClintock's return. Young returned again on 27 June, having mapped Peel Sound, but finding no traces of Franklin.

Preparations for departure were made in July, and a cairn containing detailed records of their efforts was constructed. On 9 August, the ice allowed them to begin steaming out, and despite the loss of their two engineers and dangerous ice, open seas were soon reached. The port of Godhavn on the west coast of Greenland was reached on 29 July, where their Inuit guides were paid and discharged. The Fox made port in London on 21 September 1859, having lost three members of her crew.

== Legacy ==
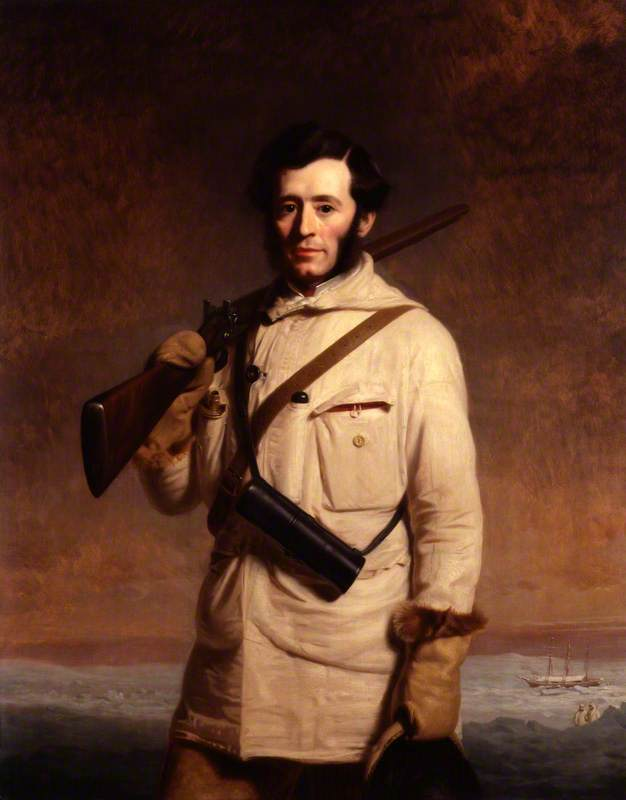
Portrait of Leopold McClintock by Stephen Pearce, 1859

McClintock and Hobson discovered the last written communications from the last survivors of the Franklin expedition, confirming elements of the history maintained by local Inuit as well as the date of Franklin's own death. McClintock provided the first survey of the west coast of King William's Land. In recognition of his services, he was knighted, and elected a Fellow of the Royal Society in 1865. McClintock and members of his crew were awarded the Arctic Medal as well.

McClintock's observations of persistent pack ice in Victoria Strait confirmed the hopelessness of Franklin's attempts to push south through the unexplored passage. A separate channel to the east of King William Island through James Ross Strait and Rae Strait, sheltered from the pack by the island but unknown to Franklin, might have provided a safe passage to his ships. Roald Amundsen would ultimately achieve the first complete navigation of the Northwest passage via these straits in 1903–1906.

On 30 January 1920, The Pioche Record reported that explorer Vilhjalmur Stefansson discovered a lost cache from the 1853 McClintock expedition on Melville Island. Clothing and food from the cache were in excellent condition despite the harsh arctic conditions.
