= Franklin's lost expedition =

1845–48 British failed Arctic exploration

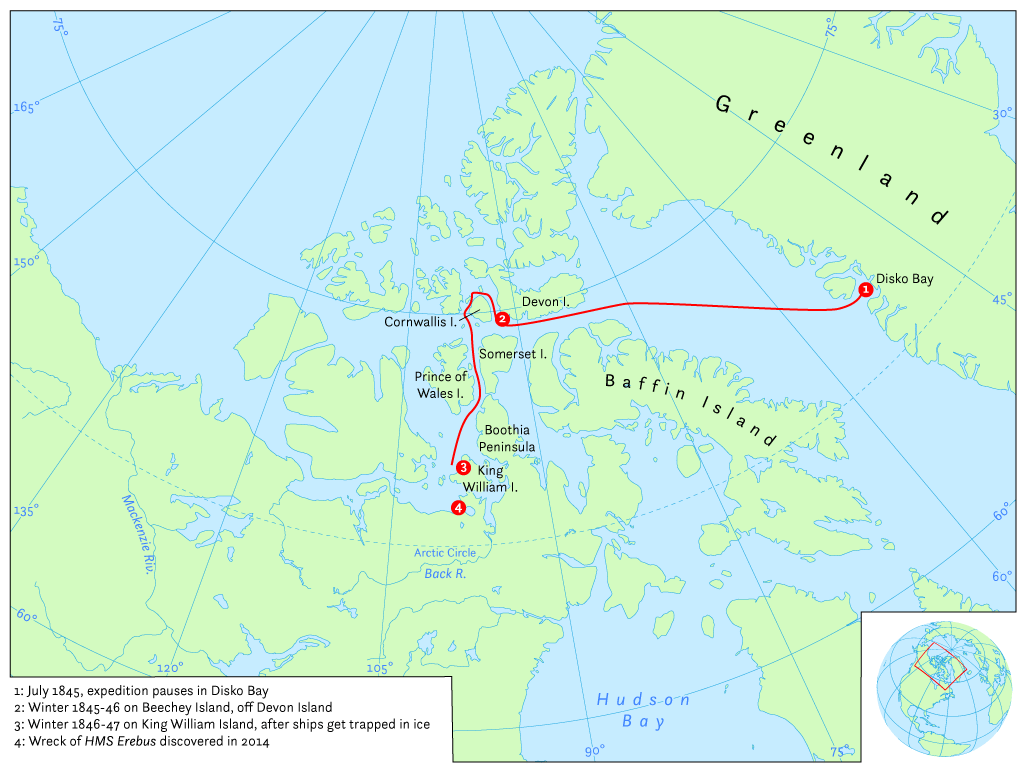
Map of the probable routes taken by HMS Erebus and HMS Terror during Franklin's lost expedition. Disko Bay is about 3,200 km (2,000 mi) from the mouth of the Mackenzie River.

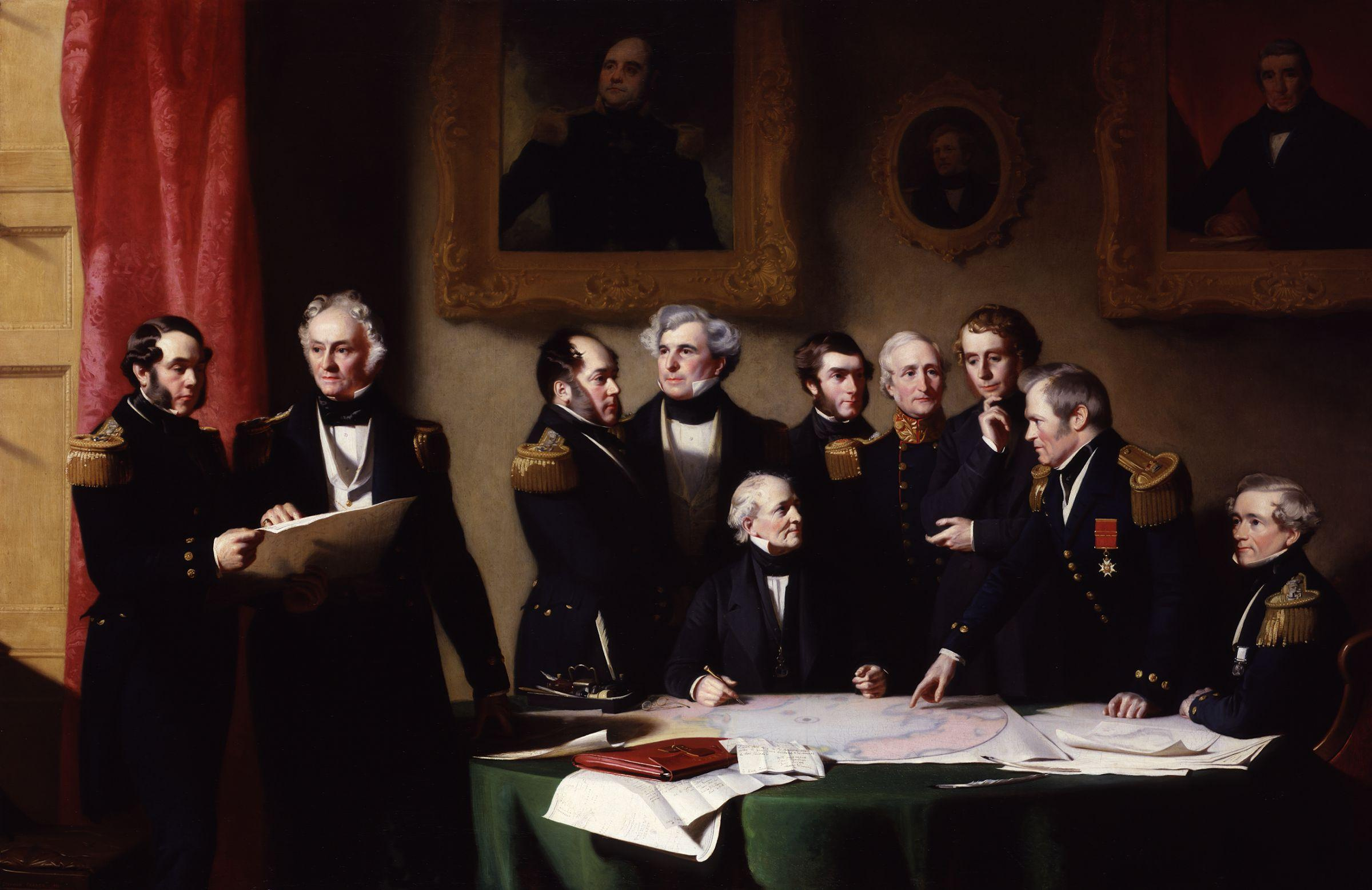
The Arctic Council Planning a Search for Sir John Franklin by Stephen Pearce, 1851. Left to right are: Sir George Back; Sir William Edward Parry; Edward Joseph Bird; Sir James Clark Ross; Sir Francis Beaufort (seated); Sir John Barrow, Jnr.; Sir Edward Sabine; William A. Baillie-Hamilton; Sir John Richardson; and Frederick William Beechey.

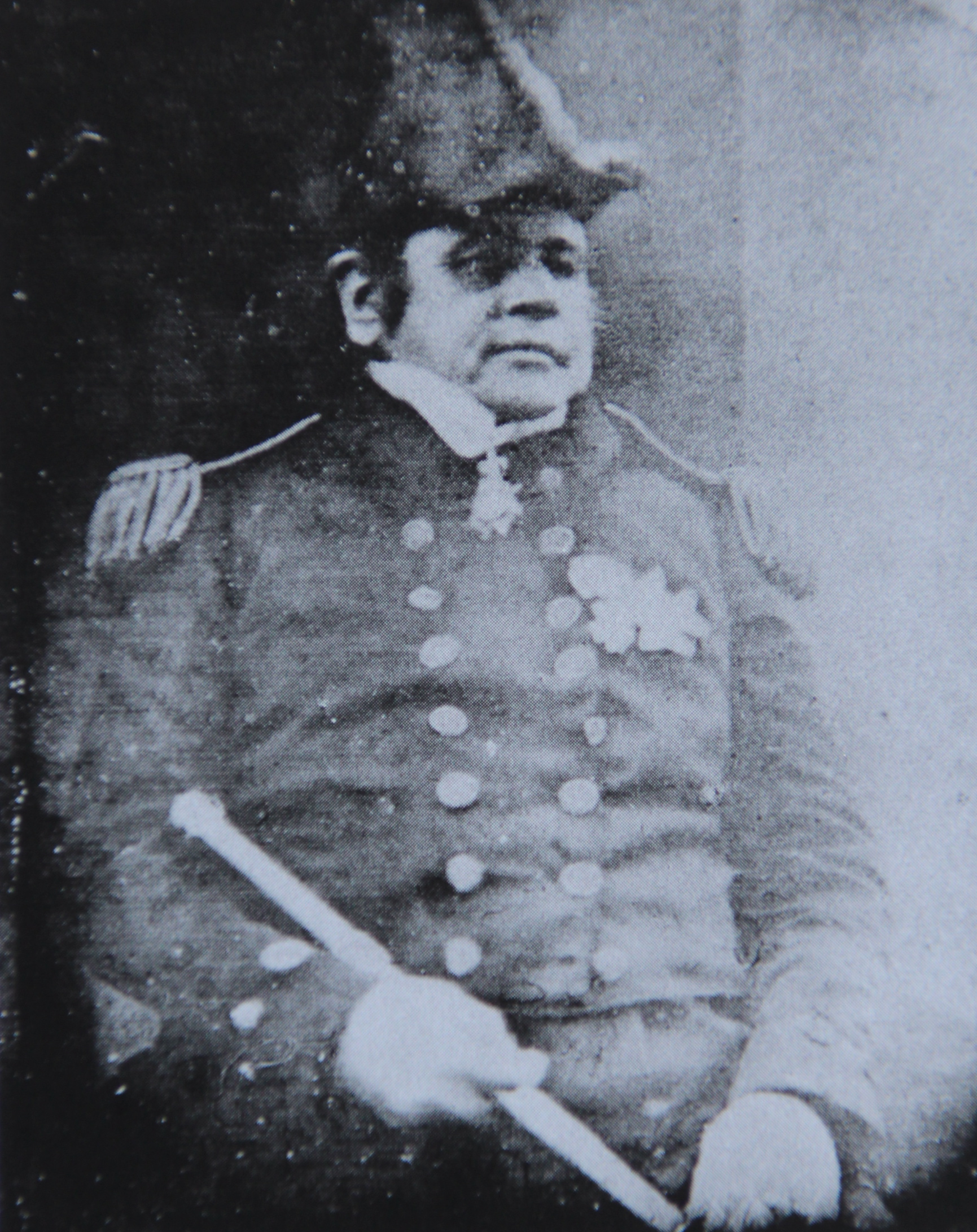
Sir John Franklin was Barrow's reluctant choice to lead the expedition.

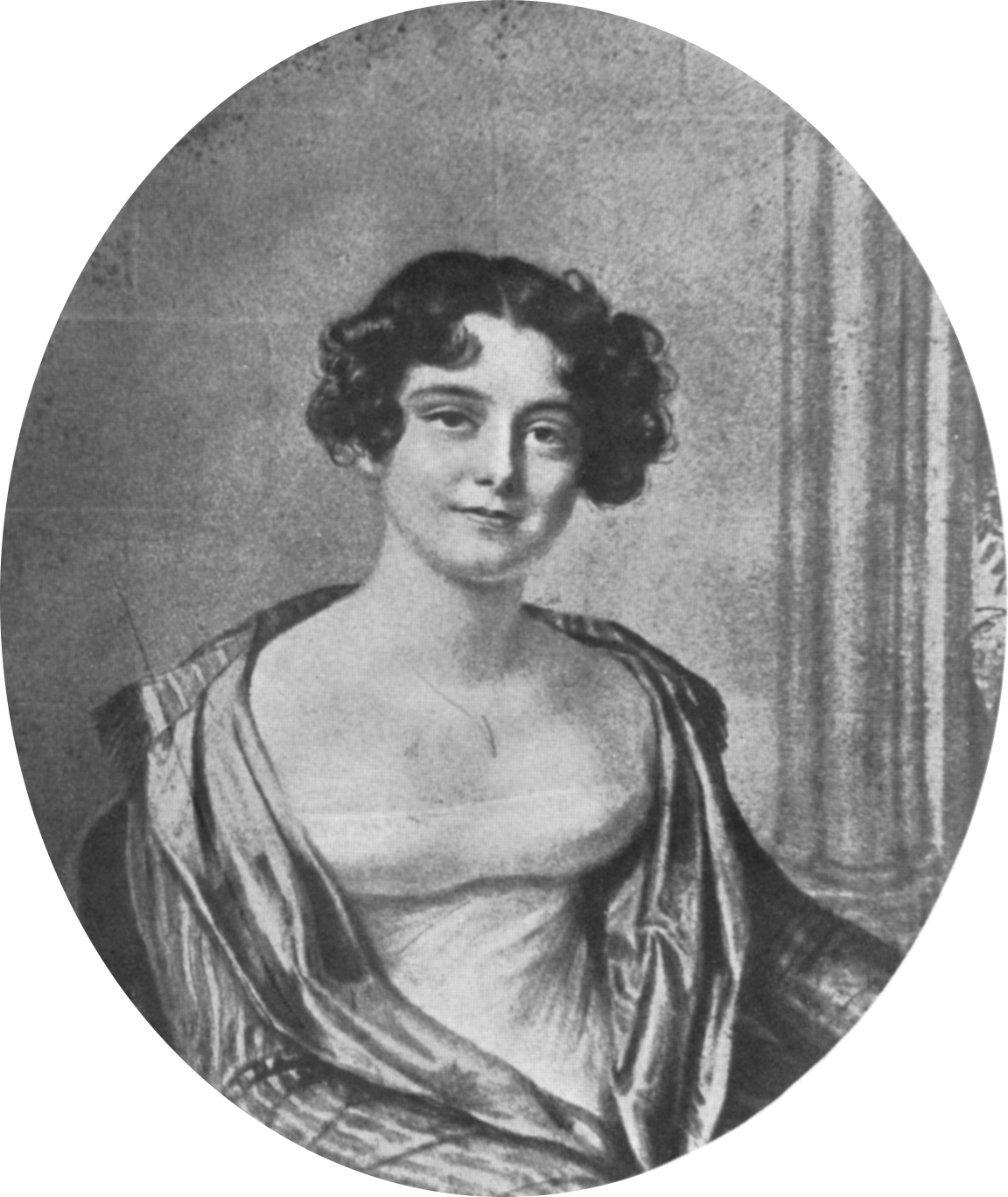
Portrait of Jane Griffin (later Lady Franklin), 24, in 1815. She married John Franklin in 1828, a year before he was knighted.

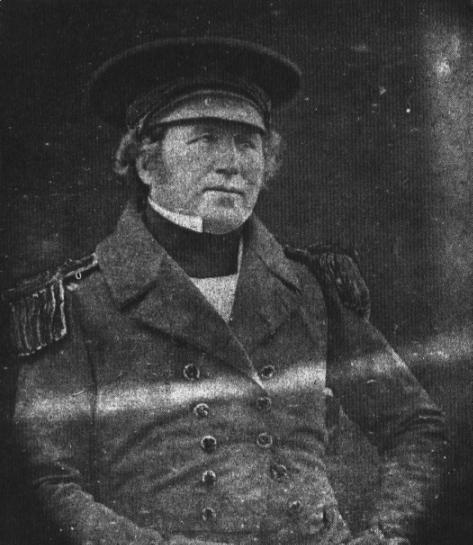
Captain Francis Crozier, executive officer for the expedition, commanded HMS Terror.

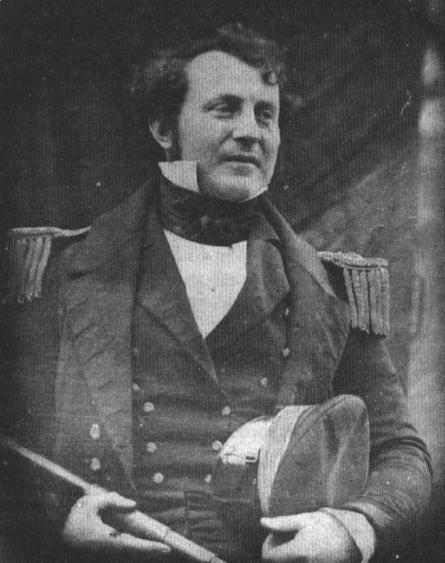
Commander James Fitzjames commanded the expedition's flagship, HMS Erebus.

Franklin's lost expedition was a failed British voyage of Arctic exploration led by Captain Sir John Franklin that departed England in 1845 aboard two ships, HMS Erebus and HMS Terror, and was assigned to traverse the last unnavigated sections of the Northwest Passage in the Canadian Arctic and to record magnetic data to help determine whether a better understanding could aid navigation. The expedition met with disaster after both ships and their crews, a total of 129 officers and men, became icebound in Victoria Strait near King William Island in what is today the Canadian territory of Nunavut. After being icebound for more than a year, Erebus and Terror were abandoned in April 1848, by which point two dozen men, including Franklin, had died. The survivors, now led by Franklin's second-in-command, Francis Crozier, and Erebus's captain, James Fitzjames, set out for the Canadian mainland and disappeared, presumably having perished.

Pressed by Franklin's wife, Jane, and others, the Admiralty launched a search for the missing expedition in 1848. In the many subsequent searches in the decades afterwards, several artefacts from the expedition were discovered, including the remains of two men, which were returned to Britain. A series of scientific studies in modern times suggested that the men of the expedition did not all die quickly. Hypothermia, starvation, lead poisoning or zinc deficiency and diseases including scurvy, along with general exposure to a hostile environment while lacking adequate clothing and nutrition, killed everyone on the expedition in the years after it was last sighted by a whaling ship in July 1845. Cut marks on some of the bones recovered during these studies also supported allegations of cannibalism reported by Franklin searcher John Rae in 1854.

Despite the expedition's notorious failure, it did succeed in exploring the vicinity of one of the many Northwest Passages that would eventually be discovered. Robert McClure led one of the expeditions that investigated the fate of Franklin's expedition, a voyage which was also beset by great challenges and later controversies. McClure's expedition returned after finding an ice-bound route that connected the Atlantic Ocean to the Pacific Ocean. The Northwest Passage was not navigated by boat until 1906, when Roald Amundsen traversed the passage on the Gjøa.

In 2014, a search team led by Parks Canada located the wreck of Erebus in the eastern portion of Queen Maud Gulf. Two years later, the Arctic Research Foundation found the wreck of Terror south of King William Island, in the body of water named Terror Bay. Research and dive expeditions are an annual occurrence at the wreck sites, now protected as a combined National Historic Site called the Wrecks of HMS Erebus and HMS Terror National Historic Site.

== Background ==
The search by Europeans for a western shortcut by sea from Europe to Asia began with the voyages of Portuguese and Spanish explorers such as Bartolomeu Dias, Vasco da Gama and Christopher Columbus in the 15th century. By the mid-19th century numerous exploratory expeditions had been mounted. These voyages, when successful, added to the sum of European geographic knowledge about the Western Hemisphere, particularly North America. As that knowledge grew, exploration gradually shifted towards the Arctic.

Sixteenth- and seventeenth-century voyagers who made geographic discoveries about North America included Martin Frobisher, John Davis, Henry Hudson and William Baffin. In 1670 the incorporation of the Hudson's Bay Company (HBC) led to further exploration of the Canadian coastlines, interior and adjacent Arctic seas. In the 18th century explorers of this region included James Knight, Christopher Middleton, Samuel Hearne, James Cook, Alexander MacKenzie and George Vancouver. By 1800 their discoveries had conclusively demonstrated that no Northwest Passage between the Pacific and Atlantic oceans existed in the temperate latitudes.

In 1804 Sir John Barrow became Second Secretary of the Admiralty, a post he held until 1845. Barrow began pushing for the Royal Navy to find a Northwest Passage over the top of Canada and to navigate toward the North Pole, organising a major series of expeditions. Over those four decades explorers including John Ross; David Buchan; William Edward Parry; Frederick William Beechey; James Clark Ross (nephew of John Ross); George Back; Peter Warren Dease and Thomas Simpson led productive expeditions to the Canadian Arctic. Among those explorers was John Franklin, who first travelled to the region in 1818 as second-in-command of an expedition towards the North Pole on the ships Dorothea and Trent. Franklin was subsequently leader of two overland expeditions to and along the Canadian Arctic coast, in 1819–1822 and 1825–1827.

By 1845 the combined discoveries of all these expeditions had reduced the unknown parts of the Canadian Arctic that might contain a Northwest Passage to a quadrilateral area of about 181,300 km^{2} (70,000 sq mi). It was in this unexplored area that the next expedition was to sail, heading west through Lancaster Sound, then west and south – however ice, land and other obstacles might allow – with the goal of finding a Northwest Passage. The distance to be navigated was roughly 1,670 km (1,040 mi).

== Preparations ==
=== Command ===
In 1845, leading Admiralty figure Sir John Barrow was 82 years old and nearing the end of his career. He felt that the expeditions were close to finding a Northwest Passage, perhaps through what Barrow believed to be an ice-free Open Polar Sea around the North Pole. Barrow deliberated over who should command the next expedition. Parry, his first choice, was tired of the Arctic and politely declined. His second choice, James Clark Ross, also declined because he had promised his new wife that he had finished polar exploration. His third choice, James Fitzjames, was rejected by the Admiralty for his youth. Barrow also considered Back but thought he was too argumentative. Francis Crozier, another candidate, declined out of modesty. Reluctantly, Barrow settled on the 59-year-old Franklin.

The expedition was to consist of two ships, HMS Erebus and HMS Terror, both of which had been used for James Clark Ross' expedition to the Antarctic in 1839–1843, during which Crozier had commanded Terror. Franklin was given command of Erebus, with Fitzjames as the vessel's second-in-command; Crozier was appointed his executive officer and was again made commander of Terror. Franklin received command of the expedition on 7 February 1845, and his official instructions on 5 May 1845.

=== Ships, provisions and personnel ===
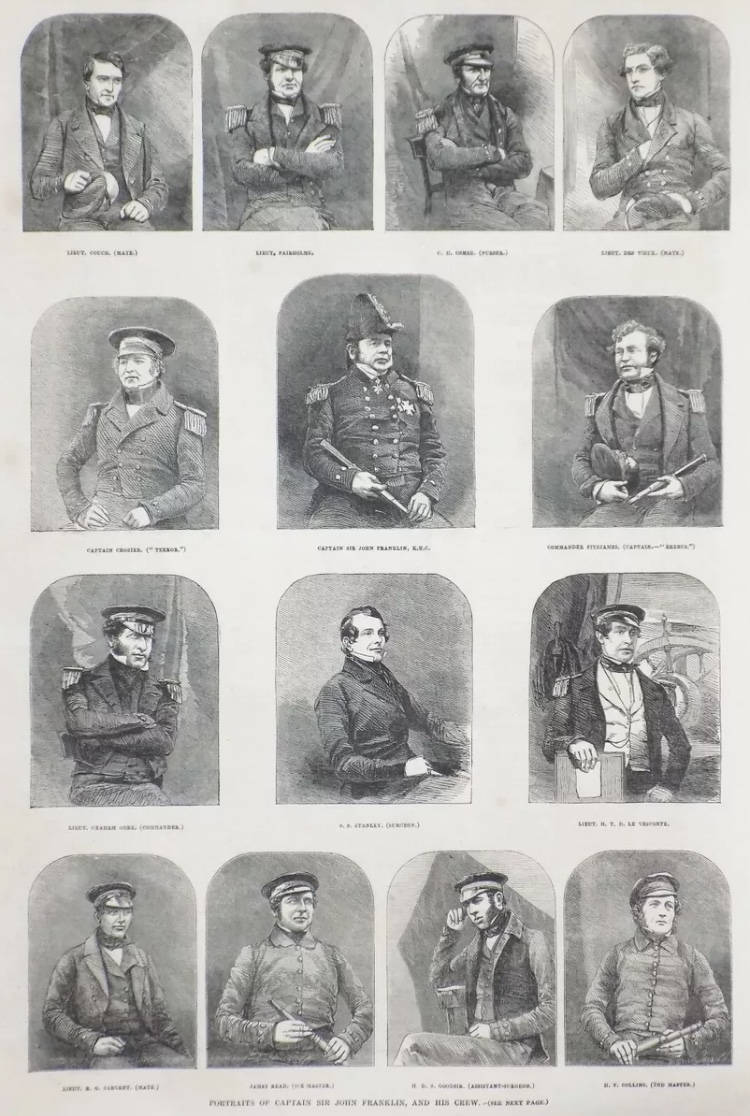
Erebus officers. Top row left to right: Lt. Edward Couch (mate); James Walter Fairholme; Charles Hamilton Osmer (purser); Charles Frederick Des Voeux (2nd mate). 2nd row from top Left to right: Francis Crozier (HMS Terror); Sir John Franklin; James Fitzjames. 3rd row from top left to right: Graham Gore (commander); Stephen Samuel Stanley (surgeon); 2nd Lt. Henry Thomas Dundas Le Vesconte. Bottom row left to right: Robert Orme Sergeant (1st mate); James Reid (master); Harry Duncan Goodsir (assistant surgeon); Henry Foster Collins (2nd master), sketches from daguerreotypes by Richard Beard – The Illustrated London News (1845)

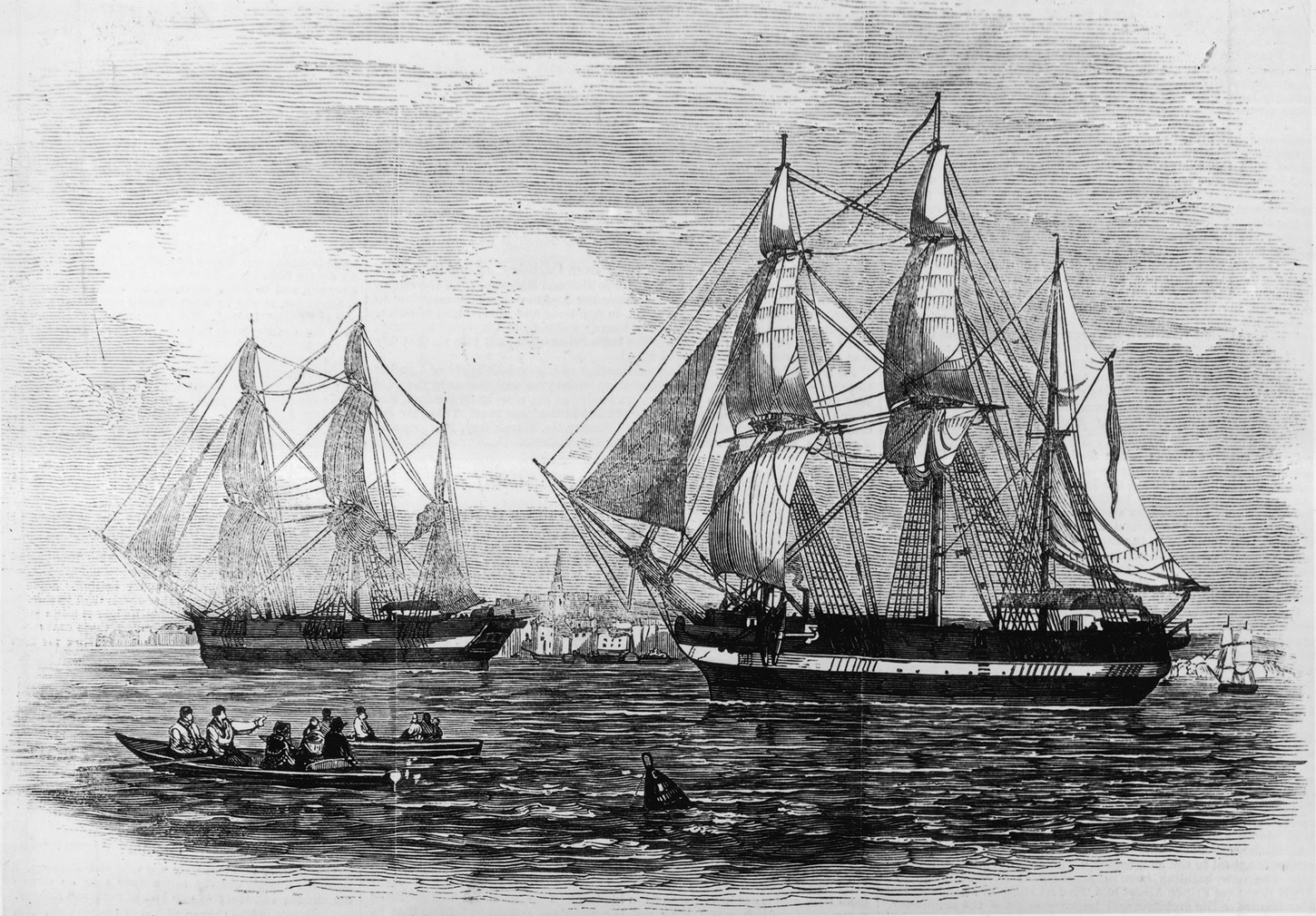
Engraving of HMS Erebus and HMS Terror departing for the Arctic in 1845

Erebus (378 tons bm) and Terror (331 tons bm) were sturdily built and well equipped, including with several recent inventions. Steam engines were fitted, driving a single screw propeller in each vessel; these engines were converted former locomotives from the London & Croydon Railway. The ships could make 7.4 km/h (4.0 kn) on steam power, or travel under wind power to reach higher speeds and/or save fuel.

Other advanced technology in the ships included reinforced bows constructed of heavy beams and iron plates, an internal steam heating system for the comfort of the crew in polar conditions, and a system of iron wells that allowed the screw propellers and iron rudders to be withdrawn into the hull to protect them from damage. The ships also carried libraries of more than 1,000 books and three years' supply of food, which included tinned soup and vegetables, salt-cured meat, pemmican, and several live cattle. The tinned food was supplied from a provisioner, Stephen Goldner, who was awarded the contract on 1 April 1845, a mere seven weeks before Franklin set sail. Goldner worked frantically on the large order of 8,000 tins. The haste required affected quality control of some of the tins, which were later found to have lead soldering that was "thick and sloppily done, and dripped like melted candle wax down the inside surface".

Most of the crew were English, many from Northern England, with smaller numbers of Irish, Welsh and Scottish members. Two of the sailors were not born in the British Isles: Charles Johnson was from Halifax, Nova Scotia, Canada, and Henry Lloyd was from Kristiansand, Norway. The only officers with experience of the Arctic were Franklin, Crozier, Erebus First Lieutenant Graham Gore, Terror assistant surgeon Alexander McDonald, and the two ice-masters, James Reid (Erebus) and Thomas Blanky (Terror).

== Outward journey and loss ==
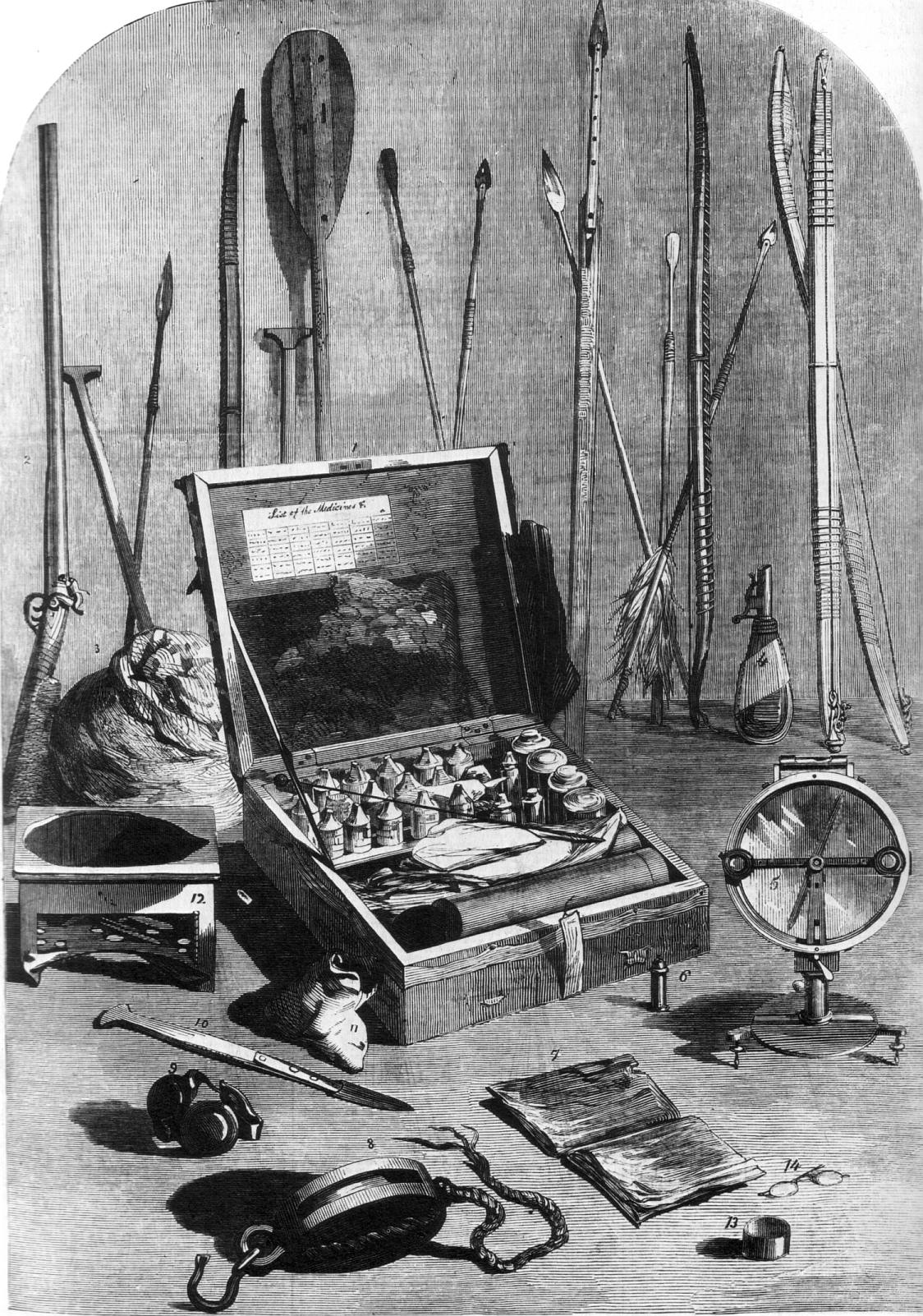
Relics of the Franklin expedition found in 1857 by McClintock

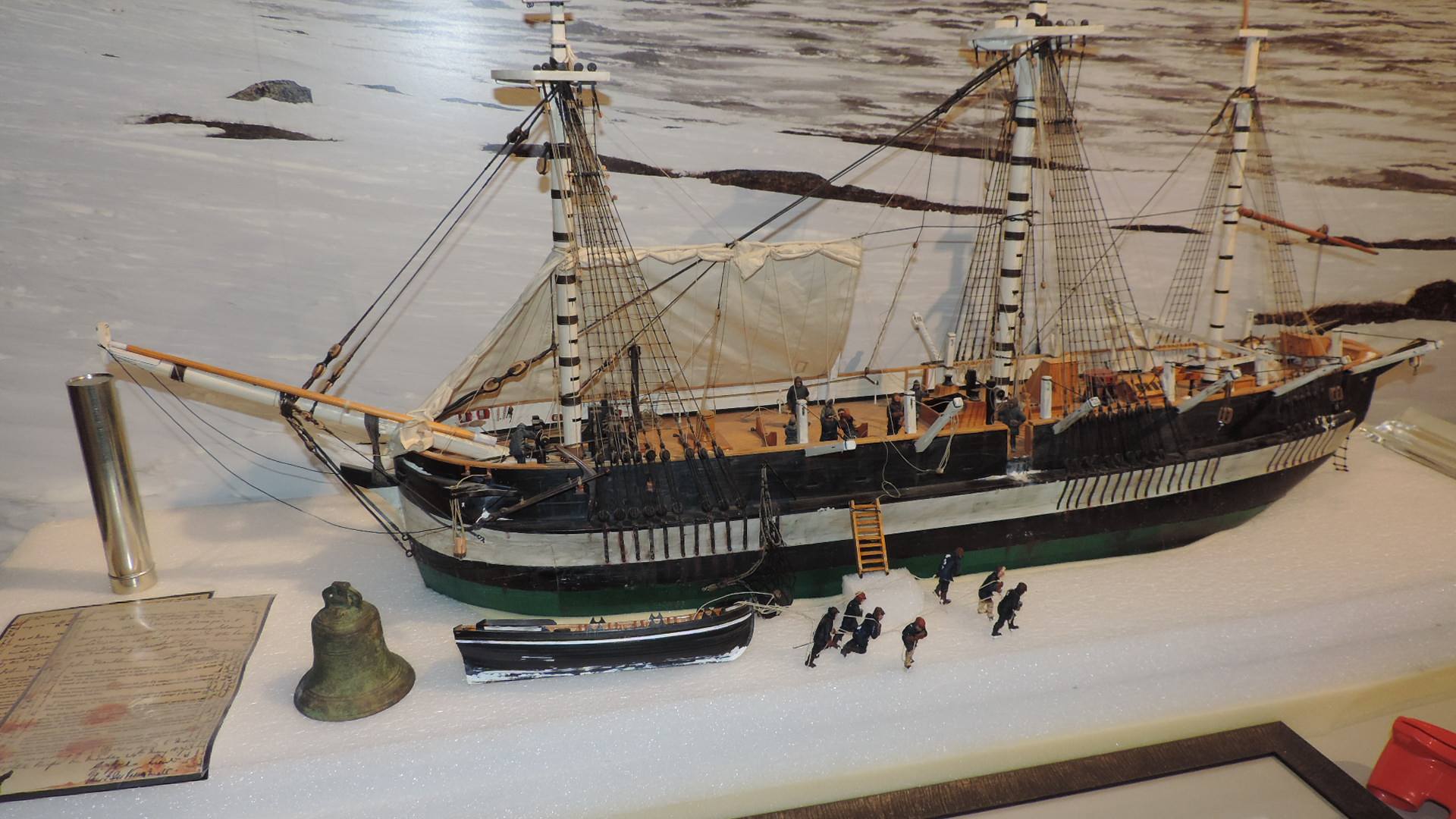
Model of Erebus trapped in the ice, Nattilik Heritage Centre, Gjoa Haven, Nunavut

The expedition set sail from Greenhithe, Kent, on the morning of 19 May 1845, with a crew of 24 officers and 110 men. The ships stopped briefly to take aboard fresh water in Stromness, Orkney Islands, in northern Scotland. From there they sailed to Greenland with HMS Rattler and a transport ship, Barretto Junior; the passage to Greenland took 30 days.

At the Whalefish Islands in Disko Bay, on the west coast of Greenland, ten oxen carried on Barretto Junior were slaughtered for fresh meat which was transferred to Erebus and Terror. Crew members then wrote their last letters home, which recorded that Franklin had banned swearing and drunkenness. Five men were discharged due to sickness and sent home on Rattler and Barretto Junior, reducing the final crew to 129 men. In late July 1845 the whalers Prince of Wales (Captain Dannett) and Enterprise (Captain Robert Martin) encountered Terror and Erebus in Baffin Bay, where they were waiting for good conditions to cross to Lancaster Sound. The expedition was never seen again by Europeans.

Only limited information is available for subsequent events, pieced together over the next 150 years by other expeditions, explorers, scientists and interviews with Inuit. The only first-hand information on the expedition's progress is the two-part Victory Point Note found in the aftermath on King William Island. Franklin's men spent the winter of 1845–46 on Beechey Island, where three crew members died and were buried. After travelling down Peel Sound through the summer of 1846, Terror and Erebus became trapped in ice off King William Island in September 1846 and are thought never to have sailed again. According to the second part of the Victory Point Note dated 25 April 1848 and signed by Fitzjames and Crozier, the crew had wintered off King William Island in 1846–47 and 1847–48 and Franklin had died on 11 June 1847. The remaining crew had abandoned the ships and planned to walk over the island and across the sea ice towards the Back River on the Canadian mainland, beginning on 26 April 1848. In addition to Franklin, eight further officers and 15 men had also died by this point. The Victory Point Note is the last known communication of the expedition.

From archaeological finds it is believed that all of the remaining crew died on the subsequent 400 km (250 mi) long march to Back River, most on the island. Thirty or forty men reached the northern coast of the mainland before dying, still hundreds of miles from the nearest outpost of Western civilisation.

=== Victory Point note ===
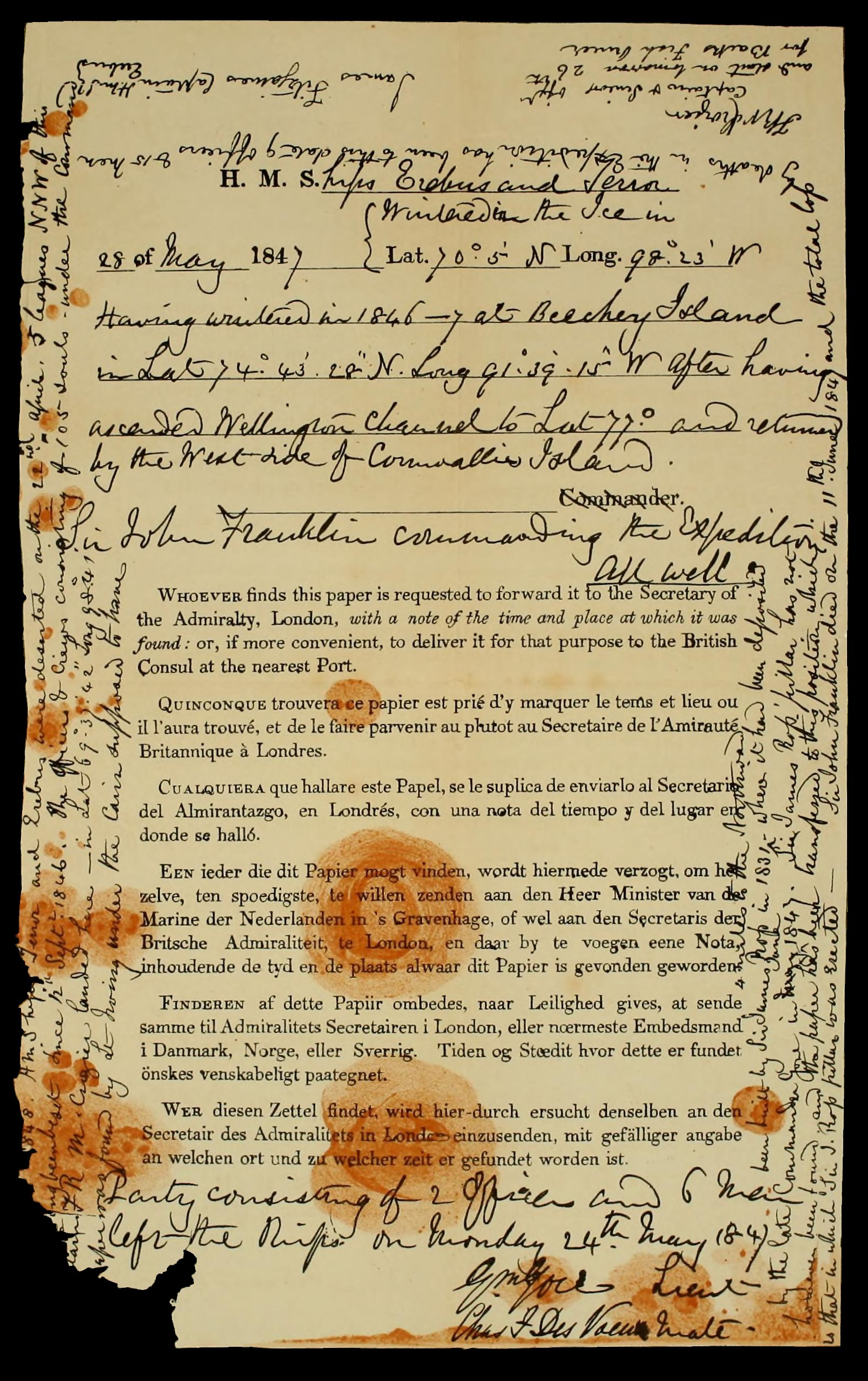
The Victory Point note

The Victory Point note was found eleven years later in May 1859 by William Hobson (lieutenant on the McClintock Arctic expedition) placed in a cairn on the north-western coast of King William Island. It consists of two parts written on a pre-printed Admiralty form. The first part was written after the first overwintering off King William Island in 1847 and the second part was added one year later. From the second part it can be inferred that the document was first deposited in a different cairn previously erected by James Clark Ross in 1830 during John Ross's Second Arctic expedition – at a location Ross named Victory Point.

The first message is written in the body of the form and dates from 28 May 1847.

28 of May 1847

H.M.S.hips Erebus and Terror Wintered in the Ice in Lat. 70°5'N Long. 98°23'W Having wintered in 1846-7 (Note: The date given is wrong, as Franklin wintered one year earlier at Beechey Island.) at Beechey Island in Lat 74°43'28"N Long 91°39'15"W

After having ascended Wellington Channel to Lat 77° and returned by the West side of Cornwallis Island.

Sir John Franklin commanding the Expedition.

All well

Party consisting of 2 Officers and 6 Men left the ships on Monday 24th May 1847.

[signed] Gm. Gore, Lieut.

[signed] Chas. F. DesVoeux, Mate

The second and final part is written largely on the margins of the form owing to a lack of remaining space on the document. It was presumably written on 25 April 1848.

25th April 1848

HMShips Terror and Erebus were deserted on the 22nd April 5 leagues NNW of this having been beset since 12th Sept 1846.

The officers and crews consisting of 105 souls under the command of Captain F. R. M. Crozier landed here—in Lat. 69°37'42" Long. 98°41'

This paper was found by Lt. Irving under the cairn supposed to have been built by Sir James Ross in 1831—4 miles to the Northward—where it had been deposited by the late Commander Gore in May June 1847.

Sir James Ross' pillar has not however been found and the paper has been transferred to this position which is that in which Sir J. Ross' pillar was erected.

Sir John Franklin died on the 11th of June 1847 and the total loss by deaths in the Expedition has been to this date 9 officers and 15 men.

(Signed) F. R. M. Crozier Captain & Senior Offr

And start on tomorrow 26th for Backs Fish River

(Signed) James Fitzjames Captain HMS Erebus

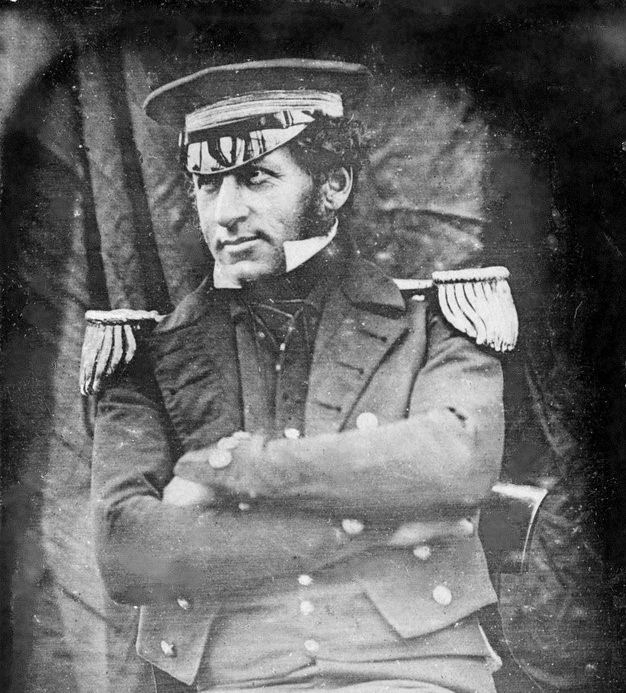
Lieutenant Graham Gore, who alongside Charles Frederick Des Voeux signed and deposited the Victory Point Note in May 1847

In 1859 Hobson found a second document using the same Admiralty form containing an almost identical duplicate of the first message from 1847 in a cairn a few miles southwest at Gore Point. This document did not contain the second message. From the handwriting it is assumed that all messages were written by Fitzjames. As he did not take part in the landing party that deposited the notes originally in 1847, it is inferred that both documents were originally filled in by Fitzjames on board the ships, with Lieutenant Graham Gore and Mate Charles Frederick Des Voeux adding their signatures as members of the landing party. This is further supported by the fact that both documents contain the same factual errors – namely the wrong date of the wintering on Beechey Island. In 1848, after the abandonment of the ships and subsequent recovery of the document from the Victory Point cairn, Fitzjames added the second message signed by him and Crozier and deposited the note in the cairn found by Hobson eleven years later.

== 19th century expeditions ==
=== Early searches ===
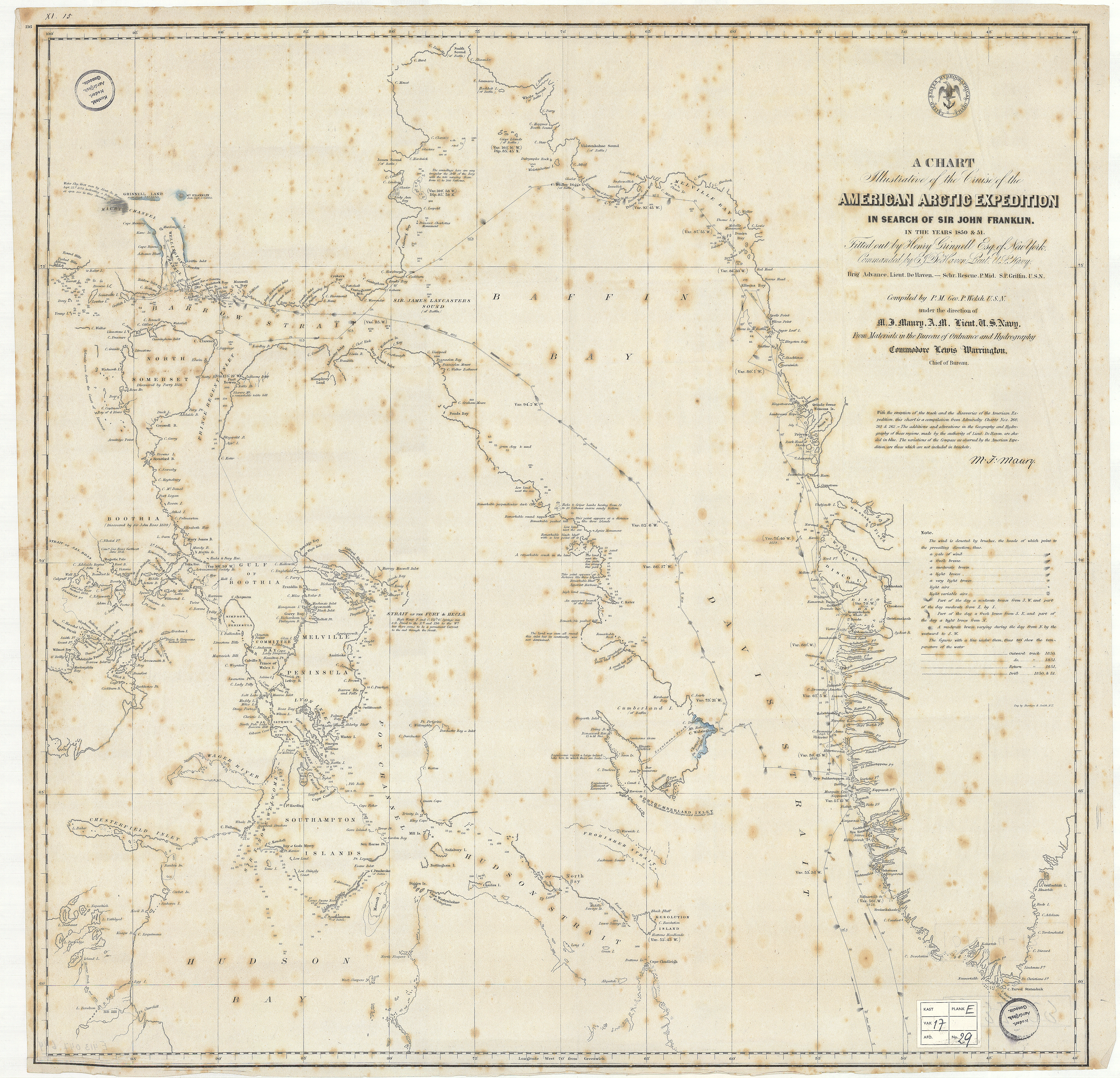
Searches in 1850–1851

After two years had passed with no word from Franklin, public concern grew and Jane, Lady Franklin, as well as members of Parliament and British newspapers, urged the Admiralty to send a search party. Although the Admiralty said it did not feel any reason to be alarmed, it responded by developing a three-pronged plan which in the spring of 1848 sent an overland rescue party, led by John Richardson and John Rae, down the Mackenzie River to the Canadian Arctic coast.

Two expeditions by sea were also launched – one, led by James Clark Ross, entering the Canadian Arctic archipelago through Lancaster Sound and the other, commanded by Henry Kellett, entering from the Pacific. In addition, the Admiralty offered a reward of £20,000 (equivalent to £2,100,000 in 2025) "to any Party or Parties, of any country, who shall render assistance to the crews of the Discovery Ships under the command of Sir John Franklin". When the three-pronged effort failed, British national concern and interest in the Arctic increased until "finding Franklin became nothing less than a crusade." Ballads such as "Lady Franklin's Lament", commemorating Lady Franklin's search for her lost husband, became popular.

Many joined the search. In 1850, eleven British and two American ships cruised the Canadian Arctic, including the Breadalbane and her sister ship HMS Phoenix. Several converged off the east coast of Beechey Island, where the first relics of the expedition were found, including remnants of a winter camp from 1845 to 1846. Robert Goodsir, surgeon on the brig Lady Franklin, found the graves of John Torrington, John Hartnell and William Braine. No messages from the Franklin expedition were found at this site.

In 1852 Edward Belcher was given command of the government Arctic expedition in search of Franklin. It was unsuccessful; Belcher's inability to render himself popular with his subordinates was peculiarly unfortunate on an Arctic voyage and he was not wholly suited to commanding vessels among ice. Four of the five ships (HMS Resolute, Pioneer, Assistance and Intrepid) were abandoned in pack ice, for which Belcher was court-martialled but acquitted.

One of these ships, HMS Resolute, was eventually recovered intact by an American whaler and returned to the United Kingdom. Timbers from the ship were later used to manufacture three desks, one of which, the Resolute desk, was presented by Queen Victoria to US President Rutherford B. Hayes; it has often been chosen by presidents for use in the Oval Office in the White House.

=== Overland searches ===
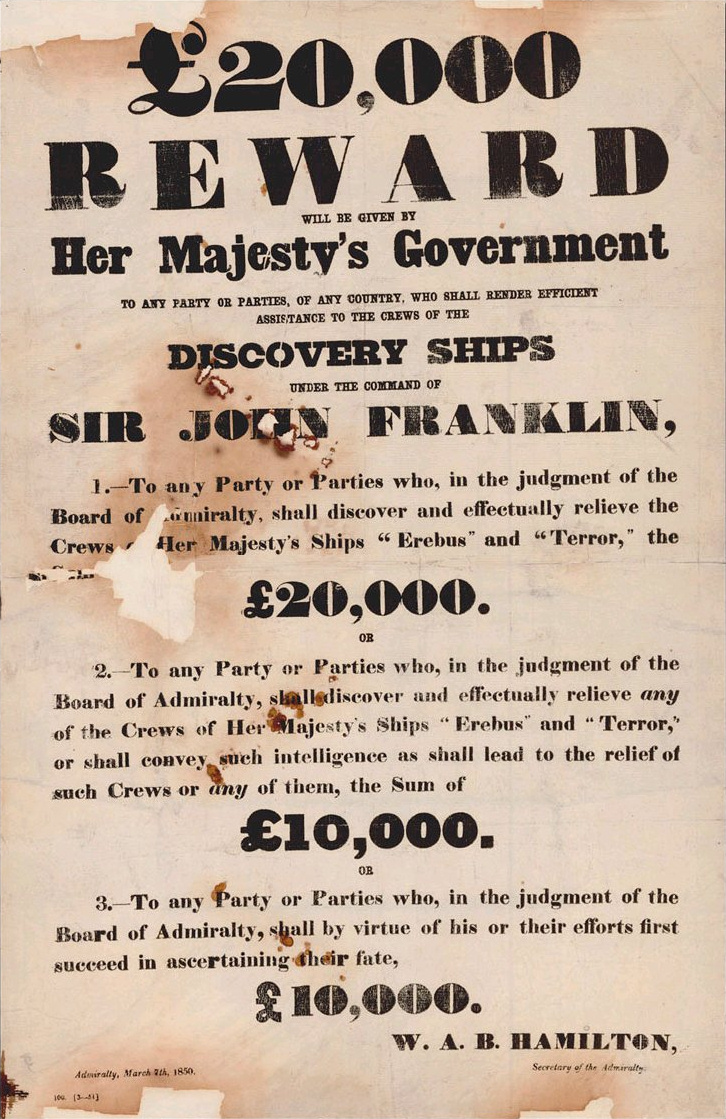
Poster offering a reward for help in finding the expedition

==== Rae and Anderson expeditions ====
In 1854, Rae, while surveying the Boothia Peninsula for the Hudson Bay Company, discovered further evidence of the expedition's fate. Rae met an Inuk near Pelly Bay (now Kugaaruk, Nunavut) on 21 April 1854, who told him of a party of 35 to 40 white men who had died of starvation near the mouth of the Back River. Other Inuit confirmed this story, which included reports of cannibalism among the dying sailors.

The Inuit showed Rae many objects that were identified as having belonged to members of the Franklin expedition. In particular, Rae bought from the Inuit several silver forks and spoons later identified as belonging to Franklin, Fitzjames, James Walter Fairholme, and Robert Orme Sargent of the Erebus, and Francis Rawdon Moira Crozier, captain of the Terror. Rae's report was sent to the Admiralty, which in October 1854 urged the HBC to send an expedition down the Back River to search for other signs of Franklin and his men.

Next were Chief Factor James Anderson and HBC employee James Stewart, who travelled north by canoe to the mouth of the Back River. In July 1855, a band of Inuit told them of a group of qallunaat (Inuktitut for "whites" or "Europeans", perhaps best translated as "foreigners") who had starved to death along the coast. In August, Anderson and Stewart found a piece of wood inscribed with "Erebus" and another that said "Mr. Stanley" (surgeon aboard Erebus) on Montreal Island in Chantrey Inlet, where the Back River meets the sea.

Despite the findings of Rae and Anderson, the Admiralty did not plan another search of its own. The Royal Navy officially labelled the crew deceased in service on 31 March 1854. Lady Franklin, failing to convince the government to fund another search, personally commissioned one more expedition under Francis Leopold McClintock. The expedition ship, the steam schooner Fox, bought via public subscription, sailed from Aberdeen on 2 July 1857.

==== Hobson expedition ====
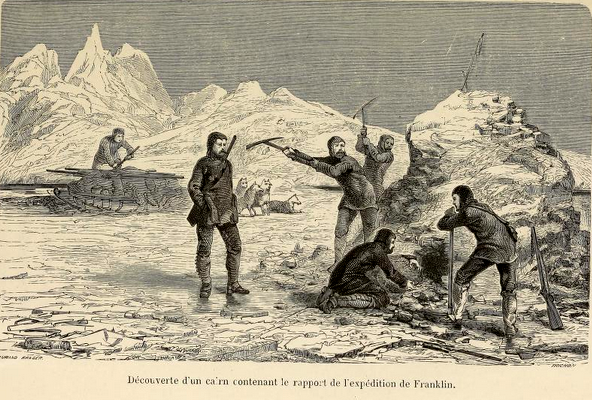
William Hobson and his men finding the cairn with the "Victory Point" note, Back Bay, King William Island, May 1859

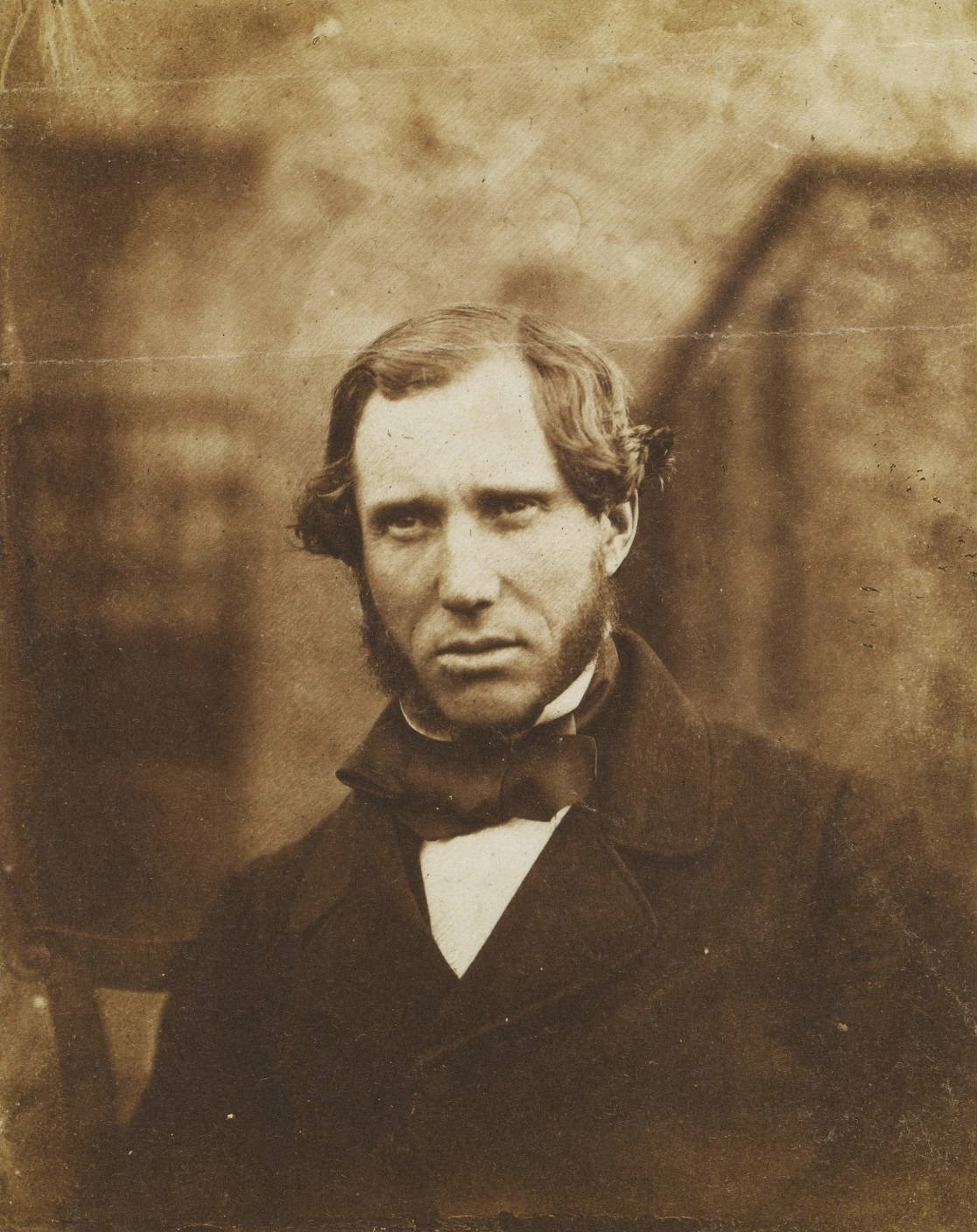
3d Lt John Irving, HMS Terror

In April 1859, sled parties set out from Fox to search on King William Island. On 5 May, the party led by Lieutenant William Hobson discovered the Victory Point Note, which detailed the abandonment of Erebus and Terror, death of Franklin and other crew members, and the decision by the survivors to march south to the mainland. On the western extreme of King William Island, Hobson also discovered a lifeboat containing two human skeletons and relics from the Franklin expedition. In the boat was a large amount of abandoned equipment, including boots, silk handkerchiefs, scented soap, sponges, slippers, hair combs and many books, among them a copy of The Vicar of Wakefield by Oliver Goldsmith.

==== McClintock expedition ====
Francis Leopold McClintock's expedition, commissioned by Lady Franklin, surveyed King William Island in 1857.

On the island's southern coast, McClintock's searchers found another skeleton. Still clothed, it was searched, and some papers were found, including a seaman's certificate for Chief Petty Officer Harry Peglar of Terror. It was thought that the body was that of Thomas Armitage, gun-room steward on Terror and a shipmate of Peglar, whose papers he carried. However, a later comparison of the skeleton's DNA with various descendants of Terror crew showed it to actually be Peglar. McClintock himself took testimony from the Inuit about the expedition's disastrous end.

==== Hall expeditions ====
Two expeditions between 1860 and 1869 by Charles Francis Hall, who lived among the Inuit near Frobisher Bay on Baffin Island and later at Repulse Bay on the Canadian mainland, found camps, graves and relics on the southern coast of King William Island, but he believed none of the Franklin survivors would be found among the Inuit.

Hall became acquainted with an Inuk man from Pelly Bay named Sŭ-pung-er. The two met first in 1866 where Hall conducted extensive interviews with Sŭ-pung-er. They met again on another expedition in 1869. Sŭ-pung-er described a vault to Hall created by members of the Franklin expedition marked by a wooden pillar in the ground and containing artefacts. A drawing of the vault's appearance was provided as well as a wooden model of the pillar which was broken off at the top at the time of Sŭ-pung-er's first visit and which is speculated to have been the remains of a wooden cross. Hall took the model together with a collection of other artefacts found on King William Island. It was handed over to the Smithsonian Institution and is currently part of the collection of the Smithsonian Museum of American History in Washington D.C. The actual vault that Hall believed to be the burial site of one of the higher officers of the Franklin expedition, possibly Franklin himself, has not been located.

The relevance and even actual existence of the vault has been doubted as Sŭ-pung-er's reliability was questioned even at the time of the expedition and he described the contents of the vault as bones, a knife, and dirt. Sŭ-pung-er and his uncle salvaged the wooden pillar for its wood, making the identification of the site which was likely built to be visible from the sea difficult.

In 1869, local Inuit took Hall to a shallow grave on the island containing well-preserved skeletal remains and fragments of clothing. These remains were taken to England and interred beneath the Franklin Memorial at Greenwich Old Royal Naval College, London.

The eminent biologist Thomas Henry Huxley examined the remains and concluded that they belonged to Henry Thomas Dundas Le Vesconte, second lieutenant on Erebus. An examination in 2009 suggested that these were actually the remains of Harry Goodsir, assistant surgeon on Erebus. Although Hall concluded that all of the Franklin crew were dead, he believed that the official expedition records would yet be found under a stone cairn. With the assistance of his guides Ipirvik and Taqulittuq, Hall gathered hundreds of pages of Inuit testimony.

Among these materials were accounts of visits to Franklin's ships, and an encounter with a party of white men on the southern coast of King William Island near Washington Bay. In the 1990s, this testimony was extensively researched by David C. Woodman and was the basis of two books, Unravelling the Franklin Mystery (1992) and Strangers Among Us (1995), in which he reconstructs the final months of the expedition. Woodman's narrative challenged existing theories that the survivors all perished over the remainder of 1848 as they marched south from Victory Point, arguing instead that Inuit accounts point strongly to most of the 105 survivors cited by Crozier in his final note actually surviving past 1848, re-manning at least one of the ships and managing to sail it down along the coast of King William Island before it sank, with some crew members surviving as late as 1851.

==== Schwatka expedition ====
The hope of finding other additional expedition records led Lieutenant Frederick Schwatka of the United States Army to organise an expedition to King William Island between 1878 and 1880. Travelling to Hudson Bay on the schooner Eothen, Schwatka, assembling a team that included Inuit who had assisted Hall, continued north by foot and dog sled, interviewing Inuit, visiting known or likely sites of Franklin expedition remains, and wintering on the island. Although Schwatka failed to find the hoped-for papers, in a speech at a dinner given in his honour by the American Geographical Society in 1880, he said that his expedition had made "the longest sledge journey ever made both in regard to time and distance" of eleven months and four days and 4,360 km (2,710 mi), that it was the first Arctic expedition on which the whites relied entirely on the same diet as the Inuit, and that it established the loss of the Franklin records "beyond all reasonable doubt". Schwatka was successful in locating the remains of one of Franklin's men, identified by personal effects as John Irving, third lieutenant aboard Terror. Schwatka had Irving's remains returned to Scotland, where they were buried with full honours at Dean Cemetery in Edinburgh on 7 January 1881.

The Schwatka expedition found no remnants of the Franklin expedition south of a place now known as Starvation Cove on the Adelaide Peninsula. This was about 64 km (40 mi) north of Crozier's stated goal, the Back River, and several hundred miles away from the nearest Western outpost, on the Great Slave Lake. Woodman wrote of Inuit reports that between 1852 and 1858 Crozier and one other expedition member were seen in the Baker Lake area, about 400 km (250 mi) to the south, where in 1948 Farley Mowat found "a very ancient cairn, not of normal Eskimo construction" inside which were shreds of a hardwood box with dovetail joints. Woodman was unable to track down the origin of these Inuit reports, and the builder or origins of the cairn found by Mowat are unknown.

== Modern expeditions ==
=== King William Island excavations (1981–1982) ===
In June 1981, Owen Beattie, a professor of anthropology at the University of Alberta, began the 1845–1848 Franklin Expedition Forensic Anthropology Project (FEFAP) when he and his team of researchers and field assistants travelled from Edmonton to King William Island, traversing the island's western coast as Franklin's men did 132 years before. FEFAP hoped to find artefacts and skeletal remains in order to use modern forensics to establish identities and causes of death among the lost 129 crewmembers.

Although the trek found archaeological artefacts related to 19th-century Europeans and undisturbed disarticulated human remains, Beattie was disappointed that more remains were not found. Examining the bones of Franklin crewmen, he noted areas of pitting and scaling often found in cases of vitamin C deficiency, the cause of scurvy. After returning to Edmonton, he compared notes from the survey with James Savelle, an Arctic archaeologist, and noticed skeletal patterns suggesting cannibalism. Seeking information about the Franklin crew's health and diet, he sent bone samples to the Alberta Soil and Feed Testing Laboratory for trace element analysis and assembled another team to visit King William Island. The analysis would find an unexpected level of 226 parts per million (ppm) of lead in the crewman's bones, which was ten times higher than the control samples, taken from Inuit skeletons from the same geographic area, of 26–36 ppm.

In June 1982, a team made up of Beattie and three students (Walt Kowall, a graduate student in anthropology at the University of Alberta; Arne Carlson, an archaeology and geography student from Simon Fraser University in British Columbia; and Arsien Tungilik, an Inuk student and field assistant) was flown to the west coast of King William Island where they retraced some of the steps of McClintock in 1859 and Schwatka in 1878–79. Discoveries during this expedition included the remains of between 6 and 14 men in the vicinity of McClintock's "boat place" and artefacts including a complete boot sole fitted with makeshift cleats for better traction.

=== Beechey Island excavations and exhumations (1984–1986) ===
After returning to Edmonton in 1982 and learning of the lead level findings from the 1981 expedition, Beattie struggled to find a cause. Possibilities included the lead solder used to seal the expedition's food tins, other food containers lined with lead foil, food colouring, tobacco products, pewter tableware, and lead-wicked candles. He came to suspect that the problems of lead poisoning compounded by the effects of scurvy could have been lethal for the Franklin crew. Because skeletal lead might reflect lifetime exposure rather than exposure limited to the voyage, Beattie's theory could be tested only by forensic examination of preserved soft tissue as opposed to bone. Beattie decided to examine the graves of the buried crewmen on Beechey Island.

After obtaining legal permission, Beattie's team visited Beechey Island in August 1984 to perform autopsies on the three crewmen buried there. They started with John Torrington, the first crew member to die. After completing Torrington's autopsy and exhuming and briefly examining the body of John Hartnell, the team, pressed for time and threatened by weather, returned to Edmonton with tissue and bone samples. Trace element analysis of Torrington's bones and hair indicated that the crewman "would have suffered severe mental and physical problems caused by lead poisoning". Although the autopsy indicated that pneumonia had been the ultimate cause of the crewman's death, lead poisoning was cited as a contributing factor.

During the expedition, the team visited a place about 1 km (0.62 mi) north of the gravesite to examine fragments of hundreds of food tins discarded by Franklin's men. Beattie noted that the seams were poorly soldered with lead, which had likely come in direct contact with the food. The release of findings from the 1984 expedition and the photo of Torrington, a 138-year-old corpse well preserved by Arctic permafrost, led to wide media coverage and renewed interest in the Franklin expedition.

Subsequent research has suggested that another potential source for the lead may have been the ships' distilled water systems rather than the tinned food. K. T. H. Farrer argued that "it is impossible to see how one could ingest from the canned food the amount of lead, 3.3 mg per day over eight months, required to raise the PbB to the level 80 μg/dL at which symptoms of lead poisoning begin to appear in adults and the suggestion that bone lead in adults could be 'swamped' by lead ingested from food over a period of a few months, or even three years, seems scarcely tenable." In addition, tinned food was in widespread use within the Royal Navy at that time and its use did not lead to any significant increase in lead poisoning elsewhere.

Uniquely for this expedition, the ships were fitted with converted railway locomotive engines for auxiliary propulsion which required an estimated one tonne of fresh water per hour when steaming. It is highly probable that it was for this reason that the ships were fitted with a unique desalination system which, given the materials in use at the time, would have produced large quantities of water with a very high lead content. William Battersby has argued that this is a much more likely source for the high levels of lead observed in the remains of expedition members than the tinned food.

A further survey of the graves was undertaken in 1986. A camera crew filmed the procedure, shown in a 1988 episode of the American programme Nova. Under difficult field conditions, Derek Notman, a radiologist and medical doctor from the University of Minnesota, and radiology technician Larry Anderson took many X-rays of the crewmen prior to autopsy. Barbara Schweger, an Arctic clothing specialist, and Roger Amy, a pathologist, assisted in the investigation.

Beattie and his team had noticed that someone else had attempted to exhume Hartnell. In the effort, a pickaxe had damaged the wooden lid of his coffin, and the coffin plaque was missing. Research in Edmonton later showed that Sir Edward Belcher, commander of one of the Franklin rescue expeditions, had ordered the exhumation of Hartnell in October 1852, but was thwarted by the permafrost. One month later, Edward A. Inglefield, commander of another rescue expedition, succeeded with the exhumation and removed the coffin's plaque.

Unlike Hartnell's grave, the grave of Private William Braine was largely intact. When he was exhumed, the survey team saw signs that his burial had been hasty. His arms, body and head had not been positioned carefully in the coffin, and one of his undershirts had been put on backwards. The coffin seemed too small for him; its lid had pressed down on his nose. A large copper plaque with his name and other personal data punched into it adorned his coffin lid.

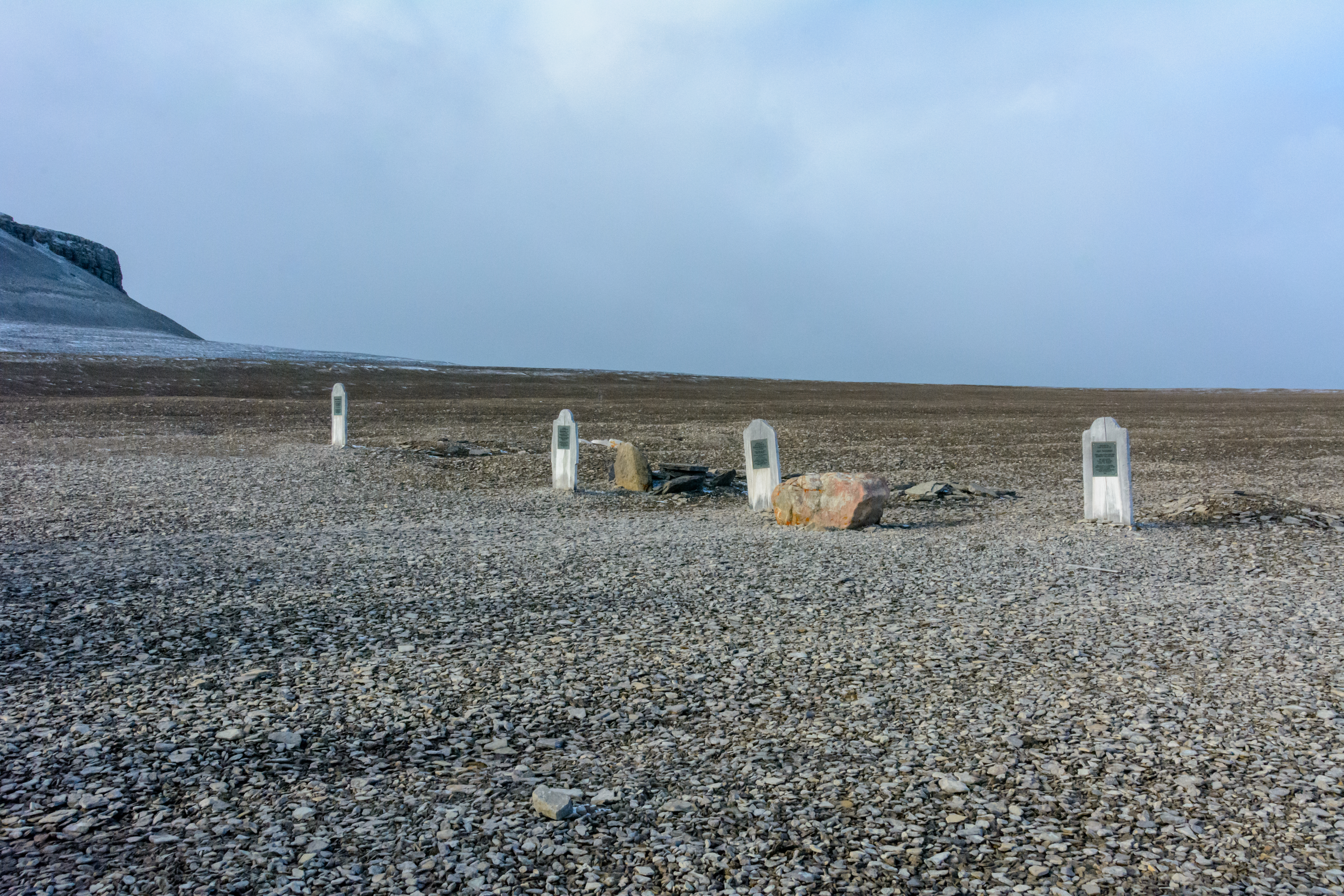
The four graves at Franklin Camp near the harbour on Beechey Island, Nunavut, Canada

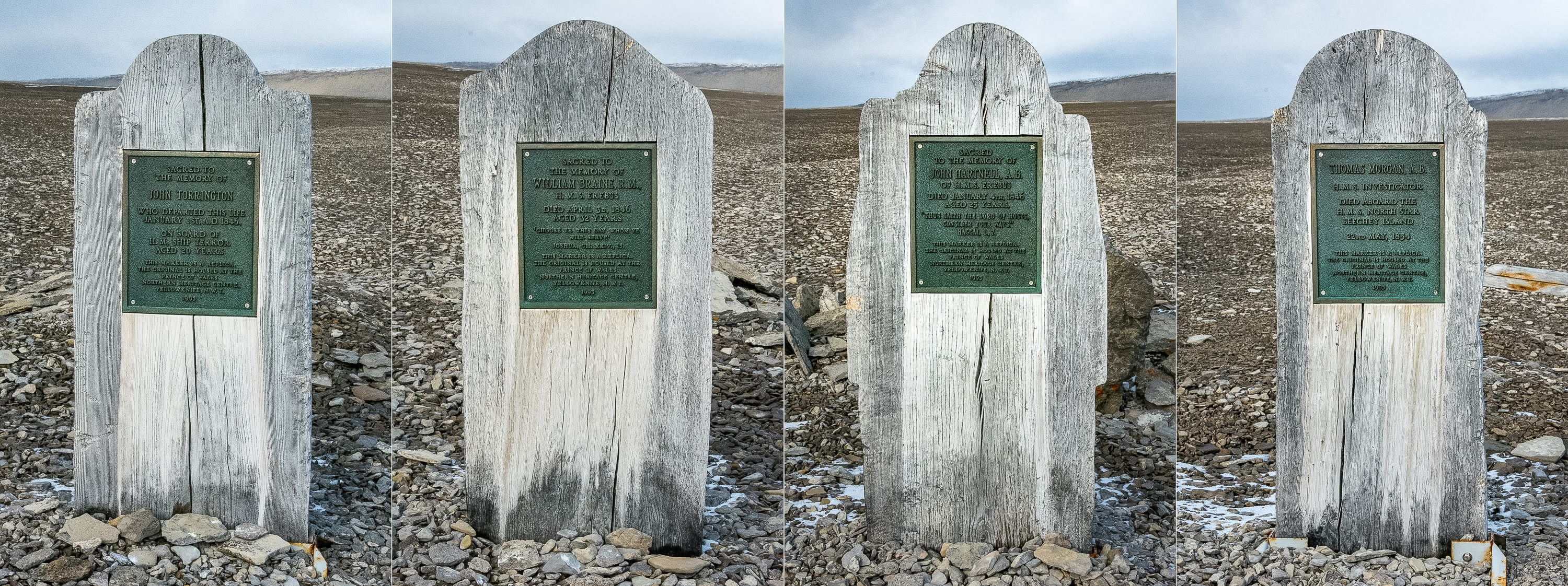
(L–R) Three grave stones commemorate John Torrington, William Braine and John Hartnell of the Franklin Expedition. A fourth headstone marks the grave of a sailor named Thomas Morgan who came later in a Franklin search expedition and died at the camp.

Sites of remains of Franklin's Lost Expedition

=== NgLj-2 excavations (1992) ===
In 1992, Franklin scholar Barry Ranford and his colleague, Mike Yarascavitch, discovered human skeletal remains and artefacts of what they suspected to be some of the lost crewmen of the expedition. The site matches the physical description of McClintock's "boat place". In 1993, a team of archaeologists and forensic anthropologists returned to the site, which they referenced as "NgLj-2", on the western shores of King William Island, to excavate these remains. These excavations uncovered nearly 400 bones and bone fragments, and physical artefacts ranging from pieces of clay pipes to buttons and brass fittings. Examination of these bones by Anne Keenleyside, the expedition's forensic scientist, showed elevated levels of lead and many cut-marks "consistent with de-fleshing". On the basis of this expedition, it has become generally accepted that at least some of Franklin's men resorted to cannibalism in their final distress.

A study published in the International Journal of Osteoarchaeology in 2015 concluded that in addition to the de-fleshing of bones, thirty-five "bones had signs of breakage and 'pot polishing', which occurs when the ends of bones heated in boiling water rub against the cooking pot they are placed in", which "typically occurs in the end stage of cannibalism, when starving people extract the marrow to eke out the last bit of calories and nutrition they can."

Later reviews of the data concluded that NgLj-2, although in the vicinity of McClintock's boat place, was likely a different site and that NgLj-2 and NgLj-3, both locations at Erebus bay documented by the 1992 expedition, were likely separate sites where boats on sleds ended up after the Franklin expedition's crew tried to reach Back River, while NgLj-1 was likely not the location of a boat due to the small numbers of fragments found there. Stanton and Park (2017) consider LgLj-3 to be identical with McClintock's boat place. The conclusion was supported by an analysis of buried human remains at LgLj-3 that the authors found to match the description of two bodies found by McClintock in the then-intact boat.

LgLj-8, another site documented in 1992, was classified as a place where artefacts from the Franklin expedition were likely brought to by Inuit who salvaged the equipment left by the Franklin expedition.

=== King William Island (1994–1995) ===
In 1994, Woodman organised and led a land search of the area from Collinson Inlet to (modern) Victory Point in search of the buried "vaults" spoken of in the testimony of the contemporary Inuk hunter Sŭ-pung-er. A ten-person team spent ten days in the search, sponsored by the Royal Canadian Geographical Society and filmed by the Canadian Broadcasting Corporation (CBC). No trace of the vaults was found.

In 1995, an expedition was jointly organised by Woodman, George Hobson and American adventurer Steven Trafton – with each party planning a separate search. Trafton's group travelled to the Clarence Islands to investigate Inuit stories of a "white man's cairn" there but found nothing. Hobson's party, accompanied by archaeologist Margaret Bertulli, investigated the "summer camp" found a few miles to the south of Cape Felix, where some minor Franklin relics were found. Woodman, with two companions, travelled south from Wall Bay to Victory Point and investigated all likely campsites along this coast, finding only some rusted cans at a previously unknown campsite near Cape Maria Louisa.

=== Wreck searches (1997–2013) ===
In 1997, a "Franklin 150" expedition was mounted by the Canadian film company Eco-Nova to use sonar to investigate more of the priority magnetic targets found in 1992. The senior archaeologist was Robert Grenier, assisted by Margaret Bertulli, and Woodman again acted as expedition historian and search coordinator. Operations were conducted from the Canadian Coast Guard icebreaker Laurier. Approximately 40 km^{2} (15 sq mi) were surveyed, without result, near Kirkwall Island. When detached parties found Franklin relics – primarily copper sheeting and small items – on the beaches of islets to the north of O'Reilly Island, the search was diverted to that area, but poor weather prevented significant survey work before the expedition ended. A documentary, Oceans of Mystery: Search for the Lost Fleet, was produced by Eco-Nova about this expedition.

Three expeditions were mounted by Woodman to continue the magnetometer mapping of the proposed wreck sites: a privately sponsored expedition in 2001, and the Irish-Canadian Franklin Search Expeditions of 2002 and 2004. These made use of sled-drawn magnetometers working on the sea ice and completed the unfinished survey of the northern (Kirkwall Island) search area in 2001, and the entire southern O'Reilly Island area in 2002 and 2004. All of the high-priority magnetic targets were identified by sonar through the ice as geological in origin. In 2002 and 2004, small Franklin artefacts and characteristic explorer tent sites were found on a small islet northeast of O'Reilly Island during shore searches.

In August 2008 a new search by Parks Canada was announced, to be led by Grenier. This search hoped to take advantage of the improved ice conditions, using side-scan sonar from a boat in open water. Grenier also hoped to draw from newly published Inuit testimony collected by oral historian Dorothy Harley Eber. Some of Eber's informants placed the location of one of Franklin's ships in the vicinity of the Royal Geographical Society Island, an area not searched by previous expeditions. The search was to also include local Inuk historian Louie Kamookak, who had found other significant remains of the expedition and would represent the indigenous culture.

HMS Investigator became icebound in 1853 while searching for Franklin's expedition and was subsequently abandoned. It was found in shallow water in Mercy Bay on 25 July 2010, along the northern coast of Banks Island in Canada's western Arctic. The Parks Canada team reported that it was in good shape, upright in about 11 m (36 ft) of water.

A new search was announced by Parks Canada in August 2013.

=== Victoria Strait Expedition: wreck of Erebus (2014) ===
Side-scan sonar images of Erebus at the bottom of Wilmot and Crampton Bay, September 2014

On 1 September 2014, a larger search by a Canadian team under the banner of the "Victoria Strait Expedition" found two items on Hat Island in the Queen Maud Gulf near King William Island: a wooden object, possibly a plug for a deck hawse, the iron pipe through which the ship's chain cable would descend into the chain locker below; and part of a boat-launching davit bearing the stamps of two Royal Navy broad arrows.

On 9 September 2014, the expedition announced that on 7 September it had located one of Franklin's two ships. The ship is preserved in good condition, with side-scan sonar picking up even the deck planking. The wreck lies in about 11 m (36 ft) of water at the bottom of Wilmot and Crampton Bay in the eastern part of Queen Maud Gulf, west of O'Reilly Island. On 1 October at the House of Commons, Canadian prime minister Stephen Harper confirmed the wreck was that of HMS Erebus. A documentary, Hunt for the Arctic Ghost Ship, was produced by Lion Television for Channel 4's Secret History series in 2015.

In September 2018, Parks Canada announced that Erebus had deteriorated significantly. "An upwards buoyant force acting on the decking combined with storm swell in relatively shallow water caused the displacement", according to a spokesperson. The underwater exploration in 2018 totalled only a day and a half due to weather and ice conditions and was to continue in 2019. Also in September 2018, a report provided specifics as to ownership of the ships and contents: the United Kingdom will own the first 65 artefacts brought up from Erebus, while the wreck of both ships and other artefacts will be jointly owned by Canada and the Inuit.

=== Arctic Research Foundation Expedition: wreck of Terror (2016) ===
On 12 September 2016, it was announced that the Arctic Research Foundation expedition had found the wreck of HMS Terror to the south of King William Island in Terror Bay, at 68°54′13″N 98°56′18″W at a depth of 24 m (79 ft), and in "pristine" condition.

In 2018, a team examined the wreck of Terror using a remotely operated underwater vehicle (ROV) that collected photos and video clips of the ship and a number of artefacts. The group concluded that Terror had not been left at anchor, since anchor cables were seen to be secured along the bulwarks.

== Scientific conclusions ==
=== Reasons for failure ===
The FEFAP field surveys, excavations and exhumations spanned more than ten years. The results of this study showed that the Beechey Island crew had most probably died of pneumonia and perhaps tuberculosis, which was suggested by the evidence of Pott disease discovered in Braine. Toxicological reports pointed to lead poisoning as a likely contributing factor. Blade cut marks found on bones from some of the crew were seen as signs of cannibalism. Evidence suggested that a combination of cold, starvation and disease including scurvy, pneumonia and tuberculosis, all made worse by lead poisoning, killed everyone in the Franklin expedition. It was also discovered that the cans of provisions mainly eaten by officers were soldered poorly, causing food to rot.

More recent chemical re-examination of bone and nail samples taken from Hartnell and other crew members has cast doubt on the role of lead poisoning. A 2013 study determined that the levels of lead present in the crew members' bones had been consistent during their lives, and that there was no isotopic difference between lead concentrated within older and younger bone materials. Had the crew been poisoned by lead from the solder used to seal the canned food or from the ships' water supplies, both the concentration of lead and its isotopic composition would have been expected to have "spiked" during their last few months. This interpretation was supported by a 2016 study that suggested the crew's ill health may in fact have been due to malnutrition, and specifically zinc deficiency, probably due to a lack of meat in their diet. This study used micro-X-ray fluorescence to map the levels of lead, copper and zinc in Hartnell's thumbnail over the final months of his life, and found that apart from during his last few weeks lead concentrations within Hartnell's body were within healthy limits. In contrast, levels of zinc were far lower than normal and indicated that Hartnell would have been suffering from chronic zinc deficiency, sufficient to have severely suppressed his immune system and left him highly vulnerable to a worsening of the tuberculosis with which he was already infected. In the last few weeks of his life, his illness would have caused his body to start breaking down bone, fat and muscle tissues, releasing lead previously stored there into his bloodstream and giving rise to the high lead levels noted in previous analysis of soft tissues and hair.

Franklin's chosen passage down the west side of King William Island took Erebus and Terror into "a ploughing train of ice ... [that] does not always clear during the short summers", whereas the route along the island's east coast regularly clears in summer and was later used by Roald Amundsen in his successful navigation of the Northwest Passage. The Franklin expedition, locked in ice for two winters in Victoria Strait, was naval in nature and therefore not well-equipped or trained for land travel. Some of the crewmembers heading south from Erebus and Terror hauled in many items not needed for Arctic survival. McClintock noted a large quantity of heavy goods in the lifeboat at the "boat place" and thought them "a mere accumulation of dead weight, of little use, and very likely to break down the strength of the sledge-crews". The winter of 1846–1847 was unusually harsh for its time, meaning the ship was completely stuck in ice for two successive winters.

The fact that the two ships wintered in the ice in a location about 20 km from the next shore has been highlighted as a major difference to other Arctic expeditions that did not experience the catastrophic mortality of the Franklin expedition. Over two winters, the crews relied almost exclusively on stored food and had little opportunity to hunt and fish. This kind of diet likely led to deficiencies not only of vitamin C but also of the then unknown thiamine which can lead to severe physical weakness.

=== Recent identification of human remains ===
In 2017, Douglas Stenton, an adjunct professor of anthropology at the University of Waterloo and former director of Nunavut's Department of Heritage and Culture, suggested that four sets of human remains found on King William Island could possibly be women. He initially suspected that DNA testing would not offer up anything more, but to his surprise they registered that there was no 'Y' chromosomal element to the DNA. Stenton acknowledged that women were known to have served in the Royal Navy in the 17th, 18th and early 19th centuries, but he also pointed out that it could be that the DNA had simply degraded as further tests proved ambiguous and he concluded the initial findings were "almost certainly incorrect".

In 1993, three bodies were found at site NgLj-3 near Erebus Bay. The remains had originally been found by McClintock's expedition in 1859, and were rediscovered and buried by Schwatka two decades later. In 2013, a team led by Stenton had the remains exhumed for DNA testing and forensic facial reconstruction. The team's report, published in Polar Journal in 2015, indicated that the reconstructions of the two intact skulls from the remains resembled Lieutenant Gore and Ice-Master Reid of the Erebus, but determined the remains could not have belonged to Gore, as the Victory Point note stated that Gore had died before the abandonment of the ships in April 1848.

In May 2021, one of the bodies was positively identified as that of Warrant Officer John Gregory, an engineer aboard Erebus. A genealogy team tracked down Gregory's great-great-great-grandson, Jonathan Gregory, residing in Port Elizabeth, South Africa, and confirmed the familial match through DNA testing.

In September 2024, researchers Douglas Stenton, Stephen Fratpietro, and Robert W. Park, from the University of Waterloo and Lakehead University, announced that they had positively identified a skeletal mandible as belonging to Captain James Fitzjames through DNA testing. An unbroken Y-chromosome DNA match was made from a living descendant of Fitzjames's great-grandfather James Gambier; the DNA donor, Nigel Gambier of Bury St Edmunds, is second cousin five times removed to Fitzjames. By doing genealogical research, historian Fabiënne Tetteroo determined that Nigel Gambier was an eligible match for Fitzjames. Tetteroo contacted Nigel Gambier and he agreed to provide the DNA sample that conclusively identified Fitzjames. Fitzjames' mandible shows signs of cut marks consistent with cannibalism.

In May 2026, four more sets of remains were identified by DNA testing. Three were found at Erebus Bay, and identified as being from Erebus: able seaman William Orren, ship's boy David Young, and officers' steward John Bridgens. The fourth, the skeleton found at Gladman Point by McClintock in 1859, was positively identified as Harry Peglar, Terror's captain of the foretop.

== Timeline ==
Year	Date	Event
1845	12 May	Expedition leaves Woolwich, England for Greenhithe.
1845		At Greenhithe, the crews are given a pay advance for their families.
1845	19 May	Expedition leaves Greenhithe with 134 men, a monkey (Jacko), a Newfoundland dog (Neptune), a cat, and several live cattle.
1845	26 May	Expedition passes Sheerness.
1845	31 May	Expedition docks at Stromness, Scotland. Cattle killed in a storm at sea are replaced, and some letters are sent. Sir John Franklin writes his wife that he has taken a great liking to Graham Gore, and that he has barely seen Francis Crozier due to rough weather.
1845	3 June	The ships depart Stromness.
1845	4 July	Expedition anchors at the Whalefish Islands, just off Disko Island, Greenland. Five men sick with tuberculosis are sent home, along with another batch of letters.
1845	12 July	Expedition leaves Greenland.
1845	26 July	Expedition sighted by whaling ships while awaiting passage into Lancaster Sound.
1845–1846		Expedition ascends Wellington Channel and returns by west side of Cornwallis Island.
1845–1846		Expedition winters on Beechey Island.
1846	1 January	John Torrington dies and is buried at Beechey Island.
1846	4 January	John Hartnell dies and is autopsied before being buried at Beechey Island.
1846	3 April	William Braine dies but is stored in the ship instead of buried immediately.
1846	c. 8 April	Braine is buried at Beechey Island after his body is gnawed on by ship rats.
1846		HMS Erebus and HMS Terror leave Beechey Island and sail down Peel Sound towards King William Island.
1846	12 September	Ships trapped in the ice off King William Island.
1846–1847		Expedition winters on King William Island.
1847	28 May	Six-man sledge party led by Lt. Graham Gore and Mate Charles Frederick Des Voeux leaves identical notes at Victory Point and Gore Point, both written by James Fitzjames and concluding "All well". They return without finding a message left by James Clark Ross in a cairn in 1831.
1847	11 June	Franklin dies, leaving Crozier in charge of the expedition. Fitzjames becomes captain of Erebus.
1847–1848		Preparations begin for an overland search for Franklin's expedition, led by Dr. John Rae and Sir John Richardson, while Thomas Edward Laws Moore performs a maritime search aboard HMS Plover. Franklin's expedition again winters off King William Island, after the ice fails to thaw in 1847.
1848		James Clark Ross begins a search for the expedition aboard the Investigator and Enterprise.
1848	22 April	Erebus and Terror are abandoned after one year and seven months trapped in the ice. Men set camp at Victory Point (later Crozier's Landing).
1848	25 April	Second note left by Fitzjames on the margins of a 1847 one found by Lt. John Irving: 24 men are dead, 9 of them officers including Franklin and Gore. Irving's role may imply Des Voeux was also dead or incapacitated. Ross's cairn was found destroyed and without message, possibly by Inuit. Crozier adds a footnote saying the 105 survivors plan to start marching south to the Back River on 26 April.
1848	July	Scheduled end of provisions. Many cans will be found unopened in the ships and outside.
1849		Richardson returns with no news of the Franklin expedition, as does James Clark Ross. Captain William Penny attempts a search aboard the Advice but is turned back by the ice.
1850		Charles Forsyth leads a brief search aboard the Prince Albert, returning with reports of Sir John's winter quarters. John Ross conducts a private search aboard the Felix and Mary without any news. They are joined by Horatio Austin's squadron, consisting of HMS Resolute, Assistance, Intrepid, and Pioneer. Captain Penny returns to the Arctic, leading Lady Franklin and Sophia in a renewed search. Edwin De Haven leads USS Advance and Rescue in the American-led Grinnell expedition. The McClure Arctic expedition headed by Robert McClure and Richard Collinson searches via the Bering Strait.
1850	7 March	The British government offers £20,000 to anyone assisting members of the Expedition and £10,000 for ascertaining its fate.
1850	19 August	Erasmus Ommanney of Horatio Austin's expedition locates the Franklin Expedition's camp on Beechey Island. Finding no messages, he searches north of the island and returns to Britain.
1851		Thomas Edward Laws Moore returns from his 1847 search without any news. William Kennedy leads another search aboard the Prince Albert, also without any news.
1852		Edward Belcher leads a squadron of five ships—Assistance, Resolute, Intrepid, Pioneer, and North Star—in search of the expedition.
1853		Continuing his overland search, Dr. John Rae encounters Inuit near the Back River carrying items from the expedition. He interviews the Inuit and purchases their items, learning that they had encountered Franklin's expedition in spring 1850 and that the expedition has died of hunger and cold, with some resorting to cannibalism. William Kennedy attempts another search, but his crew mutinies near Valparaíso. Elisha Kent Kane leads a second American search expedition aboard USS Advance.
1854		Robert McClure and Richard Collinson return from their Bering Strait search with no news of the expedition. Belcher also returns from his 1852 search with no information, having lost four of his five ships.
1854	31 March	The members of the expedition are officially declared dead and struck from the Navy List.
1854	July	Concluding his overland search, Dr. John Rae informs the Admiralty that Franklin's expedition succumbed to starvation and the elements, with some members resorting to cannibalism.
1854	23 October	Dr. Rae's report is leaked to the press on his return to England, causing great outcry and tarnishing Rae's reputation. The cannibalism is blamed on the Inuit and their testimony ignored for many years.
1859		Francis Leopold McClintock finds the 1847–48 messages in cairns, an abandoned boat, and a skeleton on Erebus Bay. The body is found with Peglar's diary, but thought to be a different man because of his uniform. Inuit tell McClintock that a ship wreck came ashore and was much salvaged, and another with many dead bodies inside sank abruptly and was little salvaged; the Inuit who ate from tins in the second ship became ill and several died.
1864–1869		Charles Francis Hall searches for survivors and interviews Inuit. He finds many items and a skeleton tentatively identified as Henry Thomas Dundas Le Vesconte, which he returns to Britain.
1875		Allen Young leads a search expedition aboard HMS Pandora, but is turned back by ice at Peel Sound.
1878–1880		Frederick Schwatka leads an overland search expedition, collects Inuit testimony, finds several items and buried remains, including the two boats at Erebus Bay. He repatriates one skeleton, later identified as John Irving.
1949		Human remains found near camp in Cape Felix, possibly from graves. A skull is taken and assigned to a 25-year-old white male.
1984–1986		Beechey Island graves opened by Owen Beattie's team, bodies examined and proposed to have suffered from lead poisoning.
1995		David Woodman publishes Strangers Among Us, a book on the Franklin Expedition that includes many notes from Hall and Inuit testimonies previously ignored.
2014	2 September	Wreck of Erebus found in Wilmot and Crampton Bay off Utjulik, corroborating Inuit testimony.
2016	3 September	Wreck of Terror found in Terror Bay.
2016	October	Evidence for cannibalism.
2021	August	Body found by McClintock in 1859 identified by DNA as John Gregory.
2024	November	Bones discovered at site NgLj-2 in 1993 identified by DNA as James Fitzjames.
2026	May	Remains discovered at sites NgLj-3, NgLj-2 and NgLj-1 between 2013 and 2018 identified by DNA as Subordinate Officers' Steward John Bridgens, Boy 1^{st} Class David Young and Able Seaman William Orren.

== Legacy ==
=== Historical ===
The most meaningful outcome of the Franklin expedition was the mapping of several thousand miles of hitherto unsurveyed coastline by expeditions searching for Franklin's lost ships and crew. As Richard Cyriax noted, "the loss of the expedition probably added much more [geographical] knowledge than its successful return would have done". At the same time, it largely quelled the Admiralty's appetite for Arctic exploration. There was a gap of many years before the Nares expedition and Sir George Nares' declaration there was "no thoroughfare" to the North Pole; his words marked the end of the Royal Navy's historical involvement in Arctic exploration, the end of an era in which such exploits were widely seen by the British public as worthy expenditures of human effort and monetary resources. Given how difficult and risky it was for professional explorers to cross the Northwest Passage, it would be impossible for the average merchant ships of the day to use this route for trade.

An unnamed commentator in The Critic wrote in 1859, "We think that we can fairly make out the account between the cost and results of these Arctic Expeditions, and ask whether it is worth while to risk so much for that which is so difficult of attainment, and when attained, is so worthless." The navigation of the Northwest Passage in 1903–1905 by Roald Amundsen with the Gjøa expedition ended the centuries-long quest for the route.

=== Northwest Passage discovered ===
Franklin's expedition explored the vicinity of what was ultimately one of many Northwest Passages to be discovered. While the more famous search expeditions were underway in 1850, Robert McClure set out on the little-known McClure Arctic expedition on HMS Investigator to also investigate the fate of Franklin's voyage. While he did not find much evidence of Franklin's fate, he did finally ascertain an ice-bound route that connected the Atlantic Ocean to the Pacific Ocean. This was the Prince of Wales Strait, which was far to the north of Franklin's ships.

On 21 October 1850, the following entry was recorded in Investigator's log:

October 31st, the Captain returned at 8.30. A.M., and at 11.30. A.M., the remainder of the parting, having, upon the 26th instant, ascertained that the waters we are now in communicate with those of Barrow Strait, the north-eastern limit being in latitude 73°31′, N. longitude 114°39′, W. thus establishing the existence of a NORTH-WEST PASSAGE between the Atlantic and Pacific Oceans.

McClure was knighted for his discovery. While the McClure expedition obviously fared much better than Franklin's voyage, it was similarly beset by immense challenges (including the loss of Investigator and four winters on the ice) and a number of controversies, including allegations of selfishness and poor planning on McClure's part. His decision to place numerous message cairns along his route ultimately saved his expedition, who were ultimately found and rescued by the crew of HMS Resolute.

In 1855, a British parliamentary committee concluded that McClure "deserved to be rewarded as the discoverer of a Northwest Passage". Today, the question of who actually discovered the Northwest Passage is a subject of controversy, as all the different Passages have varying degrees of navigability. Although he did confirm the first geographical Northwest Passage that is navigable by ship under ideal conditions, McClure is rarely credited in modern times due to his troubled expedition, his poor personal reputation, the fact that his expedition was after Franklin's (who has a claim to be the first discoverer) and the fact that he never traversed the strait that he found, instead choosing to portage over Banks Island.

==== Simpson Strait ====
Members of the Franklin expedition crossed the southern shore of King William Island and made it onto the Canadian mainland; this is evident by the fact that human remains from the expedition have been found inland on the Adelaide Peninsula. This may have involved walking across the Simpson Strait, which has since been recognised as one of the Northwest Passages to the Pacific. As none of the members of the expedition survived, it is not known whether any member of the party had realised this. George Back had discovered the strait in 1834 but did not realise it was a Northwest Passage. In any case, by 1854, it was widely believed that the remnants of the expedition had crossed the strait, and Lady Franklin was informed of such on 12 January by the Admiralty.

Franklin's claim to having discovered the Passage was strengthened by Charles Richard Weld's assertion that Franklin had long suspected that the Simpson Strait did connect the two oceans. In 1860, McClintock ascertained that the strait was indeed a Northwest Passage. Following this discovery, to honour Franklin's legacy, the Royal Geographical Society declared that his lost expedition was the first expedition to discover the Passage. Lady Franklin was given a medal in his name.

The Northwest Passage would not be fully navigated by boat until 1906, when Roald Amundsen famously traversed the passage on the Gjøa via the Simpson Strait.

== Cultural depictions ==
=== Commemoration ===
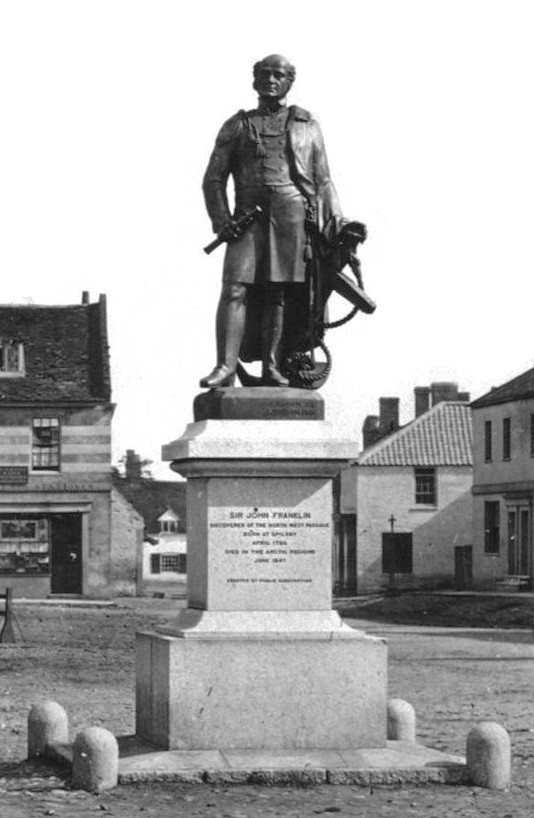
Statue of John Franklin in his home town of Spilsby, Lincolnshire, England

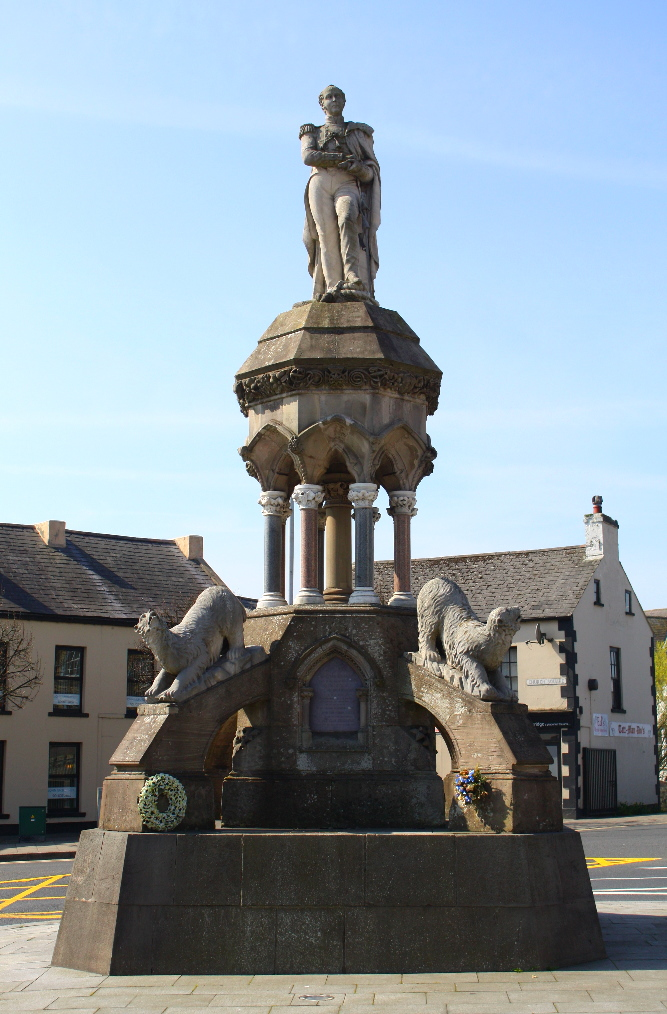
Statue of Francis Crozier in his home town of Banbridge, County Down

For years after the loss of the Franklin expedition, the Victorian media portrayed Franklin as a hero who led his men in the quest for the Northwest Passage. A statue of Franklin in his hometown bears the inscription "Sir John Franklin – Discoverer of the North West Passage", and statues of Franklin outside the Athenaeum in London and in Tasmania bear similar inscriptions. Although the expedition's fate, including the possibility of cannibalism, was widely reported and debated, Franklin's standing with the Victorian public was undiminished. This was due in large part to efforts by Lady Franklin to protect her husband's reputation and dispel suggestions of cannibalism – with assistance from prominent figures like Charles Dickens, who asserted that "there is no reason whatever to believe, that any of its members prolonged their existence by the dreadful expedient of eating the bodies of their dead companions".

On 29 October 2009, a special service of thanksgiving was held in the chapel at the Old Royal Naval College in Greenwich, to accompany the rededication of the national monument to Franklin there. The service also included the solemn re-interment of the only remains from Erebus to be repatriated to England, entombed within the monument in 1873 (previously thought to be Le Vesconte, but may actually have been Goodsir). The following day, a group of polar authors went to London's Kensal Green Cemetery to pay their respects to the Arctic explorers buried there.

=== Literary works ===
From the 1850s through to the present day, Franklin's lost expedition has inspired numerous literary works. Among the first was a play, The Frozen Deep, written by Wilkie Collins with assistance and production by Charles Dickens. The play was performed for private audiences at Tavistock House early in 1857, as well as at the Royal Gallery of Illustration (including a command performance for Queen Victoria) and for the public at the Manchester Trade Union Hall.

Michael Palin's 2018 book, Erebus, The Story of a Ship, was described by The Guardian newspaper as "lively and diligent". He also produced a one-man show based on his book. A children's novel featuring the expedition, Chasing Ghosts – An Arctic Adventure by Nicola Pierce, was published in 2020.

In 2017, The Breathing Hole, a play written by Colleen Murphy, premiered at the Stratford Festival, directed by Reneltta Arluk. In this play, the fates of the crew of Erebus and Terror are featured within the context of an epic saga spanning five hundred years. Commissioned to mark Canada's 150th anniversary and met with critical acclaim, the work involved artists from both Nunavut and the rest of Canada, including collaborations with Qaggiavuut Nunavut Performing Arts. In 2020, the play was published in a dual-language edition in English and in Natsilingmiutut syllabics—the Inuktitut dialect from where the story takes place in the central Arctic.

=== Artistic works ===
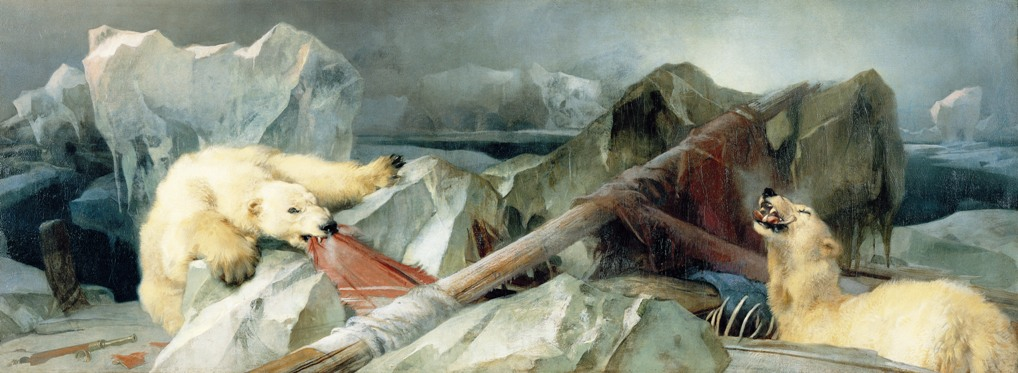
Man Proposes, God Disposes by Edwin Landseer, 1864

In the visual arts, the loss of Franklin's expedition inspired a number of paintings in both the United States and Britain. In 1861, Frederic Edwin Church unveiled his great canvas The Icebergs; later that year, prior to taking it to England for exhibition, he added an image of a broken ship's mast in silent tribute to Franklin. In 1864, Sir Edwin Landseer's Man Proposes, God Disposes caused a stir at the annual Royal Academy exhibition; its depiction of two polar bears, one chewing on a tattered ship's ensign, the other gnawing on a human ribcage, was seen at the time as in poor taste, but has remained one of the most powerful imaginings of the expedition's final fate. The expedition also inspired numerous popular engravings and illustrations, along with many panoramas, dioramas and magic lantern shows.

=== Musical works ===
Franklin's last expedition has also inspired a great deal of music, beginning with the ballad "Lady Franklin's Lament" (also known as "Lord Franklin"), which originated in the 1850s and has been recorded by dozens of artists, among them Martin Carthy, Pentangle, Sinéad O'Connor, and The Pearlfishers. Other Franklin-inspired songs include James Taylor's "Frozen Man" (based on Beattie's photographs of John Torrington) and Iron Maiden's "Stranger in a Strange Land". In 2023, German atmospheric black metal band Antrisch released a concept album "Expedition II: Die Passage" chronicling the events from the point of view of the crew.

=== Onscreen depictions ===
In 2018, AMC released the first season of the TV drama The Terror (based on the book of the same name by Dan Simmons) with executive producer David Kajganich and producers including Soo Hugh and Ridley Scott. Its premise followed the story of Franklin's lost expedition, depicting fictionalised versions of both ships' crew. Sir John Franklin was portrayed by Ciarán Hinds, Francis Crozier by Jared Harris, and James Fitzjames by Tobias Menzies. The series imagines a version of the events that transpired after Franklin's death and the crew's desertion of Terror and Erebus, incorporating supernatural elements and ultimately descending into horror. The series was praised by critics, winning Best Television Series at the 24th Satellite Awards.

=== Significance in Canada ===
The influence of the Franklin expedition on Canadian literature and culture has been especially significant. Stan Rogers' song "Northwest Passage" has been referred to as the unofficial Canadian national anthem. The distinguished Canadian novelist Margaret Atwood has also spoken of Franklin's expedition as a sort of national myth of Canada, remarking that "In every culture many stories are told, (but) only some are told and retold, and these stories bear examining ... in Canadian literature, one such story is the Franklin expedition."

Notable treatments by Canadian poets include a verse play for radio, Terror and Erebus, which was commissioned from Gwendolyn MacEwen, broadcast by CBC Radio (10 January 1965) and subsequently published in her collection Afterworlds (1987); and David Solway's verse cycle Franklin's Passage (2003). The events have also featured prominently in Canadian novels, including Mordecai Richler's Solomon Gursky Was Here (1989) and Dominique Fortier's 2008 French language novel, Du bon usage des étoiles, which creatively considers the Franklin expedition from a variety of perspectives and genres and was both shortlisted and a finalist for several literary awards in Canada (2009 Governor General's Awards). Sheila Fischman's translation of Fortier's novel, On the Proper Use of Stars, was shortlisted for the 2010 Governor General's Awards for French to English Translation. Irish-Canadian writer Ed O'Loughlin's novel Minds of Winter was shortlisted for the 2017 Giller Prize.

== See also ==
- List of incidents of cannibalism
- List of people who disappeared mysteriously at sea
