= Nicola Pierce =

Irish writer; ghost writer

- Born: Tallaght, County Dublin, Ireland
- Known for: Irish Book Award (non-fiction)

Nicola Pierce is an Irish writer and ghost writer. Her 2025 book, Great Irish Wives, won the Irish Book Award for Non-Fiction in December 2025.

== Life and works ==
Born in Tallaght, Dublin, Nicola Pierce attended the Presentation Schools in Terenure and got an Arts Modular degree from University College Dublin.

Her books are aimed at children and young adults. Almost all her books are historical fiction although she has been asked to write history books about some of these historical events. Her first novel ‘Spirit of the Titanic’ was selected for seven different ‘One Book One Community’ Projects. In 2014 her second novel ‘City of Fate’, about World War Two’s Battle of Stalingrad, was considered for the Warwickshire Year Nine Book Award. This novel was followed by ‘Behind the Walls’ about the 1688–89 Siege of Derry. Her 2017 novel ‘Kings of the Boyne’ was shortlisted for 2017 LAI Children’s Book Award.

In the middle of writing her fifth children’s novel, in February 2018, Pierce was diagnosed with stage 3 breast cancer, finally finishing treatment in 2019. During that time, she released the non-fiction ‘Titanic, True Stories of Her Passengers, Crew and Legacy’. Her fifth novel, about the doomed 1845 John Franklin and Captain Francis Crozier expedition to the Arctic, ‘Chasing Ghosts, An Arctic Adventure’ was finally released in March 2020.

== Bibliography ==
- Behind the Walls
- City of Fate
- Kings of the Boyne
- Spirit of the Titanic
- Titanic: True Stories of her Passengers, Crew and Legacy
- Ballymena: City of the Seven Towers
- Coleraine: A Short History (Hardback)
- Lisburn: Phoenix from the Flames
- Chasing Ghosts-An Arctic Adventure

=== Ghostwritten ===
- I Was a Boy in Belsen
- Nobody Will Believe You
- Mother From Hell

=== Anthologies ===
- Reading The Future: New Writing From Ireland
- The Danger and The Glory

== Personal life ==
Pierce has worked and lived in Drogheda since 2011.
