= Horatio Thomas Austin =

Royal Navy officer and explorer

Vice-Admiral Sir Horatio Austin KCB
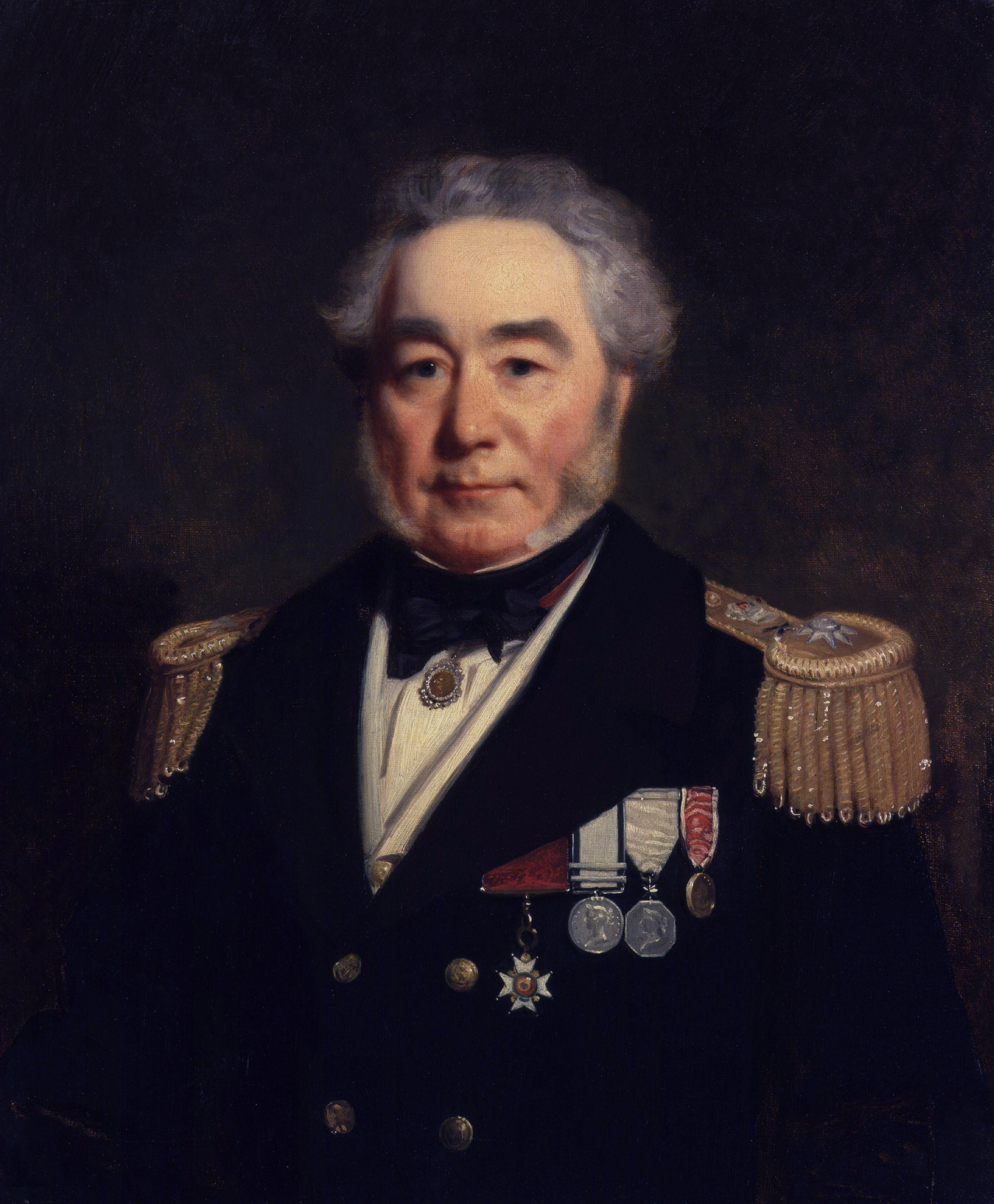
- Austin in 1860
- Born: Horatio Thomas Austin; 10 March 1800; England, United Kingdom
- Died: 16 November 1865 (aged 65); London, United Kingdom
- Burial place: Kensal Green Cemetery
- Spouse: Ann Eliza
- Military career
- Allegiance: United Kingdom
- Branch: Royal Navy
- Service years: 1813–1864
- Rank: Vice-Admiral
- Wars: Egyptian–Ottoman War
- Awards: Knight Commander of the Order of the Bath (1865)

Sir Horatio Thomas Austin KCB (10 March 1800 – 16 November 1865) was a British Royal Navy officer and explorer.

== Biography ==
Austin was born in England on 18 March 1800, the son of an official in the Chatham Dockyard. In 1828, HMS Chanticleer was dispatched on a scientific expedition in the Pacific Ocean under the command of Captain Henry Foster, with Austin as his first lieutenant. Foster explored the South Atlantic, and especially the South Shetland Islands.

Foster drowned in 1831, in the Chagres River in Panama. After Foster's loss, the ship's command fell to Austin. On the expedition, the ship circumnavigated along the Southern Hemisphere and visited the River Plate, Isla de los Estados and South Georgia, before returning to Falmouth in 1830. During the early 1840s he commanded the steam paddle wheel frigate Cyclops.

Following the 1849 failure of Sir James Clark Ross's attempt to locate Franklin's lost expedition, Austin led an expedition in 1850 that also attempted to find the missing explorers. George F. McDougall was second master on board HMS Resolute.

Although the expedition located only traces of Franklin's presence, Austin is credited with organising successful sledging expeditions along the coasts of several North American Arctic islands, including the island of Bathurst, Byam Martin, Melville, and Prince of Wales.

Between October 1850 and March 1851, members of the Resolute crew under Austin published at least five editions of a handwritten newspaper, The Illustrated Arctic News, during the wintering of the Resolute in what they identified as Barrow Strait. Upon the return of the Resolute to home port in England, the manuscript paper was printed in London in 1852. Austin became admiral superintendent at Malta Dockyard in 1863, and died in November 1865.

Austin was appointed a Companion of the Order of the Bath (CB) in 1840, and was promoted to Knight Commander (KCB) in March 1865 just months before his death.

== Sources ==
- Atwood, R.A. (1997). "Shipboard News: Nineteenth Century Handwritten Periodicals at Sea." Proceedings of the Annual Meeting of the Association for Education in Journalism and Mass Communication (80th, Chicago, Illinois, 30 July – 3 August 1997) Addendum I; see also "The Illustrated Arctic News" in The Handwritten Newspapers Project
- Coleman, E.C. (2006). The Royal Navy in Polar Exploration from Franklin to Scott. Tempus.
- Osborn, S.; McDougall, G.F. ed. (1852). Facsimile of the Illustrated Arctic News, Published on Board H.M.S. Resolute. London: Ackerman.
