= Alexander Armstrong (Royal Navy officer) =

Irish naval surgeon and explorer (1818–1899)

Sir Alexander Armstrong KCB FRS
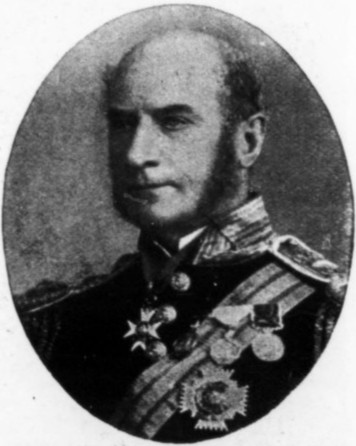
- Born: c. 1818; County Donegal, United Kingdom of Great Britain and Ireland
- Died: 4 July 1899 (aged 81); Sutton Bonington, United Kingdom of Great Britain and Ireland
- Education: Doctorate of Medicine, Trinity College Kirk
- Occupation: Naval surgeon
- Known for: Journals kept onboard HMS Investigator, serving as director-general of the Royal Navy Medical Department
- Awards: Arctic Medal, Baltic Medal, Sir Gilbert Blane Medal, Jubilee Medal

Sir Alexander Armstrong KCB FRS (c. 1818 – 4 July 1899) was an Irish naval surgeon, explorer, naturalist and author. After obtaining a medical degree he joined the Royal Navy and was stationed on board HMS Investigator, tasked with finding the lost expedition of explorer Sir John Franklin. Investigator was trapped in the ice at Mercy Bay in 1851 and Armstrong spent several winters in the Arctic before he returned to London.

Armstrong's account of the voyage, Personal narrative of the discovery of the north-west passage, was published in 1857. It won the Gilbert Blane gold medal for the best journal kept by a Royal Navy surgeon. He also published a second book entitled Observations on naval hygiene and scurvy, more particularly as the latter appeared during a polar voyage. He continued in a career with the Royal Navy, serving in the Baltic Sea during the Battle of Suomenlinna. He was also superintendent of hospitals in Malta and England and he became director-general of the Royal Navy's medical department in 1869. He was knighted into the Order of the Bath in 1871.

== Early life and family ==
Armstrong was born c. 1818 in County Donegal, United Kingdom of Great Britain and Ireland. His father was Alexander Armstrong. He studied medicine in Dublin and the University of Edinburgh, graduating from the latter as a Doctor of Medicine with honours.

== Arctic expedition ==
In 1842 he joined the Royal Navy as an assistant surgeon. He travelled throughout the British Empire and many parts of the world, including the Mediterranean Sea, Pacific Islands, North and South America, and the West Indies. He was promoted to surgeon in 1849.

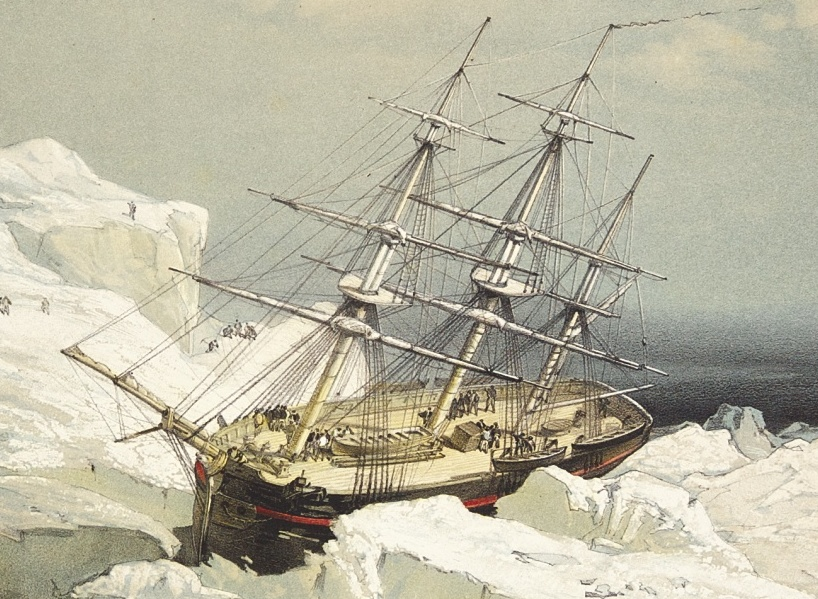
HMS Investigator depicted trapped in the ice during the McClure Arctic expedition

In 1850, Armstrong left London aboard HMS Investigator as a surgeon and naturalist. The ship was part of the McClure Arctic expedition tasked with finding Franklin's lost expedition. The ship completed the tracing of the Northwest Passage and tried to sail around Banks Island, but became trapped by the ice at Mercy Bay in 1851, and spent two winters trapped there.

Armstrong was not popular amongst the other officers, and the missionary amongst the crew, Johann August Miertsching, noted an incident where Armstrong's roommates were interacting roughly with him. During this time, Armstrong collected fossils on Banks and Victoria Island.

Armstrong and the crew were rescued by HMS Resolute in 1853. Armstrong was unable to bring his animal and plant collection with him, but did retrieve his journals against the orders of his captain Robert John Le Mesurier McClure, and a specimen of petrified wood from the Paleogene period. Armstrong and the crew had to spend another winter in the Arctic before they returned to England aboard supply ships for another expedition in search of the Franklin voyage. During this travel he also collected seven brachiopod specimens on Beechey Island.

== Publication career ==
In 1857, Armstrong published his journals of the HMS Investigator expedition called Personal narrative of the discovery of the north-west passage. This was the third account of the expedition: it confirmed the emotions expressed in Miertsching's published journals, while contradicting McClure's claims that the crew would have survived if they were not rescued. The book was awarded the Gilbert Blane gold medal for the best journal kept by a Royal Navy surgeon.

In 1858 he published Observations on naval hygiene and scurvy, more particularly as the latter appeared during a polar voyage. The book is based on his experiences while trapped in the Arctic, and outlines the measures the crew took to prevent getting scurvy and how they treated it once the condition started appearing.

== Later life and death ==
Armstrong completed many seagoing appointments with the Royal Navy. He was in the Baltic Sea during the Crimean War and participated in the Battle of Suomenlinna. He was promoted to deputy-inspector general after surviving two attacks by a flotilla of boats in 1858. He was transferred to the Mediterranean Fleet as superintendent of naval hospitals in Malta, Haslar, and Chatham. In 1869, he became director-general of the Royal Navy's medical department.

He was knighted into the Order of the Bath in 1871. He also received the Arctic Medal, Baltic Medal, and a Jubilee Medal. He retired in 1880.

Armstrong married Charlotte Hall (née Simpson) in 1894. He died on 4 July 1899 in his home in Sutton Bonington, England.

== Legacy ==
Croton armstrongli is named for Armstrong, after he collected a sample of the tree on an expedition to Port Essington. In the 1980s, the Conservation Commission of the Northern Territory surveyed the closed forests of the area and could not find a specimen of C. armstrongli. It is possible that the location of the specimen's collection was incorrectly labelled.
