= List of shipwrecks in June 1853 =

The list of shipwrecks in June 1853 includes ships sunk, foundered, wrecked, grounded, or otherwise lost during June 1853.

== 1 June ==
List of shipwrecks: June 1853
Ship	State	Description
Amazon	United Kingdom	The full-rigged ship was wrecked off Cape Sable Island, Nova Scotia, British North America. Her crew were rescued. Amazon was on a voyage from Sunderland, County Durham to New York, United States. The wreck was plundered by the crews of the schooners Juvenile, Mary S. Hurd and Rogers (all United States).
Reginald Heber	United Kingdom	The barque was in collision with the clipper Aramingo (United States). The master and eight or nine of her crew got aboard Aramingo, leaving seven crew aboard. Reginald Heber was presumed to have sunk on 2 June. She was on a voyage from Callao, Peru to Hampton Roads, Virginia, United States.
Skytsengelln	Flag unknown	The ship was wrecked near King's Lynn, Norfolk, United Kingdom.

== 2 June ==
List of shipwrecks: 2 June 1853
Ship	State	Description
Eppien	Kingdom of Hanover	The ship was driven ashore at Gilleleje, Denmark. She was on a voyage from London, United Kingdom to Saint Petersburg, Russia. She was refloated and taken in to Helsingør, Denmark in a leaky condition.
Jonge Jan	Belgium	The ship was lost off Kuressaare, Russia. She was on a voyage from Liverpool, Lancashire, United Kingdom to Kuressaare.
Rose	United Kingdom	The whaler was crushed by ice in Melville Bay. She was subsequently taken in to "Disco", Greenland where she was condemned and abandoned. Her crew were taken home by the transport ship Diligence (United Kingdom).
South Esk	United Kingdom	The ship was driven ashore on Saltholm, Denmark. She was on a voyage for Riga, Russia to Dundee, Forfarshire. She was refloated and taken in to Helsingør in a sinking condition.
Times	United Kingdom	The steamship suffered a boiler explosion which killed fourteen passengers and injured more than twenty others. She was on a voyage from Dublin to Liverpool, Lancashire.

== 3 June ==
List of shipwrecks: 3 June 1853
Ship	State	Description
Douglas	United Kingdom	The brig was driven ashore at Guy Head, Massachusetts, United States. She was on a voyage from Bridport, Dorset to Maitland, Nova Scotia, British North America. She was refloated the next day.
HMS Investigator	Royal Navy	HMS Investigator stuck in ice, 1851. McClure Arctic Expedition: The ship was abandoned in Mercy Bay, having been icebound for three years. She subsequently sank.

== 4 June ==
List of shipwrecks: 4 June 1853
Ship	State	Description
Walmer Castle	United Kingdom	The ship arrived at Barbuda on fire and was beached. She was on a voyage from Liverpool, Lancashire to San Francisco, California. She was consequently condemned.

== 5 June ==
List of shipwrecks: 5 June 1853
Ship	State	Description
Albatross	United Kingdom	The ship was driven ashore in the West Gat. She was refloated the next day and taken in to Texel, North Holland, Netherlands in a leaky condition.

== 6 June ==
List of shipwrecks: 6 June 1853
Ship	State	Description
Carrier Pigeon	United States	The clipper ran aground and was wrecked at Santa Cruz, California. Her crew survived. She was on her maiden voyage, from Boston, Massachusetts to San Francisco, California.

== 7 June ==
List of shipwrecks: 7 June 1853
Ship	State	Description
Mary Ellen	United Kingdom	The brig was driven ashore at Thomas Point, Maryland, United States. She was on a voyage from Puerto rico to Baltimore, Maryland. She was later refloated and towed in to Baltimore, where she arrived on 11 June.
HMS Odin	Royal Navy	The frigate ran aground at Lisbon, Portugal. She was refloated and resumed her voyage to an English port.
Perrine	France	The schooner sprang a leak and foundered in the Atlantic Ocean 16 nautical miles (30 km) north north west of the Île de Sein, Finistère. Her crew were rescued. She was on a voyage from a port in Sunderland, County Durham, United Kingdom to Bordeaux, Gironde.

== 8 June ==
List of shipwrecks: 8 June 1853
Ship	State	Description
Nessree	United Kingdom	The ship was wrecked at "Hubshee Janjeera", on the coast of Hindostan 40 nautical miles (74 km) from Bombay, India with the loss of 356 of the 450 people on board.
Pursuit	United Kingdom	The ship foundered in the Atlantic Ocean 35 nautical miles (65 km) north west of Tory Island, County Donegal. Her crew were rescued. She was on a voyage from the Clyde to Sligo.
Squantum	United States	The ship was driven ashore at Kirk Santon Head, Isle of Man. Her passengers were landed. She was on a voyage from Liverpool, Lancashire, United Kingdom to Boston, Massachusetts. She was refloated with assistance from HMS Porcupine (Royal Navy) and towed in to Liverpool, arriving on 10 June.
St. Mary	United Kingdom	The barque ran aground and was severely damaged off Barbacoas, Republic of New Granada and was damaged. She was on a voyage from Panama City, Republic of New Granada to Liverpool, Lancashire. She was refloated and put back to Panama City.

== 9 June ==
List of shipwrecks: 9 June 1853
Ship	State	Description
Auriga	United Kingdom	The ship ran aground on a rock south of Bangka Island, Netherlands East Indies. She was on a voyage from Singapore to Melbourne, Victoria. She was refloated and put back to Singapore.
Gratitude	United Kingdom	The ship was driven ashore in the River Mersey. She was on a voyage from London to Liverpool, Lancashire. She was refloated and taken in to Liverpool.
Ruby	United Kingdom	The ship was driven ashore at Terranova di Sicilia, Sicily.

== 10 June ==
List of shipwrecks: 10 June 1853
Ship	State	Description
Christine	United Kingdom	The ship was driven ashore east of Gibraltar. She was on a voyage from Odesa to Queenstown, County Cork. She was refloated on 16 June and taken in to Gibraltar in a leaky condition.
Condor	United Kingdom	The steamship was destroyed by fire in the South Atlantic. Her crew were rescued by Charles et Pauline (France). Condor was on a voyage from Melbourne, Melbourne to London.
Fritz	France	The ship was driven ashore at Gibraltar. She was on a voyage from Cette, Hérault to New York.
Katica	Russia	The ship was driven ashore at Gibraltar. She was on a voyage from Izmail to Queenstown.
Marie	France	The ship was driven ashore at Gibraltar. She was on a voyage from Marseille, Bouches-du-Rhône to Martinique. She was refloated and taken in to Gibraltar.
Silas Leonard	Trieste	The ship was driven ashore at Newport, Rhode Island, United States. She was on a voyage from Matanzas, Cuba to Trieste.
Thetis	United Kingdom	The ship was driven ashore at Gibraltar. She was on a voyage from Galaţi, Ottoman Empire to an English port. She was refloated and taken in to Gibraltar.
Villa di Sorrenti	Kingdom of the Two Sicilies	The brigantine was driven ashore west of Gibraltar. She was on a voyage from Licata to Falmouth, Cornwall, United Kingdom.

== 11 June ==
List of shipwrecks: 11 June 1853
Ship	State	Description
Commodore, or Commandeur	Denmark	The ship was destroyed by fire in the English Channel. Her crew were rescued by Duke of Cornwall (United Kingdom). Commodore was on a voyage from Hamburg to Veracruz, Mexico.
Elizabeth and Ann	United Kingdom	The sloop was severely damaged by fire at Arbroath, Forfarshire.
Integrity	United Kingdom	The ship was in collision with another vessel in the North Sea and was abandoned. Her crew were rescued by the vessel she collided with. Integrity was discovered by Fairy (United Kingdom) and taken in to Hartlepool, County Durham.
Jane	United Kingdom	The ship ran aground on the Herd Sand, in the North Sea off the coast of County Durham. She was refloated and taken in to South Shields, County Durham.
Sphynx	United Kingdom	The ship was wrecked on the Pedro Shoals, 70 nautical miles (130 km) west of the coast of Jamaica. She was on a voyage from Liverpool, Lancashire to Belize City, British Honduras.

== 12 June ==
List of shipwrecks: 12 June 1853
Ship	State	Description
Ambassador	Malta	The brig struck the Seven Stones reef and sank. Her crew reached the Seven Stones Lightship ( Trinity House) in the ship's boats. She was on a voyage from Cardiff, Glamorgan to Malta.
Pazarro	Danzig	The schooner was driven ashore and wrecked in the River Tay. She was on a voyage from Danzig to Perth, United Kingdom.

== 13 June ==
List of shipwrecks: 13 June 1853
Ship	State	Description
Charlotte	United Kingdom	The ship was wrecked at Mapou, Mauritius. She was on a voyage from Moulmein, Burma to Liverpool, Lancashire.
Henrietta	(United Kingdom of Great Britain and Ireland) New South Wales	The ship was driven ashore in the Western Channel, Sydney.
Otto	Flag unknown	The ship was driven ashore near Kolberg. She was on a voyage from London, United Kingdom to a port in the Grand Duchy of Finland.

== 14 June ==
List of shipwrecks: 14 June 1853
Ship	State	Description
Union	United Kingdom	The schooner was driven ashore in the Pentland Firth. She was on a voyage from Thurso, Caithness to Glasgow, Renfrewshire. She was refloated the next day and resumed her voyage.

== 16 June ==
List of shipwrecks: 16 June 1853
Ship	State	Description
City of Poonah	India	The ship was driven ashore and wrecked at Saugor. She was on a voyage from Calcutta to London.
Creole	United States	The steamship was driven ashore and wrecked.
Empire	United States	The steamboat was run into by a sloop, causing a boiler explosion which killed seven people and severely injured twelve more in the Hudson River at New York.

== 17 June ==
List of shipwrecks: 17 June 1853
Ship	State	Description
Camille	France	The ship was driven ashore at Kronstadt, Russia. She was on a voyage from Rouen, Seine-Inférieure to Kronstadt, Russia.
Harmony	(United Kingdom of Great Britain and Ireland) Jersey	The smack ran aground in the River Neath. She was on a voyage from Neath, Glamorgan to Jersey. She was refloated.
Solon	United States	The barque was wrecked on the Suttle Inagua Reef. Her crew were rescued. She was on a voyage from New York to Cuba.

== 18 June ==
List of shipwrecks: 18 June 1853
Ship	State	Description
Earl of Charlemont	United Kingdom	The ship struck a reef off Point Flinders, Victoria and was wrecked with the loss of one life. She was on a voyage from Liverpool, Lancashire to Port Phillip, Victoria and Sydney, New South Wales.
Gledan	United Kingdom	The ship sprang a leak and was beached at Porthdinllaen, Caernarfonshire. She was on a voyage from Whitehaven, Cumberland to Newport, Monmouthshire.
Liberty	United Kingdom	The ship ran aground off Kronstadt, Russia. She was on a voyage from Newcastle upon Tyne, Northumberland to Kronstadt, Russia. She was refloated with the assistance of a steamship and taken in to Kronstadt.

== 19 June ==
List of shipwrecks: 19 June 1853
Ship	State	Description
Advance	United Kingdom	The ship was driven ashore at Holyhead, Anglesey. She was on a voyage from Mobile, Alabama, United States to Liverpool, Lancashire. She was refloated and resumed her voyage.

== 20 June ==
List of shipwrecks: 20 June 1853
Ship	State	Description
Jane, or Return	United Kingdom	The brig sank between the Burrows Sand and the Middle Sand, in the North Sea off the coast of Essex.
Tasso	United Kingdom	The brig was driven ashore and severely damaged on the Île d'Orléans, Province of Canada, British North America. She was on a voyage from Sunderland, County Durham to Quebec City, Province of Canada. She was later refloated and towed in to Quebec City.

== 21 June ==
List of shipwrecks: 21 June 1853
Ship	State	Description
Havre	France	The ship was driven ashore at "Petitinga", Brazil. She was on a voyage from Pernambuco to the Rio Grande del Norte.

== 22 June ==
List of shipwrecks: 22 June 1853
Ship	State	Description
Challenge	United States	The steamship suffered a boiler explosion and sank in Lake Michigan with the loss of five lives. Survivors were rescued by the schooner North Star (United States). Challenge was on her maiden voyage.
Nassree	Emirate of Diriyah	The ship was wrecked 30 nautical miles (56 km) south of Bombay, India with the loss of about 300 of the 400 people on board. She was on a voyage from Bombay to Jeddah.

== 23 June ==
List of shipwrecks: 23 June 1853
Ship	State	Description
Clementine	France	The ship foundered in the North Sea. Her crew were rescued. She was on a voyage from Newcastle upon Tyne, Northumberland, United Kingdom to Algiers, Algeria.
Litherland	(United Kingdom of Great Britain and Ireland) Van Diemen's Land	The ship struck a rock and sank off Clarke's Island. Her crew were rescued. She was on a voyage from Newcastle, New South Wales to Hobart.
Marion	United Kingdom	The ship was wrecked 3 nautical miles (5.6 km) west of the Savage Lighthouse, Burma.

== 24 June ==
List of shipwrecks: 24 June 1853
Ship	State	Description
Faze Kareem	(Ottoman Empire) Yemen Vilayet	The steamship foundered in a shamal 20 nautical miles (37 km) off Aden with the loss of 180 of the 191 people on board. She was on a voyage from Aden to Bombay, India.
Loharee	India	The ship was abandoned in the Indian Ocean.
Maffra	Hamburg	The ship ran aground and sank near Stade. She was on a voyage from Sunderland, County Durham, United Kingdom to Hamburg.
Marine	Hamburg	The ship ran aground on the Vogelsand, in the North Sea off ht mouth of the Elbe. She was refloated and taken in to Cuxhaven in a severely leaky condition.

== 25 June ==
List of shipwrecks: 25 June 1853
Ship	State	Description
Clementine	France	The ship foundered in the North Sea. Her crew were rescued. She was on a voyage from Newcastle upon Tyne, Northumberland, United Kingdom to Algiers, Algeria.
Erin, Jessie, and St. Joseph	United Kingdom (United Kingdom of Great Britain and Ireland) British North America	The tug St. Joseph caught fire at Quebec City, Province of Canada. The fire spread to Jessie, which was cast loose and drifted into the brig Erin, setting her on fire too. Erin was destroyed, Jessie was scuttled.
Loharee	United Kingdom	The barque was abandoned in the Indian Ocean. She was on a voyage from South Shields, County Durham to Calcutta, India.
Oscar	United Kingdom	The ship was driven ashore at the Rammekins Castle, Zeeland, Netherlands. She was on a voyage from Antwerp, Belgium to Sunderland, County Durham.

== 26 June ==
List of shipwrecks: 26 June 1853
Ship	State	Description
Catherine	United Kingdom	The ship ran aground at Geelong, Victoria. She was on a voyage from Singapore, Straits Settlements to Melbourne, Victoria.
Cheshire Witch	United Kingdom	The ship ran aground at Geelong. She was on a voyage from Melbourne to Sydney, New South Wales.
Jessie	United Kingdom	The ship was damaged by fire at Quebec City, Province of Canada, British North America.
Neptune	United Kingdom	The ship was driven ashore and wrecked in Chale Bay, Isle of Wight. Her crew were rescued by the Coast Guard. She was on a voyage from Exeter, Devon to Middlesbrough, Yorkshire.
Matilda	United Kingdom	The brig was driven ashore and wrecked at Holyhead, Anglesey with the loss of one of her four crew. She was on a voyage from Bahia, Brazil to Liverpool, Lancashire.

== 27 June ==
List of shipwrecks: 27 June 1853
Ship	State	Description
Argus	United Kingdom	The ship ran aground at Southwold, Suffolk. She was on a voyage from South Shields, County Durham to Calais, France.
John Bright	United Kingdom	The barque was driven ashore at Cefn Sidan, Pembrokeshire. She was on a voyage from Liverpool, Lancashire to Newport, Monmouthshire.
Wilhelmina	Belgium	The ship was driven ashore near Vlissingen, Zeeland, Netherlands. She was on a voyage from Antwerp to Gothenburg, Sweden.

== 28 June ==
List of shipwrecks: 28 June 1853
Ship	State	Description
Argus	France	The ship ran aground at Southwold, Suffolk, United Kingdom. She was on a voyage from South Shields, County Durham, United Kingdom to Calais.
Eliza Appleton	United States	The ship ran aground on the Oyster Bank, off Newcastle, New South Wales and broke her back. She was on a voyage from California to Sydney, New South Wales.
Elizabeth Fulton	United States	The ship sprang a leak and sank in the Atlantic Ocean. Her crew were rescued. She was on a voyage from Boston, Massachusetts to a port in California.
Jan Hendrik	Netherlands	The ship ran aground on the Goodwin Sands, Kent, United Kingdom. She was on a voyage from Batavia, Netherlands East Indies to Amsterdam, North Holland. Jan Hendrik was refloated and taken in to Margate, Kent in a severely leaky condition.
Maria	United Kingdom	The ship was lost in the Pacific Ocean. Her crew were rescued. She was on a voyage from Callao, Peru to Liverpool, Lancashire.

== 29 June ==
List of shipwrecks: 29 June 1853
Ship	State	Description
Ann and Elizabeth	United Kingdom	The ship was run ashore and wrecked in the Humber. Her crew were rescued. She was on a voyage from Grimsby, Lincolnshire to Hull, Yorkshire.
Juano F. Fone	Chile	The barque was driven ashore and wrecked at Valparaíso.
Middleton	United Kingdom	The ship was wrecked off the coast of Lombok, Netherlands East Indies. Her crew survived. She was on a voyage from Hobart, Van Diemen's Land to Batavia, Netherlands East Indies.
Prince Eugene	United Kingdom	The ship was driven ashore at Stag Harbour Point, Fogo Island, Newfoundland, British North America. She was on a voyage from Poole, Dorset to Fogo Island. She was later refloated and towed in to Stag Harbour in a waterlogged condition and placed under repair.

== 30 June ==
List of shipwrecks: 30 June 1853
Ship	State	Description
Castro Primiero	Portugal	The ship ran aground and was wrecked off Domesnes, Russia. Her crew were rescued. She was on a voyage from Porto to Riga, Russia.
Roomport	Netherlands	The ship ran aground on the Caloo Bank and was abandoned. She was on a voyage from Akyab, Burma to Zeirikzee, South Holland. She was refloated but consequently sank.

== Unknown date ==
List of shipwrecks: Unknown date in June 1853
Ship	State	Description
Agatha	(United Kingdom of Great Britain and Ireland) Cape Colony	The ship was wrecked at the mouth of the Umtata River with the loss of three of the six people on board. She was on a voyage from the Buffalo River to the Umtata River.
Burgermeister Bencard	Grand Duchy of Mecklenburg-Schwerin	The ship was driven ashore in the Dardanelles before 14 June. She was on a voyage from Odesa to a British port.
Caldera	United States	The barque was wrecked on a reef off Fanning Island, Gilbert and Ellice Islands. All on board were rescued.
Charles Mallory	United States	The clipper was driven ashore at Cabo de Santo Agostinho, Brazil and was abandoned. She was on a voyage from Honolulu, Hawaii to New London, Connecticut.
Charlotte Bourne	United Kingdom	The ship was wrecked at Mauritius before 21 June. She was on a voyage from Liverpool, Lancashire to Moulmein, Burma.
Christine	United Kingdom	The ship was driven ashore at Gibraltar before 10 June. She was on a voyage from Odesa to an English port.
Douce Davie	United Kingdom	The barque was wrecked at Bluefields, Nicaragua in late June. She was on a voyage from Aspinwall, Pennsylvania, United States to Belize City, British Honduras.
Eppion	Netherlands	The ship was driven ashore before 3 June. She was on a voyage from London, United Kingdom to Saint Petersburg, Russia. She was refloated and taken in to Helsingør, Denmark.
France	France	The ship was wrecked before 10 June. She was on a voyage from Cette, Hérault to Barcelona, Spain.
Fritz	United States	The ship was driven ashore at Gibraltar before 10 June. She was on a voyage from Cette, Hérault, France to New York.
Garrick	(United Kingdom of Great Britain and Ireland) Gibraltar	The ship was driven ashore at New York, United States before 25 June. She was on a voyage from Gibraltar to New York. Garrick was later refloated.
Harriet	United Kingdom	The ship foundered in the Atlantic Ocean before 8 June. Her crew were rescued. She was on a voyage from Liverpool to Tatmagouche, Nova Scotia, British North America.
Kalica	United Kingdom	The ship was driven ashore at Gibraltar before 10 June. She was on a voyage from "Ismael" to Queenstown, County Cork.
Lowder	United Kingdom	The ship was wrecked between the Conflict Reef and Orange Island. She was on a voyage from Sierra Leone to Liverpool, Lancashire.
Marie	France	The ship was driven ashore at Gibraltar before 10 June. She was on a voyage from Marseille, Bouches-du-Rhône to Martinique.
Mary	(United Kingdom of Great Britain and Ireland) British North America	The ship was wrecked on Big Mud Island, Province of Canada in mid-June.
St. Mary	United Kingdom	The barque ran aground on a reef off Barbacoas. She was refloated and put back to Panama City, Republic of Colombia.
Prince of Wales	(United Kingdom of Great Britain and Ireland) New South Wales	The brig capsized in the Pacific Ocean off Cape Howe with the loss of all hands. She was on a voyage from Port Phillip, Victoria to Sydney.
Thetis	United Kingdom	The ship was driven ashore at Gibraltar before 10 June. She was on a voyage from Galaţi, Ottoman Empire to an English port.
Victoria	United Kingdom	The ship was wrecked in the Torres Strait before 6 June. Seventeen people were rescued from Booby Island, New South Wales on that date by Trafalgar ( (United Kingdom of Great Britain and Ireland) New South Wales). Victoria was on a voyage from Melbourne, Victoria to Mauritius.
Witness	(United Kingdom of Great Britain and Ireland) New South Wales	The ship was wrecked near Cape Northumberland, South Australia before 7 June. She was on a voyage from Adelaide, South Australia to Melbourne.
