= Edward Adams (surgeon) =

English naval surgeon

- Born: 24 February 1824; Great Barton, Suffolk, England
- Died: 12 November 1856 (aged 32); Colony of Sierra Leone
- Military career
- Branch: Royal Navy
- Service years: 1847–1856
- Rank: Assistant surgeon
- Postings: Royal Hospital Haslar; Naval Hospital Devonport; HMS Investigator; HMS Enterprise
- Expeditions: Ross expedition (1848); Collinson expedition (1850)

Edward Adams (24 February 1824 – 12 November 1856) was an English Royal Navy officer, naval surgeon, naturalist, artist and Arctic explorer.

== Early life and career ==
Adams was born at Great Barton, near Bury St Edmunds, on 24 February 1824. He became interested in natural history as a child. He qualified as a surgeon in April 1847, and in August of the same year became an assistant surgeon at the Royal Hospital Haslar in Gosport, Hampshire, before securing a transfer to the Naval Hospital in Devonport three months later.

== Arctic exploration ==
=== Ross expedition ===
In 1848, four months after his transfer to Devonport, he volunteered to join Sir James Clark Ross on his Arctic expedition to search for traces of Sir John Franklin's missing Northwest Passage expedition. Adams was aboard HMS Investigator under Captain Edward Joseph Bird. They left in May 1848, but returned 18 months later without success.

=== Collinson expedition ===
In January 1850, Adams left on another expedition to look for Franklin. This time he was aboard HMS Enterprise under Captain Richard Collinson. They reached the Bering Strait in August, and Adams was put ashore at St. Michael, just north of the Yukon delta, to investigate reports of possible survivors from Franklin's crew. He rejoined the Enterprise in July 1851, sailing east below Banks Island and Victoria Island, and penetrating further east than any ship previously. They returned to England in 1855.

== Sierra Leone ==
Adams passed his full naval surgeon's exams, and travelled to west Africa in May 1856, on board the steamship Hecla. He died there of typhus, and was buried at Sierra Leone.

In naming the yellow-billed loon, English zoologist George Robert Gray honoured by Adams naming its species epithet after him: Gavia adamsii.
