= Deans Dundas Bay =

Bay in the Northwest Territories, Canada

- Location within Northwest Territories
- Location: Prince of Wales Strait
- Coordinates: 72°16′02″N 118°19′09″W
- Ocean/sea sources: Arctic Ocean
- Basin countries: Canada
- Settlements: Uninhabited

Deans Dundas Bay is a Canadian Arctic waterway in the Northwest Territories. It is an eastern arm of Prince of Wales Strait in Victoria Island's Prince Albert Peninsula, situated across from Banks Island.
