= Mercy Bay =

Bay in the Northwest Territories, Canada

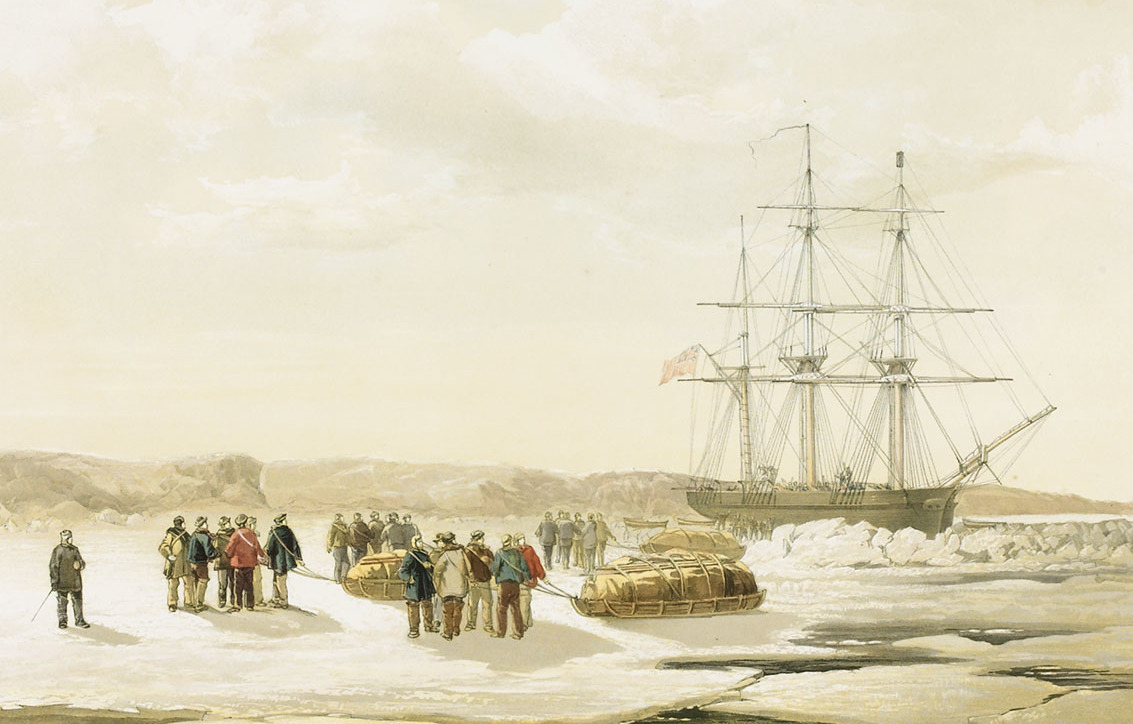
- HMS Investigator in Mercy Bay

- Location within Northwest Territories
- Location: M'Clure Strait
- Coordinates: 74°05′02″N 119°00′10″W
- Ocean/sea sources: Arctic Ocean
- Basin countries: Canada
- Settlements: Uninhabited

Mercy Bay is a Canadian Arctic waterway in the Northwest Territories. It is a southern arm of M'Clure Strait on northeast Banks Island. The mouth of Castel Bay is less than 20 km (12 mi) to the west. These bays are a part of Aulavik National Park.

== HMS Investigator ==
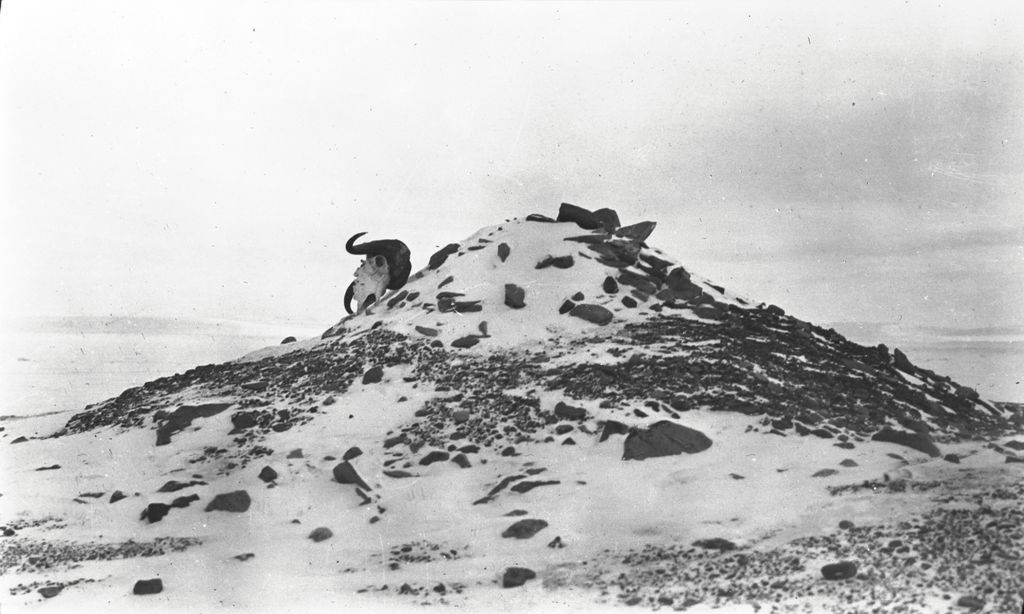
Capt. M'Clure's monument at Mercy Bay

In September 1851, Captain Robert McClure's ship, HMS Investigator became ice trapped in Mercy Bay during the McClure Arctic expedition while searching for the Northwest Passage and Franklin's lost expedition. Investigator was trapped for two years, before the ship was discovered by one of Edward Belcher's rescue expeditions, including HMS Resolute. By 1853, Investigator was finally abandoned in the bay, and the surviving crew members sledged over a hundred miles of ice to Resolute and had to spend another winter at Dealey Island just south of Melville Island. Resolute tried to sail out the following Spring, but the ship too became trapped in the ice, so Captain Belcher ordered that it and three other ships in his squadron be abandoned in the ice. The crews and survivors then sledged hundreds of miles east to Beechey Island to another of his ships, HMS North Star, which was not trapped, and from there they were ferried back to England, all arriving home by 1854. Captain McClure was court-martialed for losing his ship but then promoted because he and his surviving crew had, in a fashion, traveled the entire Northwest Passage.

In July 2010, Parks Canada archeologists looking for HMS Investigator found it fifteen minutes after they started a sonar scan of Banks Island, Mercy Bay, Northwest Territories. The archaeology crew had no plans to raise the ship. They did a thorough sonar scan of the area, then sent a remotely operated underwater vehicle (ROUV). The Canadian archaeologists found the ship "largely intact", sitting upright, approximately 7.6 m (25 ft) under the Arctic Ocean. Its masts were missing, probably sheared away by the ice. The wreck is considered to be one of the best preserved in the world.
