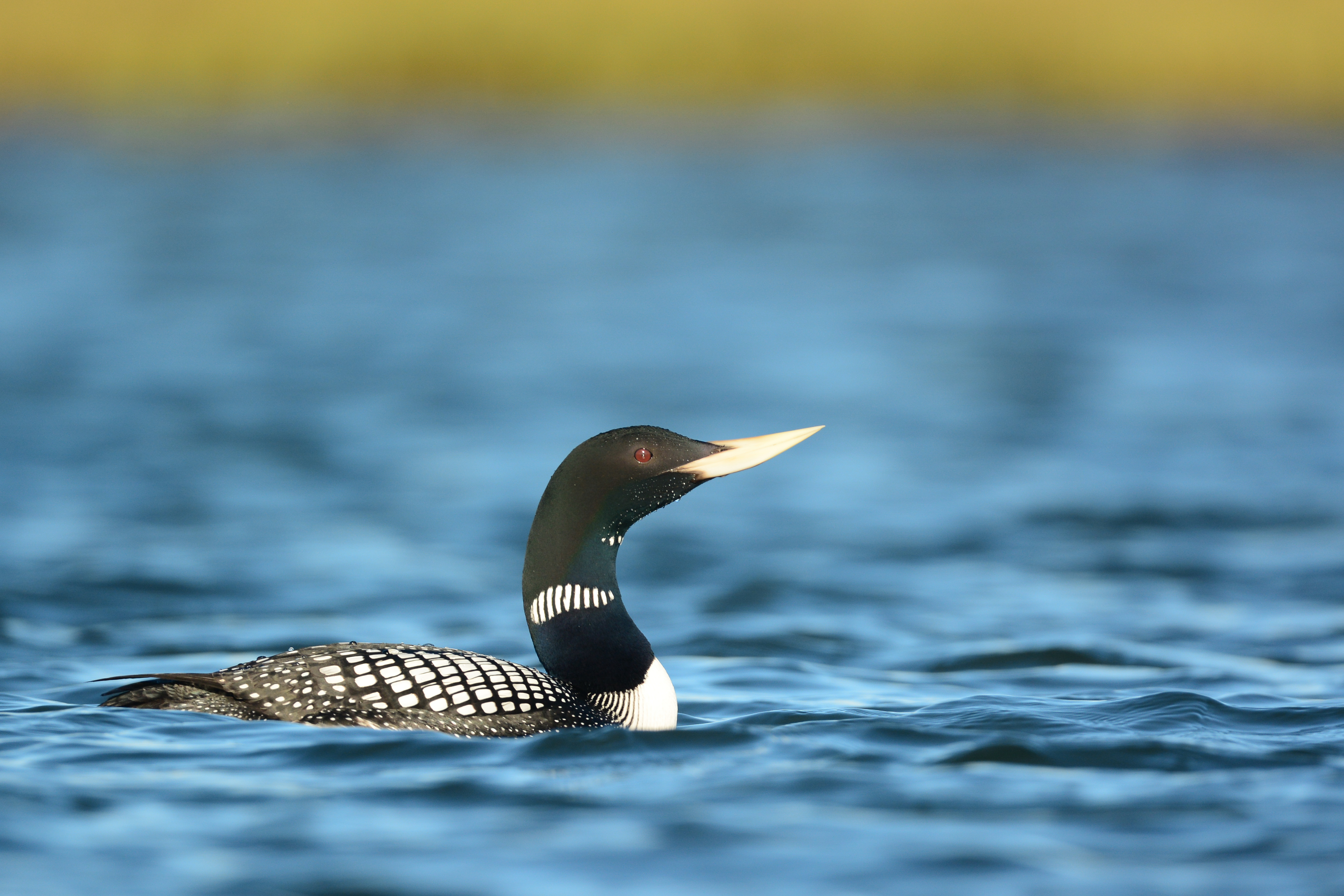

Conservation status
- Near Threatened (IUCN 3.1)

Scientific classification
- Kingdom: Animalia
- Phylum: Chordata
- Class: Aves
- Order: Gaviiformes
- Family: Gaviidae
- Genus: Gavia
- Species: G. adamsii

Binomial name
- Gavia adamsii (Gray, 1859)
- Range of G. adamsii Breeding range Wintering range

= Yellow-billed loon =

Species of bird

The yellow-billed loon (Gavia adamsii), also known as the white-billed diver, is the largest member of the loon or diver family. Breeding adults have a black head, white underparts and a chequered black-and-white mantle. Non-breeding plumage is drabber with the chin and foreneck white. Its main distinguishing feature is the long straw-yellow bill, which, because the culmen is straight, appears slightly uptilted.

It breeds in the Arctic and winters mainly at sea along the coasts of the northern Pacific Ocean and northwestern Norway; it also sometimes overwinters on large inland lakes. It occasionally strays well south of its normal wintering range and has been recorded as a vagrant in more than 22 countries. This species, like all divers, is a specialist fish-eater, catching its prey underwater. Its call is an eerie wailing, lower-pitched than the common loon.

== Taxonomy and etymology ==
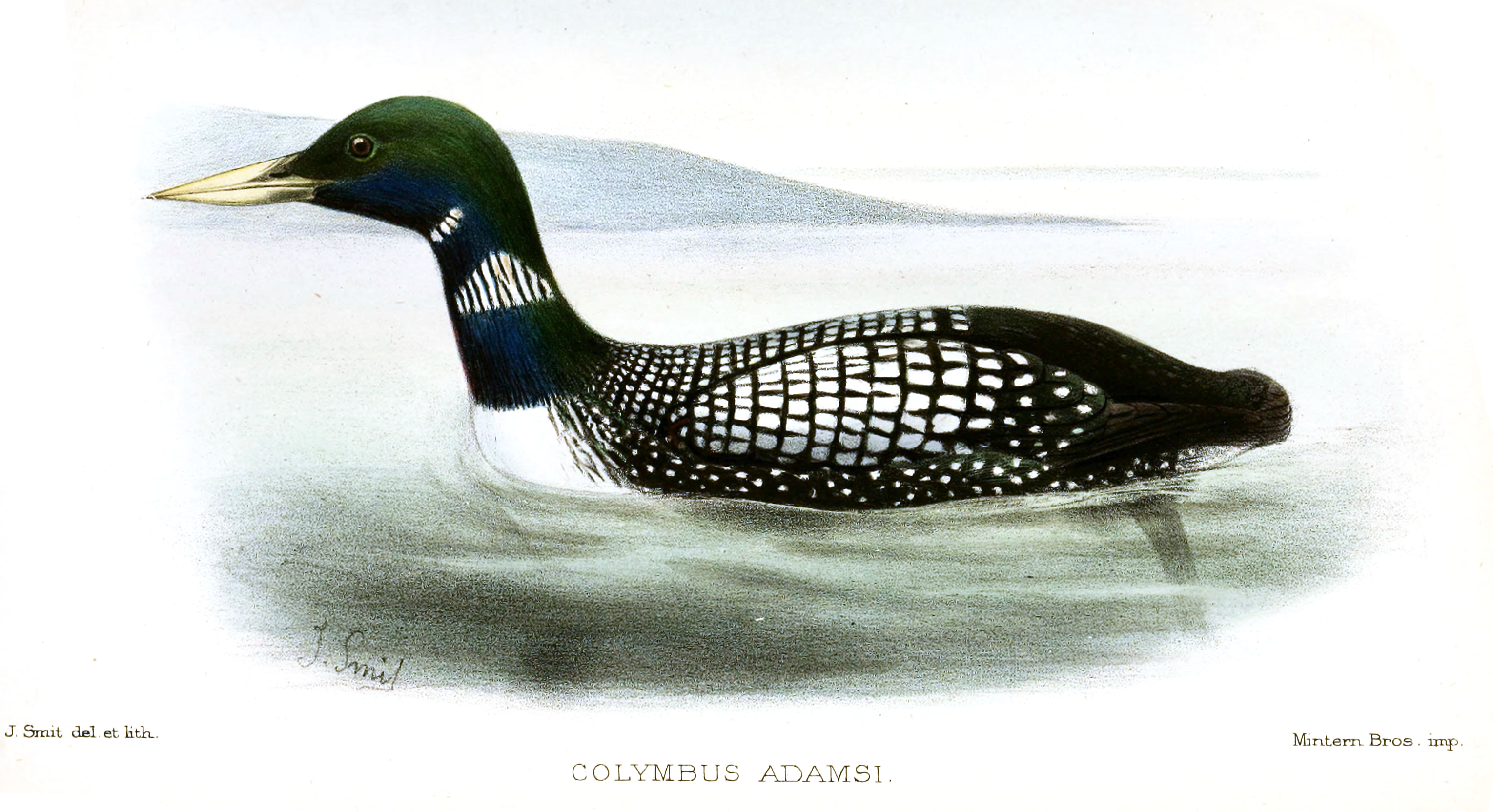

First described by English zoologist George Robert Gray in 1859 based on a specimen collected in Alaska, the yellow-billed loon is a monotypic species, with no subspecies despite its large Holarctic range. It is closely related to the common loon, which it strongly resembles in plumage and behaviour; some taxonomists consider the two species to be allopatric forms of the same superspecies. Both are thought to have evolved from a population of black-throated loons which colonized the Nearctic and were subsequently cut off from other populations.

The genus name Gavia comes from the Latin for "sea mew", as used by ancient Roman naturalist Pliny the Elder. The specific epithet adamsii honours Edward Adams, a British naval surgeon and naturalist who sketched and collected numerous species, including this one, on several trips to the Arctic. The word "loon" is thought to have derived from the Swedish lom, the Old Norse or Icelandic lómr, or the Old Dutch loen, all of which mean "lame" or "clumsy", and is a probable reference to the difficulty that all loons have in moving about on land. "Diver" refers to the family's underwater method of hunting for prey, while "yellow-billed" and "white-billed" are references to the bird's distinctively pale bill.

== Description ==
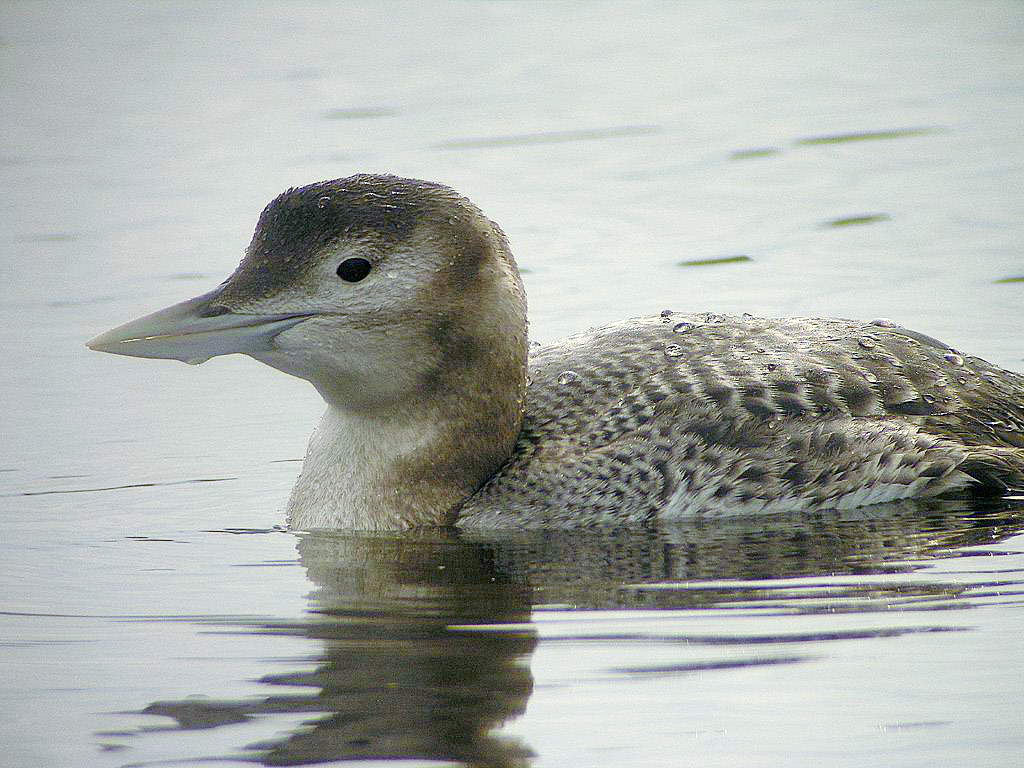
Juvenile

With a length of 76 to 97 cm (30 to 38 in), a wingspan of 135 to 160 cm (53 to 63 in), and a weight ranging from 4 to 6.4 kg (8.8 to 14.1 lb), the yellow-billed loon is the largest member of the loon (diver) family. The adult is primarily black and white in breeding plumage, with a purple gloss on its head and neck.

== Habitat and range ==
The yellow-billed loon is an Arctic species, breeding primarily along the coasts of the Arctic Ocean as far north as 78° N and wintering on sheltered coastal waters of the northern Pacific Ocean and the northwestern coast of Norway. It has been recorded as a breeding bird in Russia, Canada and the United States. Though it winters primarily to the north of 50° N, its winter range extends south to 35° N off the coast of Japan, and it has been recorded as a vagrant in more than 20 countries, including some as far south as Mexico and Spain.

== Behaviour ==
=== Breeding ===
Like other loons, it forms long-lasting pairs. Though it prefers freshwater pools or lakes in the tundra, the yellow-billed loon will also breed along rivers, estuaries or the coast in low-lying areas of the Arctic; in general, it avoids forested areas. Breeding typically starts in early June, though it is dependent on the timing of the spring thaw. Like all members of its family, the yellow-billed loon builds a nest of plant material very close to the edge of the water. Copulation occurs on land, without any specific courtship rituals. The pair defends its large territory intensively against intruders, but may later in the breeding season gang up with other birds on good fishing spots.

The female lays two eggs measuring 89 by 55 millimetres (3.5 by 2.2 in). The eggs are strongly oval and are a light purple-brown with darker blotches interspersed. This colour camouflages with the soil and vegetation that this bird nests near. Most of the time, however, the egg is not visible due to incubation, which takes around 27 to 29 days.

=== Feeding ===
The yellow-billed loon is a specialist fish eater, yet it also takes crustaceans, molluscs and annelids, especially for its young. It dives in pursuit of prey, which is caught underwater. Probably as a way to avoid spreading parasites, it defecates ashore, in the breeding lake.

== Conservation and Threats ==
In 2010, the International Union for the Conservation of Nature (IUCN) changed the status of the yellow-billed loon from Least Concern to Near Threatened, as the species appears to be in a "moderately rapid" population decline. An unsustainable level of subsistence harvesting by indigenous peoples was specifically named as the main threat.

The yellow-billed loon is one of the species to which the Agreement on the Conservation of African-Eurasian Migratory Waterbirds (AEWA) applies; in the Americas, it is protected by the Migratory Bird Treaty Act of 1918.

The yellow-billed loon is especially vulnerable due to its low fecundity and faces many threats related to its habitat. They need to live in areas with large, deep lakes, and these environments are threatened due to high rates of human interaction, such as oil drilling, and the warming climate of their natural habitats. They often nest near oil drilling equipment, posing a range of issues related to injury and exposure to crude oil. The warming climate causes them to leave their nests in search of cooler areas, leaving their nests, eggs, and young exposed to predation. They are also very territorial birds, and often face injuries that can result in death from fighting other organisms.

In March of 2024, a young yellow-billed loon made news headlines when it was spotted resting amongst the Fountains of Bellagio on the Las Vegas Strip in Nevada, US. The bird's initial landing in the fountain sparked concern among local bird experts, as the species is known to breed in the Arctic and is more typically seen along the Northern & Northwestern Pacific coastal areas, where it can feed on fish that swim in the waters along the Pacific Coast. Wildlife officials believe the bird got stuck in the Bellagio fountain after strong winds likely took the young yellow-billed off course during a weekend wind storm, leaving it without any fish to eat or enough space to fly out.

The young bird was not injured or hurt and was relocated to a bird sanctuary at an undisclosed, remote location, where it had food and space to take off when it was ready. Prior to this sighting, the last time a yellow-billed loon was spotted in Nevada was in 2018.

== Identification ==
- Appleby, R.H.; Madge, S.C.; Mullarney, Killian (1986). "Identification of divers in immature and winter plumages". British Birds. 79 (8): 365–391.
