= Prince of Wales Strait =

Strait in the Northwest Territories of Canada

Coordinates: 72°21′14″N 118°46′57″W

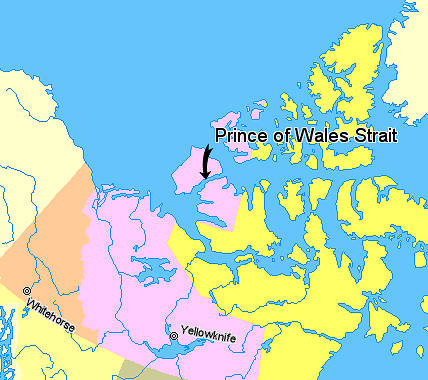
Prince of Wales Strait, Northwest Territories, Canada. Nunavut Northwest Territories Yukon Territory Regions outside Canada (Alaska, Greenland)

The Prince of Wales Strait is a strait in the Northwest Territories of Canada separating Banks Island to the northwest from Victoria Island to the southeast. It extends from Viscount Melville Sound in the northeast to Amundsen Gulf in the southwest. From late winter, it is filled by ice that usually does not break up until August, if at all. Its namesake, Prince of Wales Island, lies over 240 mi (390 km) to the east.

The strait is a possible route for the Northwest Passage. The Parry Channel leads 600 mi (970 km) west from Baffin Bay to the strait or M'Clure Strait to the northwest.

Robert McClure reached it from the west in 1850 and was frozen in. A sledge party showed that it was connected to Parry Channel;. However, he never traversed the strait; he declared confidently that the strait did connect over to the already-discovered Channel, and the coordinates he provided for the eastern exit of the strait were accurate. This is generally considered the epochal event of the discovery of the first Northwest Passage (in the geographical sense). It was nonetheless considered ice-bound and unsuitable for navigation. McClure ultimately made it across the Canadian Arctic and made the first circumnavigation of the Americas.

Richard Collinson again entered it in 1851. Henry Larson made the first passage in 1944 after failing to pass the M'Clure Strait. In 1969, the oil tanker SS Manhattan was forced to use it after the ice had blocked the M'Clure Strait. As the strait narrows to less than 24 mi (39 km), vessels using it pass within undisputed Canadian waters (see Arctic Archipelago).

== See also ==
- Deans Dundas Bay
