= M'Clure Strait =

Strait on the edge of the Canadian Northwest Territories

Coordinates: 74.7°N 117.0°W

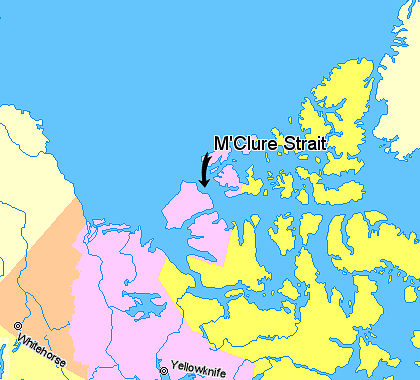
M'Clure Strait, Northwest Territories, Canada. Nunavut Northwest Territories Yukon Territory Regions outside Canada (Alaska, Greenland)

The M'Clure Strait (sometimes rendered McClure Strait) is a strait on the edge of the Canadian Northwest Territories. It forms the northwestern end of the Parry Channel which extends east all the way to Baffin Bay and is thus a possible route for the Northwest Passage. The strait was named for Robert McClure, an Irish Arctic explorer serving in the Royal Navy. He was the first man to traverse the North-West Passage (by boat and sledge).

The strait connects the Beaufort Sea in the west with Viscount Melville Sound in the east. It is bounded by Prince Patrick Island, Eglinton Island and Melville Island on the north and Banks Island on the south. As the strait is chronically blocked with thick ice, it is usually impassable to ships; in 1969, the United States-registered tanker SS Manhattan was freed from the ice by a Canadian icebreaker, and forced to travel through Canadian territorial waters to complete its westward passage. Ice prevented Manhattan from going through McClure Strait so the vessel sailed through the Prince of Wales Strait. There is a dispute between Canada and the United States over the waters of the Arctic Islands, other than those within 12 mi (19 km) of shore.

The M'Clure Strait became fully open (ice-free) in early August 2007, and again in August 2008. The European Space Agency reported that the Arctic's Northwest Passage opened up fully sea ice free, clearing a lane through the northern section of the historically impassable route between Europe and Asia.

At 15.33Z on August 29, 2012, the purpose-built Polar Bound under the command of David Scott Cowper with Jane Maufe as crew, was the first private yacht to pass through the strait. Shortly thereafter, the Hallberg-Rassy sailboat Belzebub II, with three sailors aboard, became the first sailboat to travel the route.

The M'Clure Strait lies within the M'Clure Rift which forms the western end of the Parry Submarine Rift Valley. It is considered an incipient rift zone because little extensional tectonism has taken place on it and no oceanic crust occurs in the middle of the strait.

== See also ==
- Territorial claims in the Arctic
