= HMS Resolute (1850) =

19th-century British Royal Navy barque

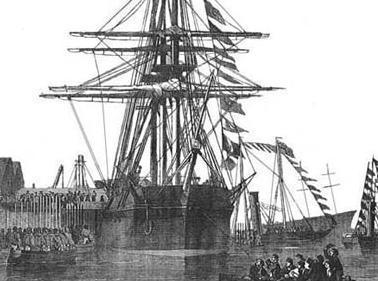
- An etching of HMS Resolute, December 1856

History

United Kingdom
- Name: Resolute
- Builder: T&W Smith of Newcastle, UK
- Laid down: 1849
- Launched: 1850
- Acquired: 1850
- Fate: Abandoned in 1854 after being left locked in Arctic ice

United States
- Acquired: 1855, found adrift in ice
- Fate: Restored and returned to the UK as a gift in 1856

United Kingdom
- Acquired: 1856
- Stricken: 1879
- Fate: Broken up

General characteristics
- Tons burthen: 424 bm
- Length: 115 ft (35 m)
- Beam: 28.5 ft (8.7 m)
- Sail plan: 3-masted barque

HMS Resolute was a barque-rigged ship of the British Royal Navy, specially outfitted for Arctic exploration. Resolute became trapped in the ice searching for Franklin's lost expedition and was abandoned in 1854. Recovered by an American whaler, she was returned to Queen Victoria in 1856. Timbers from the ship were later used to construct the Resolute desk which was presented to the President of the United States and is currently located in the White House Oval Office.

== History ==
In the face of rising concerns regarding the fate of the Arctic expedition of Sir John Franklin, having left Britain in 1845 in search of the North West Passage, the British Government sent expeditions in 1848 in search of the expedition. With few existing warships deemed suitable, six merchant ships were purchased between 1848 and 1850 and soon converted to exploration ships: two steamships, HMS Pioneer and HMS Intrepid, the other four (Resolute, Assistance, Enterprise and Investigator) seagoing sailing ships. The first ship to set sail in search of Franklin was HMS Herald, and at the helm, Captain Henry Kellett. Herald went through the Bering Strait to search the western reaches of the Canadian Arctic. In 1850, HMS Investigator, Captain McClure, and HMS Enterprise, Captain Collinson were sent to the Arctic from the west.

Resolute, formerly known as the barque Ptarmigan, was purchased on 21 February 1850 and renamed a month later. Fitted for Arctic service by the Blackwall Civilian Shipyard Blackwall Yard, the refitting included installation of strong timbers, an internal heating system, and a polar bear as a figurehead.

During 1850–51, Resolute (flagship), Assistance, Pioneer and Intrepid, sailed the eastern Arctic under the command of Horatio Thomas Austin. The expedition found traces of Franklin's first winter camp on Beechey Island.

During the winter months, from October 1850 to March 1851, Second Master George F. McDougall, from Resolute and Lieutenant Sherard Osborn of Intrepid published five accounts in The Illustrated Arctic News, in what the editors identified as the "Barrow Strait". Upon returning the Resolute to her home port in England, the manuscript paper was printed in London in 1852. Atwood (1997) references extant copies of the papers at both the British Museum and the Scott Polar Research Institute, Cambridge.

=== Belcher Expedition ===
After returning to England, the squadron assigned to Austin received provisions and was placed under the command of Sir Edward Belcher. The Belcher Expedition was augmented by the addition of a fifth ship, North Star that remained at Beechey Island as a depot ship. Belcher's orders contained the following objectives: to find Franklin, or evidence regarding his fate by broadening the search to the Eastern Canadian Arctic; and to split the expedition at Beechey Island and send Resolute and Intrepid west in search of Franklin, as well as secure provisions for Investigator and Enterprise. The expedition left England in April 1852, and later crossed Baffin Bay westward in August 1852. After the rendezvous of the five ships at Beechey Island, splitting the squadron was necessary. The flagship Assistance and her steam tender, Pioneer, headed north up Wellington Channel. Resolute, then under Captain Kellett, and her steam tender, Intrepid, headed west and North Star remained at Beechey Island. In 1852, of the seven Royal Navy ships searching the Arctic, only Enterprise found traces of Franklin's expedition in the form of a small quantity of timber on the eastern coast of Victoria Island.

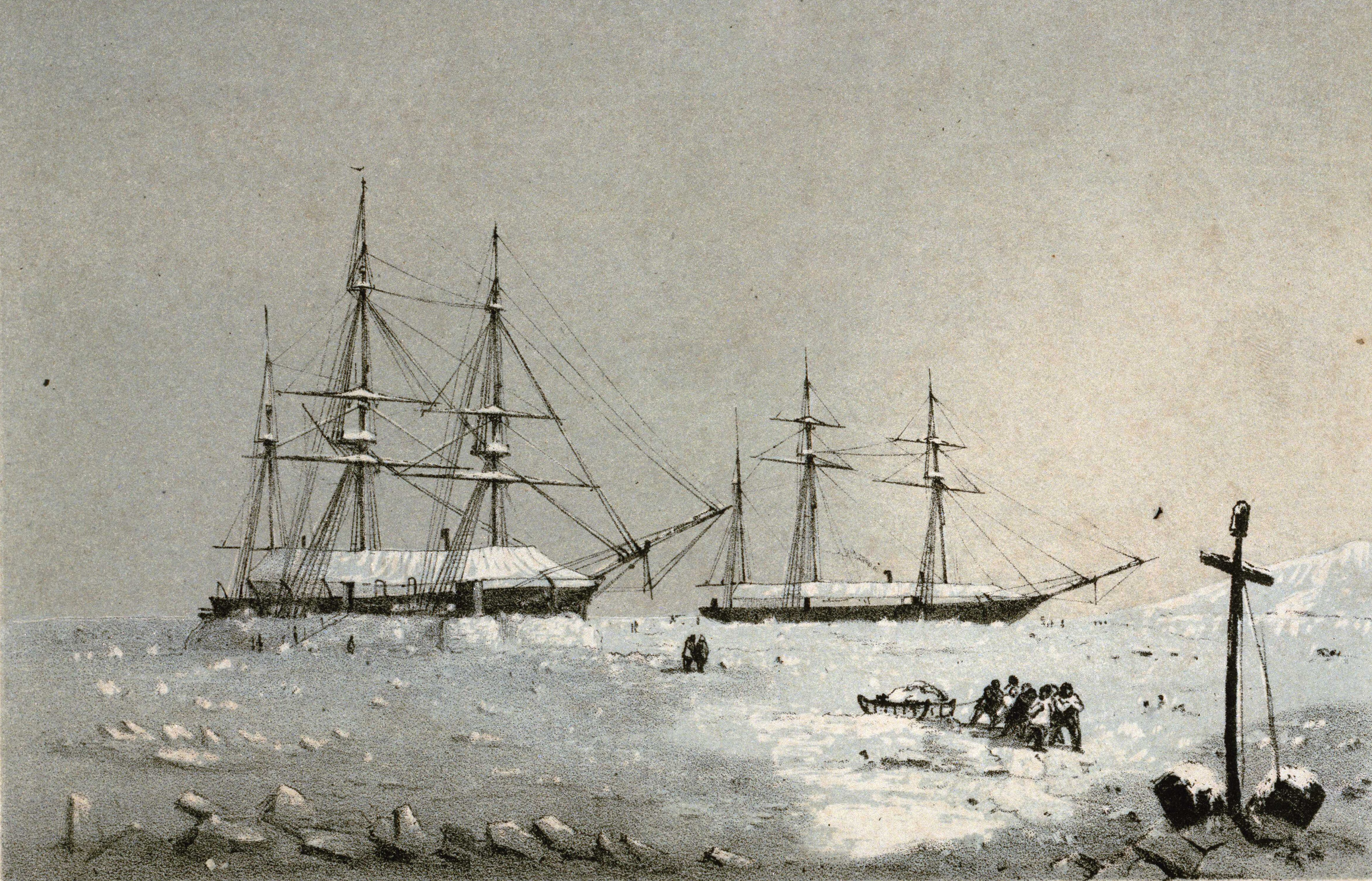
HMS Resolute and HMS Intrepid winter quarters, at Melville Island, 1852–53. Drawn by George Frederick McDougall, sailing master on Resolute.

The crew of Resolute set up winter camp and a temporary dock on the stationary land ice of Dealy Island near the north shore of Viscount Melville Sound. During the spring and summer of 1853, the crews of Resolute and Intrepid sledged aboard in search of clues to Franklin's whereabouts in hope to locate Investigator and Enterprise. They found neither Franklin nor Enterprise, but did succeed in finding and rescuing Captain McClure and his crew upon the ice-bound ship, HMS Investigator in April 1853. Captain Kellett ordered McClure to abandon Investigator due to the ship being frozen in ice since 1850. The lack of a proper spring and summer thaw kept the ship at bay. The conditions caused severe hardship for the crew, forcing the crew to reduce their rations for over a year. Before winter set in, and while passage remained open at Dealy Island, the 1852–53 winter camp was dissolved and Resolute and Intrepid sailed eastward. In August 1853, a cold front caused the open passage to freeze, encasing Resolute in ice. Since the flow direction of the water, and therefore the ice, was from the west to the east, Resolute moved east at about 1.5 nautical miles (2.8 km; 1.7 mi) per day. The crew prepared the ship for the winter by stowing her sails and upper rigging below deck. Resolute was still beset by this floe ice in the spring of 1854. In April, Belcher ordered Captain Kellett to abandon Resolute. Despite his protest, Kellett obeyed orders and prepared the ship for winter. In May, Captain Kellett left Resolute locked in the slowly moving floe ice, and led his men in a hard march across the ice to reach the ships of the expedition at Beechey Island. Their number included the officers and crew of Investigator, rescued by Kellett in the spring of 1853, and the men from Intrepid and Resolute.

Two of the other main vessels of Belcher's fleet were abandoned, the flagship Assistance and her steam tender, Pioneer. Belcher arrived at Beechey Island between May–August 1854. The men were divided into roles as crew to North Star and two relief ships: HMS Phoenix and HMS Talbot, which arrived at Beechey Island just as the overcrowded North Star was about to sail. The men left Beechey Island on 29 August 1854.

The British Government announced in The London Gazette that the ships, including Resolute, were still Her Majesty's property, but no salvage was attempted.

On 10 September 1855, the abandoned Resolute was found adrift by the American whaler George Henry, captained by James Buddington of Groton, Connecticut in an ice floe off Cape Walsingham of Baffin Island, 1,200 miles (1,900 km) from where she had been abandoned. An October 1856, New York Journal article relates Captain Sidney O. Budington and crew's encounter:

Finally, stealing over the side, they found everything stowed away in proper order for desertion—spars hauled up to one side and bound, boats piled together, and hatches closed. Everything wore the silence of the tomb. Finally reaching the cabin door they broke in, and found their way in the darkness to the table. On it they accidentally turned on a box of lucifer matches; in a moment one was ignited, the glowing light revealed a candle; it was lit and before the astonished gaze of these men exposed a scene that appeared to be rather one of enchantment than reality. Upon a massive table was a metal teapot, glistening as if new, also a large volume of Scott's family Bible, together with glasses and decanters filled with choice liquors. Near by was Captain Kellett's chair, a piece of massive furniture, over which had been thrown, as if to protect this seat from vulgar occupation, the royal flag of Great Britain.

Buddington split his crew, and took 13 men with him on the Resolute. He arrived home in New London, Connecticut on Christmas Eve.

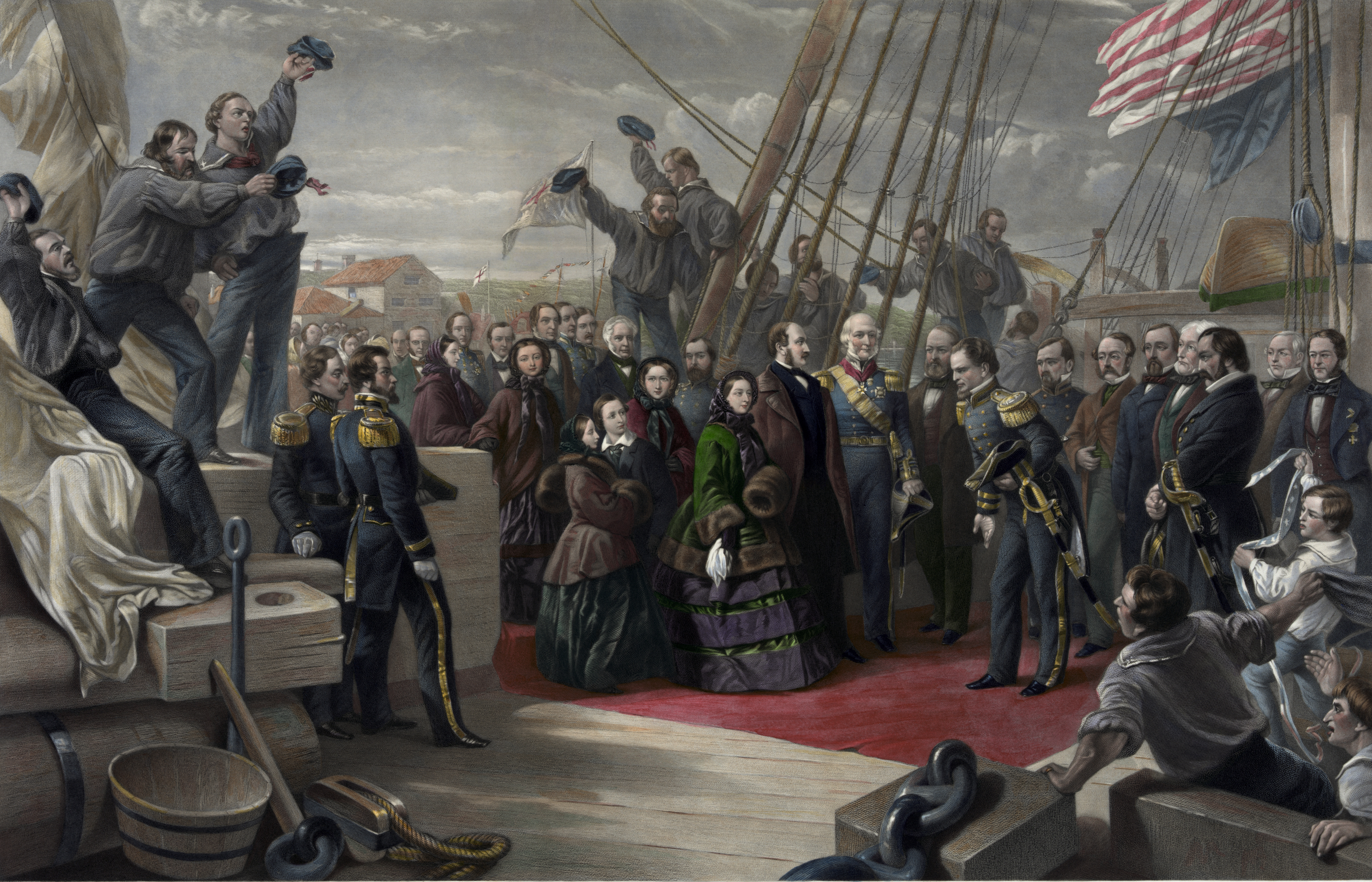
Queen Victoria visits Resolute, 16 December 1856, after its rediscovery and return to the British by the Americans.

Although most of the expeditions in search of the lost Franklin expedition, before 1856, were funded by either the British government or by public subscription from within the British Empire, two expeditions were funded by Henry Grinnell, a New York merchant and shipowner in New Bedford, in addition to the assistance offered by the United States Government. Senator James Mason of Virginia presented Congress with the bill to restore Resolute and return her to England as a gesture of "national courtesy". Grinnell wrote in support of this bill. The United States Congress purchased the Resolute for $40,000. Once refitted, Commander Henry J. Hartstene sailed Resolute to England to present the ship to Queen Victoria on 13 December 1856, at East Cowes as a token of comity.

Both Grinnell and Lady Jane Franklin hoped the restored Resolute would once again be employed for a new expedition in search of the Franklin expedition. Evidence found by John Rae proved beyond reasonable doubt that the crew had suffered harsh conditions that led to their deaths. The British Government declined. Lady Franklin organized a private expedition under Francis Leopold McClintock, who, in 1859, located the only written account of the fate of Franklin.

Resolute served in the Royal Navy from 1856, but never left home waters. Retired in 1879, Resolute was later salvaged for timber. The Canadian settlement of Resolute, Nunavut, is named after the ship. In March 2009, British Prime Minister Gordon Brown presented US President Barack Obama with the framed commission of Resolute, and a pen holder made from the wood of another Royal Navy ship, HMS Gannet.

== The Resolute desks ==
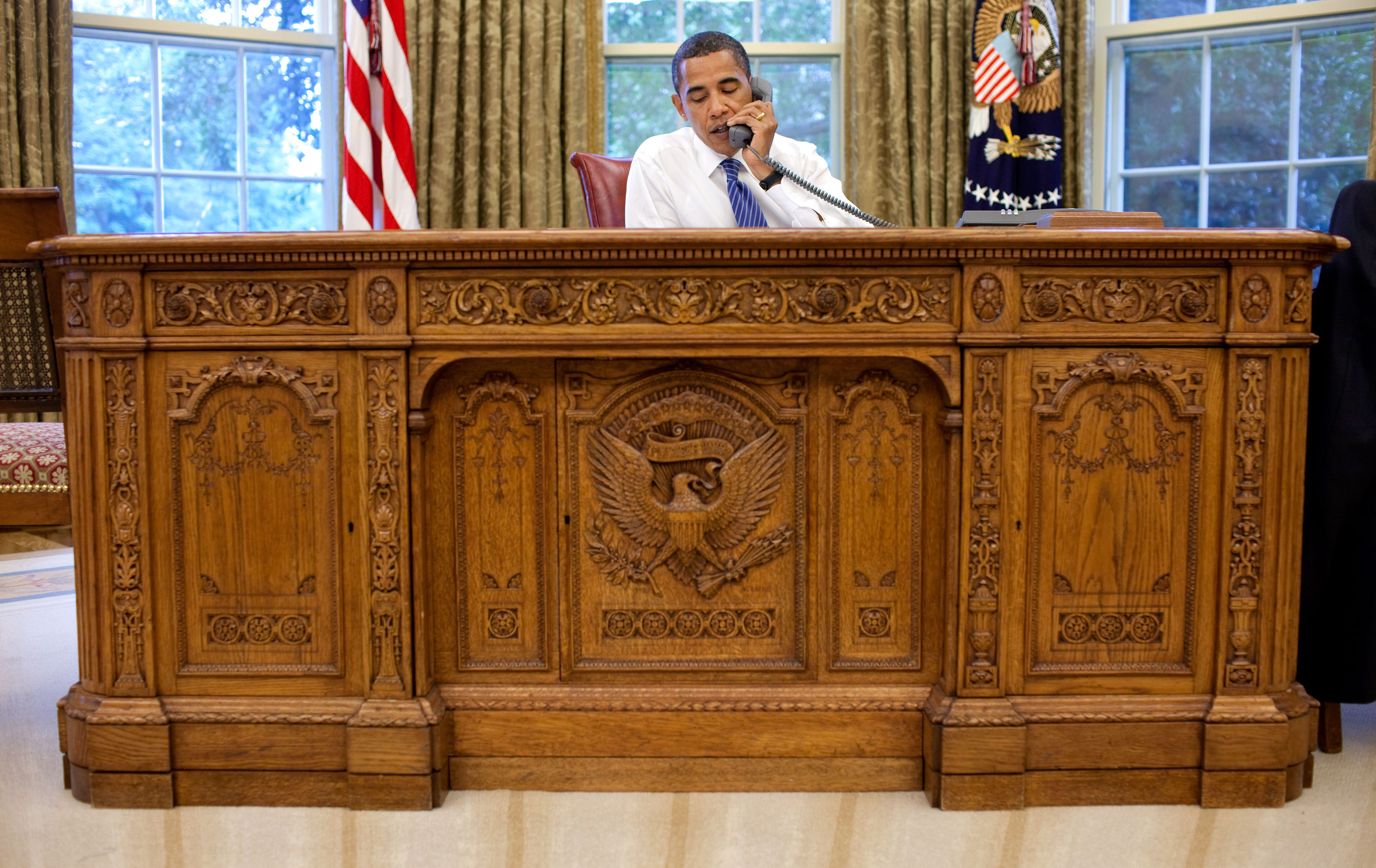
President Barack Obama sitting at the Resolute desk in 2009

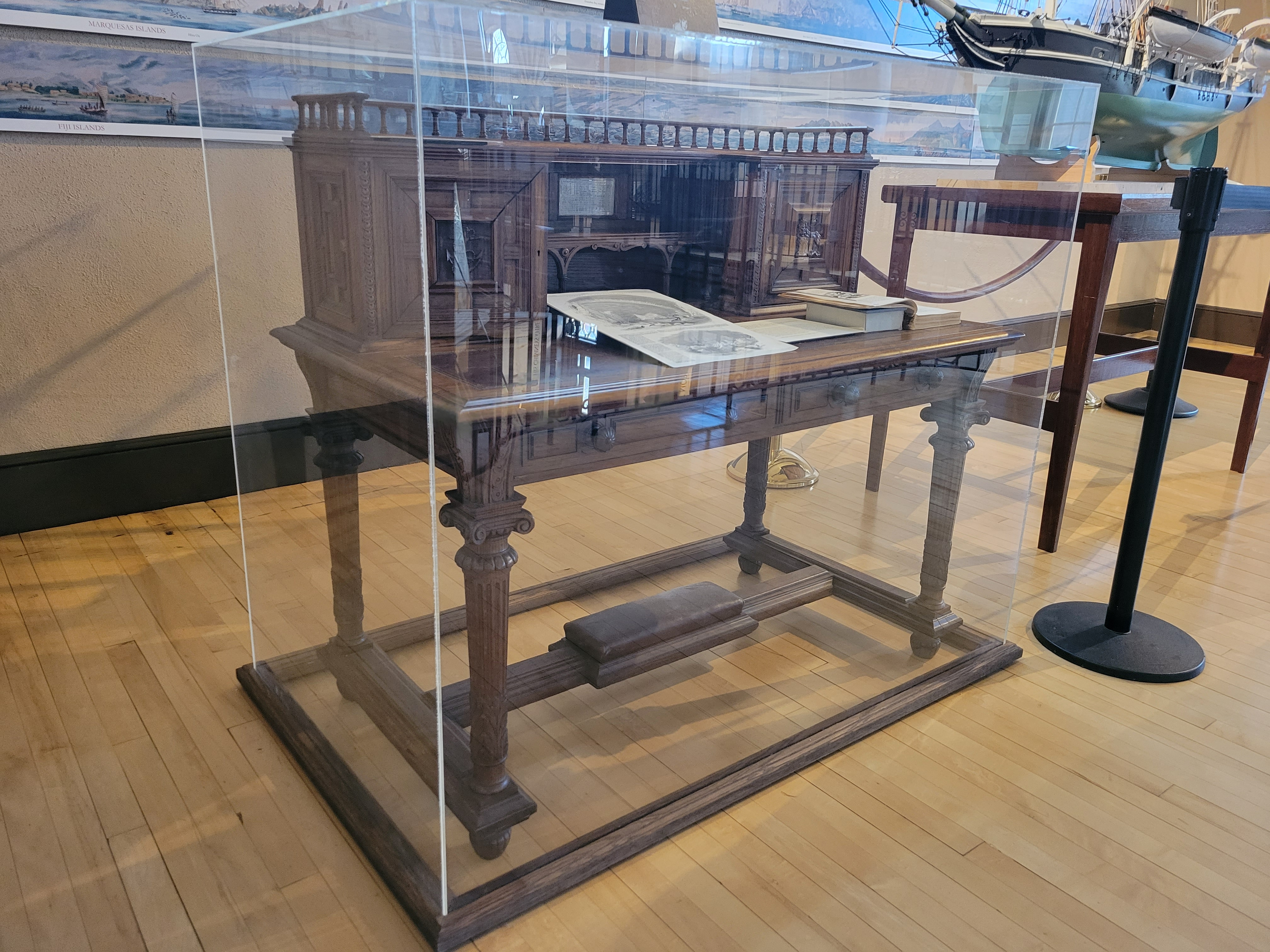
The Grinnell desk on display at the New Bedford Whaling Museum

The British government ordered at least four desks to be made from the timbers of the ship, and they were constructed by cabinetmakers at the Joiner's Shop of Chatham Dockyard. A large partner's desk was presented to U.S. President Rutherford B. Hayes in 1880 as a gesture of thanks for the rescue and return of Resolute. Since then, this desk—known as the Resolute desk—has been used by every American President in some capacity except Lyndon Johnson, Richard Nixon, and Gerald Ford. Eight Presidents have used it as their official desk in the Oval Office starting with John F. Kennedy, but some have had it in their private study in the Executive Residence.

A second desk, called the Grinnell Desk or the Queen Victoria Desk, was also made from the timbers of HMS Resolute. This smaller lady's desk was presented to the widow of Henry Grinnell in 1880 in recognition of her husband's generous contributions to the search for Franklin. In 1983, it was given to the New Bedford Whaling Museum and is in their collection in New Bedford, Massachusetts.

A third desk, or more accurately a writing table, was commissioned by Queen Victoria; it remains part of the Royal Collection.

== HMS Resolute in popular media ==
- HMS Resolute's story is an integral clue in the plot of the film National Treasure: Book of Secrets. The relevance of the two desks to the discovery of further clues is concealed in the version of the Statue of Liberty upon the Île aux Cygnes in Paris, France. The aphorism "These twins stand resolute to preserve what we are looking for" refers to the twin Resolute desks made from the ship's timbers, with one located in The White House and the other in the National Museum of the Royal Navy at Portsmouth (though in the film, the desk is located in Buckingham Palace).
- The book Resolute, by Martin Sandler, tells the story, with historical accuracy, of all the different expeditions tied to the one by John Franklin, HMS Resolute being one of them.
