= HMS Investigator (1848) =

Merchant ship used in Arctic exploration

Coordinates: 74.084397°N 119.002619°W

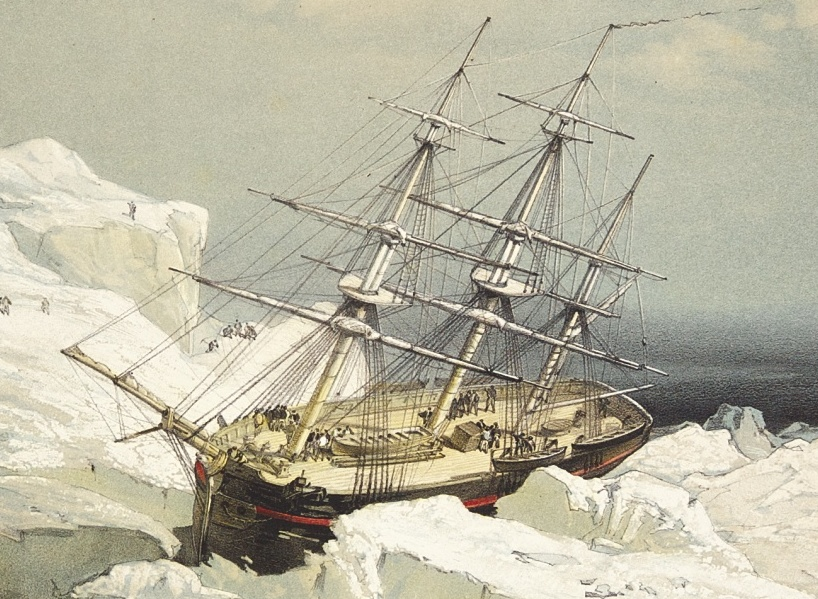
- HMS Investigator stuck in ice in August 1851, depicted by the ship's artist Samuel Gurney Cresswell

History

United Kingdom
- Name: Investigator
- Operator: Royal Navy
- Builder: Scotts Shipbuilding Company
- Cost: £25,337
- Acquired: February 1848
- Abandoned: 3 June 1853

General characteristics
- Class & type: Survey vessel
- Tons burthen: 422–480 tons BOM
- Length: 118 ft (36 m)
- Beam: 28 1/4 ft (8.6 m)
- Depth of hold: 18 11/12 ft (5.8 m)
- Sail plan: Barque-rigged

HMS Investigator was a merchant ship purchased in 1848 to search for Sir John Franklin's ill-fated Northwest Passage expedition. She made two voyages to the Arctic and had to be abandoned in 1853, after becoming trapped in the pack ice.

Her wreckage was found in July 2010, off Banks Island in the Beaufort Sea. She was the fourth ship of the Royal Navy to bear the name.

== Characteristics ==
Built at Scotts Shipbuilding and Engineering Company of Greenock on the Firth of Clyde, and running 422 tonnes, Investigator was purchased by the Admiralty in February 1848 and was fitted for Arctic exploration by R. & H. Green at Blackwall Yard on the River Thames.

She was strengthened for Arctic service by William M. Rice, master shipwright of Woolwich Dockyard. She was extensively strengthened with timber—teak, English oak, Canadian elm—and 5/16 in (8 mm) steel plating. Ten pairs of wrought iron diagonal riders were set in the hold, with ten pairs of diagonal plates on the sides of the vessel between decks.

To cope with snow and ice loads, the upper decks were doubled with 3 in (76 mm) fir planking. Preston's Patent Ventilating Illuminators were installed to improve light and ventilation. Charles Sylvester's warming apparatus, a modern stove system capable of warming the entire ship, was also employed with good results. The same or similar device had been used by William Edward Parry in 1821, to prevent condensation and aerate the lowest deck.

== Career ==
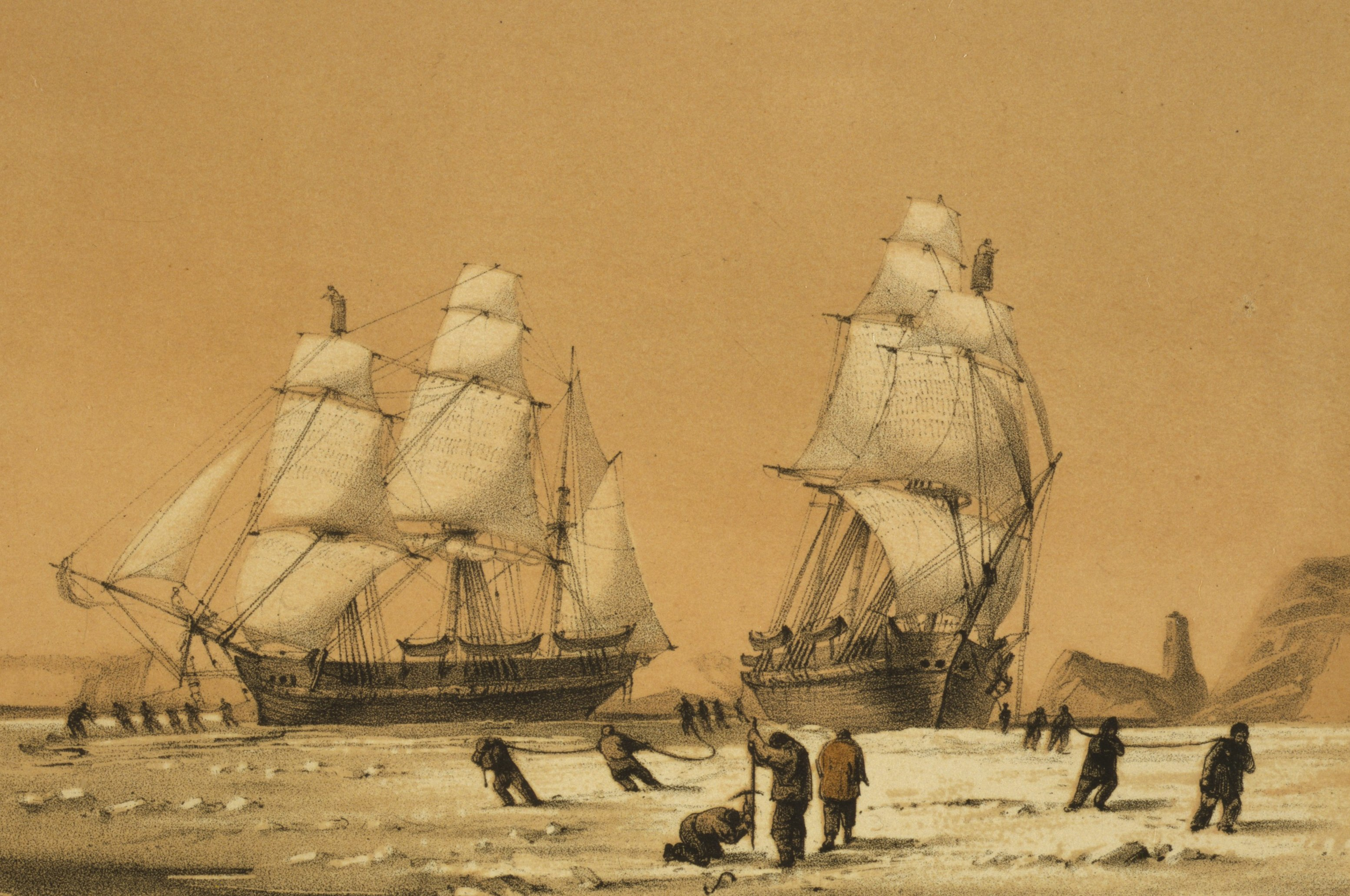
HMS Enterprise and HMS Investigator (right), by Lieutenant W.H. Browne

In 1848, she accompanied HMS Enterprise on James Clark Ross's expedition to find Franklin's lost expedition. Also aboard Investigator on this expedition was the naturalist Edward Adams. On a separate expedition she was commanded by Robert McClure, but the ship became trapped in the pack ice at Mercy Bay adjoining Banks Island. The decision was eventually taken to abandon her on 3 June 1853, after she had been stuck for nearly three years.

The following year, she was inspected by crews of HMS Resolute, still frozen in, and reported to be in generally fair condition despite having taken on some water during the summer thaw.

Unlike the loss of Erebus and Terror, the events surrounding Investigator's abandonment are not a mystery. McClure provided an official account of the journey, and the ship's surgeon, Alexander Armstrong, published an unofficial account in 1857. However, the exact location of her wreckage remained unknown for over 150 years because of difficulties in reaching the area, which is extremely inhospitable and frequently iced over.

== Legacy ==
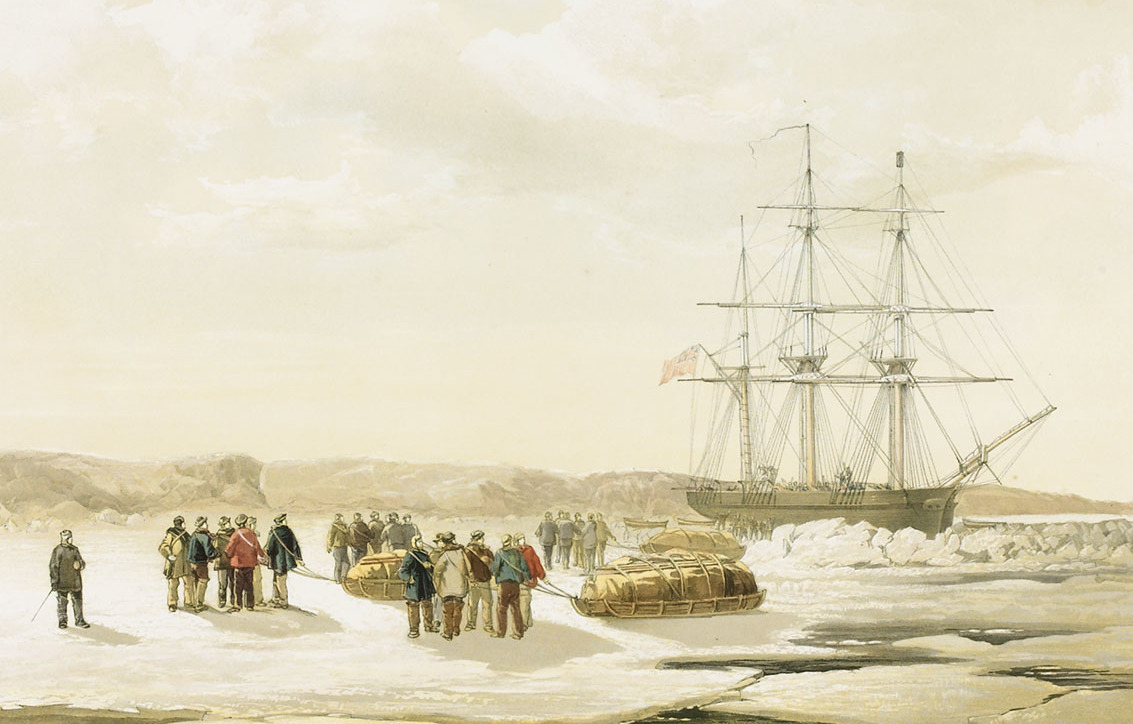
Invalids are evacuated from HMS Investigator in Mercy Bay, by Samuel Gurney Cresswell, the ship's artist, who commanded the sledge party depicted.

Oral traditions of the Inuit tell stories of the ship. The abandoned ship was a source of copper and iron for the indigenous people in the area; metal nails were missing from smaller boats on the shore when they were discovered. One Inuit account from 1910 noted that "one year she had still been on the beach and the next year she was gone without a trace." When Canadian anthropologist Vilhjalmur Stefansson reached Mercy Bay during his 1915 voyage to the Arctic, he failed to find her remains.

After meeting the Inuit who made pilgrimages to the wreckage, he suggested a link between the Investigator's stranding and the absence of muskoxen on Banks Island. He speculated that the Inuit had killed off the animals for food during their journeys to and from the wreckage over the 40 years since abandonment. The muskoxen have since repopulated the island and now number nearly 50,000.

== Discovery of wreck ==
In July 2010, a team of Parks Canada scientists, archaeologists, and surveyors began searching for the sunken wreck of the Investigator in Mercy Bay at the northern tip of Aulavik National Park. It was the first expedition to specifically search for the ship. The team arrived on Banks Island in the Beaufort Sea on 22 July and began a sonar scan of the area three days later, based on the original Royal Navy records of the position of the ship when it was abandoned. Its remains were quickly discovered, 150 m (490 ft) off the north shore of Banks Island, with the deck of the ship about 8 m (26 ft) below the surface.

According to a superintendent with Parks Canada, the ship was found "sitting upright in silt; the three masts have been removed, probably by ice." Her hull lies partially buried in silt and the cold Arctic water has prevented the outer deck from deteriorating quickly. There are no plans to raise the ship's remains, although the team did send a remotely operated underwater vehicle to take photos and assess the wreckage.

== Bibliography ==
- Armstrong, A. (1857). A personal narrative of the discovery of the North-west Passage. London: Hurst and Blackett. OCLC 2060040.
- Cohen, A. (2013). Lost beneath the ice: the story of HMS Investigator. Toronto: Dundurn Press. ISBN 9781459719491.
- Colledge, J.; Warlow, B. (2006). Ships of the Royal Navy: complete record of all fighting ships. London: Chatham Publishing. ISBN 9781861762818.
- McClure, R. (1856). Osborn, S. (ed.). The discovery of the North-west Passage. London: Longman, Brown, Green, and Longmans. OCLC 77373360.
- Payton, B. (2009). The ice passage: a true story of ambition, disaster, and endurance in the Arctic wilderness. Toronto: Doubleday Canada. ISBN 9780385665322.
- Stefansson, V. (1922). The friendly arctic: the story of five years in polar regions. New York: The Macmillan Company. OCLC 697768450.
- Winfield, R.; Lyon, D. (2004). The sail and steam navy list: all the ships of the Royal Navy, 1815–1889. London: Chatham Publishing. ISBN 9781861760326.
