= HMS Enterprise (1848) =

Arctic exploration ship in the Royal Navy

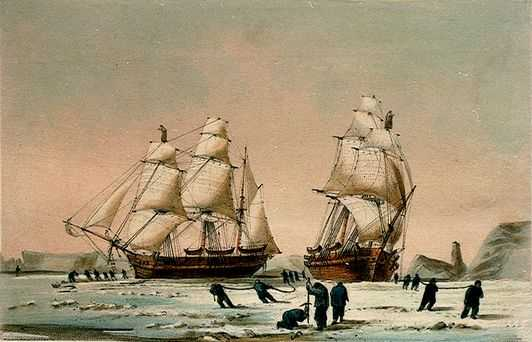
- HMS Enterprise (left) and HMS Investigator (right)

History

United Kingdom
- Name: Enterprise
- Builder: Money Wigram and Sons, Blackwall
- Cost: £24,545
- Launched: 5 April 1848
- Acquired: Purchased February 1848 on stocks
- Fate: Coal depot 1860; Lent to the Board of Trade; Sold 15 September 1903

General characteristics
- Class & type: Arctic Discovery Ship
- Tonnage: 471 tons (Builder's Measure)
- Length: 125.6 ft (38.3 m)
- Beam: 28.8 ft (8.8 m)
- Depth of hold: 20 ft (6.1 m)
- Sail plan: Barque-rigged

HMS Enterprise was an Arctic discovery ship laid down as a merchant vessel and purchased in 1848 before launch to search for Sir John Franklin's lost expedition. She made two Arctic voyages before becoming a coal depot, and was finally sold in 1903. She was the tenth Enterprise (or Enterprize) to serve in the Royal Navy.

== Construction ==
She was laid down as a merchant vessel at the Blackwall yard on the River Thames of Money Wigram and Sons, but purchased by the Admiralty in February 1848 and fitted for Arctic exploration. She was launched on 5 April 1848.

== Career ==
Enterprise made two voyages to the Arctic, the first via the Atlantic in 1848-1849 under James Clark Ross, then in 1850-1854 via the Pacific and the Bering Strait in an expedition led by Richard Collinson. From 1860 she was lent to the Commissioners of Northern Lights for use as a coal hulk at Oban, and from 1889 she was lent to the Board of Trade. She was sold in 1903.

== Bibliography ==
- Arctic Hell-Ship : the voyage of HMS Enterprise, 1850-1855 by William Barr, University of Alberta Press, USA, 2007, ISBN 0-88864-482-5
