= Banks Island =

Inhabited island in the Northwest Territories, Canada

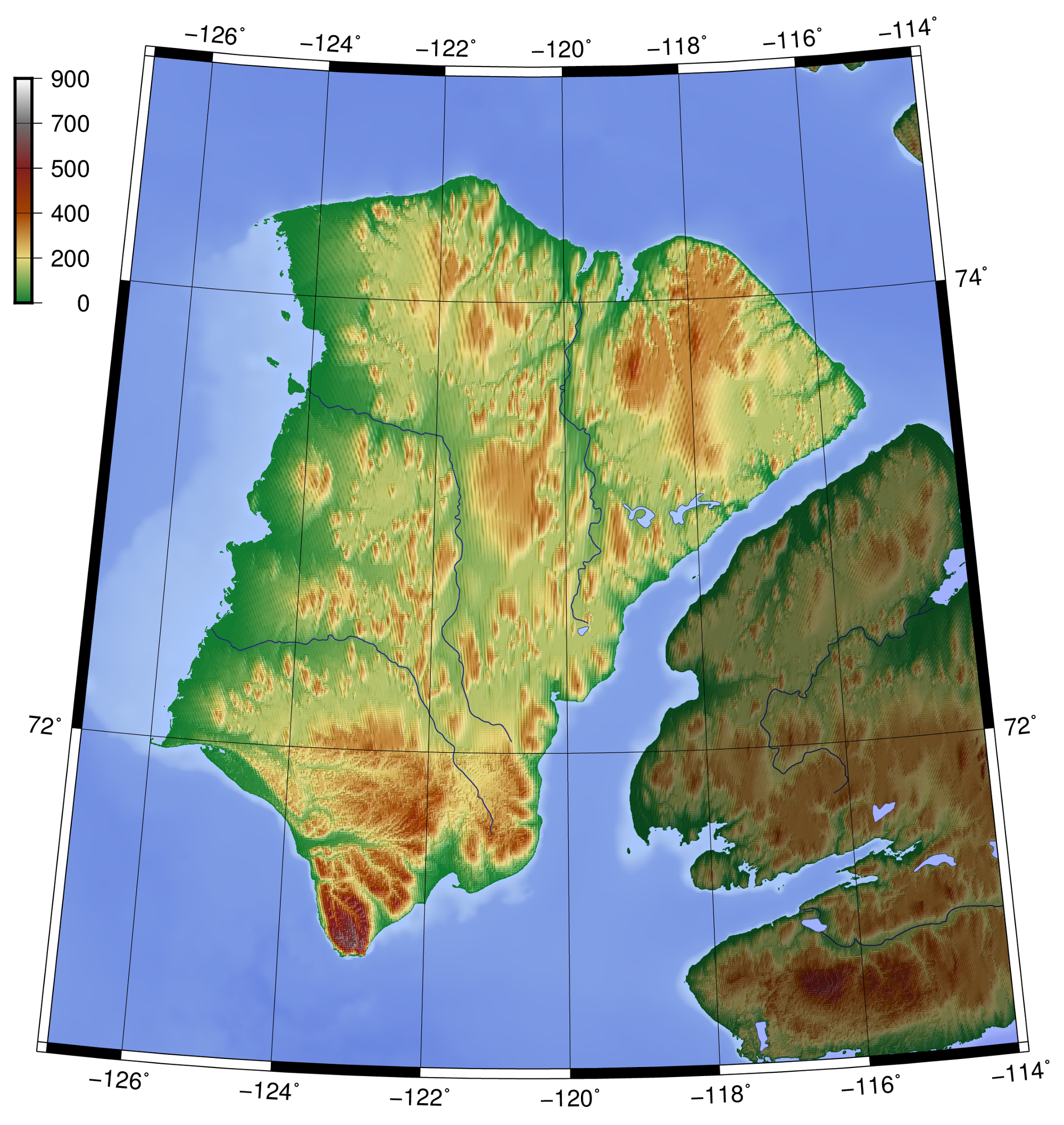
- Topography of Banks Island

- Location within Northwest Territories Location within Canada
- Interactive map of Banks Island

Geography
- Location: Beaufort Sea
- Coordinates: 72°45′02″N 121°30′10″W
- Archipelago: Arctic Archipelago
- Area: 70,191.02 km^{2} (27,100.90 sq mi) (2026)
- Area rank: 5th in Canada & 24th worldwide
- Length: 380 km (236 mi)
- Width: 290 km (180 mi)
- Highest elevation: 730 m (2400 ft)
- Highest point: Durham Heights

Administration
- Canada
- Territory: Northwest Territories
- Largest settlement: Sachs Harbour (pop. 104)

Demographics
- Population: 104 (2021)
- Pop. density: 0.001485/km^{2} (0.003846/sq mi)

Banks Island is one of the larger members of the Arctic Archipelago. Situated in the Inuvik Region, and part of the Inuvialuit Settlement Region, of the Northwest Territories, Canada. It is separated from Victoria Island to the east by the Prince of Wales Strait and from the mainland by Amundsen Gulf to its south. The Beaufort Sea lies to its west, and to its northeast M'Clure Strait separates the island from Prince Patrick Island and Melville Island. It is home to at least fourteen mammal species including the Peary caribou, barren-ground caribou, and polar bears. At one time over 68,000 muskoxen lived on the island, the majority of the world's population. However, the bacterium Erysipelothrix rhusiopathiae has led to a sharp decline in their numbers. The island is the summer home to hundreds of thousands of migratory birds who nest at Banks Island Migratory Bird Sanctuary No. 1 and Banks Island Migratory Bird Sanctuary No. 2. As of the 2021 census it had a population of 104, all living in Sachs Harbour.

== Human settlements and discoveries ==
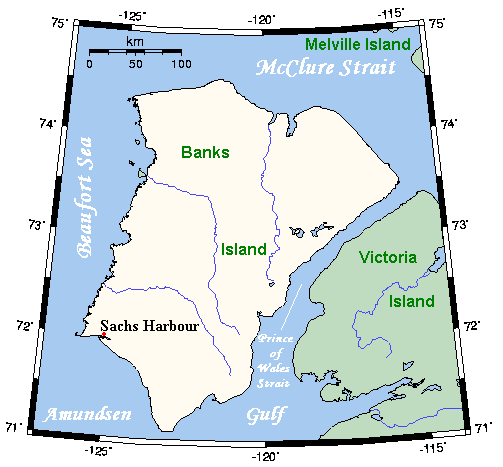
Closer look at Banks Island

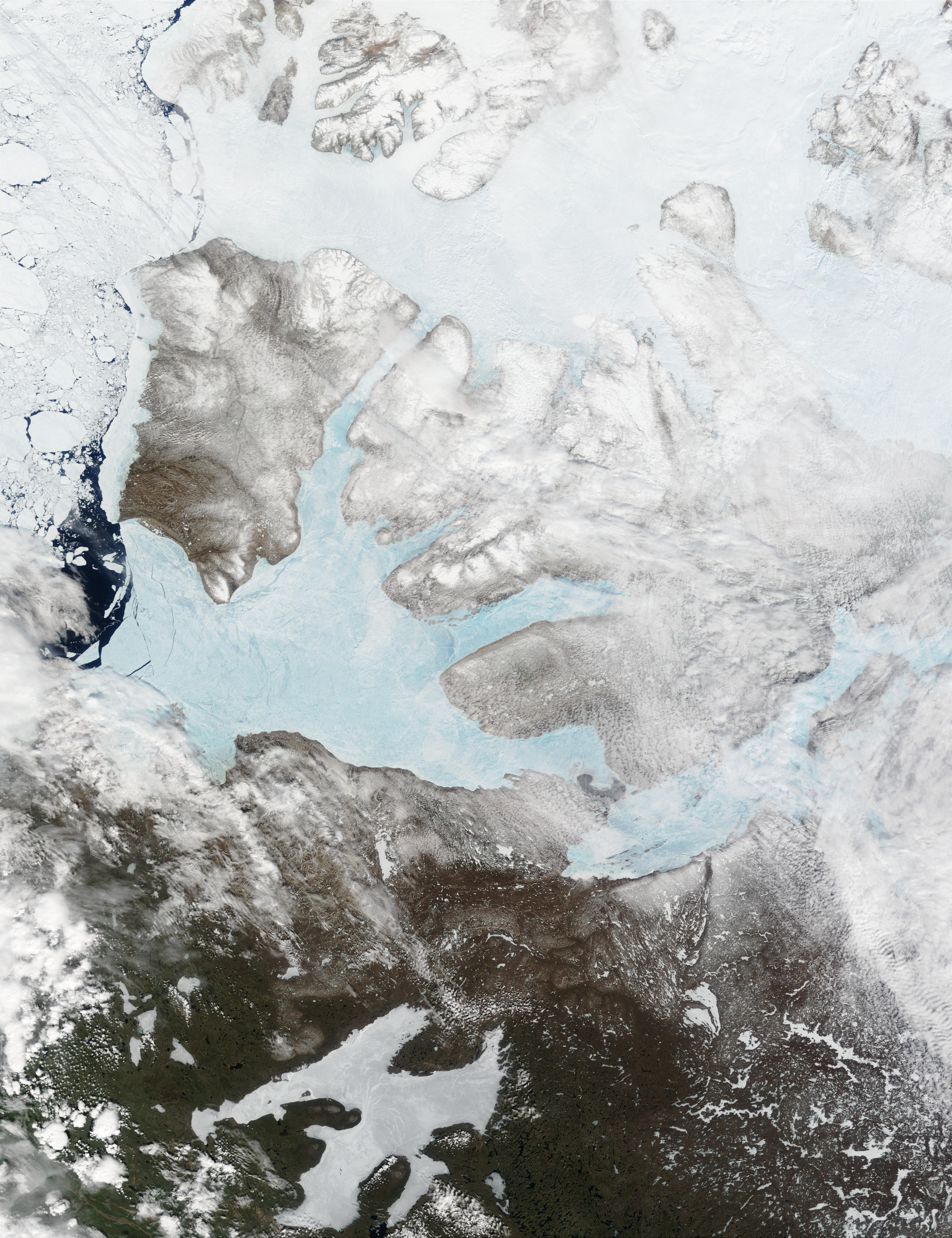
These moderate resolution imaging spectroradiometer images from June 14 and 16, 2002, show Banks Island (left) and the larger Victoria Island (right)

Pre-Dorset cultural sites have been found that date from approximately 1500 BCE but European contact came much later. In 1820 it was seen from Melville Island by Sir William Edward Parry and named "Banks Land" in honour of Sir Joseph Banks. However, during the later exploration of the area by the McClure Arctic expedition the island was marked on their maps as "Baring Island". McClure's ship, HMS Investigator, was frozen in Prince of Wales Strait. That spring he sent out sledging parties and determined that Banks Island was an island. In the following year he almost circumnavigated the island but was again frozen in at Mercy Bay where he and his crew spent the next three months before making their escape across the ice. The only permanent settlement on the island is the Inuvialuit hamlet of Sachs Harbour (Ikahuak), on the southwest coast.

== Description ==
Banks Island covers an area 70,191.02 km^{2} (27,100.90 sq mi) and it is the world's 24th largest island and Canada's fifth largest island. It is about 380 km (240 mi) long, and at its widest point at the northern end, 290 km (180 mi) across. The highest point of the island is in the south, Durham Heights and rises to about 730 m (2,400 ft).

== Ecology ==
The island is treeless, with the tallest plant, the Arctic willow, growing occasionally to about the height of a person's knee but usually standing no taller than 10 cm (3.9 in). Banks Island is home to a large colony of lesser snow geese, which make their way across the Amundsen Gulf from the mainland. There is an annual goose hunt in the spring out of Sachs Harbour. The island is part of the tundra world biome, which has extremely cold winters. The island is home to barren-ground caribou, polar bears, muskoxen, and birds, including year round residents the common raven and ptarmigan. Two federal migratory bird sanctuaries were founded on the island in 1961. Aulavik National Park of Canada, a fly-in park, protects about 12,274 km^{2} (4,739 sq mi) of Arctic lowlands at the northern end of the island. The park has the highest concentration of muskoxen on earth, and is home to the endangered Peary caribou. The Thomsen River runs through the park, and is one of the northernmost navigable rivers (by canoe) in North America. Ptarmigan and ravens are considered the only year-round birds in the park, although 43 species make seasonal use of the area. In Inuvialuktun, Aulavik means "place where people travel" and the "wildlife and land have supported aboriginal peoples for more than 3,400 years, from Pre-Dorset cultures to contemporary Inuvialuit." The first confirmed grizzly–polar bear hybrid found in the wild was shot on Banks Island in April 2006, near Sachs Harbour.

== Climate ==
Banks Island has a tundra climate (Köppen ET) typical of the Canadian Arctic with long, cold winters and short, cool summers. Since the activities of many residents of the community revolve around fishing, hunting, and travel, they have considerable knowledge of weather conditions, permafrost, and even erosion patterns.

Climate data for Sachs Harbour (Sachs Harbour (David Nasogaluak Jr. Saaryuaq) Airport} Climate ID: 2503650; coordinates 72°00′N 125°16′W; elevation: 86.3 m (283 ft); 1991–2020 normals, extremes 1955−present (Note: Composite data from Sachs Harbour A; Climate ID: 2503649; coordinates 72°59′37″N 125°14′29″W; elevation: 86.3 m (283 ft) and Sachs Harbour Climate; Climate ID: 2503648; coordinates 72°59′33″N 125°15′15″W; elevation: 87.5 m (287 ft). Sunshine from 1951–1980)
Month	Jan	Feb	Mar	Apr	May	Jun	Jul	Aug	Sep	Oct	Nov	Dec	Year
Record high humidex	15.0	−6.1	−3.2	2.6	9.4	22.1	31.9	26.0	15.9	3.9	1.1	−4.0	31.9
Record high °C (°F)	−4.4 (24.1)	−4.5 (23.9)	−3.2 (26.2)	5.4 (41.7)	10.0 (50.0)	20.5 (68.9)	24.2 (75.6)	23.2 (73.8)	15.6 (60.1)	4.4 (39.9)	1.7 (35.1)	−4.0 (24.8)	24.2 (75.6)
Mean daily maximum °C (°F)	−23.8 (−10.8)	−24.4 (−11.9)	−22.8 (−9.0)	−13.6 (7.5)	−3.6 (25.5)	6.3 (43.3)	9.8 (49.6)	7.2 (45.0)	1.5 (34.7)	−6.5 (20.3)	−15.3 (4.5)	−21.7 (−7.1)	−8.9 (16.0)
Daily mean °C (°F)	−27.4 (−17.3)	−27.8 (−18.0)	−26.4 (−15.5)	−17.2 (1.0)	−6.6 (20.1)	3.4 (38.1)	6.5 (43.7)	4.4 (39.9)	−0.6 (30.9)	−9.3 (15.3)	−18.6 (−1.5)	−25.1 (−13.2)	−12.1 (10.2)
Mean daily minimum °C (°F)	−31.0 (−23.8)	−31.2 (−24.2)	−29.9 (−21.8)	−20.8 (−5.4)	−9.4 (15.1)	0.4 (32.7)	3.3 (37.9)	1.5 (34.7)	−2.8 (27.0)	−12.2 (10.0)	−22.1 (−7.8)	−28.5 (−19.3)	−15.2 (4.6)
Record low °C (°F)	−52.2 (−62.0)	−50.2 (−58.4)	−48.4 (−55.1)	−43.0 (−45.4)	−26.7 (−16.1)	−16.5 (2.3)	−5.0 (23.0)	−11.0 (12.2)	−22.8 (−9.0)	−35.5 (−31.9)	−42.8 (−45.0)	−45.0 (−49.0)	−52.2 (−62.0)
Record low wind chill	−71.6	−68.1	−66.1	−58.4	−40.3	−22.1	−10.3	−16.0	−31.2	−44.9	−55.5	−64.1	−71.6
Average precipitation mm (inches)	5.8 (0.23)	5.3 (0.21)	8.5 (0.33)	9.4 (0.37)	6.7 (0.26)	9.4 (0.37)	14.2 (0.56)	25.5 (1.00)	21.2 (0.83)	17.7 (0.70)	9.5 (0.37)	6.6 (0.26)	139.7 (5.50)
Average rainfall mm (inches)	0.0 (0.0)	0.0 (0.0)	0.0 (0.0)	0.0 (0.0)	0.2 (0.01)	4.5 (0.18)	13.6 (0.54)	—	9.1 (0.36)	—	0.0 (0.0)	0.0 (0.0)	—
Average snowfall cm (inches)	6.0 (2.4)	6.5 (2.6)	—	7.7 (3.0)	—	2.2 (0.9)	0.3 (0.1)	3.1 (1.2)	10.6 (4.2)	—	—	—	—
Average precipitation days (≥ 0.2 mm)	8.9	6.2	8.7	7.5	7.9	5.7	7.7	13.8	13.7	14.3	11.2	7.8	113.2
Average rainy days (≥ 0.2 mm)	0.0	0.0	0.0	0.0	0.4	3.1	6.8	—	5.6	—	0.0	0.0	—
Average snowy days (≥ 0.2 cm)	8.2	6.2	—	6.2	—	1.4	0.4	3.0	7.4	—	—	—	—
Average relative humidity (%) (at 1500 LST)	78.4	77.3	79.1	82.2	83.4	80.6	78.2	84.3	87.2	89.5	85.4	80.7	82.2
Mean monthly sunshine hours	0.1	42.6	165.8	264.8	284.6	330.6	335.7	189.8	79.7	38.7	4.3	0.0	1,736.7
Source: Environment and Climate Change Canada Canadian Climate Normals 1991-2020 (sunshine)

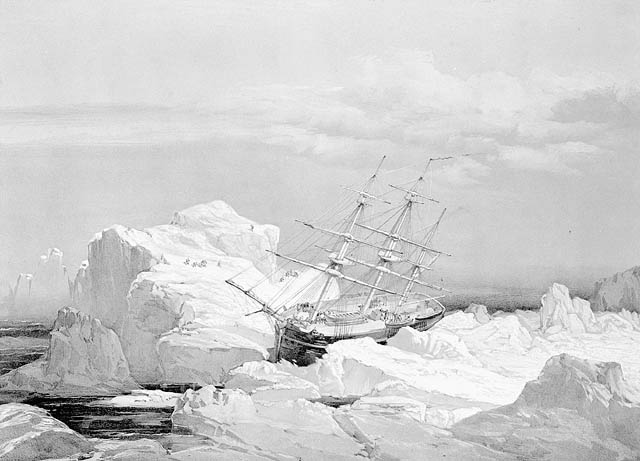
HMS Investigator, Baring Island, August 1851

== HMS Investigator ==
In July 2010, archaeologists with Parks Canada looking for HMS Investigator found it 15 minutes after they started a sonar scan of Banks Island's Mercy Bay. While the archaeology team had no plans to raise the ship, they planned to conduct a thorough sonar scan of the area, then send a remotely operated underwater vehicle.
