= Personnel of Franklin's lost expedition =

The British Naval Northwest Passage Expedition, also known as Franklin's lost expedition, was an attempt by the British Royal Navy to discover and chart the Northwest Passage through the Canadian Arctic in 1845, under the command of Sir John Franklin and using the ships HMS Erebus and HMS Terror. The following is a complete list of the ships' muster rolls.

== HMS Erebus ==
Name	Rank	Origin	Age (as of 1845)
Sir John Franklin	Captain	Lincolnshire	59
James Fitzjames	Commander	London	31
Graham Gore	First Lieutenant (Commander)	Plymouth	35
Henry Thomas Dundas Le Vesconte	Second Lieutenant	Devon	31
James Walter Fairholme	Third Lieutenant	Perth, Scotland	24
James Reid	Ice-Master	Aberdeen	45
Robert Orme Sargent	First Mate		24
Charles Frederick Des Voeux	Second Mate		19
Edward Couch	Third Mate		22
Henry Foster Collins	Second Master	Hastings, Sussex	27
Stephen Samuel Stanley	Chief Surgeon		
Harry Duncan Spens Goodsir	Assistant Surgeon	Anstruther, Fife	25
Charles Hamilton Osmer	Paymaster Purser		46
Thomas Terry	Boatswain	Ramsgate, Kent	34
John Weekes	Carpenter	Portsea, Hampshire	40
John Gregory	Engineer		39
Samuel Brown	Boatswain's Mate	Hull, Yorkshire	34
Thomas Watson	Carpenter's Mate	Yarmouth	40
Philip Reddington	Captain of the Forecastle	Brompton, Kent	28
Daniel Arthur	Quartermaster	Aberdeen	35
William Bell	Quartermaster	Dundee, Forfar	36
John Downing	Quartermaster	Plymouth, Devon	34
John Murray	Sailmaker	Glasgow, Lanarks.	43
James W. Brown	Caulker	Deptford, Kent	28
William Smith	Blacksmith	Thibnam [Tibenham], Norfolk	28
James Hart	Leading Stoker	Hampstead, Middx	33
Richard Wall	Cook	Hull, Yorks.	45
James Rigden	Captain's Coxswain	Upper Deal, Kent	32
John Sullivan	Captain of Maintop	Gillingham, Kent	24
Robert Sinclair	Captain of Foretop	Kirkwall, Orkney	25
Joseph Andrews	Captain of the Hold	Edmonton, Middx.	35
Francis Dunn	Caulker's Mate	Llanelly [Llanelli], S. Wales	25
Edmund Hoar	Captain's Steward	Portsea, Hampshire	23
Richard Aylmore	Gunroom Steward	Southampton, Hants	24
William Fowler	Paymaster and Purser's Steward	Bristol, Somerset	26
John Bridgens	Subordinate Officers' Steward	Woolwich, Kent	26
John Cowie	Stoker	Bermondsey, Surrey	32
Thomas Plater	Stoker	Westminster, Middx.	
Charles Best	Able Seaman	Fareham, Hants.	23
William Clossan *	Able Seaman	Shetland	25
Charles Coombs	Able Seaman	Greenwich, Kent	28
Robert Ferrier	Able Seaman	Perth	29
Josephus Geater ^{†}	Able Seaman	London, Middx.	32
John Hartnell	Able Seaman	Brompton, Kent	25
Thomas Hartnell	Able Seaman	Chatham, Kent	23
Robert Johns	Able Seaman	Penryn, Cornwall	24
Henry Lloyd	Able Seaman	Christiansen, Norway	26
William Mark	Able Seaman	Holyhead, Angelsea [Anglesey]	24
Thomas McConvey	Able Seaman	Liverpool, Lancs.	24
John Morfin	Able Seaman	Gainsboro., Lincolns.	25
William Orren	Able Seaman	Chatham, Kent	34
Francis Pocock	Able Seaman	Upnor, Kent	24
Abraham Seeley	Able Seaman	Gravesend, Kent	34
John Strickland	Able Seaman	Portsmouth, Hants.	24
Thomas Tadman	Able Seaman	Brompton, Kent	28
George Thompson	Able Seaman	Staines, Berks	27
George Williams	Able Seaman	Holyhead, Angelsea [Anglesey]	35
Thomas Work	Able Seaman	Kirkwall, Orkney	41
Daniel Bryant ^{¤}	Sergeant, Royal Marines	Shepton Montague, Somerset	31
Alexander Paterson	Corporal, Royal Marines	Inverness	30
William Braine	Private, Royal Marines	Somerset	32
Joseph Healey	Private, Royal Marines	Manchester, Lancs.	29
Robert Hopcraft	Private, Royal Marines	Nottingham, Notts.	38
William Pilkington	Private, Royal Marines	Kilrush, County Clare	28
William Reed	Private, Royal Marines	Bristol, Somerset	28
George Chambers	Ship's Boy	Woolwich, Kent	18
David Young	Ship's Boy	Sheerness, Kent	18
Thomas Burt ^{‡ ∞}	Armourer	Wickham, Hants	22
Neptune	Pet, Newfoundland dog		
Jacko	Pet, New World monkey		
	Ship's cat		

- ∗ Written with the first "s" as an "ſ" (long s) in Victorian manner i.e.: "Cloẛsan"
- ¤ First name read as "David" in Cyriax crewlist
- † This name appears twice in the original list
- ‡ McClintock spells this as "Birt"
- ∞ Returned to England from the Whalefish Islands on the Barretto Junior

== HMS Terror ==
Name	Rank	Origin	Age (as of 1845)
Francis Rawdon Moira Crozier	Captain	Banbridge, County Down	49
Edward Little	First Lieutenant (Commander)	Hornsey, Middx.	33
George Henry Hodgson	Second Lieutenant	London	28
John Irving	Third Lieutenant	Edinburgh	30
Thomas Blanky	Ice-Master	Whitby, Yorkshire	44
Frederick John Hornby	First Mate		26
Robert Thomas	Second Mate		
Gillies Alexander MacBean	Second Master		29
John Smart Peddie	Chief Surgeon		29
Alexander McDonald	Assistant Surgeon	Laurencekirk, Kincardineshire	27
Edwin James Helpman	Clerk		23
John Lane	Boatswain		
Thomas Honey	Carpenter	Portsmouth, Hampshire	34
James Thompson	Engineer		35
Thomas Johnson	Boatswain's Mate	Corbridge	28
Alexander Wilson	Carpenter's Mate	Lindisfarne	27
Reuben Male	Captain of the Forecastle	Woolwich, Kent	27
David Macdonald	Quartermaster	Peterhead, Scotland	46
John Kenley	Quartermaster	St. Monance [Monans], Fifeshire	44
William Rhodes	Quartermaster	Redingstreet, Kent	31
Thomas Darlington	Caulker	Plymouth, Devon	29
Samuel Honey	Blacksmith	Plymouth, Devon	22
John Torrington	Leading Stoker	Manchester	20
John Diggle	Cook	Westminster, London	36
John Wilson	Captain's Coxwain	Portsea, Hants	33
Thomas R. Farr	Captain of the Maintop	Deptford, Kent	32
Harry Peglar	Captain of the Foretop	London, Middx.	37
William Goddard	Captain of the Hold	Gt. Yarmouth, Norfolk	29
Cornelius Hickey	Caulker's Mate	Limerick, Ireland	24
Thomas Jopson	Captain's Steward	Marylebone, Middx.	27
Thomas Armitage	Gun-room Steward	Chatham, Kent	38
William Gibson	Subordinate Officers' Steward	London, Middx.	22
Edward Genge	Paymaster and Purser's Steward	Gosport, Hants.	21
Luke Smith	Stoker	London, Middx.	27
William Johnson	Stoker	Kirton-Lindsey, Lincolns.	45
John Bailey	Able Seaman	Leyton, Essex	21
John Bates	Able Seaman	London, Middx.	24
Alexander Berry	Able Seaman	S. Ferry, Fifeshire	32
George J. Cann	Able Seaman	Battersea, Middx.	23
Samuel Crispe	Able Seaman	Lynn, Norfolk	24
John Handford	Able Seaman	Sunderland	28
William Jerry	Able Seaman	Pembroke, Wales	29
Charles Johnson	Able Seaman	Halifax, Nova Scotia	28
George Kinnaird	Able Seaman	Hastings, Sussex	23
Edwin Lawrence	Able Seaman	London, Middx.	30
David Leys	Able Seaman	Montrose, Scotland	37
Magnus Manson	Able Seaman	Shetland, Scotland	28
Henry Sait	Able Seaman	Bognor, Sussex	23
William Shanks	Able Seaman	Dundee, Scotland	29
William Sims *	Able Seaman	Gedney, Lincoln.	24
William Sinclair	Able Seaman	Sallaway [Scalloway], Scotland	30
William Strong	Able Seaman	Portsmouth, Hants.	22
James Walker	Able Seaman	S. Shields	29
William Wentzall	Able Seaman	London, Middx.	33
Solomon Tozer	Sergeant, Royal Marines	Axbridge, Somerset	34
William Hedges	Corporal, Royal Marines	Bradford, Wilts	30
James Daly ^{†}	Private, Royal Marines	Luberclue [Tubberclare], County Westmeath	30
John Hammond	Private, Royal Marines	Bradford, Yorks.	32
William Heather	Private, Royal Marines	Battersea, Surrey	35
Henry Wilkes	Private, Royal Marines	Leicester	28
Thomas Evans	Ship's Boy	Deptford, Kent	18
Robert Golding	Ship's Boy	Deptford, Kent	19
William Aitken ^{∞}	Royal Marines	Kenilworth, Surrey	37
John Brown ^{∞}	Able Seaman		
Robert Carr ^{∞}	Armourer	London	23
James Elliot ^{∞}	Sailmaker	Woolwich, Kent	20

- ∗ First name read as "David" in Cyriax crewlist
- † This name is not in the Muster Books but is taken from Cyriax
- ∞ Returned to England from the Whalefish Islands in the Barretto Junior
