= The Terror (novel) =

2007 novel by Dan Simmons

- The Terror first edition cover.
- Author: Dan Simmons
- Language: English
- Genre: Thriller, Historical fiction, Horror
- Publisher: Little, Brown and Company
- Publication date: January 8, 2007
- Publication place: United States
- Media type: Print (Hardback & Paperback)
- Pages: 784 (first edition)
- ISBN: 978-0-316-01744-2
- OCLC: 68416756
- Dewey Decimal: 813/.54 22
- LC Class: PS3569.I47292 T47 2007

The Terror is a 2007 novel by American author Dan Simmons. It is a fictionalized account of Captain Sir John Franklin's lost expedition, on HMS Erebus and HMS Terror, to the Arctic, in 1845–1848, to locate the Northwest Passage. In the novel, while Franklin and his crew are plagued by starvation and illness, and forced to contend with mutiny and cannibalism, they are stalked across the bleak Arctic landscape by a monster.

Most of the characters featured in The Terror are actual members of Franklin's crew, whose unexplained disappearance has warranted a great deal of speculation. The main characters in the novel include Captain Sir John Franklin, commander of the expedition and captain of Erebus; Captain Francis Crozier, captain of Terror; Dr. Harry D. S. Goodsir; and Commander James Fitzjames.

The Terror was nominated for the British Fantasy Award in 2008 and adapted for the first season of an eponymous television series that aired on AMC TV in 2018.

== Plot summary ==
The story begins in medias res in the winter of 1847, when HMS Terror and HMS Erebus have been trapped in ice, 28 miles north-northwest of King William Island, for more than a year. The weather has been much colder than normal, the ships' tinned provisions are dwindling, often putrid, and tainted with lead from soldering. Furthermore, the sea ice and landmasses are mysteriously devoid of any wildlife that can be hunted. In addition to the natural dangers, the crews are being stalked and attacked by a monster resembling an immense polar bear.

In a flashback to 1845, Sir John Franklin is assigned by the British Admiralty to lead an expedition into the Arctic in search of the Northwest Passage. Franklin's second in command, Captain Francis Crozier, joins the expedition as a means of distracting himself after being rejected as a suitor by Franklin's niece. Although the expedition begins auspiciously enough, three men (John Torrington, John Hartnell, and William Braine) die of disease during their first winter in the ice, and soon afterward, Franklin makes the fateful decision to travel around the northwest coast of King William Island, which results in Terror and Erebus becoming trapped.

In the spring of 1847, Franklin sends out parties to search for open water. One of the parties encounters a pair of "Esquimaux": a young woman and an old man. They accidentally shoot the man, whereupon they are set upon by the monster, which kills the expedition's fourth in command, Lieutenant Graham Gore, who led the party. When the survivors return to the ships, the woman follows them. Surgeon Stanley names her "Lady Silence", as her tongue appears to have been bitten off, rendering her mute. After the man dies aboard Erebus, the monster begins stalking the crews. Although the creature shows signs of intelligence, the men initially assume it is merely an unusually big and aggressive polar bear. Franklin is killed in a botched attempt to bait the animal, and a number of other crewmen are killed as the months progress.

Crozier assumes command of the expedition, with Commander James Fitzjames assuming the role of executive officer. Despite some initial tension between them, they gradually become friends as they work to address the conditions facing their men. An ill-fated New Year's Eve carnivale masque ends with a large amount of expedition members, including three of the four surgeons (with only Dr. Goodsir surviving among them) and Lieutenant James Walter Fairholme, being killed by the monster and friendly fire from the expedition's Royal Marines detachment. Crozier subsequently orders Caulker’s Mate Cornelius Hickey (for wearing a white polar bear costume) and two other men (for unbecoming behavior) to be given fifty lashes. Hickey begins to plot against the officers.

As the spring of 1848 approaches, Erebus is eventually crushed and sunk by the relentless ice. Its remaining crew decamps to Terror until Crozier finally orders the ship abandoned. The survivors relocate to "Terror Camp", a tented refuge on King William Island. After ruling out an attempt to reach the far side of the Boothia Peninsula, Crozier and Fitzjames conclude that their best hope is to haul the lifeboats of both ships south to the Back River and row upstream against the current to an outpost on Great Slave Lake, an arduous journey of several hundred miles. Before they can set out, Hickey murders Lieutenant John Irving and lays the blame on a band of Esquimaux whom Irving had in fact befriended; the Esquimaux are attacked and massacred in revenge. From this point on, the crews fear and avoid the native population.

The trek across the island is brutal, and many men die from exhaustion, exposure, and disease – including Fitzjames and Lieutenant Henry Le Vesconte. The monster appears with deadly frequency, at one point slaughtering all of Terror's Royal Marines as well as an entire boat crew as they explore an open lead in the ice, among the dead being Crozier's second, Lieutenant Edward Little, and the sole surviving ice master, James Reid. With no other options, the men continue to press south and eventually reach a position on the southern shore that they name "Rescue Camp". From there, the survivors splinter into several groups due to desperation and the collapsing authority of Crozier, exacerbated by the disproportionate number of deaths incurred among the officers and men loyal to the captain. Hickey and sixteen men declare their intent to return to Terror Camp, while three others opt to return to HMS Terror. Among the mutineers are men whom Crozier thought loyal, shockingly including Lieutenant George Hodgson. Crozier agrees to let them go, but later he and physician Harry Goodsir are lured away from the camp and ambushed by Hickey's men. Crozier is shot and apparently killed by Hickey along with three men loyal to the captain, while Goodsir is taken hostage. The remaining crew, led by Second Mate Charles Des Voeux, an originally junior officer who is now the highest-ranking officer of the expedition to date, believes the captain and Goodsir to be dead and believes a battle with Hickey's faction would be a pyrrhic victory at best. They reluctantly decide to keep marching south with the forty able-bodied loyalists, making the difficult decision to leave all men who are too sick to walk behind to die, including Crozier's faithful steward, Thomas Jopson.

All three groups eventually meet with disaster. Hickey's group, despite resorting to cannibalism, begins to either starve or freeze to death in a blizzard; the remainder are murdered by Hickey, who has begun to suffer delusions of godhood. Goodsir poisons himself, ensuring that any of Hickey's crew who eat his body will die. The monster delivers a death blow to Hickey, but pulls away and does not consume his soul. A later vision relayed to Crozier suggests that the monster will eventually become ill and die after consuming the explorers' souls. The other groups' fates are not revealed, but it is implied that they also perished, rendering Crozier the expedition's sole survivor. Crozier is rescued by Lady Silence, who treats his wounds with native medicine and brings him with her on her travels.

As he recovers from his injuries, Crozier experiences a series of visions that finally reveal the true nature of the creature. It is called the Tuunbaq, a demon created millennia ago by the Esquimaux goddess Sedna to kill her fellow spirits, with whom she had become angry. After a war lasting 10,000 years, the other spirits defeated the Tuunbaq, and it turned back on Sedna, who banished it to the Arctic wastes. There, the Tuunbaq began preying on the Esquimaux until their most powerful shamans discovered a way to communicate with the demon. By sacrificing their tongues to the beast and promising to stay out of its domain, these shamans were able to stop the Tuunbaq's rampage. Lady Silence is revealed to be one of these shamans, and she and Crozier eventually become lovers. He chooses to abandon his old life and join her as a shaman.

Some time later, Crozier and Lady Silence (her real name revealed to be Silna) have two children, and he has taken the name Taliriktug. Traveling with an Esquimaux group, the family discovers many of the expedition's relics (including Des Voeux's silver watch, implying the loyalists' demise) and eventually encounters the still-standing Terror almost two hundred miles south of her original location. After exploring the decaying ship and encountering a shriveled corpse in his former bunk, Taliriktug sets the ship alight and watches the conflagration with his family, as Terror sinks below the ice.

== Characters ==
- Captain Francis Crozier
  - The expedition's second in command (he becomes commander of the expedition following the death of Sir John Franklin) and primary narrator of the novel. He is portrayed as a competent leader and skillful captain, though he suffers from alcoholism and a deep sense of insecurity stemming from his Irish ancestry and humble birth. He also is implied to possess latent psychic abilities. Towards the end of the novel he is shot several times during the betrayal and ambush by Cornelius Hickey, near Rescue Camp. Crozier is saved (in unexplained circumstances) by Lady Silence, who uses native medicine to heal his gunshot wounds. She teaches him how to survive in the adverse Arctic conditions and the ways of the sixam ieua spirit-governors, and the two become lovers. Crozier eventually joins Silence as a sixam ieua, and they have two children together. He adopts the Inuit name Taliriktug, meaning "Strong Arm".
- Commander James Fitzjames
  - The expedition's third in command and the de facto captain of Erebus prior to Franklin's death. He is an upper-class officer, described as handsome and charming. At the start of the novel, Crozier is wary of Fitzjames and jealous of the apparent favouritism that is shown towards him within the Royal Navy. However, they become firm friends as the novel progresses. Following Franklin's death, Fitzjames proves to be a very competent captain of Erebus and an invaluable assistant to Crozier. Throughout the novel, Fitzjames' physical condition steadily deteriorates, and he eventually dies of an illness (implied to be botulism) during the trek south across King William Island.
- Doctor Henry D.S. Goodsir
  - Trained as an anatomist and signed on by Franklin as an assistant surgeon, he is considered the lowest of the four doctors who set out on the expedition, since he is technically an anatomist and not a physician. Following the violent death of the other medical officers at the Venetian Carnivale, Goodsir becomes the only physician aboard either ship. Though he initially appears to be weak and effeminate, he is portrayed as a compassionate, strong-willed, and indefatigable man, who earns the respect of the entire crew. He is also one of the few men Crozier trusts implicitly. During Hickey's final and successful attempt to mutiny and leave the expedition, Goodsir exposes Hickey's real motives to take two sick and catatonic crew members with him. Despite Hickey's insisting the men are his friends, and he and his crew wish to care for them, Goodsir states the real reason Hickey wants the two crewmen is so Hickey's crew can eat them. Goodsir then proceeds to humiliate the flustered Hickey by instructing him in front of the entire expedition on how to butcher his able and healthy friend, Magnus Manson, should he need to later. Goodsir is later kidnapped by Hickey's mutineers, who repeatedly mutilate him when he refuses to assist them in butchering their dead crewmates for sustenance, and Goodsir eventually commits suicide by taking a lethal cocktail of drugs. He does this as a parting shot to Hickey and his men, as the poison he ingests will kill anyone who attempts to eat his corpse.
- Lieutenant John Irving
  - A young officer who is assigned the duty of protecting/investigating the mysterious Inuk woman, "Lady Silence", with whom he has become infatuated. Irving is portrayed as a roguish and carefree womanizer, who has signed onto the expedition for glory and fame. Despite this, he becomes a favourite of Captain Crozier's and is shown to be one of the most reliable officers on the expedition. Late in the novel, whilst on a solo exploration of King William Island, Irving befriends an Esquimaux hunting party. However, before he can return to camp and report his finding of the expedition's potential saviours, he is waylaid and brutally murdered by Cornelius Hickey.
- Caulker's Mate Cornelius Hickey
  - Described as diminutive, devious, and a sea lawyer, Hickey is, after the Tuunbaq, the main antagonist in the novel. Hickey takes a strong dislike to Lt Irving when Irving accidentally discovers Hickey and Seaman Manson having sex in the bowels of HMS Terror and becomes enraged at all the officers when he is flogged in the aftermath of the Venetian Carnivale. His animosity towards Irving culminates with Hickey's horrific murder of the lieutenant on King William Island. Hickey's various attempts at fomenting mutiny are finally successful at Rescue Camp, when he convinces a number of the crewmen to attempt to return to the abandoned Terror Camp. After Crozier grudgingly allows Hickey and his followers to depart from the main expedition, Hickey attempts to return to Terror Camp, although he briefly returns to kill Crozier and kidnap Dr Goodsir. Hickey's crew is eventually killed by the Tuunbaq, which pulls away before consuming his soul, apparently owing to the corruption of Hickey's soul.
- Seaman Magnus Manson
  - A giant, physically powerful man with mild developmental disabilities, Manson is Cornelius Hickey's lover and chief crony. Hickey uses Manson as a sort of living weapon, setting him on people who get in his way. Despite this, Manson is well-regarded by the crew, as his immense strength proves useful for many tasks aboard the ship. Captain Crozier shoots Manson in the stomach during the mutineers' attempt to kill the expedition's commander. Manson survives for several weeks, despite his injuries. Dr Goodsir lies to Manson and Hickey about the severity of the injuries, and ignoring his Hippocratic Oath, allows Manson to die without providing effective treatment.
- Ice Master Thomas Blanky
  - A forthright, jovial and likable man, Blanky is the only character who evades the Tuunbaq, which Blanky accomplishes not once, but twice. In spite of his escape, he loses a leg and suffers other injuries, including frostbite, after which he receives a peg-leg. Despite this, Blanky continues to maintain hope of survival and rescue, until he develops gangrene in the stump of his severed leg during the trek across King William Island. Realizing he is now nothing more than a burden to the crew, he opts to remain behind on the ice whilst the rest of the survivors struggle on, and he is eventually attacked and killed by the Tuunbaq, although it is implied that he dies fighting.
- Captain of the Foretop Harry Peglar
  - A respected member of the crew, Peglar is one of the senior petty officers aboard HMS Terror and is the ex-lover of Subordinate Officers' Steward John Bridgens. Peglar is dyslexic and has a heart complaint that becomes evident later in the novel. He is killed by the Tuunbaq, along with several other members of the crew, while attempting to explore a possible lead to open water.
- Subordinate Officers' Steward John Bridgens
  - The oldest surviving member of the expedition, Bridgens is the ex-lover of Harry Peglar. A learned man, he becomes assistant to Dr Goodsir for a while at 'Rescue Camp'. With starvation and disease the only prospect, Bridgens decides to simply leave the camp and walk into the low hills of King William Island. He is last mentioned in the novel falling peacefully asleep after watching a beautiful Arctic sunset.
- Ship's Boy Robert Golding
  - 23 years old at the close of the novel, Golding is no longer a boy, but he is described as possessing a boy's gullibility. Despite appearing to be loyal to Captain Crozier, he has secretly fallen in with Hickey's band. He conducts an elaborate, and rather humorous, subterfuge to lure Crozier and Dr Goodsir to the Hickey ambush site (his attempts to pronounce the word polynya: polyp and polyanna, exasperate Captain Crozier). Golding eventually dies along with the rest of Hickey's companions.
- Lady Silence (Silna)
  - A young Inuk woman who has a mysterious link to the Tuunbaq. After her companion is shot by a party from the expedition, she accompanies the expedition back to the ships. When her companion dies, she remains aboard Terror, settling into a chain locker in the ship's hold, and comes and goes as she pleases. The crews are afraid of her, believing her to be a witch, and on at least one occasion her life is threatened by Hickey's faction, though Captain Crozier is able to defuse the situation. She apparently follows the men when they leave the ships behind and saves Crozier's life after Hickey shoots him. She teaches Crozier how to survive in the Arctic, and they eventually become lovers. Silence's aptitude for survival is frequently contrasted with the expedition members' failure to keep warm and find sustenance in the harsh Arctic conditions.
- Captain Sir John Franklin
  - Commander of the expedition and the nominal captain of HMS Erebus, he is portrayed in the novel as a pompous snob and buffoon, seeking one last chance at fame and glory after several failed Arctic expeditions and his dismissal from the governorship of Van Diemen's Land. Franklin is killed by the Tuunbaq early in the novel, whilst inspecting the site of an attempt to ambush and kill the monster.
- The Tuunbaq
  - An indestructible killing machine that has taken the form of a massive polar bear with an elongated neck. The product of a war between the Inuit gods, it has been banished to the frozen northern wastes. The Tuunbaq preys on all creatures within its icy domain but particularly likes to eat the souls of humans. Only the sixam ieua - spirit governors of the sky - a select group of Inuit shaman specially bred for their psychic abilities, hold any sway over the beast. The sixam ieua allow the Tuunbaq to eat their tongues as a sign of their dedication, but they can summon the creature and pay homage to it with their throat singing and gifts of animal flesh. They communicate with it (and other sixam ieua) using a form of telepathy.

== Television series adaptation ==
After the success of the show The Walking Dead, the US network AMC produced a horror TV series based on the novel. In March 2016, it was confirmed that AMC had ordered 10 episodes of the show, which premiered on March 26, 2018. David Kajganich and Soo Hugh served as co-showrunners, with Kajganich also penning the adaptation. Ridley Scott, Alexandra Milchan, Scott Lambert, David Zucker, and Guymon Casady served as executive producers.

== Publication information ==
- Simmons, Dan (2007). The Terror (1st ed.). Little, Brown. ISBN 978-0-316-01744-2. 784 pages.
- Simmons, Dan (2018). The Terror (2nd ed.). Bantam Books. ISBN 978-0-857-50391-6. 784 pages.
