= John Irving (Royal Navy officer) =

British Royal Navy officer and explorer

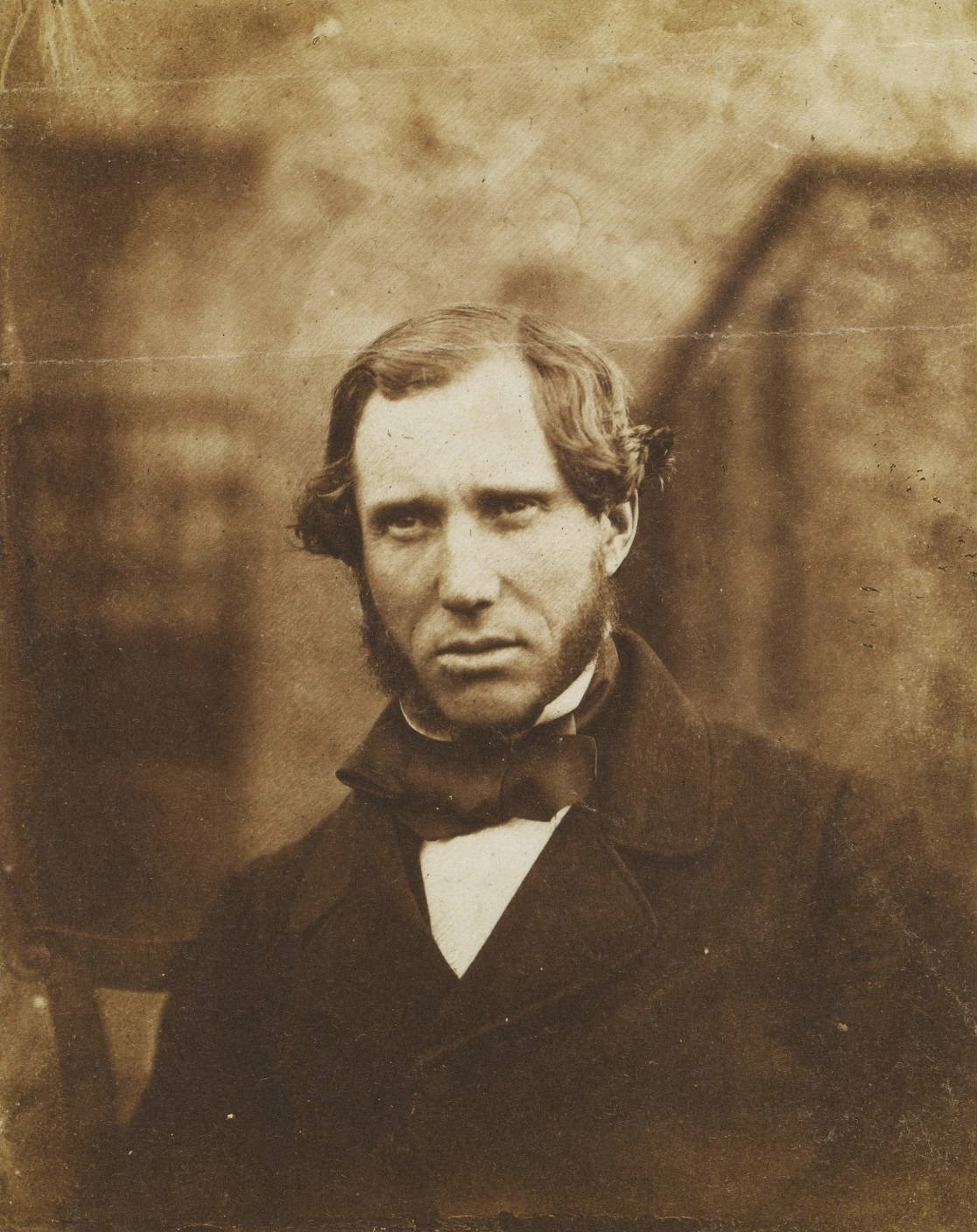
- Irving c. 1845
- Born: February 8, 1815; Edinburgh, Scotland
- Disappeared: April 25, 1848 (aged 33); Victory Point, King William Island, Nunavut, Canada
- Status: Declared dead in absentia 3 March 1854; body allegedly discovered 1879
- Died: King William Island, Nunavut, Canada
- Burial place: Dean Cemetery, Edinburgh, Scotland
- Occupation: Royal Navy officer
- Known for: Franklin's lost expedition

John Irving (8 February 1815 – c. 1848) was a British officer in the Royal Navy and polar explorer. He served under Francis Crozier as Third Lieutenant on the ship HMS Terror during the 1845 Franklin Expedition which sought to discover and chart as-yet unexplored parts of the Canadian Arctic, including the Northwest Passage, and make scientific observations. All personnel of the expedition, including Irving, perished in and around King William Island in what is now Nunavut, Canada. Irving is one of the few men whose remains have been supposedly identified and re-interred in Britain.

== Early life ==
John Irving was born on Princes Street in Edinburgh, Scotland on 8 February 1815, the fourth son of John Irving, a lawyer who was a member of the Society of Writers to the Signet and childhood friend of Sir Walter Scott, and Agnes Hay, daughter of Colonel Lewis Hay, a noted engineering officer who perished in the 1799 Anglo-Russian Invasion of Holland. John Irving attended school in Edinburgh, and then on 25 June 1828 at age 13 entered the navy, attending the Royal Naval College in Portsmouth, England. He was awarded the second prize in mathematics during his time at the college. He first served at sea on the 10-gun brig Cordelia at age 15, but was soon transferred to the frigate Belvidera in the Mediterranean, on which he served for three years. A member of the Church of Scotland, Irving adopted extreme evangelical religious views aboard Belvidera through his friendship with fellow Midshipmen William E. Malcolm and George Kingston.

== Life and career ==
=== Early naval career (1833–1836) ===
After Belvidera was paid off in December 1833, Irving was appointed to the ship HMS Edinburgh at port in Portsmouth. Irving and the fellow evangelicals aboard Edinburgh spent their time studying the Bible, Euclid's geometry texts, and Reverend John Sargent's Memoir of the Rev Henry Martyn, BD. He and his companions were given the mocking name "the Holy Ghost Boys" by non-evangelical sailors.

In May 1835, Irving and the other sailors aboard Edinburgh represented the Royal Navy at the coronation of King Otho of Greece in Athens. Irving was himself in command of a boat that capsized and killed one sailor, but was exonerated of any blame in the incident. The following July, he suffered frostbite while on Mount Etna, which permanently disfigured his face.

=== Living in Australia (1836–1840) ===
In 1836, John Irving left the Royal Navy and with his younger brother David emigrated to Australia aboard the ship Portland with the intention of running a sheep station. They spent four years in Australia, which were characterized by repeated misfortune. Neither brother had experience in agriculture, they were robbed shortly after arrival, the price of sheep fell from 30s. a head to 5s., the farm failed, and John Irving became ill with dysentery and nearly died.

=== Return to the Royal Navy ===
Irving's only course of action following his failures in Australia was to rejoin the Royal Navy, and found passage from Sydney as Acting Mate aboard the navy vessel Favourite. He was back in Scotland by July 1843, and was shortly thereafter promoted to lieutenant. By the end of the year he served aboard the frigate HMS Volage, off the west coast of Ireland, engaged in garrison-supply duties. Following his time aboard Volage, Irving was transferred to HMS Excellent (originally HMS Boyne), an old second-rate gunnery training vessel moored in Portsmouth where young officers routinely spent several months of training. Five Franklin Expedition officers last served on Excellent prior to serving in the expedition: Irving and George Henry Hodgson (Terror), James Walter Fairholme, Robert Sargent, and Charles Frederick Des Voeux (Erebus).

== Franklin Expedition ==
At age 30, John Irving was selected for Arctic Service, due in part to the fact he was unmarried. He was selected by Erebus commander James Fitzjames and appointed Third Lieutenant of Terror on 13 March 1845, the same day as James Walter Fairholme. He was fourth in command of Terror, behind Captain Francis Crozier, First Lieutenant Edward Little, and Second Lieutenant George Henry Hodgson.

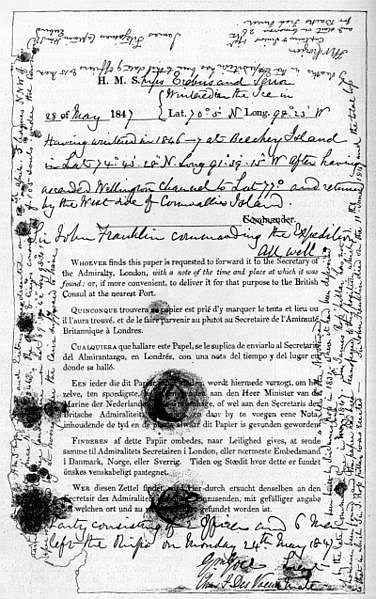
The Victory Point Note, re-found by Irving in 1848 a year after it was deposited by Graham Gore and Charles Des Voeux. It is the last known communication of the Franklin Expeditions. Irving's name is mentioned by James Fitzjames in the margins.

In April 1848, Irving rediscovered a cairn where Lieutenant Graham Gore and Mate Charles Des Voeux had left a written message on command of Franklin and Fitzjames the year prior. Fitzjames added an addendum to the record, now called the Victory Point Note, explaining that several officers and men (including Franklin and Gore) had died and that the ships were being abandoned in an effort by the surviving men to reach mainland Canada. This is the last known official communication of the Franklin Expedition.

=== Alleged grave and re-burial ===
Skeletal remains found by the 1879 expedition of Frederick Schwatka in a shallow grave on Cape Jane Franklin on the west coast of King William Island have been proposed to belong to John Irving. The identification of the remains is based on the fact that Irving's second mathematical medal earned during his time at the Royal Naval College was found alongside the grave. The grave also contained the object-glass of a marine telescope, an officer's gilt buttons, and a coloured silk handkerchief. Schwatka retrieved the skeletal remains and brought them to Scotland. On 7 January 1881, a public funeral was held for Irving and the remains were buried at Dean Cemetery in Edinburgh, Irving's birthplace. David C. Woodman notes that the presence of the medal does not necessarily indicate the grave is Irving's, despite an overwhelming unanimity among writers regarding it as such, and also suggests that if the remains are Irving's their location is indicative of a return detachment to the ships sometime after the initial abandonment and not a straightforward death march, an interpretation also held by Schwatka.

A fiddle-patterned silver table fork belonging to Irving was obtained from the Inuit at Repulse Bay by Scottish explorer John Rae in 1854. The initials of William Wentzell, a London-born Able Seaman aboard Terror, were scratched into the back and front of the fork's handle.

== Legacy ==
An island in the vicinity of King William Island was named "Irving Island" by explorer Francis Leopold McClintock in memory of John Irving.

== See also ==
- List of people who disappeared mysteriously at sea
- Personnel of the Lost Franklin Expedition, for Irving's shipmates
