= George Hodgson (Royal Navy officer) =

English polar explorer (1817–1848)

George Henry Hodgson
- Born: 25 January 1817
- Died: c. 1848
- Occupations: Royal Navy officer, polar explorer
- Known for: First Opium War, Franklin's Lost Expedition
- Awards: Polar Medal

George Henry Hodgson (25 January 1817–c. 1848) was an English Royal Navy officer and polar explorer. He fought in the First Opium War (1839-1842) where he distinguished himself in combat. He later served under Captain Francis Crozier as Second Lieutenant aboard HMS Terror on the 1845 Franklin Expedition, which sought to chart unexplored areas of the Canadian Arctic, find the Northwest Passage, and carry out scientific observations. All personnel of the expedition, including Hodgson, perished in what is now Nunavut, Canada.

== Life and naval career ==
=== Early life ===
George Henry Hodgson was born 25 January 1817 in London, England, to Rector and future Dean of Carlisle Robert Hodgson and his wife Mary Tucker. His older sister was Henrietta Mildred Hodgson, wife of Oswald Smith and great-great-grandmother of Queen Elizabeth II. Through his father, he was cousins to eminent naturalist Brian Houghton Hodgson.

Hodgson joined the Royal Navy on 14 June 1832, in his fifteenth year. He first served off the coast of Lisbon as Midshipman aboard HMS Revenge under Captain Donald Hugh Mackay. In the Summer of 1834, he served in South America aboard North Star under Captain Octavius Vernon Harcourt. In 1836, he served on HMS Dido under Captain Lewis Davies, which was followed by Mediterranean service aboard HMS Pembroke under Captain Fairfax Moresby, lasting until February 1840. In October 1840, he was appointed to the gunnery ship HMS Excellent in Portsmouth under Captain Thomas Hastings.

=== First Opium War ===
Hodgson arrived in China aboard the ship HMS Cornwallis in 1842. He was lightly wounded in a fight with a Chinese soldier during the Battle of the Heights of Segaon. Afterwards, he fought in the Battle of Chapu, the Battle of Wusong, the capture of Shanghai, the Battle of Chinkiang, and the pacification of Nanjing.

On 21 July 1842, Hodgson participated in the Battle of Chinkiang, storming the stronghold city of Zhenjiang near the meeting of the Grand Canal and the Yangtze River. After the taking of the gates of Zhenjiang, the men continued fighting in the streets. The battle was bloody, and the approximately 1500 Manchu bannermen, poorly trained and equipped, provided an unexpected resistance before many fled and killed their families and themselves. In the fighting, thirty-four British were killed and one-hundred-seven were wounded. An additional seventeen British sailors and marines died that day from sunstroke due to the heat. Hodgson, along with Royal Navy officers Granville Loch and future HMS Erebus commander James Fitzjames (who was wounded) distinguished themselves by rushing the Grand Canal to assess its fordability while under fire. For his service in the battle, he received his commission on 23 December 1842, thereby being promoted from mate to lieutenant.

=== Career after China ===
Following his commission, Hodgson was appointed to HMS Wanderer under Captain George Henry Seymour. Aboard Wanderer he participated in a successful battle against Malay pirates. Two other Terror men, Subordinate Officer's Steward William Gibson and Captain of the Foretop Harry Peglar, also served aboard Wanderer during their naval careers. Afterwards, he returned to Excellent. Five Franklin Expedition officers last served on Excellent prior to serving in the expedition: Hodgson and John Irving (Terror), James Walter Fairholme, Robert Sargent, and Charles Des Voeux (Erebus).

=== Franklin Expedition ===
Commander James Fitzjames, a comrade of Hodgson's from their time in China, selected Hodgson to serve on Terror on 4 March 1845, the same day he selected Charles Hamilton Osmer, Edwin Helpman, Henry Thomas Dundas Le Vesconte, Henry Collins, and Charles Des Voeux. On 26 June 1845, while at sea before landing in Greenland, James Fitzjames reported in his letters that Hodgson was ill, but had recovered by the evening. On 10 July 1845, in the Whalefish Islands, Fitzjames reported that he, Fairholme, and Hodgson counted two-hundred-eighty icebergs in the water from atop a nearby hill. The last time the ships and the 129 men aboard them, Hodgson included, were seen by Europeans was as they sailed into the Davis Strait on 28 July 1845. Only scattered bones, artefacts, Inuit testimony, and a few pieces of written material provide information on the fate of the men. All officers and crew of the expedition were officially declared dead in March 1854.

A silver dessert spoon and a silver table spoon belonging to Hodgson were found on King William Island. Both spoons were found by Lieutenant W. R. Hobson of the Francis Leopold McClintock Arctic Expedition in an abandoned boat in Erebus Bay in May 1859, and are engraved with Hodgson's personal crest: a dove holding an olive branch perched on rocks.

== See also ==
- Personnel of Franklin's Lost Expedition, for Hodgson's shipmates
