= Charles Frederick Des Voeux =

British naval officer (1825–1847)

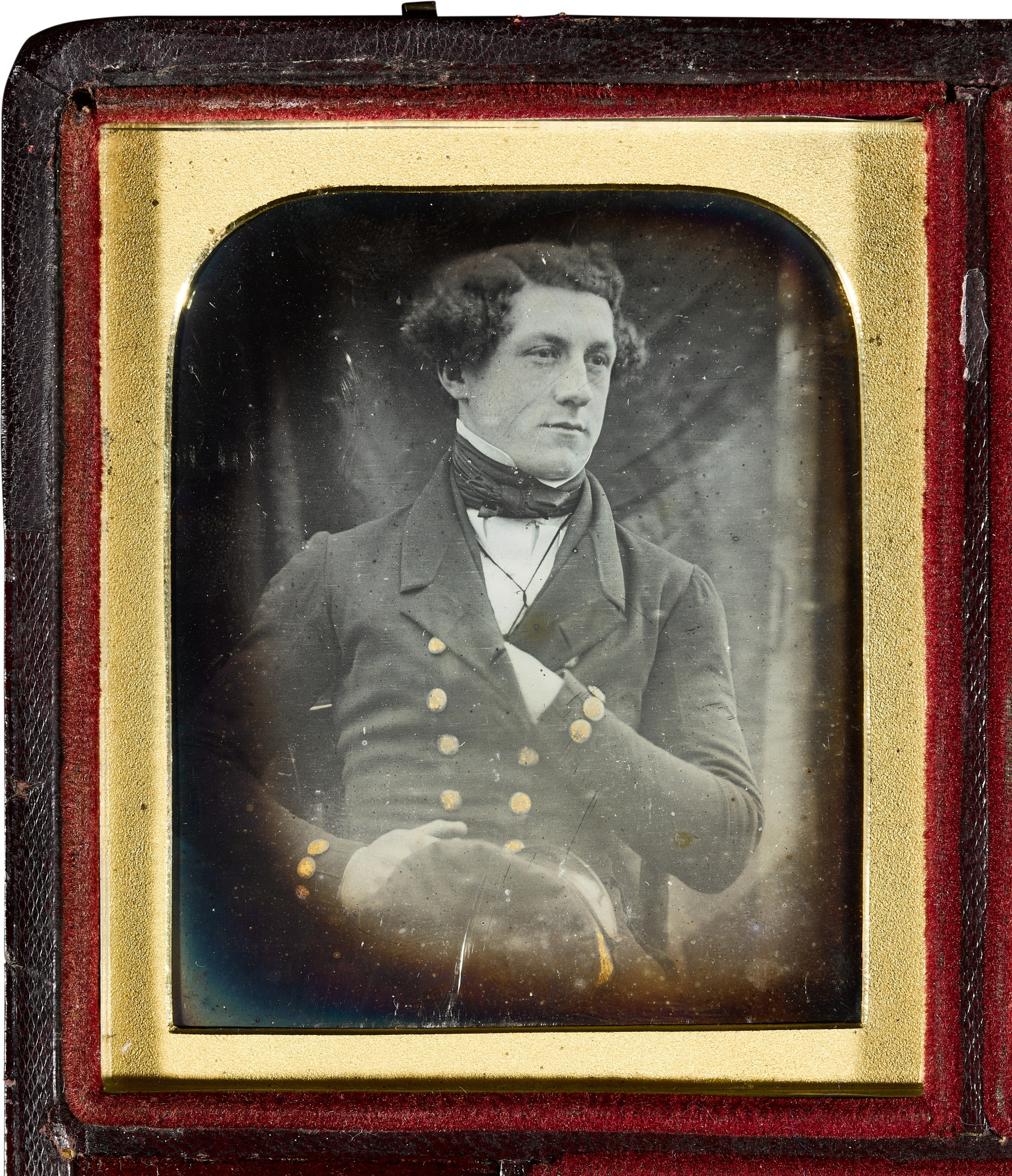
- Occupation: Naval officer
- Rank: lieutenant (1846–)
- Branch: Royal Navy

Charles Frederick Des Voeux (c. 1825—after 28 May 1847) was an Irish officer in the British Royal Navy. He served as mate aboard HMS Erebus during the 1845 Franklin Expedition which sought to chart the Canadian Arctic, including the Northwest Passage, and make scientific observations. All personnel of the expedition, including Des Voeux, died in what is now Nunavut, Canada in uncertain circumstances. He and Graham Gore signed and deposited the Victory Point Record, one of the only official communications of the expedition yet found.

== Life and career ==
=== Family ===
Charles Frederick Des Voeux was the son of Reverend Henry Des Voeux and Frances Dalrymple and a member of the Des Voeux family. He was the brother of cricketer Henry Des Voeux, half-brother of colonial administrator William Des Voeux, and grandson of Sir Charles Des Voeux, 1st Baronet. His great-grandfather Anthony Vinchon de Bacquencourt moved from France to Ireland after renouncing his Catholic faith in favour of Reformed Christianity, also known as Calvinism, and changed the family name to Des Voeux. Charles Frederick Des Voeux was born in Ireland, but the exact location of his birth and where he spent his childhood are unknown.

=== Naval career ===
Des Voeux served under Charles Napier in the Egyptian Ottoman War in 1840. He then proceeded to China for the First Opium War, serving under William Parker and then aboard HMS Endymion under Frederick Grey. Endymion sailed in Hangzhou Bay and the Yangtze River. During the war, he distinguished himself serving as aide-de-camp to Hugh Gough, the commander-in-chief of the British forces. Prior to joining Endymion, he sailed on HMS Cornwallis where he became acquainted with James Fitzjames, who would command Erebus during the Franklin Expedition.

On 1 May 1844, Des Voeux passed his lieutenant's examination, but was not promoted until 9 November 1846 (in absentia). For several months after May 1844, he served as mate aboard the gunnery ship HMS Excellent in Portsmouth, under Thomas Hastings. Five Franklin Expedition officers last served on Excellent prior to serving in the expedition: Des Voeux, James Walter Fairholme, Robert Sargent (HMS Erebus), John Irving, and George Henry Hodgson (HMS Terror).

== Franklin Expedition ==
=== Organization ===
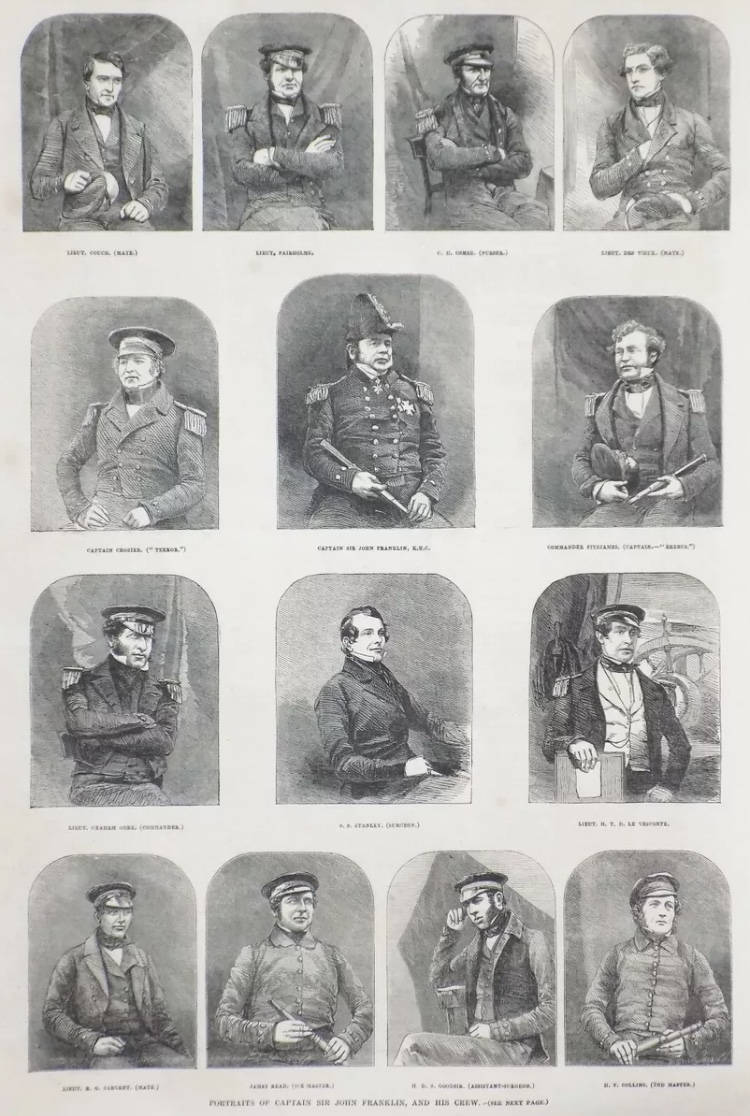
The Illustrated London News (1845). Portraits taken from Richard Beard's daguerreotypes. Des Voeux is at top right

During the preparations for the expedition, James Fitzjames selected Des Voeux as mate due their time together on HMS Cornwallis during the First Opium War. He served aboard HMS Erebus with fellow mates Robert Orme Sargent and Edward Couch. His superior officers were John Franklin, James Fitzjames, Graham Gore, Henry Thomas Dundas Le Vesconte, and James Walter Fairholme. He was one of the officers who posed for a daguerreotype by English photographer Richard Beard before the expedition left. He was described by Fitzjames as "a most unexceptionable, clever, agreeable, light-hearted, obliging young fellow, and a great favourite of Hodgson's, which is much in his favour besides."

=== Victory Point Record ===
The two ships became beset in ice along the northwest coast of King William Island on 12 September 1846. On 24 May 1847, Des Voeux, Graham Gore, and six seamen set out to travel along the west coast of the island in order to ascertain and chart the geographical positions of all the land forms they came across. Gore and Des Voeux deposited and signed a record written by James Fitzjames in a cairn at Victory Point, detailing the efforts of the expedition to that point. In April 1848, Fitzjames and Francis Crozier added an addendum to the record explaining they had deserted the ships and were heading south to Back River on the Canadian mainland. No further written accounts of what happened have been found, and all men perished. The addendum mentions the deaths of Franklin and Gore, but includes no details about Des Voeux.

=== Death ===
None of the remains of Franklin Expedition men found have been identified as Des Voeux's. David C. Woodman has argued there is evidence that the main group knew of a shortcut across what is now called Graham Gore Peninsula, which separates Erebus Bay from Terror Bay and saved time from travelling along the coast, but that the 1847 Gore and Des Voeux sledge party did not, suggesting that a skeleton found there could belong to Des Voeux. All officers and crew of the expedition were officially declared dead in March 1854.

=== Artefacts ===
Inuit from Repulse Bay found various Franklin Expedition artefacts at a camp near the mouth of Back River where many Europeans had starved to death. They traded the artefacts to John Rae in 1854. Among them was a fragment from a plain-woven, cream-coloured woolen shirt with the words "F.D.V. 1845" written in black on the ribbon. Based on the initials on the ribbon, it has been identified as having belonged to Des Voeux.

== See also ==
- Personnel of the Lost Franklin Expedition, for Des Voeux's shipmates
