= Edmund Hoar =

British polar explorer

Edmund Charles Hoar
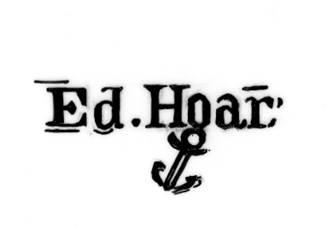
- Born: Feb 1820; Portsea, England
- Died: c. 1848; King William Island, Canada
- Occupations: Captain's Steward, Royal Navy
- Known for: Polar exploration

Edmund Charles Hoar (early 1820 – c. 1848) was a British sailor in the Royal Navy. He served as Captain's Steward to Sir John Franklin aboard HMS Erebus on the fatal 1845 Franklin Expedition to the Northwest Passage. Parks Canada has obtained many of his personal items from the wreck.

== Early life ==
Edmund Hoar was born February 1820 in Portsea, England, the eldest son of John Henry Hoar (1800–1874), a shipwright and Dockyard Guardian at Portsmouth Dockyard, and Susanna Fitzpatrick (1800–1873). He was baptised on 21st October 1821 in the old church of St Mary's, Portsea; like all his family, in the same font as Isambard Kingdom Brunel and Charles Dickens. His younger brother Henry John Hoar (1824–1899) was a gunner in the Royal Navy. He had two younger sisters: Harriet Lucy (b. 1827) and Ann Marie (b. 1830).

== Naval career ==
Hoar first enlisted in the Royal Navy on 20th May 1842 aged 22 as a "domestic" aboard HMS Cornwallis two days after the ship was engaged in the battle of Chapoo (Zhapu) in the First Opium War. This suggests that Hoar was already a merchant navy sailor, possibly with the East India Company. Here he joined Lt James Fitzjames who was already serving in Cornwallis. The war ended with the Treaty of Nanking, signed on board the Cornwallis in 1842. When Hoar returned to England he was rated as able seaman aboard HMS St. Vincent, which at the time was a depot vessel in Portsmouth Harbour. He is recorded in the muster book of the Cornwallis as: 5ft 11 1/2" tall with blue eyes, light hair, fair complexion, an anchor tattoo on his right arm and vaccinated (against smallpox). He was unmarried.

=== The Franklin Expedition ===
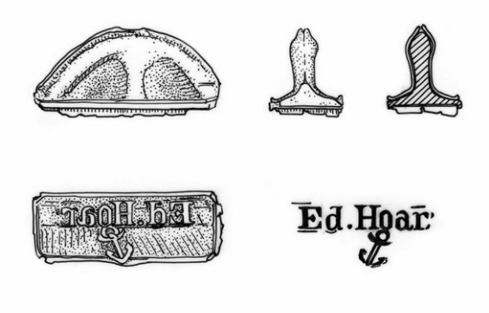
Pewter name stamp. Credit: Carol Pillar, Parks Canada Agency

In 1845 James Fitzjames was given command of HMS Erebus and tasked with recruiting most of the crew for both the Erebus and HMS Terror. He included a number of former shipmates from the Cornwallis, including Hoar, who was appointed Captain's Steward to Sir John Franklin on the Erebus. During the preparations for the voyage Hoar worked with Franklin's household and became acquainted with Jane Franklin's lady's maid Mary Foster. In Franklin's last letter to his wife he enclosed a letter from Hoar to Foster and wrote in a footnote to Lady Jane that Hoar had expressed the hope that Foster would remain with her until their return from the Arctic.

On 19th May 1845 the expedition left Greenhithe to seek a passage through the frozen archipelagos of northern Canada through to the Pacific. In April 1848, the crews of the two ships — which were beset by ice off King William Island — deserted the ships and set out across the ice dragging the ship's boats but they all perished in the attempt. Human remains and artefacts from the expedition have been found strewn along the south west coast of the island. DNA testing of the recovered bones has been undertaken where possible but thus far no match to Hoar has been found.

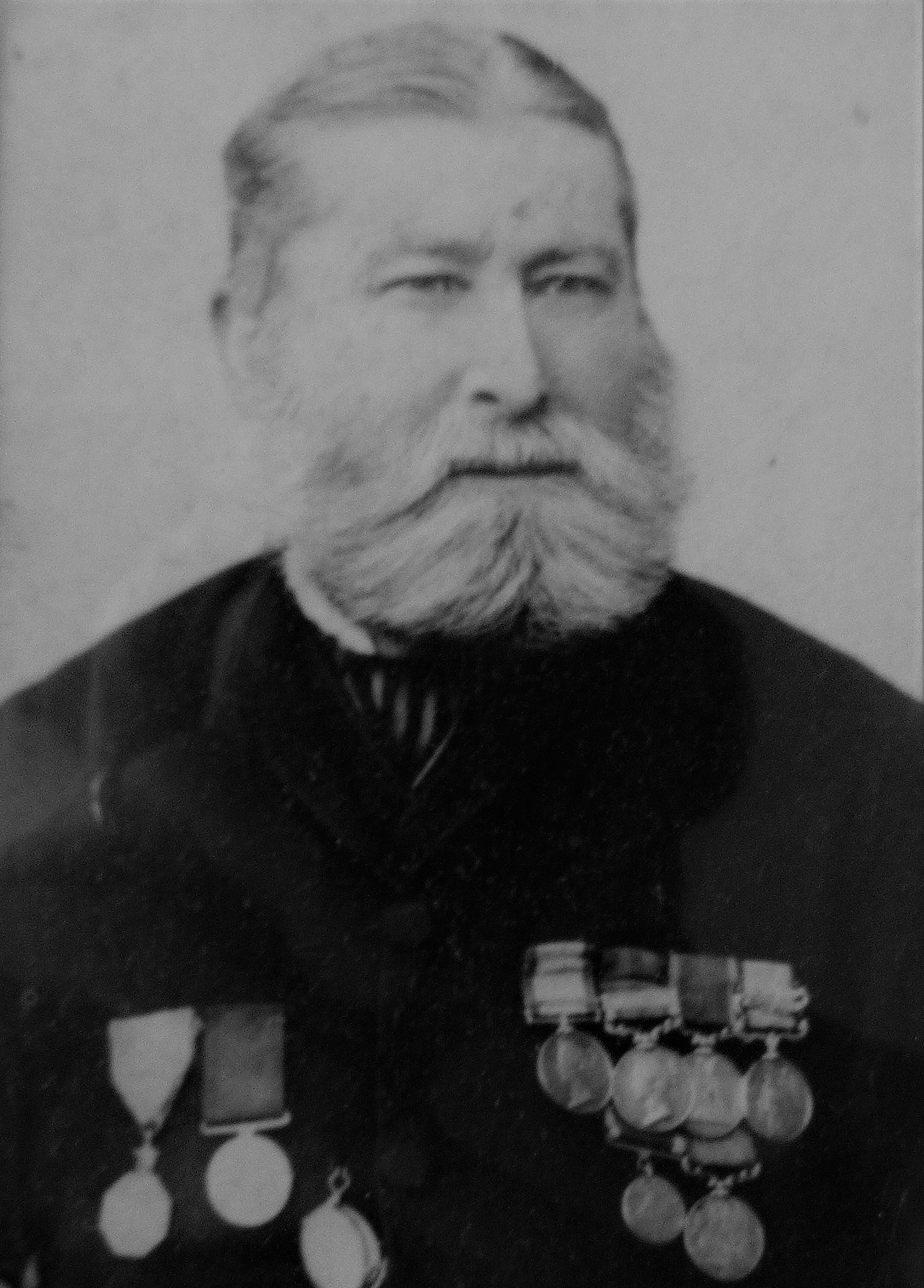
A photograph of Henry Hoar taken in the 1880s. On his right breast are his brother Edmund's Polar Medal (octagonal) and China Campaign medal.

The crews were all posthumously awarded the Polar Medal. Edmund Hoar's medal was presented to his father, John Hoar, on 8 October 1860, and worn by his brother Henry Hoar. No photograph of Edmund Hoar is thought to exist and none of his letters have survived.

=== Finding the wreck ===
In 2014 a Parks Canada research vessel located the intact and well preserved wreck of the Erebus in shallow water near O'Reilly Island, south of King William Island. After two seasons of archaeological dives to study the upper deck of the vessel they broke through to the main deck below, and the first cabin they chanced upon was the pantry of the Captain's Steward. Subsequent dives have recovered numerous artefacts from the pantry, some being items relating to his role on the ship such as a full dinner set of 48 blue and white Whampoa china used by the officers. Many of the finds are personal items such as a pewter stamp inscribed "Ed.Hoar" and a bundle of coins with holes through the middle, originally tied together, consisting of a 1797 George III cartwheel penny and several Chinese coins current in Nanking at the time. A hair brush with human hair was found in his cabin but the hair was too degraded to extract DNA to match to Hoar (or indeed Franklin). Also found in the cabin but not necessarily related to Hoar were a Latin primer, pens and pencils, sealing wax (with a finger print in it), an accordion, a sealed medicine bottle marked "C" and Arabica coffee beans. In 2022 a large intact book cover/portfolio with a quill pen tucked inside was also recovered. It has been undergoing conservation since 2022.

HMS Terror was found by Parks Canada's partners in 2016 in an even better state of preservation.

== See also ==
- Personnel of Franklin's lost expedition

== Bibliography ==
- Muster book HMS Cornwallis 1841
- Muster book HMS Erebus 1845
- Baptismal and Marriage Registers, St Mary's Church, Portsea
- Parks Canada Agency
