= Thomas Blanky =

English sailor (1804 – 1848/51?)

- Born: 1804; Whitby, Yorkshire, England
- Disappeared: 1848/51? Canadian Arctic
- Died: 1848/51?
- Other names: Thomas Blenky, Thomas Blenkey
- Occupations: Sailor, ice master
- Known for: Ice master on HMS Terror during the 1845 Franklin expedition
- Height: 170 cm (5 ft 7 in)
- Spouse: Esther Wilson (married 1834)
- Children: 1

Thomas Blanky (also spelled Blenky or Blenkey, c. 1804 – 1848/51?) was an English sailor and Arctic ice master who served aboard HMS Terror during the 1845 Franklin expedition. He had previously taken part in several Arctic expeditions, and joined the Franklin expedition to assist with navigation through Arctic pack ice. He disappeared with the expedition after the ships became trapped in the Canadian Arctic and is believed to have died during the expedition.

== Early life ==
Blanky was probably born in Whitby, Yorkshire on 24 January 1804, the son of William and Margaret (or possibly Mary) Blenkey, and was baptised there the following day. His father was a labourer. He had at least seven siblings, several of whom died in childhood.

== Career ==
Blanky spent much of his life working in the merchant navy. He first went to sea at the age of eleven, serving as an apprentice on a collier for six years. He worked various roles in the merchant navy, including two years in the Greenland fishery. As a merchant seaman he had made voyages to Alexandria, Riga, Quebec and St. Petersburg.

In 1824 he served as an able seaman on HMS Griper during an expedition to Cumberland Strait commanded by George Francis Lyon. He later joined William Edward Parry's 1827 expedition that attempted to reach the North Pole on HMS Hecla. Between 1829 and 1833 he served as mate aboard the vessel Victory during John Ross's Arctic expedition. He was described in expedition records as about 5 feet 7 inches (170 cm), strongly built, with light hair and a fair complexion. After Victory was abandoned in 1832, Ross's party retreated with sledges and boats towards Fury Beach. During the retreat Blanky acted as spokesman for the fatigued crew and proposed abandoning the boats and spare provisions. Ross reprimanded him for behaviour he described as approaching mutiny, but later gave him a strong recommendation. Making use of a well-preserved food cache left on Fury Beach by Parry two decades earlier, the crew were rescued by the Hull whaling ship Isabella and escaped the Arctic. Only three men had died and the crew were welcomed home, with Ross receiving a hero's welcome and being knighted.

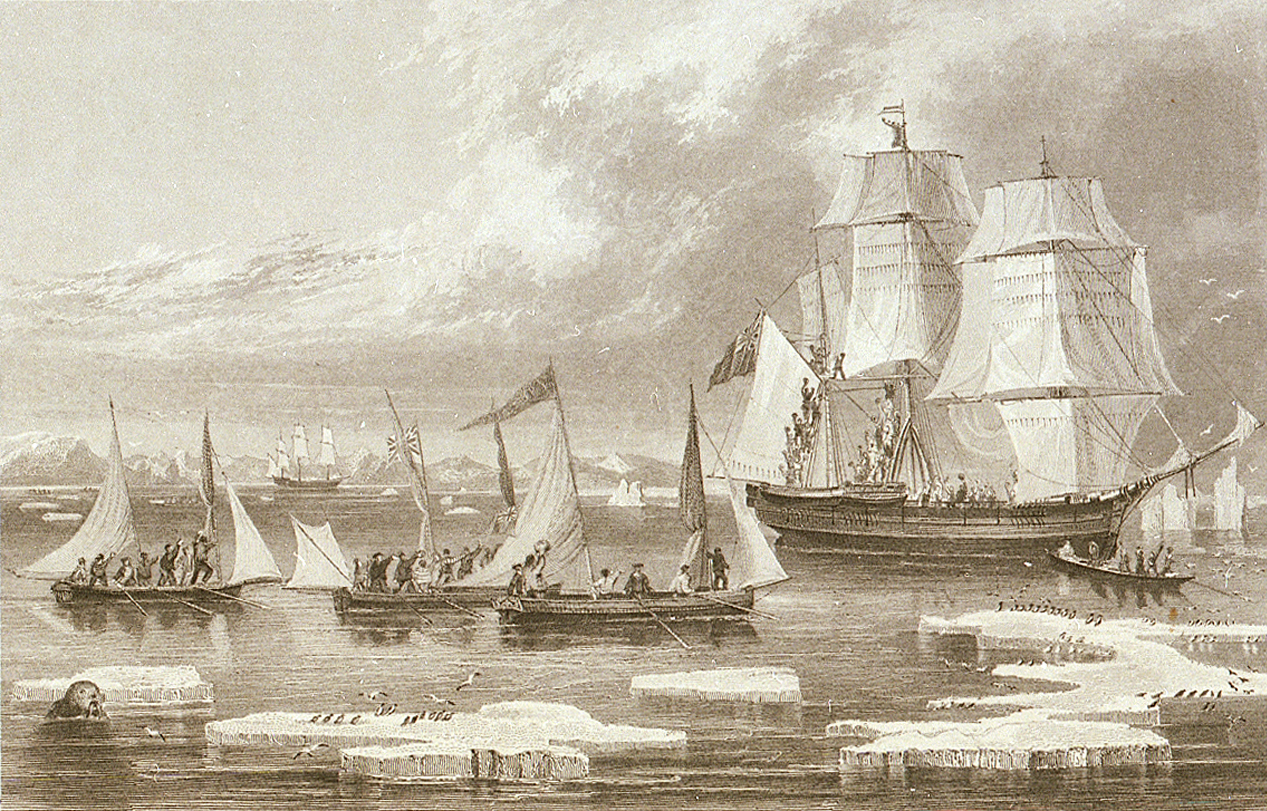
Isabella saves the crew of Victory, 1834 engraving

Blanky was later recorded as a master mariner in Whitby before moving to Liverpool.

=== Franklin expedition ===
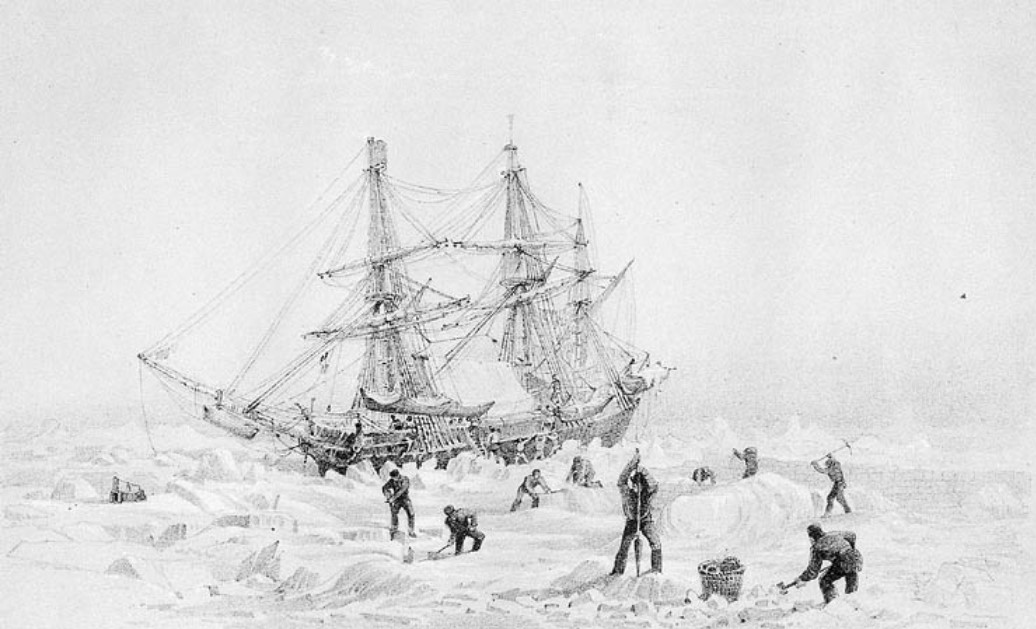
HMS Terror in the Arctic

Blanky joined the Franklin expedition, led by Sir John Franklin, as ice master of HMS Terror and boarded the ship on 28 April 1845, shortly before the expedition sailed. His late appointment was likely the result of recommendations from experienced Arctic officers. One officer on the expedition described him in a letter as "a clever, capital chap & much liked". Blanky was the second most experienced Arctic sailor on either ship, surpassed only by Franklin himself. The expedition became trapped in Arctic ice, and Blanky disappeared along with the rest of the crew. No personal relics associated with Blanky were recovered during later searches for the expedition. It is possible that Blanky was among the officers already dead by April 1848, although his exact death date is unknown.

== Personal life ==
In 1834, Blanky married Esther Wilson in Whitby and they had a daughter together later that year.

== Legacy ==
A small uninhabited island in the Arctic, Blenky Island, was named after him on the 1829 Ross expedition.

Blanky was portrayed by Ian Hart in AMC's 2018 television series dramatising the Franklin expedition, The Terror.
