= Graham Gore =

British naval officer and polar explorer

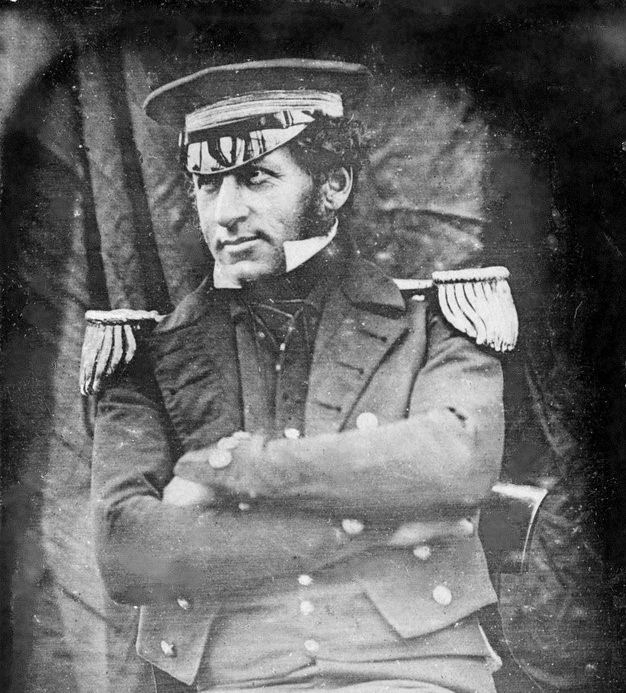
Lieutenant Graham Gore in 1845

Graham Gore (c. 1809 – between 28 May 1847 and 25 April 1848) was an English officer of the Royal Navy and polar explorer who participated in two expeditions to the Arctic and a survey of the coastline of Australia aboard HMS Beagle. In 1845 he served under Sir John Franklin as First Lieutenant (the third most senior rank) on the Erebus during the Franklin expedition to discover the Northwest Passage, which ended with the loss of all 129 officers and crew.

== Early life ==
Graham Gore was born in Plymouth in Devon in about 1809, the second eldest of six children of Sarah Gilmour (1777–1857) and John Gore (1774–1853). His was a family of distinguished naval officers, particularly in the field of exploration. His father was a Royal Navy Officer who reached the rank of captain on 19 July 1821, retiring in that rank on 1 October 1846, later promoted to Retired Rear Admiral on 8 March 1852. He moved to Australia with his family in 1834 as one of the first free settlers; by that time, Graham Gore was already at sea in the naval service. Graham Gore's paternal grandfather was the British-American naval officer Captain John Gore who circumnavigated the globe four times with the Royal Navy in the 18th century and accompanied Captain James Cook in his discoveries in the Pacific Ocean.

Gore's family moved to Barnstaple in Devon from where his father, anxious for his son to serve in the Royal Navy, wrote a letter to the Admiralty "to enter my son Graham Gore, age 11 years, educated by myself and Mr. Bridge, Schoolmaster of Barnstaple." While there were concerns that the boy was too young permission was granted for him to join his father and older brother John Gore (1807–1830) as a volunteer on board Dotterel. Graham Gore joined the ship on 27 April 1820 with the rank of Midshipman, serving on board for a year with his father, brother and Francis Crozier until Crozier was appointed to HMS Fury. The three Gores remained aboard the ship until she paid off on 20 July 1821 when it would appear that Graham Gore returned to the family home for the following year where he presumably continued his education under the guidance of his father.

Graham Gore was an accomplished artist and a keen shot and huntsman, both skills he was to put to good use during his naval career.

== Naval career ==
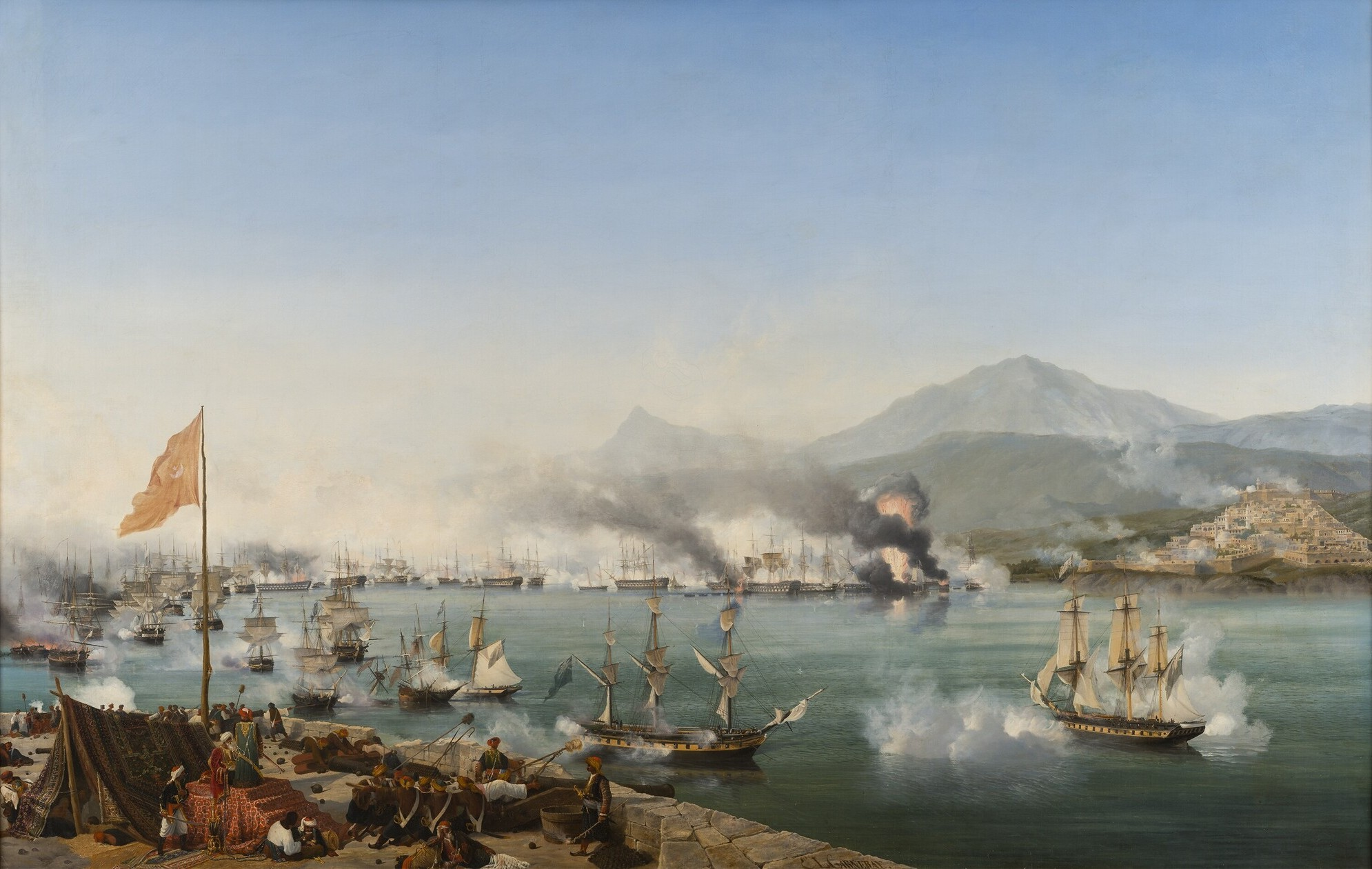
Gore took part in the Battle of Navarino in 1827 – painting by Ambroise Louis Garneray

In 1822 with his older brother he entered the Royal Naval College in Portsmouth. He after served on HMS Albion under Captain John Acworth Ommanney. Gore saw action in October 1827 on board Albion when she was part of a combined British-French-Russian fleet under the command of Admiral Edward Codrington at the Battle of Navarino, where a Turkish-Egyptian fleet was obliterated, securing Greek independence. This was to prove to be the last ever sea battle between Nelson-era wooden sailing ships.

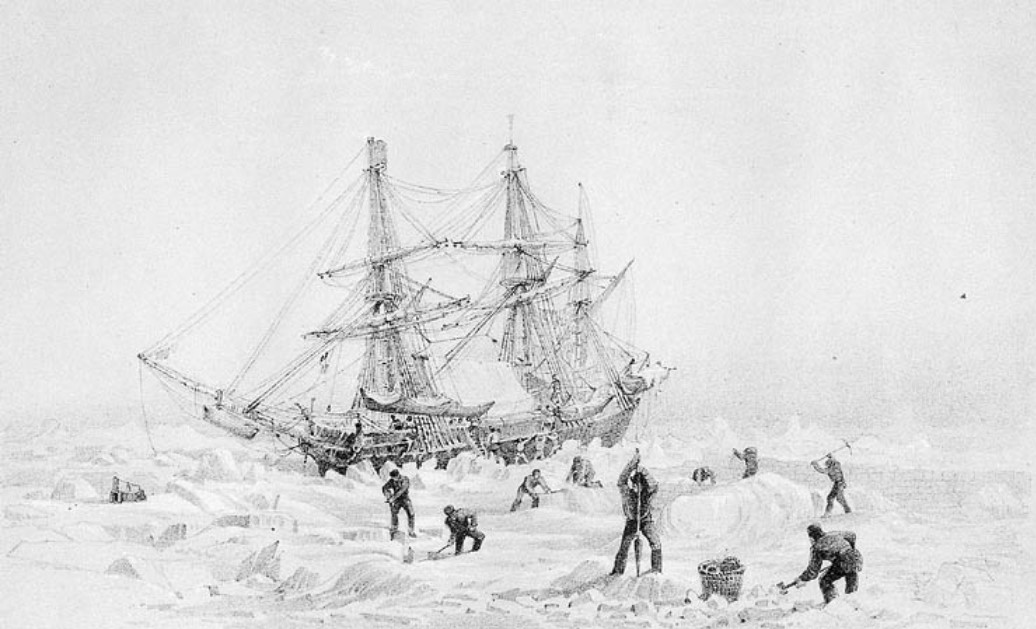
HMS Terror thrown up by ice near Southampton Island (1836)

Having passed his examination in 1829, during 1836 to 1837 Gore served as Mate on HMS Terror under the command of Captain Sir George Back during the exploration of the Arctic at Hudson Bay for which he received his first award of the Arctic Medal. The expedition aimed to enter Repulse Bay where it would send out landing parties to ascertain whether the Boothia Peninsula was an island or a peninsula. Terror was trapped by ice near Southampton Island, and did not reach Repulse Bay. At one point, the ice forced her 12 m (39 ft) up the face of a cliff. She was trapped in the ice for ten months. Captain Back's diary says that Christmas Day dinner 1836 was a "haunch of reindeer shot by Mr Gore". Gore gained his first commission in January 1837, when he was appointed Lieutenant. In the spring of 1837 an encounter with an iceberg further damaged the ship. She nearly sank on her return journey across the Atlantic, and was in a sinking condition by the time Back was able to beach the ship on the coast of Ireland on 21 September. Such was the damage that the Terror had to be kept intact by passing chains around the hull.

Lieutenant Gore served on the Modeste in November 1837 and the Volage in January 1838, on the latter ship seeing action during the Aden Expedition in 1839; he was in action against the Bogue Forts and the Capture of Chusan in 1840 during the First Opium War.

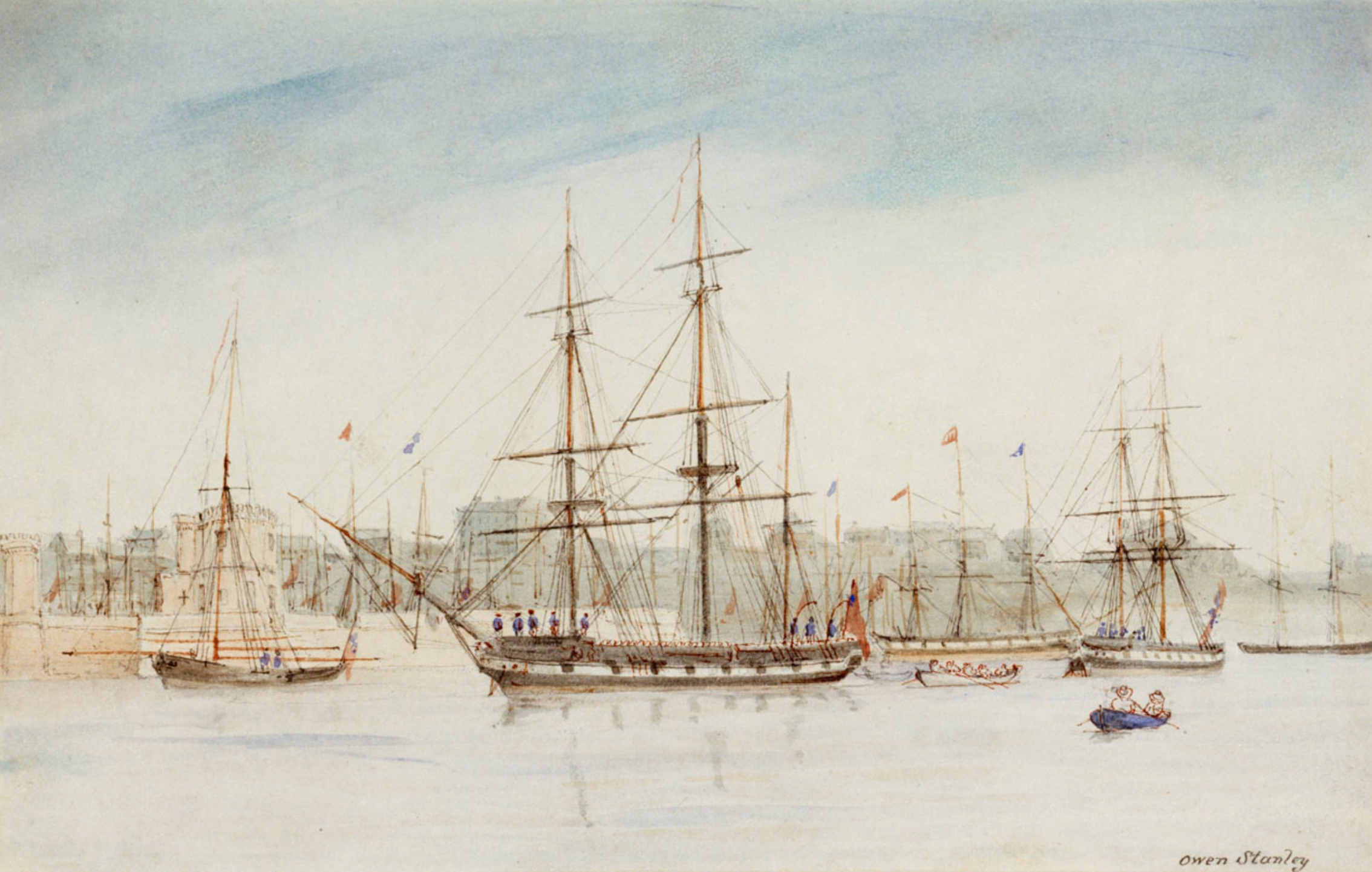
In 1840 Gore joined HMS Beagle during its survey of Australia – shown here in an 1841 watercolour by Captain Owen Stanley of Beagle's sister ship HMS Britomart.

In October 1840, Gore was ordered to HMS Herald at the East India Station. Travelling to Sydney in Australia to join his ship Gore could not find the Herald so instead joined the crew of HMS Beagle, then under the command of Captain John Lort Stokes. This was the same Beagle on which Charles Darwin had made his famous researches. While in Australia Gore had the opportunity to visit his parents, sisters and brother at Lake Bathurst. During its expedition with Gore among the crew the Beagle surveyed large sections of the coast of Australia.

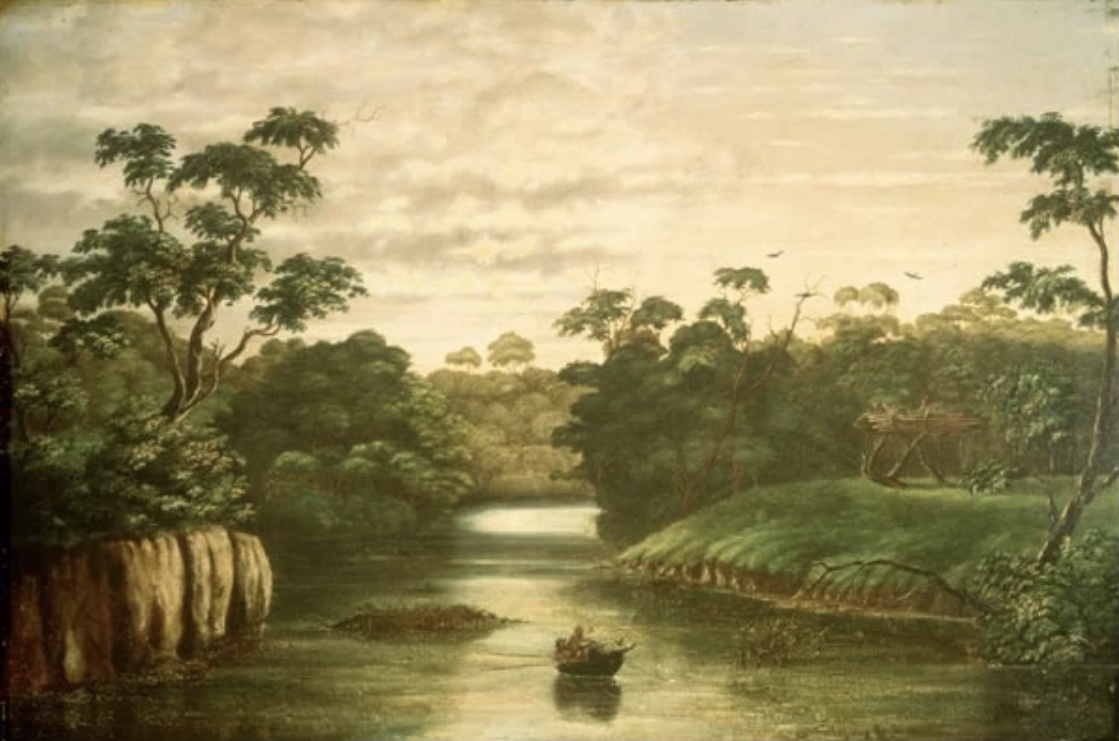
Gore's painting of Burial Reach and Flinders River in Queensland (1841) – collection of the National Library of Australia

Gore was an accomplished artist; his painting of Burial Reach and Flinders River made during the voyage is held by the National Library of Australia. Later during the expedition Gore was injured when the gun he was using to shoot cockatoos from a gig to augment the crew's diet exploded in his hands. Captain Stokes reported that Gore, "my much-valued friend...nearly blew off his own hand whilst shooting" and ended up "stretched at his length at the bottom of the boat". Stunned but fortunately with only a minor injury to his hand, Gore could only quietly remark, "Killed the bird..." This comment Stokes described as "an expression truly characteristic of a sportsman". Stokes clearly liked Gore, later writing in his memoirs, "There was only one drawback to the pleasure I experienced on arriving in England, -- namely, that Lieut. G. Gore did not obtain his promotion, but was compelled to seek it by a second voyage to the North Pole."

In December 1843, Gore was transferred to the steam frigate HMS Cyclops on which he was "employed for particular service".

== Franklin expedition ==
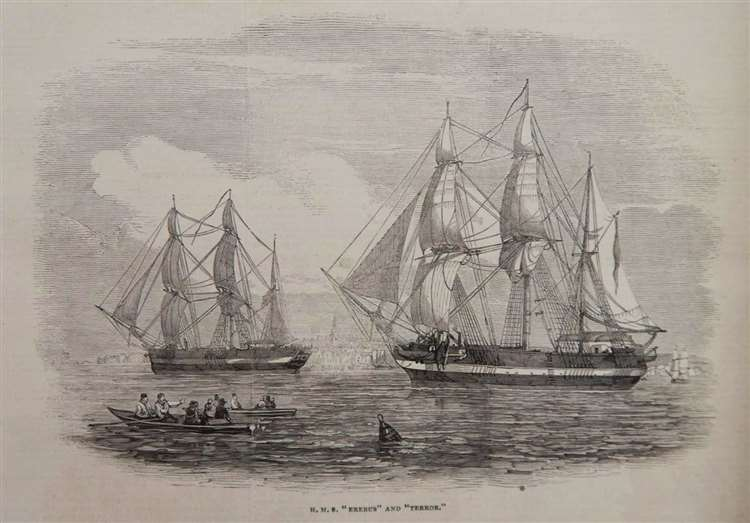
HMS Erebus and HMS Terror in 1845

On 8 March 1845, Gore joined the crew of the discovery ship Erebus on its Northwest Passage explorative expedition. He was the third most senior officer on board after Captain Sir John Franklin and Commander James Fitzjames. The latter described Gore as a "man of great stability of character, a very good officer, and the sweetest of tempers." He was among twelve officers of the Franklin Expedition who posed for a daguerreotype by photographer Richard Beard at the docks before sailing. The expedition set sail from Greenhithe, Kent, on the morning of 19 May 1845, with a crew of 24 officers and 110 men. The ships stopped briefly in Stromness, Orkney Islands, in northern Scotland. From there they sailed to Greenland with HMS Rattler and a transport ship, Baretto Junior; the passage to Greenland took 30 days.

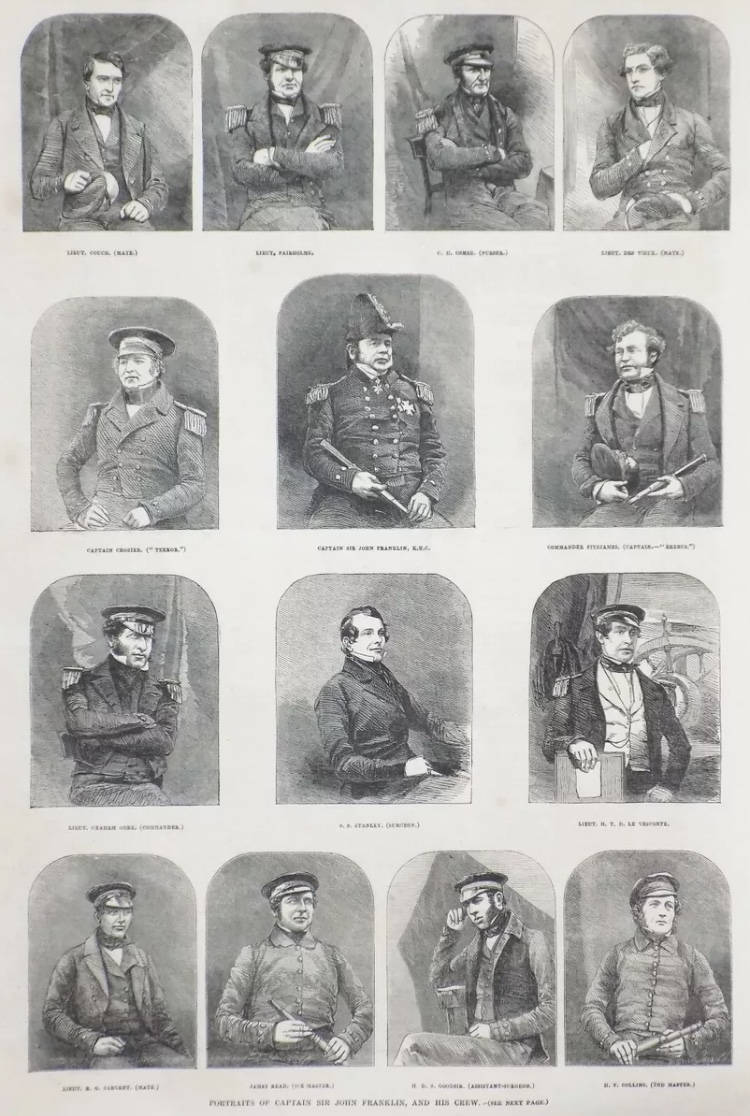
Sir John Franklin and some of his crew – Gore (third row, left) – The Illustrated London News (1845)

At the Whalefish Islands in Disko Bay, on the west coast of Greenland, 10 oxen carried on Baretto Junior were slaughtered for fresh meat which was transferred to Erebus and Terror. Crew members then wrote their last letters home, which recorded that Franklin had banned swearing and drunkenness. Gore sent Lady Jane Franklin a watercolour and pen sketch of the Erebus being towed into Disko Bay by the tug Blazer on 31 May 1845. Five men were discharged due to sickness and sent home on Rattler and Barretto Junior, reducing the final crew to 129 men. In late July 1845 the whalers Prince of Wales (Captain Dannett) and Enterprise (Captain Robert Martin) encountered Terror and Erebus in Baffin Bay, where they were waiting for good conditions to cross to Lancaster Sound. The expedition was never seen again by Europeans.

Only limited information is available for subsequent events, pieced together over the next 150 years by other expeditions, explorers, scientists and interviews with Inuit. Franklin's men spent the winter of 1845–46 on Beechey Island, where three crew members died and were buried. After travelling down Peel Sound through the summer of 1846, Terror and Erebus became trapped in ice off King William Island in September 1846 and are thought never to have sailed again. Gore was promoted to commander on 9 November 1846.

In May 1847, Franklin sent Lieutenant Gore, First Mate Charles Frederick Des Voeux and six sailors on a landing party to explore the west side of King William Island. They were instructed to leave prewritten notes in cairns and then return to the ships after they had completed their exploration. The party of eight men left the ships on 24 May and after trekking for four days reached their first objective, Sir James Ross' Cairn at Victory Point. Here they left their first note (the Victory Point Note) before continuing south. This note provides the only first-hand information on the expedition's progress. The next day the men reached their second objective at Gore Point, but as there was no cairn at this location they built one and left another note inside before exploring further south following which they returned to the ships. These two notes would be found in their cairns in 1859 by William Hobson.

The Victory Point Note left by Gore was retrieved from its cairn on 25 April 1848 and a second part added before being signed by Fitzjames and Crozier. This later addition informs us that the crew had wintered off King William Island in 1846–47 and 1847–48, and Franklin had died on 11 June 1847. Gore and 7 other officers and 15 men had also died before the remaining crew had abandoned their ships and planned to walk over the island and across the sea ice towards the Back River on the Canadian mainland, beginning on 26 April 1848. The Victory Point Note is the last known communication of the expedition.

From archeological finds, it is believed that all of the remaining crew died on the subsequent 400 km long march to Back River, most on the island. Thirty or forty men reached the northern coast of the mainland before dying, still hundreds of miles from the nearest outpost of Western civilization.

Before the official proclamation of the deaths of Franklin's men in 1854, Gore was promoted to captain in absentia by the Admiralty.

=== The Victory Point Note ===
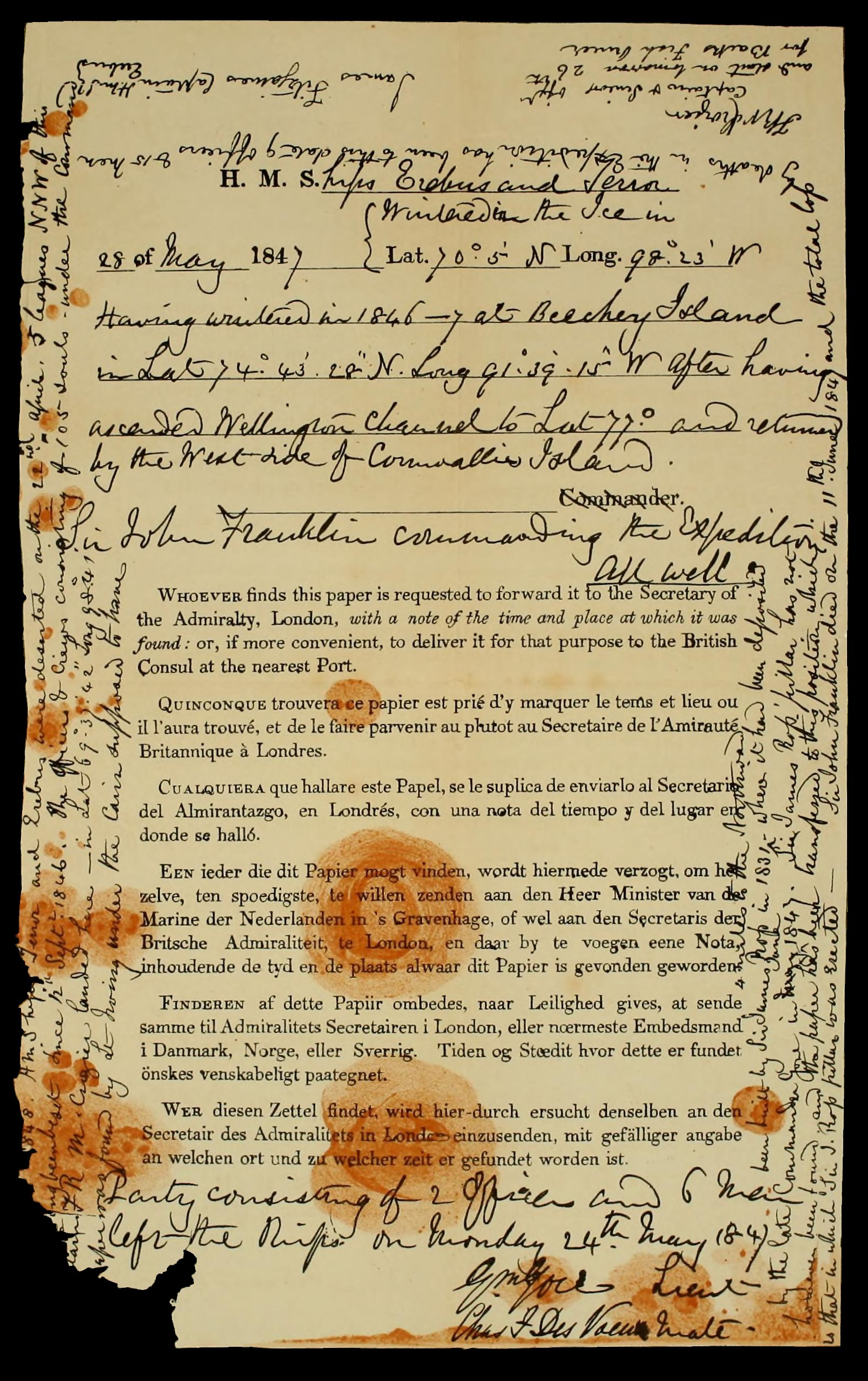
The "Victory Point" note – signed by Gore in May 1847

The Victory Point Note was found 11 years later in May 1859 by William Hobson (Lieutenant on the McClintock Arctic expedition) placed in a cairn on the northwestern coast of King William Island. It contains the only surviving information we have concerning the fate of Gore and the rest of the crew and consists of two parts written on a pre-printed Admiralty form. The first part was written after the first overwintering in 1847, while the second part was added one year later. From the second part it can be inferred that the document was first deposited in a different cairn previously erected by James Clark Ross in 1830 during John Ross' Second Arctic Expedition – at a location Ross named Victory Point. The document is therefore referred to as the Victory Point Note.

The first message is written within the body of the form and dates from 28 May 1847.

H.M.S ships 'Erebus' and 'Terror' wintered in the Ice in lat. 70 05' N., long. 98 23' W. Having wintered in 1846–7 at Beechey Island, in lat. 74 43' 28" N., long. 91 39' 15" W., after having ascended Wellington Channel to lat. 77°, and returned by the west side of Cornwallis Island. Sir John Franklin commanding the expedition. All well.

Party consisting of 2 officers and 6 men left the ships on Monday 24th May, 1847.

(Signed) GM. GORE, Lieut.

(Signed) CHAS. F. DES VOEUX, Mate.

The second and final part is written largely on the margins of the form due to lack of remaining space on the document. It was presumably added on 25 April 1848 when the note in its protective metal cylinder was retrieved from its cairn before being replaced.

[25th April 1]848 H.M. ships 'Terror' and 'Erebus' were deserted on the 22nd April, 5 leagues N.N.W. of this, [hav]ing been beset since 12th September, 1846. The officers and crews, consisting of 105 souls, under the command [of Cap]tain F.R.M. Crozier, landed here in lat. 69˚ 37' 42" N., long. 98˚ 41' W. [This paper was found by Lt. Irving under the cairn supposed to have been built by Sir James Ross in 1831–4 miles to the Northward – where it had been deposited by the late Commander Gore in ~~May~~ June 1847. Sir James Ross’ pillar has not however been found and the paper has been transferred to this position which is that in which Sir J. Ross’ pillar was erected – Sir John Franklin died on the 11th June, 1847; and the total loss

by deaths in the expedition has been to this date 9 officers and 15 men. (Signed) JAMES FITZJAMES, Captain H.M.S. Erebus.

(Signed) F.R.M. CROZIER, Captain & Senior Offr.

and start on tomorrow, 26th, for Back's Fish River.

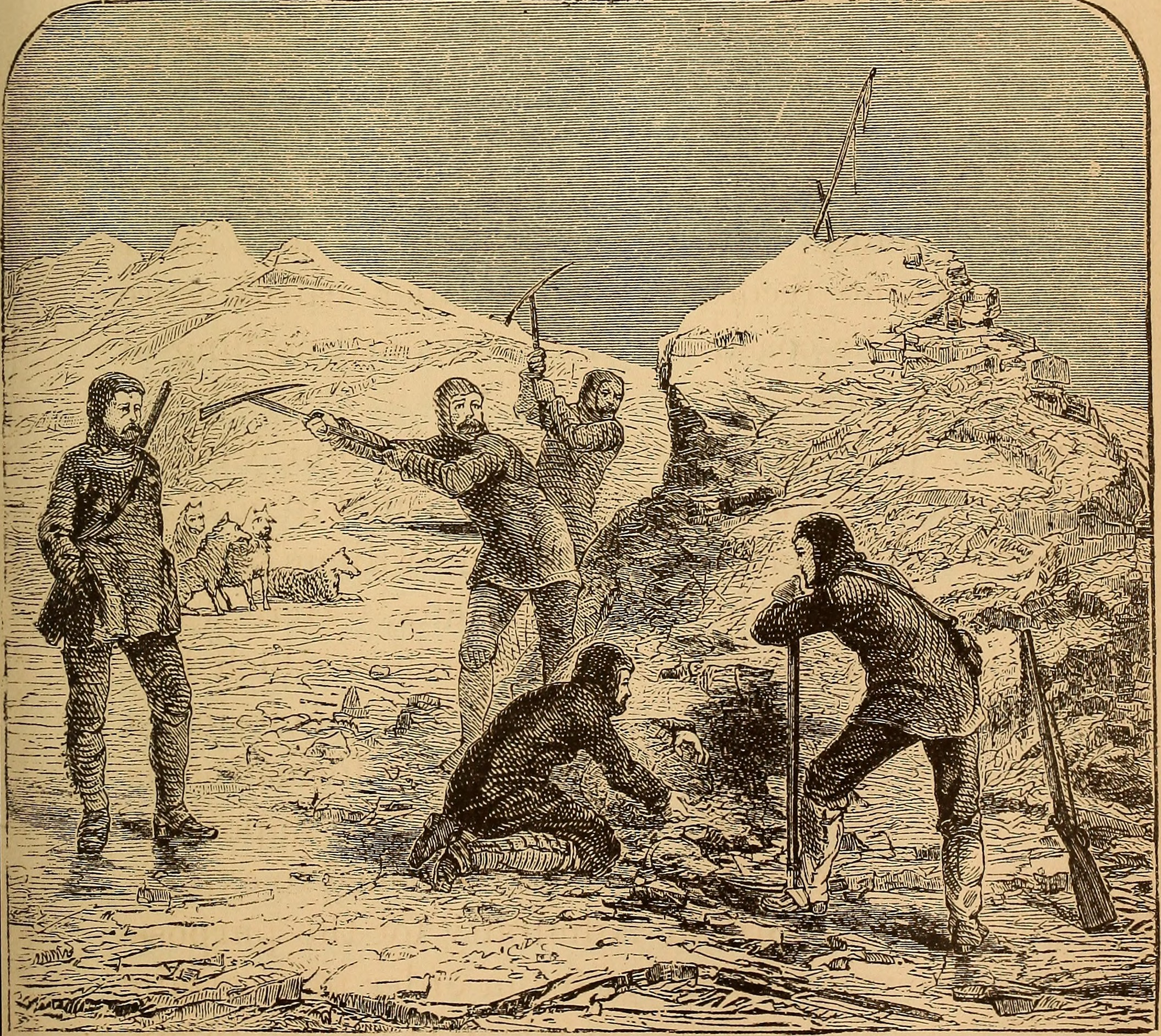
Discovery of the cairn at Victory Point in 1859

In 1859, Hobson found the second note deposited by Gore and his team in the cairn a few miles southwest at Gore Point using the same Admiralty form and containing an almost identical duplicate of the first message from 1847. This document did not contain the second message added by Fitzjames and Crozier in 1848 found on the Victory Point Note after the abandonment of the ships and subsequent recovery of the document from the Victory Point cairn.

From the handwriting, it is assumed that all the messages were written by Commander James Fitzjames. As he did not take part in the landing party which deposited the notes originally in 1847, it is inferred that both documents were originally filled out by Fitzjames on board the ships with Gore and Des Voeux adding their signatures as members of the landing party. This is further supported by the fact that both documents contain the same factual errors – namely the wrong date of the wintering on Beechey Island.

As stated earlier, in 1834 Sarah and John Gore, together with their three daughters, Ann, Eliza and Charlotte and their youngest son, Edward, moved to Australia, where they firstly lived at Parramatta near Sydney. Later the family bought 1,165 acres of land near Lake Bathurst in New South Wales, where they lived in a house they named 'Gilmour', after Sarah's family.

On their deaths Sarah and Admiral John Gore were buried in St Saviour’s Cemetery in Goulburn. The inscription reads:

Sacred
to the memory
of
John Gore
late Admiral R.N.
who departed this life at Gilmour
March 6 A. D. 1853 aged 78 years
ALSO
Sarah Gore
Relict of the above who departed
this life April 7 A.D. 1857
aged 80 years
ALSO
Graham Gore
eldest son of the above aged 40 years
late Commander R.N.
supposed to have been lost
in the late Arctic Expedition with
Sir John Franklin
about AD 1850

== Legacy ==
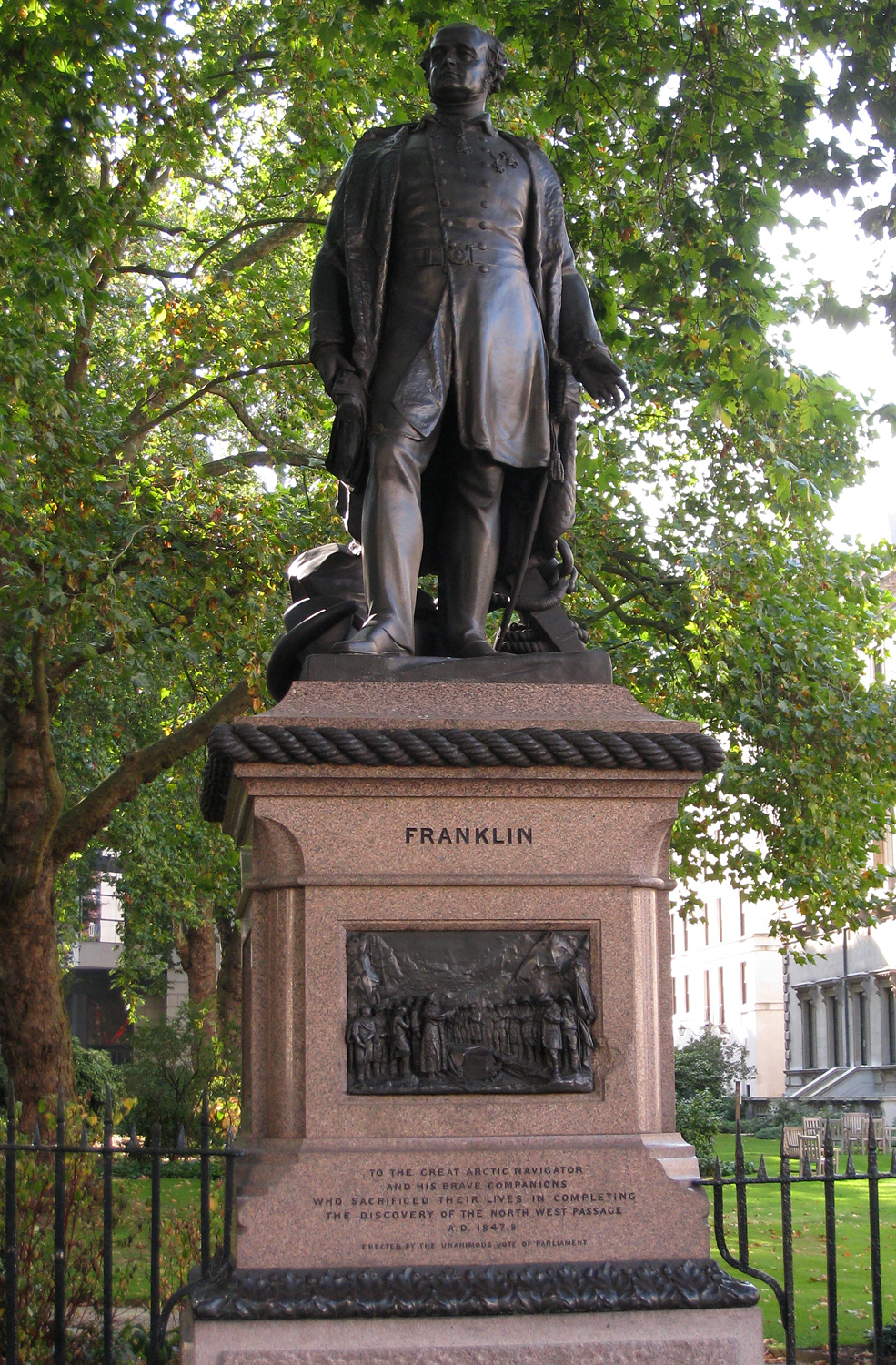
Gore is among those commemorated on Matthew Noble's 1866 monument to Franklin, Waterloo Place, London

Gore Point on King William Island was named in his honour by Sir John Franklin.

Graham Gore Peninsula in Nunavut in Canada is named for him.

Gore is among the lost named on the Franklin monument erected in Waterloo Place in London in 1866. Inscribed 'To the great arctic navigator and his brave companions who sacrificed their lives in completing the discovery of the North West Passage. A.D. 1847 – 8', Gore's name can be found on the 'Erebus' plinth.

Gore appears as a character in the 2007 novel The Terror by Dan Simmons, a fictionalized account of Franklin's lost expedition, as well as the 2018 television adaptation, where he is played by Tom Weston-Jones. Episode 2 in the series is titled 'Gore'.

Gore appears as one of the main characters in the 2024 science fiction novel The Ministry of Time by Kaliane Bradley.
