= Edward Little (Royal Navy officer) =

19th-century Royal Navy officer

- Born: 14 December 1811; London, England
- Died: c. 1848
- Military career
- Branch: Royal Navy
- Rank: Commander (Royal Navy)
- Known for: Franklin's lost expedition

Edward Little (14 December 1811 – c. 1848) was a British Royal Navy officer. He first served as a Lieutenant aboard HMS Donegal. During his career he also served aboard HMS Vindictive where he first met Sir John Franklin. He volunteered to serve on the Franklin Expedition where he served under Captain Francis Crozier. The expedition's mission was to find the Northwest Passage which could make for a new sea route to China.

== Early life ==
Edward Little was born 14 December 1811 in London, England. He was the son of Simon Little, who served as a Clerk aboard HMS Audacious. Little was baptized on 12 January 1812 at the St. Mary's Church in the parish of Hornsey. He was described as being 5' 9", with a fair complexion, hazel eyes, brown hair, and no noticeable scars or other marks.

== Naval service ==
Little joined the Royal Navy on 3 June 1826, at the age of fifteen years old. He first served as Volunteer aboard HMS Forte. In 1834, Little passed his Lieutenancy examination. He was promoted to the position of Lieutenant on the 30 December 1837 and the same day he started his service aboard HMS Donegal. He served on it for three years before he left. Then he spent one year aboard HMS Britannia.

After this appointment he started his service aboard HMS Vindictive on 6 May 1842. During his time aboard HMS Vindictive, Little met Sir John Franklin and his wife when they visited the ship. A party was hosted by the crew during which Little and Lieutenant Stewart were explaining the different objects of the party. When the French captured Tahiti, HMS Vindictive was sent there for diplomatic reasons. Captain Toup Nicolas sent Little and Lieutenant Hill on a small schooner to the West Indies because the situation on Tahiti became more complicated. The route meant that they had to walk overland at Panama. His service aboard HMS Vindictive officially ended when he arrived back to England. After a short discharge he served aboard HMS Victory and HMS Albion.

== Franklin Expedition ==
Little signed up for HMS Terror on 4 March 1845, just a few weeks before the expedition set sail. In one of his letters Crozier described Little as "really a very superior fellow." During this time he was promoted in absentia to the rank of Commander by the Admiralty on 9 November 1846.

All of the crew members were officially declared dead in the March of 1854. No remains or personal belongings have been identified as belonging to Little.

== Legacy ==
Little Point on the western side of King William Island was named after him. Southeast from this location were found 23 human bones, belonging to at least two individuals. Explorer William Penny named Little Cape located on Dundas Island in Wellington Channel, in memory of Edward Little.

Little appears as a secondary character in the 2007 novel The Terror written by Dan Simmons, as well as the 2018 television adaptation, where he is played by Matthew McNulty.
