= Henry Le Vesconte =

British naval officer and polar explorer

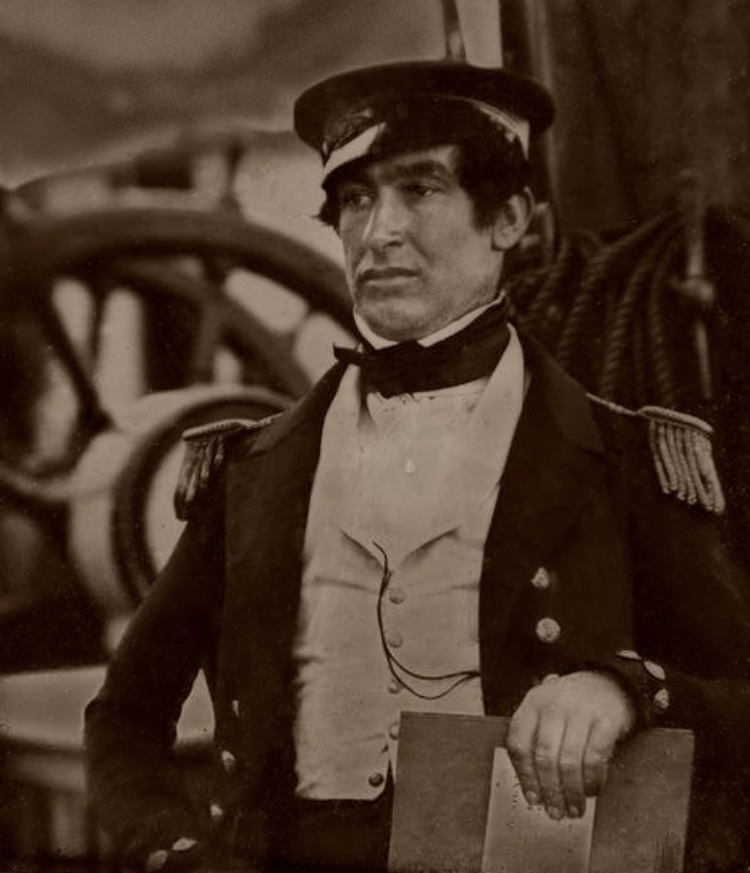
- Lieutenant H.T.D. Le Vesconte in 1845 holding a copy of Marryat's Code of Signals; behind him is the ship's wheel of HMS Erebus, the only contemporary photograph of the ship ever taken
- Born: Henry Thomas Dundas Le Vesconte c. 1813; Netherton, Devon, England
- Died: 1848 (aged 34–35); King William Island, North-Western Territory (now Nunavut, Canada)
- Occupation: Naval officer
- Known for: Crew member of HMS Erebus

Henry Thomas Dundas Le Vesconte (c. 1813 – c. 1848) was an English officer of the Royal Navy and polar explorer who from 1845 served under Sir John Franklin as Second Lieutenant (the fourth most senior rank) on the Erebus during the Franklin expedition to discover the Northwest Passage, which ended with the loss of all 129 crewmen.

== Early life ==
Born in Netherton in Devon, England in about 1813, he was the eldest son of seven children, born to Sarah née Wills and Henry Le Vesconte, a Commander in the Royal Navy who had fought as a Lieutenant on the Jamaica at the Battle of Copenhagen in 1801 and later received a commendation from Nelson for the capture of six gun vessels on shore at St Valery. With the same rank he fought at the Battle of Trafalgar in 1805 on the Naiad under Captain Thomas Dundas.

Of French descent, Henry Thomas Dundas Le Vesconte was named after his father and his father's commanding officer at Trafalgar.

Le Vesconte’s younger brother was Dr. Philip John Le Vesconte (c.1816-1894) who later became the first resident physician in King's Cove, Newfoundland.

== Naval career ==
He followed his father into the Royal Navy on 19 May 1829, joining the Herald as a first-class volunteer, joined the Britannia on 22 November 1831, and was made Midshipman on 15 March 1832. He transferred to the frigate Endymion in December 1834, serving on her until 1836 under Captain Sir Samuel Roberts. He won his Lieutenancy by 'repeated acts of conspicuous gallantry', as Mate of the Calliope in the China War (1841), assisted at the destruction of a 20-gun battery at the back of the island of Anunghoy on 23 February 1841 and on 13 March 1841 served in the boats at the capture of several rafts and of the last fort protecting the approaches to Canton. He was similarly employed at the capture of that city on 18 March 1841 and, during the second series of hostilities against it, was afresh engaged in the boats at the destruction on 26 May of the whole line of defences, extending about two miles from the British factory.

In consequence of these performances he was promoted to the rank of Lieutenant by commission on 8 June 1841. His later appointments were: 16 October 1841 to the Hyacinth under Captain George Goldsmith, in the East Indies; 15 June 1842, to the Clio as First Lieutenant under Captain Edward Norwich Troubridge and from 30 December 1842 under Captain James Fitzjames, with whom he was for upwards of two years employed on the same station and off the coast of Africa in cruises to suppress the slave trade; from 17 December 1844, as Senior, to the Superb under Captain Armar Lowry Corry, attached to the Channel Squadron.

== Franklin Expedition ==
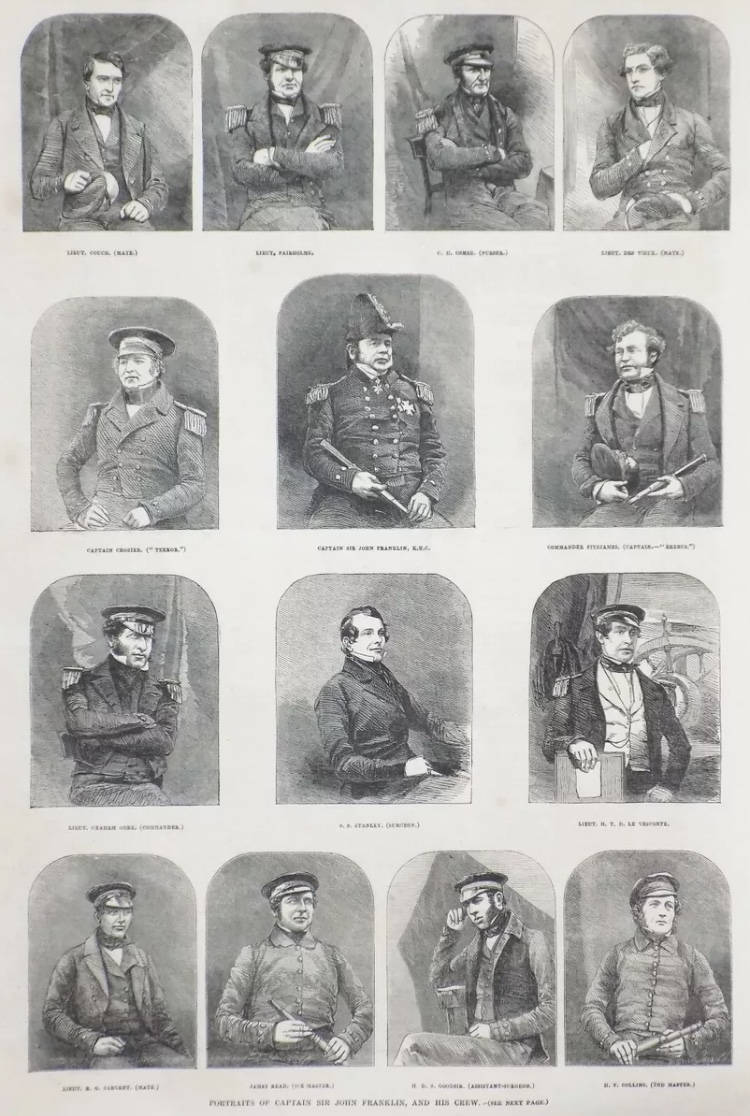
Sir John Franklin and some of his officers - Le Vesconte (third row, right) - The Illustrated London News (1845)

Fitzjames recommended Le Vesconte's appointment to the discovery-ship Erebus under Captain Sir John Franklin, which he joined on 4 March 1845 as she was fitting out for the polar expedition at Woolwich Dockyard and in which he was involved in a renewed attempt to explore the Northwest Passage through Lancaster Sound and Bering Strait. He was among twelve officers of the Franklin Expedition who posed for daguerreotypes by photographer Richard Beard at the docks before sailing.

The expedition set sail from Greenhithe, Kent, on the morning of 19 May 1845, with a crew of 24 officers and 110 men. The ships stopped briefly in Stromness, Orkney Islands, in northern Scotland. From there they sailed to Greenland with HMS Rattler and a transport ship, Baretto Junior; the passage to Greenland took 30 days.

At the Whalefish Islands in Disko Bay, on the west coast of Greenland, Le Vesconte surveyed ashore with his friend James Fitzjames, who recorded that Franklin was "much pleased with him". Here 10 oxen carried on Baretto Junior were slaughtered for fresh meat which was transferred to Erebus and Terror. Crew members then wrote their last letters home, which recorded that Franklin had banned swearing and drunkenness. Le Vesconte sent a number of letters and sketches home as Erebus sailed north into Baffin Bay late in 1845. But after that, as with the expedition as a whole, few details of his later activities are known. Five men were discharged due to sickness and sent home on Rattler and Barretto Junior, reducing the final crew to 129 men. In late July 1845 the whalers Prince of Wales (Captain Dannett) and Enterprise (Captain Robert Martin) encountered Terror and Erebus in Baffin Bay, where they were waiting for good conditions to cross to Lancaster Sound. The expedition was never seen again by Europeans.

Only limited information is available for subsequent events, pieced together over the next 150 years by other expeditions, explorers, scientists and interviews with Inuit. Franklin's men spent the winter of 1845–46 on Beechey Island, where three crew members died and were buried. After travelling down Peel Sound through the summer of 1846, Terror and Erebus became trapped in ice off King William Island in September 1846 and are thought never to have sailed again. It is possible Le Vesconte was alive into 1848, perhaps starving to death in that year with the last surviving remnants of the crew.

A pocket chronometer marked "Parkinson & Frodsham 980" was issued to Erebus in 1845 and signed out by Le Vesconte. It was found by William R. Hobson's sledge team, of the McClintock search expedition, on 24 May 1859 at a place where one of the ships' boats was discovered on the coast of Erebus Bay on King William Island. It was positioned near one set of human remains, in the position that would have been the skeleton's trouser pocket.

He is commemorated with two points of land in the Arctic - Point Le Vesconte on the south-west coast of Baillie-Hamilton Island, and another with a similar name on the west coast of King William Island.

=== Last will and testament ===
On his retirement in 1834 his father had moved to Newfoundland in Canada, taking his wife and three daughters with him. The will Henry Thomas Dundas Le Vesconte wrote is unusual in that it was actually written, witnessed, and signed aboard the Erebus on 15 May 1845 as he prepared to sail with Franklin just four days later. The witnesses were fellow Erebus sailors Lieutenant James Walter Fairholme and Carpenter John Weekes. It was finally proved in 1854, in which year he was officially declared deceased. Beginning with, "I, Henry Thos. Dundas Le Vesconte, Lt. in the Royal Navy, being about to proceed on a Voyage of Discovery in the Polar Seas, and desirous to dispose of what property I may be possessed of, in the event of my death, do make this solemn Will and Testament", he left bequests to his cousin Henrietta Le Feuvre and to his sisters Rose Henrietta Le Vesconte, Charlotte Sarah Le Vesconte and Anna Maria Le Vesconte.

== Legacy ==
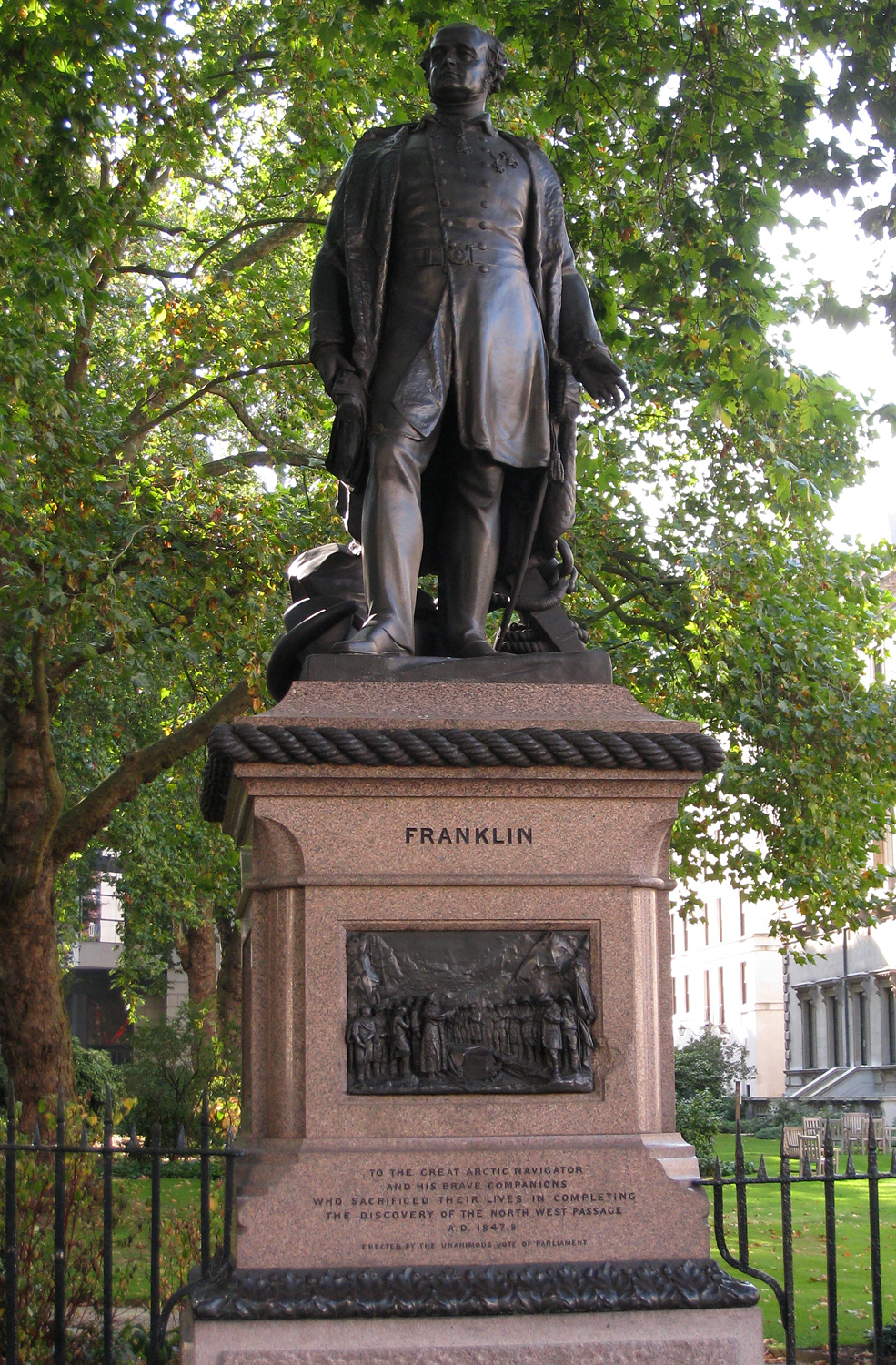
Le Vesconte is among those commemorated on Matthew Noble's 1866 monument to Franklin, Waterloo Place, London

Le Vesconte is among the lost named on the Franklin monument erected in Waterloo Place in London in 1866. Inscribed 'To the great arctic navigator and his brave companions who sacrificed their lives in completing the discovery of the North West Passage. A.D. 1847 - 8', his name can be found on the 'Erebus' plinth.

Le Vesconte appears as a character in the 2007 novel, The Terror by Dan Simmons, a fictionalized account of Franklin's lost expedition, as well as the 2018 television adaptation, where he is played by Declan Hannigan.

== Artifacts and remains ==
Le Vesconte's personal diary written in retrospect of his time on the China coast on board HMS Calliope, Cornwallis and Clio during the period January 1841 to October 1844 is in the collection of the National Maritime Museum.

While exploring the Boothia Peninsula in 1854 the search expedition led by John Rae made contact with local Inuit at Repulse Bay from whom he obtained much information about the fate of the Franklin expedition. From the same party of Inuit Rae recovered four table forks that had been the property of Le Vesconte. When in March 1859 Francis McClintock and his expedition found a group of Inuit at Cape Victoria they retrieved a dessert spoon that similarly had been owned by Le Vesconte. They found a similar spoon in May 1859 in the boat at the Boat Place. These also are in the collection of the National Maritime Museum.

Between 1859 and 1949 skeletal remains representing at least 30 individuals were discovered on King William Island, and most were buried locally. In 1869 American explorer Charles Francis Hall was taken by local Inuit to a shallow grave on King William Island containing well-preserved skeletal remains and fragments of clothing thought to be those of an officer due to the remnants of a silk vest in which the body had been clothed and a gold tooth filling. These were repatriated and interred beneath the Franklin Memorial at Greenwich Old Royal Naval College, London. After examination by the eminent biologist Thomas Henry Huxley, the Admiralty concluded that the remains were those of Le Vesconte.

A subsequent re-examination in 2009 of the "well-preserved and fairly complete skeleton of a young adult male of European ancestry" included a facial reconstruction that showed "excellence of fit" with the face of Harry Goodsir, Erebus' assistant surgeon, as portrayed in his 1845 daguerreotype. Strontium and oxygen isotope data from tooth enamel were consistent with an upbringing in eastern Scotland (Goodsir was from Anstruther in Fife, on Scotland's eastern coast) rather than Le Vesconte's upbringing in southwest England. A further clue suggesting these might be Goodsir's remains was a gold filling in a premolar tooth, unusual at that time. Goodsir's family were friendly with Robert Nasmyth, an Edinburgh dentist with an international reputation for such work. Based on analysis of DNA with living descendants, the skeleton of an officer found on King William Island (sample NhLh-12:18) does not belong to Le Vesconte.

A fragment of the Erebus ship's wheel seen in Vesconte's 1845 portrait was recovered from the shipwreck in September 2015.

== See also ==
- List of people who disappeared at sea
- List of unsolved deaths

== Sources ==
- Cyriax, Richard (1939). Sir John Franklin's Last Arctic Expedition; a Chapter in the History of the Royal Navy. London: Methuen & Co. OCLC 9183074.
