= James Walter Fairholme =

British naval officer and polar explorer (1821–1847?)

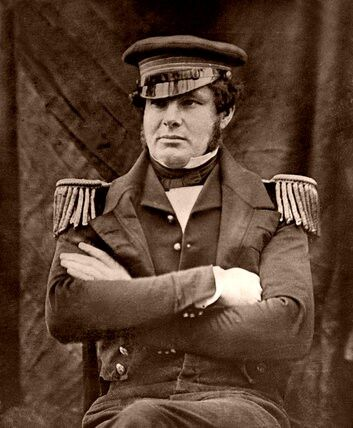
Lt. James Walter Fairholme - daguerreotype by Richard Beard (16 May 1845)

James Walter Fairholme (10 January 1821 – after 24 May 1847) was a British Royal Navy officer and polar explorer who in 1845 served under Sir John Franklin on the Erebus during the Franklin expedition to discover the Northwest Passage, which ended with the loss of all 129 officers and crew.

He was born in Kinnoull in Perth, Scotland in 1821, the second of five children of the Hon. Caroline Elisabeth née Forbes (born 1799) and George Fairholme (1789–1846), a land owner, banker, traveller, naturalist and scriptural geologist. His siblings included George Knight Erskine Fairholme (1822–1889) and Elizabeth Marjory Fairholme. Through his mother he was a grandson of James Ochoncar Forbes, 17th Lord Forbes.

== Naval career ==
Fairholme joined the Royal Navy on 12 March 1834 aged 13 as a First-class Volunteer on board the Gannet under Captain John Balfour Maxwell, with whom, and with Commodore Sir John Strutt Peyton, of the Madagascar, he served on the West India station, part of the time as Midshipman, until despatched as second in command of a prize-slaver to the coast of Africa, where he was wrecked on 7 April 1838, and taken prisoner by the Moors. Being, however, rescued on the banks of the Senegal 16 days afterwards, while on his journey inland with the rest of his shipmates, by a party of French black native troops under a government officer, Fairholme returned to England, and in December 1839 joined the Ganges under the command of Captain Barrington Reynolds.

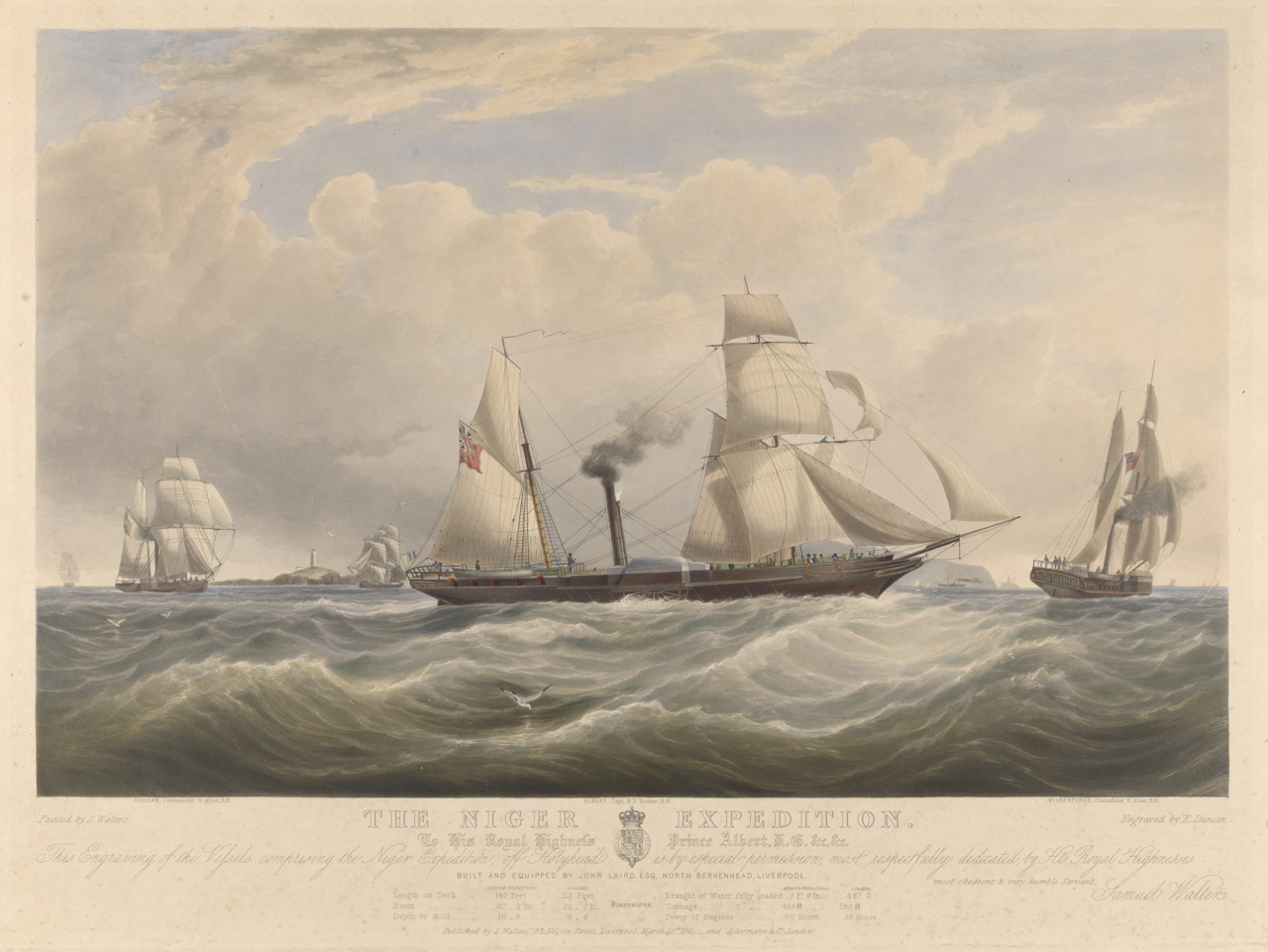
The Niger Expedition - off Holyhead, 1841. HMS Albert also shows HMS Sudan and HMS Wilberforce - Fairholme served as Mate on the Albert

After sharing in the bombardment of Beirut and in the early operations of the Syrian War, he became attached, towards the close of 1840, to an expedition fitting for the exploration of the Niger, whither he sailed in 1841, as Mate, on board the Albert steamer under Captain Henry Dundas Trotter, one of the three small steamers sent to explore the Niger. Having ascended that river as far as Egga, a distance of 350 miles from the sea, he returned to Cape Coast Castle in September 1841.

Fairholme was promoted to the rank of Lieutenant on 31 January 1842 and in March 1842 was invalided home with a tropical fever. He was after appointed in succession – 20 April 1843, to the gunnery-ship Excellent at Portsmouth under Captain Sir Thomas Hastings; on 14 December 1844 to the Superb under Captain Armar Lowry Corry at Devonport – and, on 13 March 1845, to the Erebus discovery-ship under Captain Sir John Franklin, employed in an attempt to explore a north-west passage through Lancaster Sound and Bering Strait.

== Franklin Expedition ==
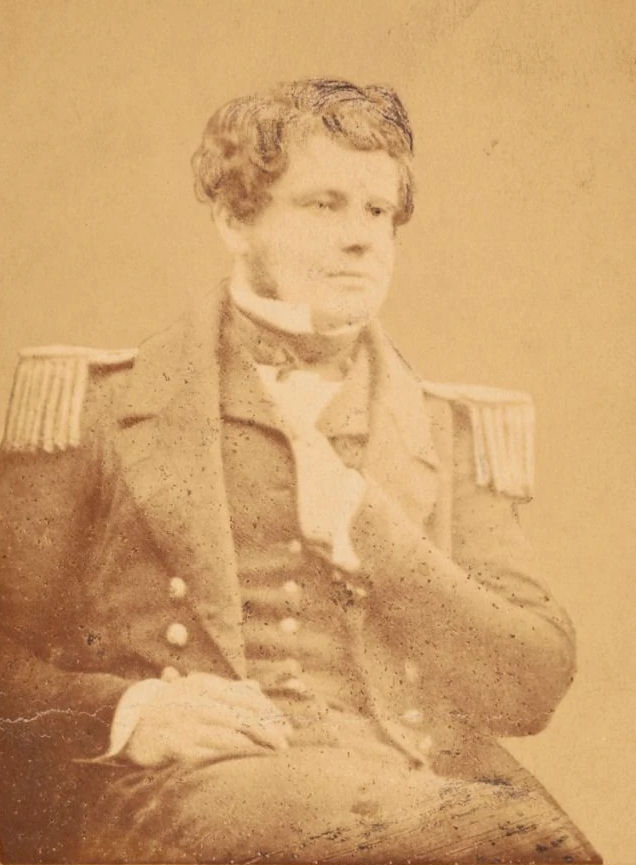
"Lady Franklin said she thought it made me look too old" - James Walter Fairholme by Richard Beard (16 May 1845)

On 13 March 1845 Fairholme joined the crew of the discovery ship Erebus on its Northwest Passage explorative expedition. As Third Lieutenant he was the fifth most senior officer on board after Captain Sir John Franklin and Commander James Fitzjames, the latter describing him as, "a smart, agreeable companion, and a well-informed man".

Lady Jane Franklin commissioned daguerreotype photographs of the twelve senior officers of the Erebus including Fairholme and Captain Francis Crozier of the Terror from photographer Richard Beard. These were taken on board the Erebus at the dockside in Greenhithe on 16 May 1845, just before the ships sailed. In Fairholme's letter to his father he mentions that he had had to borrow Commander Fitzjames's jacket for the picture to save him having to find his own. At the same time several officers, including Fairholme, had a second private daguerreotype taken, with Fairholme mentioning the photographic session in a letter written to his father shortly after:

I hope Elizabeth [his sister] got my photograph. Lady Franklin said she thought it made me look too old, but as I had Fitzjames’ coat on at the time, to save myself the trouble of getting my own, you will perceive that I am a Commander! and have anchors on the epaulettes so it will do capitally when that really is the case.

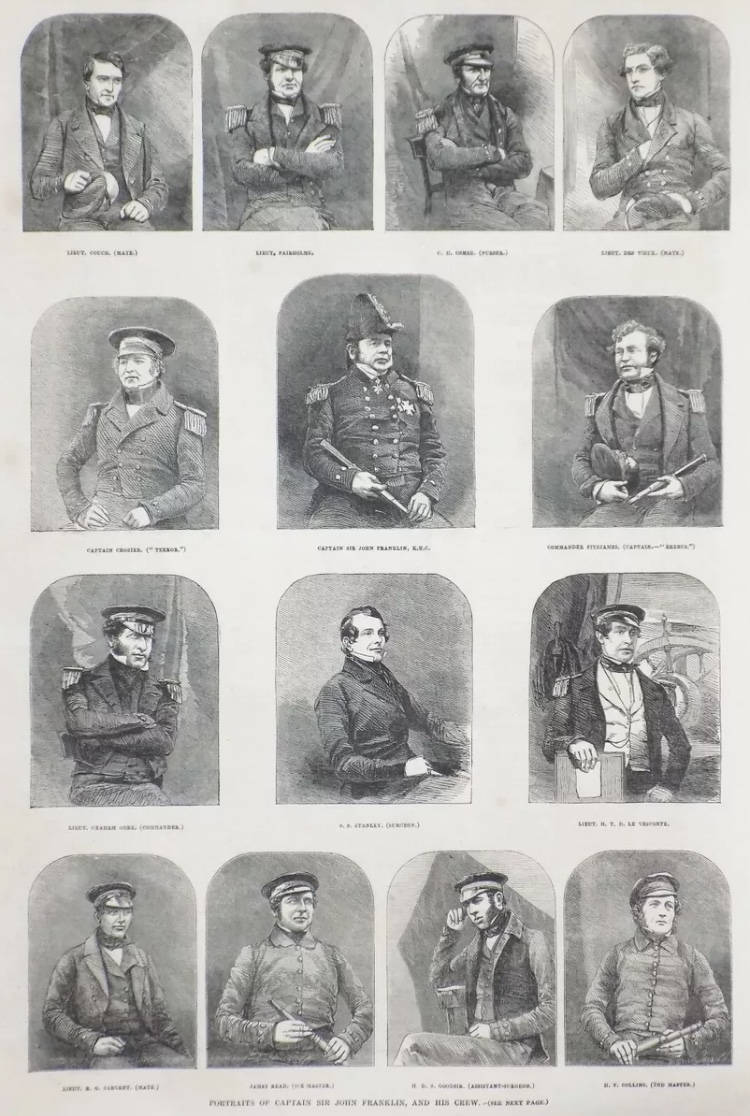
Sir John Franklin and some of his crew - Fairholme (top row, second from left) - The Illustrated London News (1845)

The expedition set sail from Greenhithe, Kent, on the morning of 19 May 1845, with a crew of 24 officers and 110 men. The ships stopped briefly in Stromness, Orkney Islands, in northern Scotland. From there they sailed to Greenland with HMS Rattler and a transport ship, Baretto Junior; the passage to Greenland took 30 days.

At the Whalefish Islands in Disko Bay, on the west coast of Greenland, 10 oxen carried on Baretto Junior were slaughtered for fresh meat which was transferred to Erebus and Terror. Crew members then wrote their last letters home, which recorded that Franklin had banned swearing and drunkenness. Fairholme used this opportunity to send a last letter to his father:

All well with the expedition + very comfortable. Lady Franklin has given us amongst other presents, a capital monkey, which with old Neptune, a Newfoundland dog and one cat is all the pets allowed. At present Saturday night seems to be kept up in true nautical form around my cabin, a fiddle going as hard as it can + 2 or 3 different songs from the forecastle. In short all seems quite happy...

Five men were discharged due to sickness and sent home on Rattler and Barretto Junior, reducing the final crew to 129 men. In late July 1845 the whalers Prince of Wales (Captain Dannett) and Enterprise (Captain Robert Martin) encountered Terror and Erebus in Baffin Bay, where they were waiting for good conditions to cross to Lancaster Sound. The expedition was never seen again by Europeans. Fairholme's fate is unknown, but he probably starved to death with the last of the crew in 1848.

On 31 March 1854 the Admiralty removed the name of Sir John Franklin and his officers and men from their books, presuming that they all had perished, and arrangements were made to distribute the back-dated pay to their dependents. Fairholme was declared legally dead in 1858 after the case of Fairholme v Fairholme in Scotland, in a legal dispute concerning a large sum of money left to Fairholme by his uncle, Adam Fairholme, who died in 1853. The case hinged on whether James Fairholme had predeceased his uncle, or had died after him. The Court's judgement, based on evidence produced by Captain John Rae, among others, was that Lt. Fairholme had died before 1853 and therefore could not have survived his uncle.

== Artifacts ==
When in 1854 the Arctic explorer John Rae and his search party located a group of Inuit at Repulse Bay among the items they were given were a fork and a spoon that belonged to Fairholme. The Inuit said that they had found the material at a camp to the north west of the mouth of the Back River where a party of Europeans had died of starvation. On the spoon were also scratched the initials of caulker's mate Cornelius Hickey. The presence of initials of crew members marked on officer's silver cutlery suggests that it may have been an attempt to save it.

On 7 May 1859 a party from the McClintock Search Expedition 1857-9 led by McClintock himself bought a silver fiddle-pattern teaspoon belonging to Lieutenant Fairholme from the Inuit at Cape Norton, on the East Coast of King William Island. These spoons are in the collection of the National Maritime Museum in London.

The salt print image of Fairholme mentioned above together with his posthumously awarded Arctic Medal 1818-1855 and a silver dessert fork that he took with him aboard the Erebus in 1845 form part of the Lieutenant James Walter Fairholme Collection in the collection of the Canadian Museum of History.

In 2019 divers from Parks Canada found and brought to the surface a pair of lieutenant's epaulettes, probably from Fairholme's dress uniform, located in his cabin on the wreck of the Erebus.

== Legacy ==
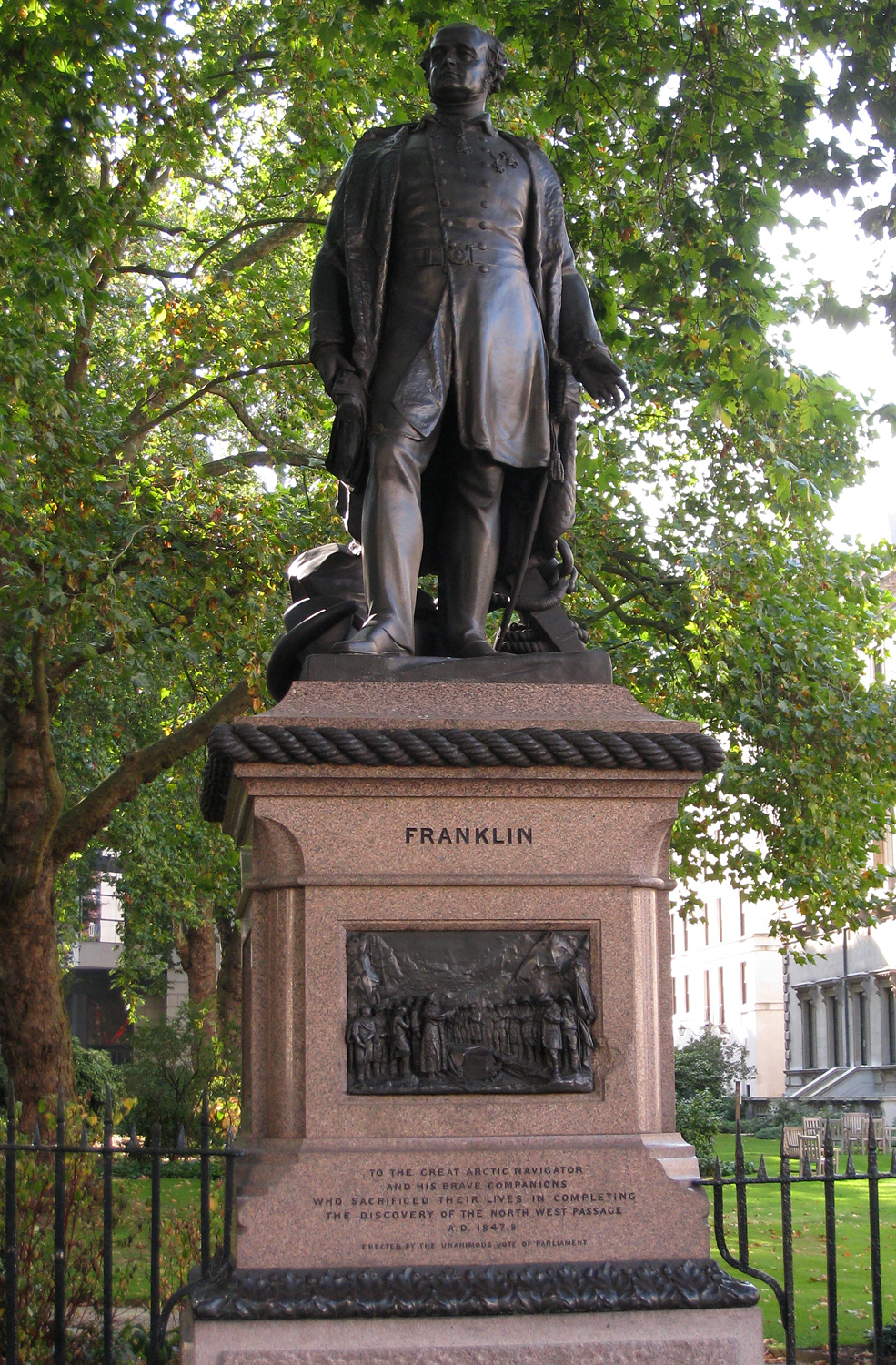
Fairholme is among those commemorated on Matthew Noble's 1866 monument to Franklin, Waterloo Place, London

Fairholme is among the lost named on the Franklin monument erected in Waterloo Place in London in 1866. Inscribed 'To the great arctic navigator and his brave companions who sacrificed their lives in completing the discovery of the North West Passage. A.D. 1847 - 8', his name can be found on the 'Erebus' plinth.

He appears as a minor character in the 2007 novel, The Terror by Dan Simmons, a fictionalized account of Franklin's lost expedition, as well as the 2018 television adaptation in which Fairholme is put in charge of a sledge party by Captain Francis Crozier with the aim of making it to Fort Resolution in order to rescue the rest of the crew. Later it is discovered that Fairholme and his men only managed to travel 18 miles before being killed by the Tuunbaq, their boat and severed heads being discovered in the snow.

== Sources ==
- Cyriax, Richard (1939). Sir John Franklin's Last Arctic Expedition; a Chapter in the History of the Royal Navy. London: Methuen & Co. OCLC 9183074.
