= Northwest Passage Trail =

Heritage trail in Nunavut, Canada

Coordinates: 68°37′52″N 095°53′03″W

The Northwest Passage Trail is located at Gjoa Haven, on King William Island in the Kitikmeot Region of Nunavut, Canada. The park consists of six areas that show in part the history of the exploration of the Northwest Passage and the first successful passage by Roald Amundsen in the Gjøa.

The park begins at the Nattilik Heritage Centre in Gjoa Haven. The centre contains a replica of the Gjøa and the first salvaged items from the wrecks of John Franklin's ships, HMS Erebus and HMS Terror, along with examples of traditional Inuit tools and clothing and a history of the Netsilik.

The second site is the former Hudson's Bay Company (HBC) site. This is where the HBC and the Canalaska Trading Company moved to in 1927. The buildings are still in use today by The North West Company.

The third area is Gjoa Haven proper. Amundsen entered "the finest little harbor in the world" on 9 September 1903 and spent two winters there. Along with the observations, he also spent time learning survival skills from the local Inuit, who called the area Uqsuqtuuq (much blubber).

The fourth is a cairn dedicated to Amundsen, north of the inlet, with a bronze memorial plaque describing his life, his ship and his journey. Amundsen erected here a few temporary buildings, whose only evidence remaining today are some earth mounds.

The fifth area, on the island's northwestern coast, is a grave site that is believed to be one of the places that members of Sir John Franklin's crew were buried.

The final area is a shelter where Amundsen made observations on the north magnetic pole, about 90 km (56 mi) north of Gjoa Haven. There are traces of another shelter that Amundsen used to house his instruments, a marble slab that he used to support his instruments, and a cairn dedicated to Amundsen's teacher George Von Neumayer.

== See also ==
- List of protected areas of Nunavut
