= Wrecks of HMS Erebus and HMS Terror National Historic Site =

National Historic Site of Canada in Nunavut

The Wrecks of HMS Erebus and HMS Terror National Historic Site is a National Historic Site near King William Island in the Kitikmeot Region of Nunavut. It protects the wrecks of HMS Erebus and HMS Terror, the two ships of the last expedition of Sir John Franklin, lost in the 1840s during their search for the Northwest Passage and then re-discovered in 2014 and 2016. The site is jointly managed by Parks Canada and the local Inuit. Public access to the site is not permitted.

== History ==
On 7 September 2014, the wreck of HMS Erebus was discovered by the Canadian Victoria Strait expedition in Wilmot and Crampton Bay, to the west of the Adelaide Peninsula just to the south of King William Island, in 11 m (36 ft) of water. On 12 September 2016, the wreck of HMS Terror was discovered by the Arctic Research Foundation in Terror Bay, off the southwest coast of King William Island at a depth of 21–24 m (69–79 ft).

== Geography ==
The site consists of two separate areas, one enclosing each wreck, with perimeter coordinates:

- wreck of Erebus in Wilmot and Crampton Bay: 68°14′44.8″N 98°52′22.3″W, 68°17′44.2″N 98°40′17.9″W, 68°13′15.4″N 98°32′16.2″W, 68°10′16.5″N 98°44′19.3″W
- wreck of Terror in Terror Bay: 68°54′25.45″N 98°59′42.07″W, 68°54′25.25″N 98°51′29.08″W, 68°48′46.23″N 98°51′31.25″W, 68°48′46.44″N 98°59′42.14″W

== Archaeology ==
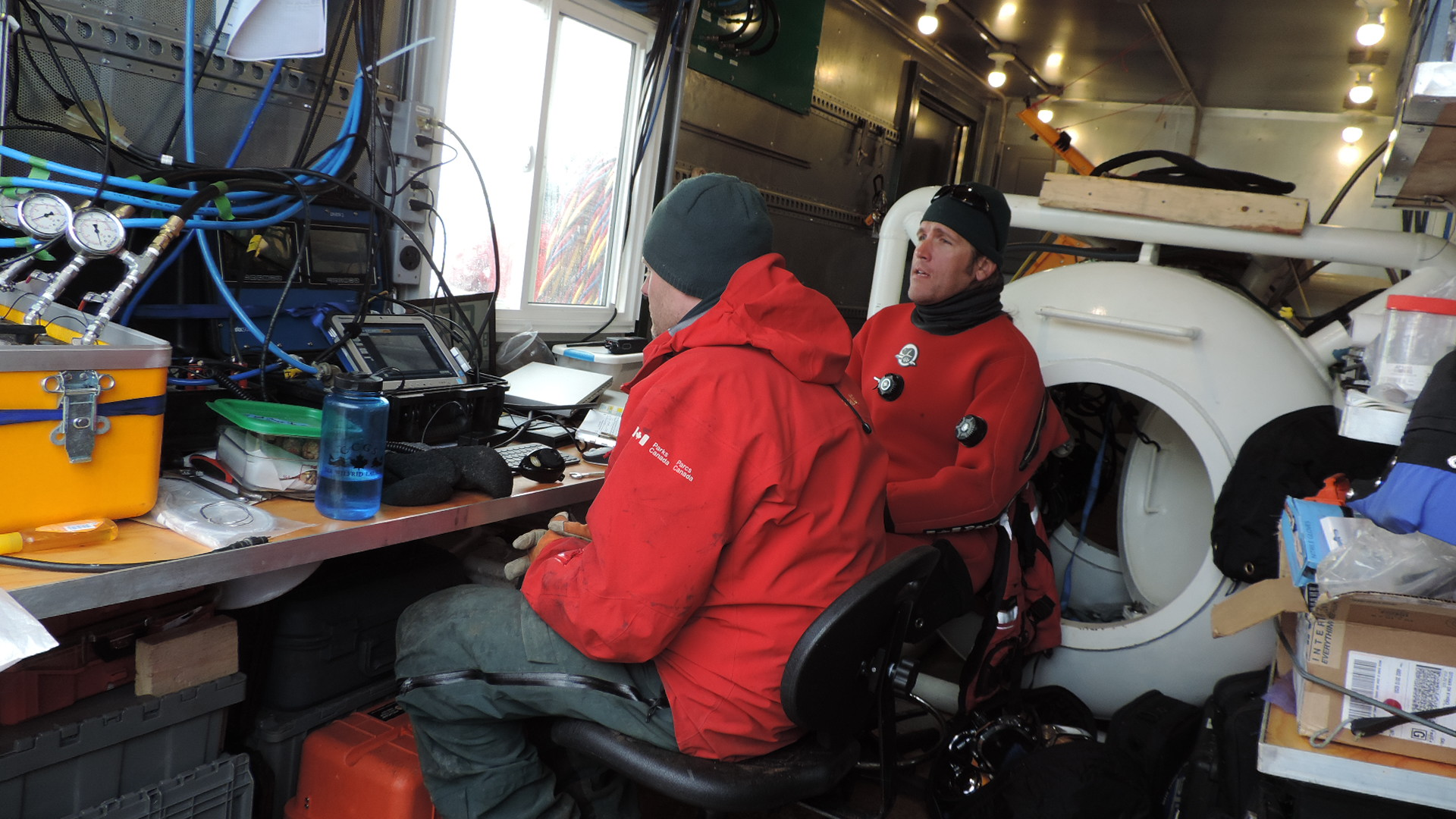
On board Parks Canada's archeology support barge "Qiniqtiryuaq" beside the wreck of HMS Erebus

As of 2019, the wrecks are the subject of archeological research undertaken by Parks Canada. Researchers are using the RV David Thompson, a scientific and research vessel, as living accommodation; and a barge "Qiniqtiryuaq" to support the diving down to the wrecks. Parks Canada is also handling the documentation and conservation of artefacts removed from the wrecks.

== Ownership ==
Under international maritime law, as Royal Navy ships, the Erebus and Terror are the property of the United Kingdom. However, in 1997 before either wreck was discovered but in the belief that the wrecks must be within Canadian waters, the United Kingdom had entered into a non-binding Memorandum of Understanding with Canada, that Canada could own the wrecks. In 1999, Canada created the new territory of Nunavut as part of the Nunavut Land Claims Agreement. Part of that agreement gave Inuit the ownership of archaeological sites and artifacts within Nunavut's boundaries.

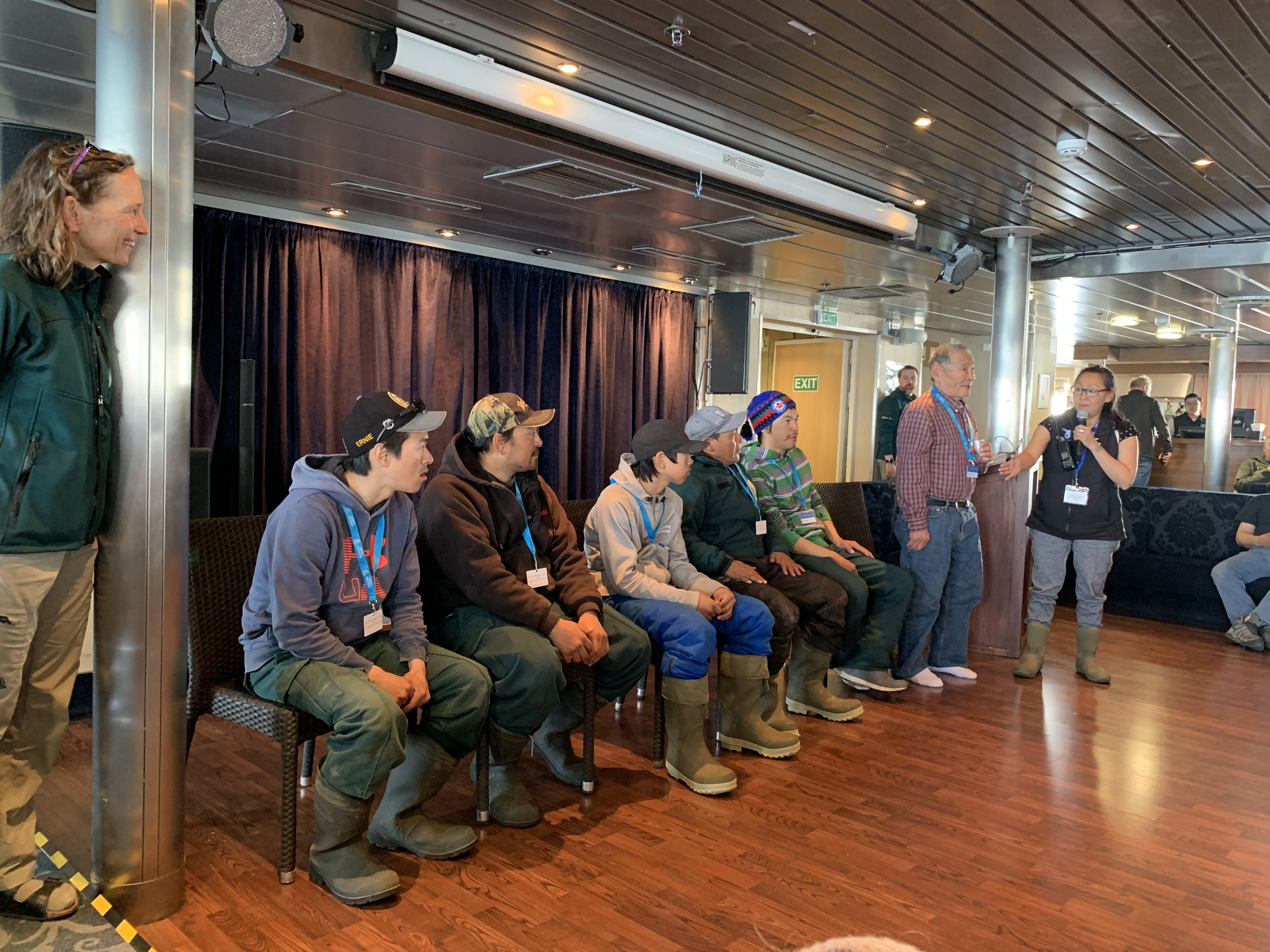
Inuit guardians from Gjoa Haven on MS Ocean Endeavour as part of the trial visitor experience, 2019

After the wrecks were discovered, there was greater need to clarify all parties' rights in relation to the wrecks. In April 2019, the United Kingdom and Canada formally agreed that the original 65 artefacts removed from the wrecks would belong to the United Kingdom, but that the wrecks themselves and further artefacts removed would belong to Canada and the Inuit Heritage Trust with the exception of gold which would belong to the United Kingdom and any human remains would be repatriated to the United Kingdom. In return, Canada would not seek payment from the United Kingdom for their costs incurred in discovering the wrecks and in removing and conserving the artefacts. In relation to the Inuit rights, the Government of Canada (represented by Parks Canada) and the Kitikmeot Inuit Association negotiated an agreement that will establish a visitor centre at Gjoa Haven as an extension of the existing Nattilik Heritage Centre. A ten-year agreement was signed in March 2023, which "sets out a new model for a cooperative relationship established between Parks Canada and Inuit", with the intention of having the wrecks progressively become a fully Inuit-led National Historic Site.

== Public access ==
Public access to the site is not allowed with the exception of Inuit, who retain hunting and fishing rights within the protected area. To protect the site from the public, Inuit from Gjoa Haven work as guardians, camping near the wreck sites to monitor access to the sites.

However, on 5 September 2019, passengers of Adventure Canada on MS Ocean Endeavour were permitted to visit the site of the wreck of HMS Erebus as part of a trial by Parks Canada in creating a visitor experience for the wreck site.
