= Gjoa Haven Airport =

Airport in Nunavut, Canada

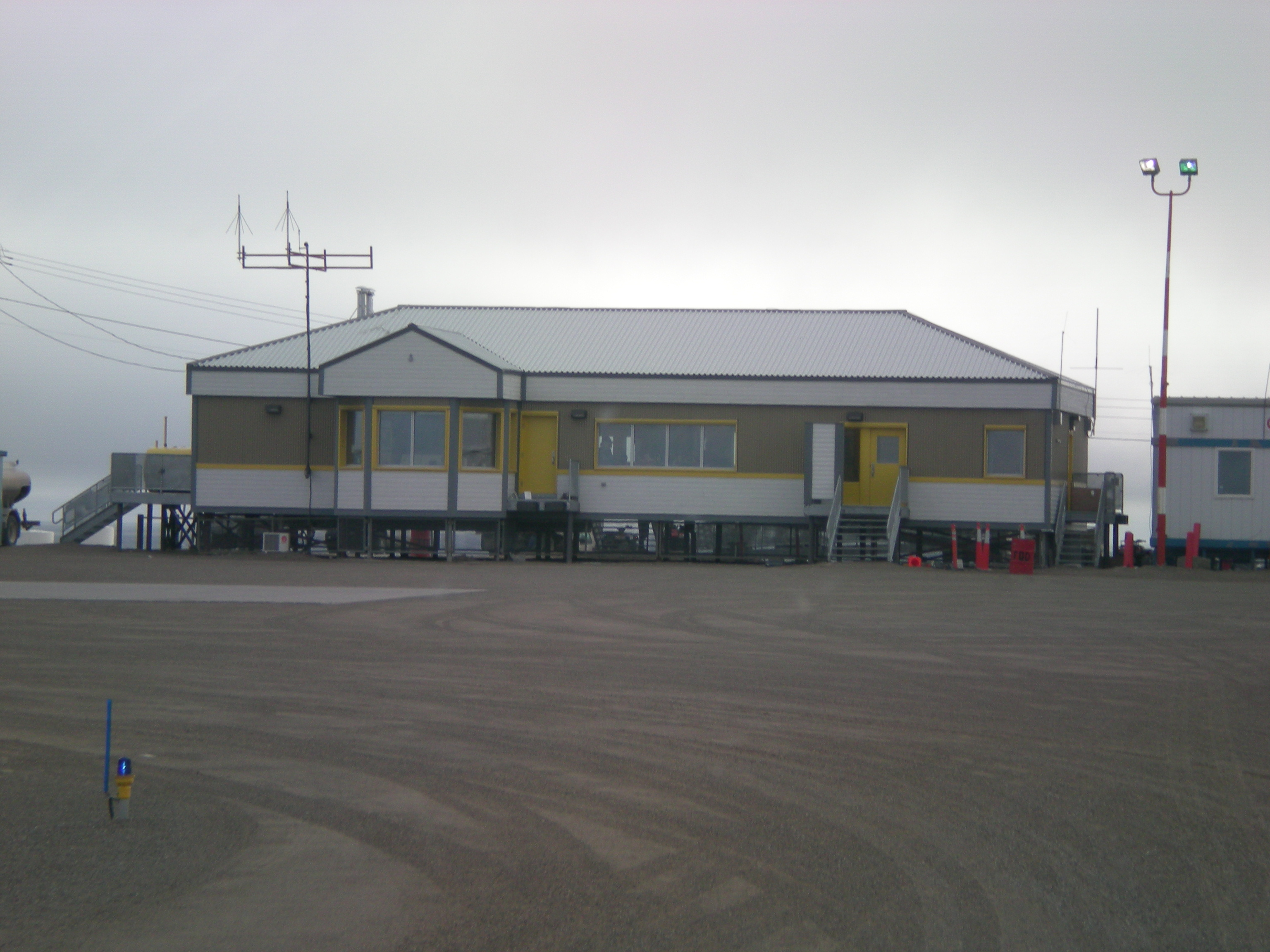
- Gjoa Haven terminal from airside
- IATA: YHK; ICAO: CYHK; WMO: 71363

Summary
- Airport type: Public
- Operator: Government of Nunavut
- Location: Gjoa Haven, Nunavut
- Time zone: MST (UTC−07:00)
  - Summer (DST): MDT (UTC−06:00)
- Elevation AMSL: 154 ft / 47 m
- Coordinates: 68°38′08″N 095°51′01″W

Map
- Location in Nunavut CYHK (Canada)

Runways
Direction	Length		Surface
Direction	ft	m	Surface
13/31	4,400	1,341	Gravel

Statistics (2010)
- Aircraft movements: 1,908
- Sources: Canada Flight Supplement; Environment Canada; Movements from Statistics Canada.

Gjoa Haven Airport (IATA: YHK, ICAO: CYHK) is located 1.5 nautical miles (2.8 km; 1.7 mi) northeast of Gjoa Haven, Nunavut, Canada, and is operated by the government of Nunavut.

The airport terminal is a single storey building and located next to several trailers. The runway and taxiways are packed gravel or dirt. The runway is not marked and, other than a non-directional beacon (NDB), lacks navigation aids.

== Airlines and destinations ==
Airlines	Destinations
Canadian North	Cambridge Bay, Kugaaruk, Taloyoak, Yellowknife

== Gjoa Haven Airport gallery ==
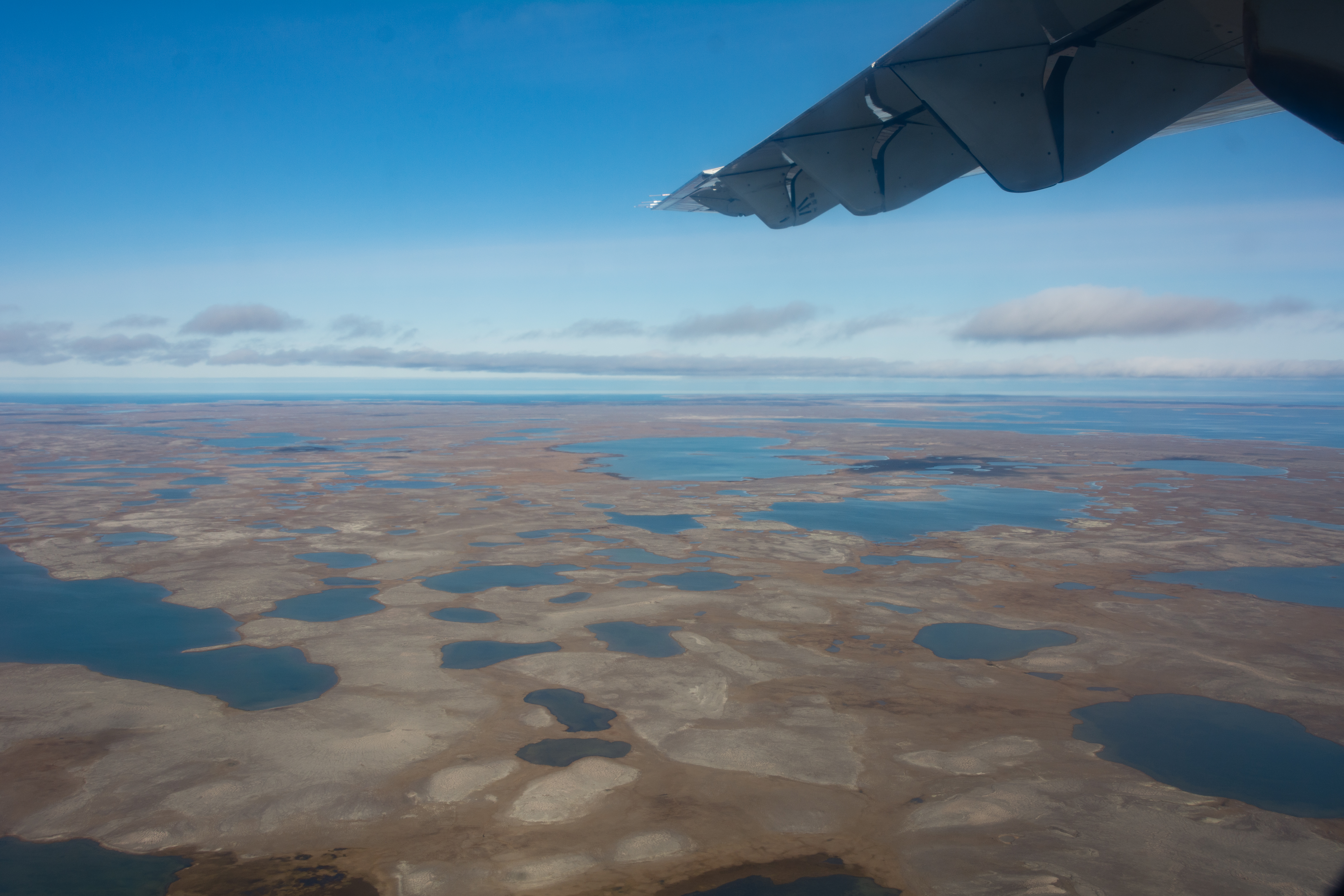
Flat terrain coming into Gjoa Haven Airport

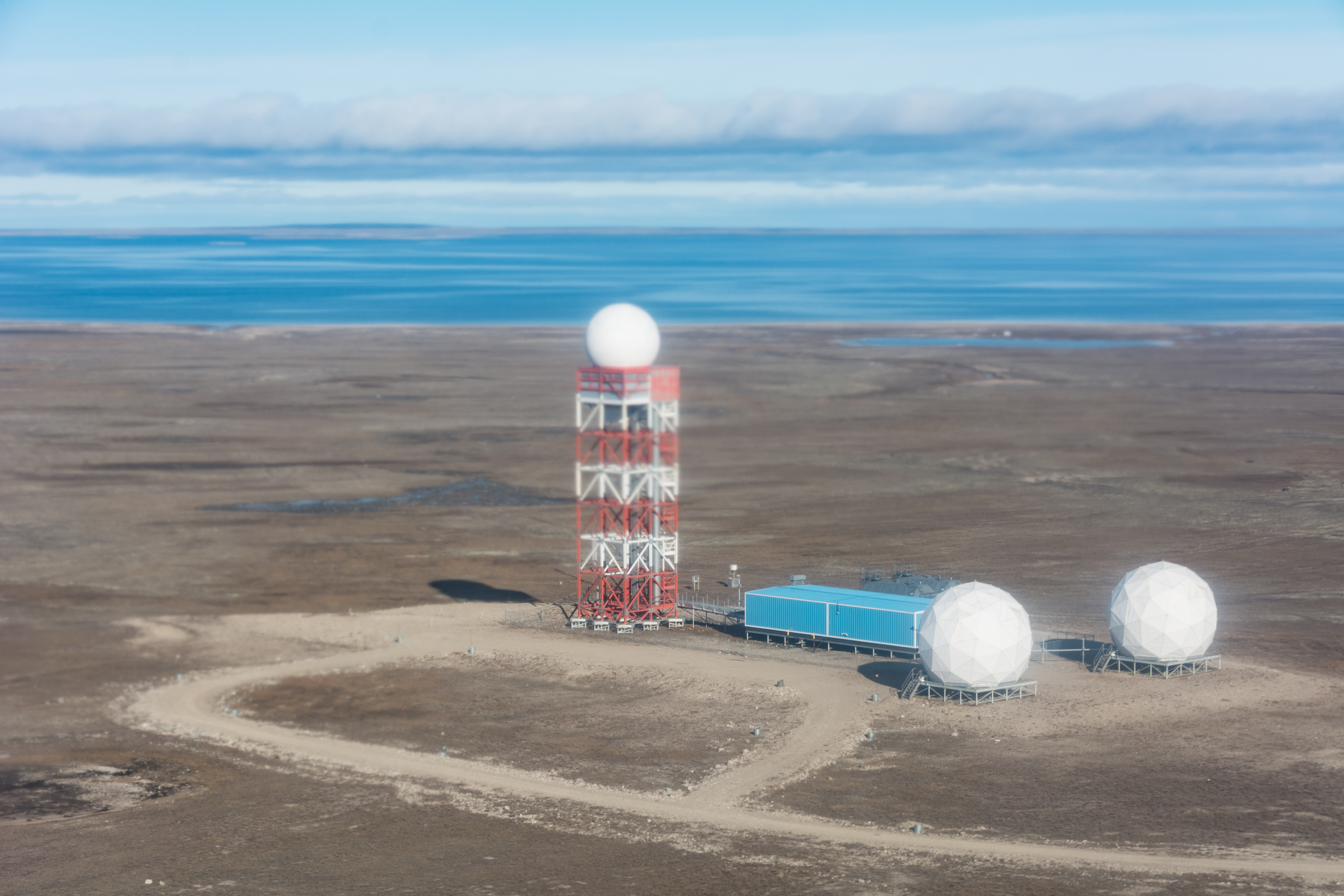
Non-directional beacon at Gjoa Haven Airport

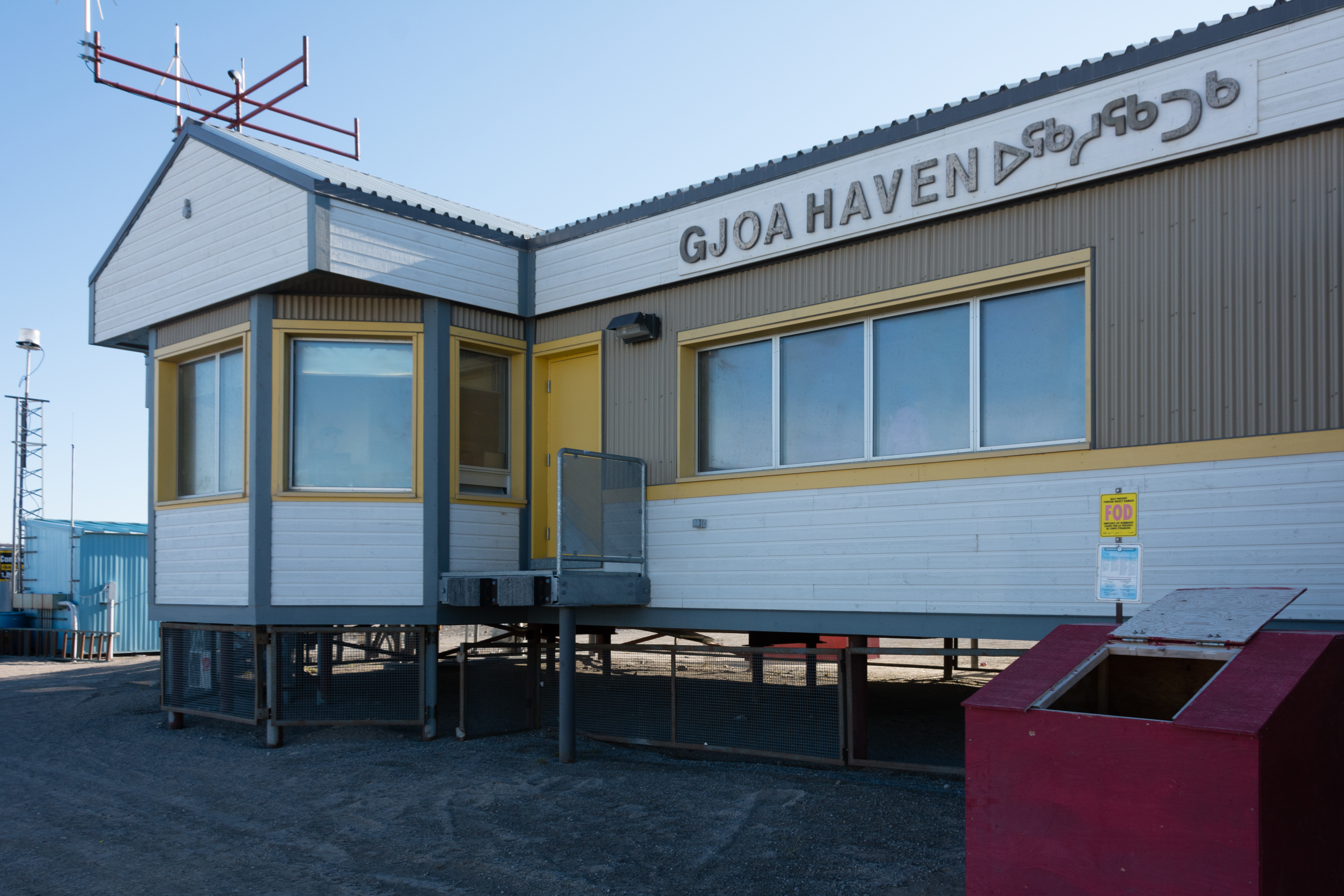
Gjoa Haven Air Terminal (YHK)

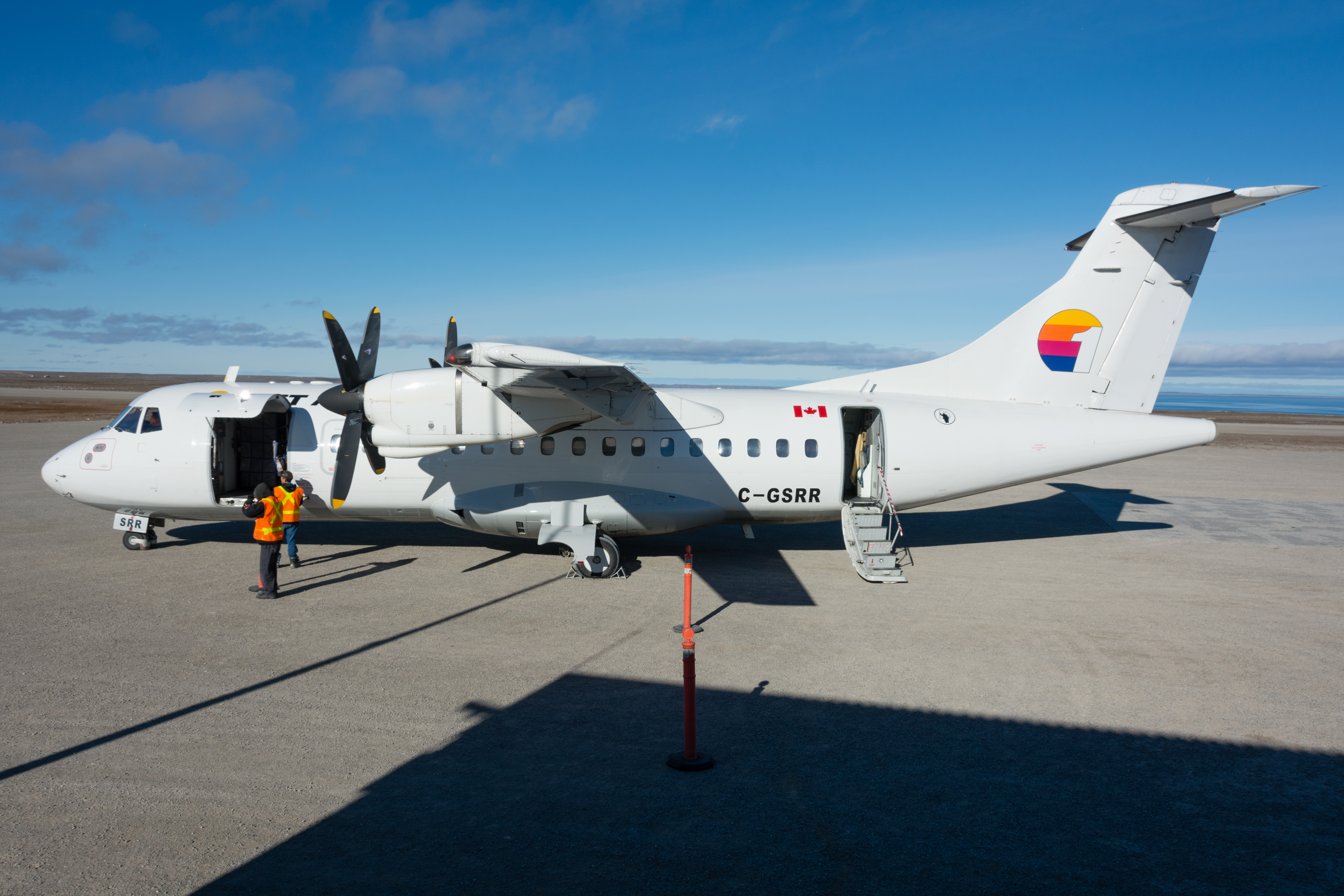
Packed gravel runway at Gjoa Haven Airport (YHK)

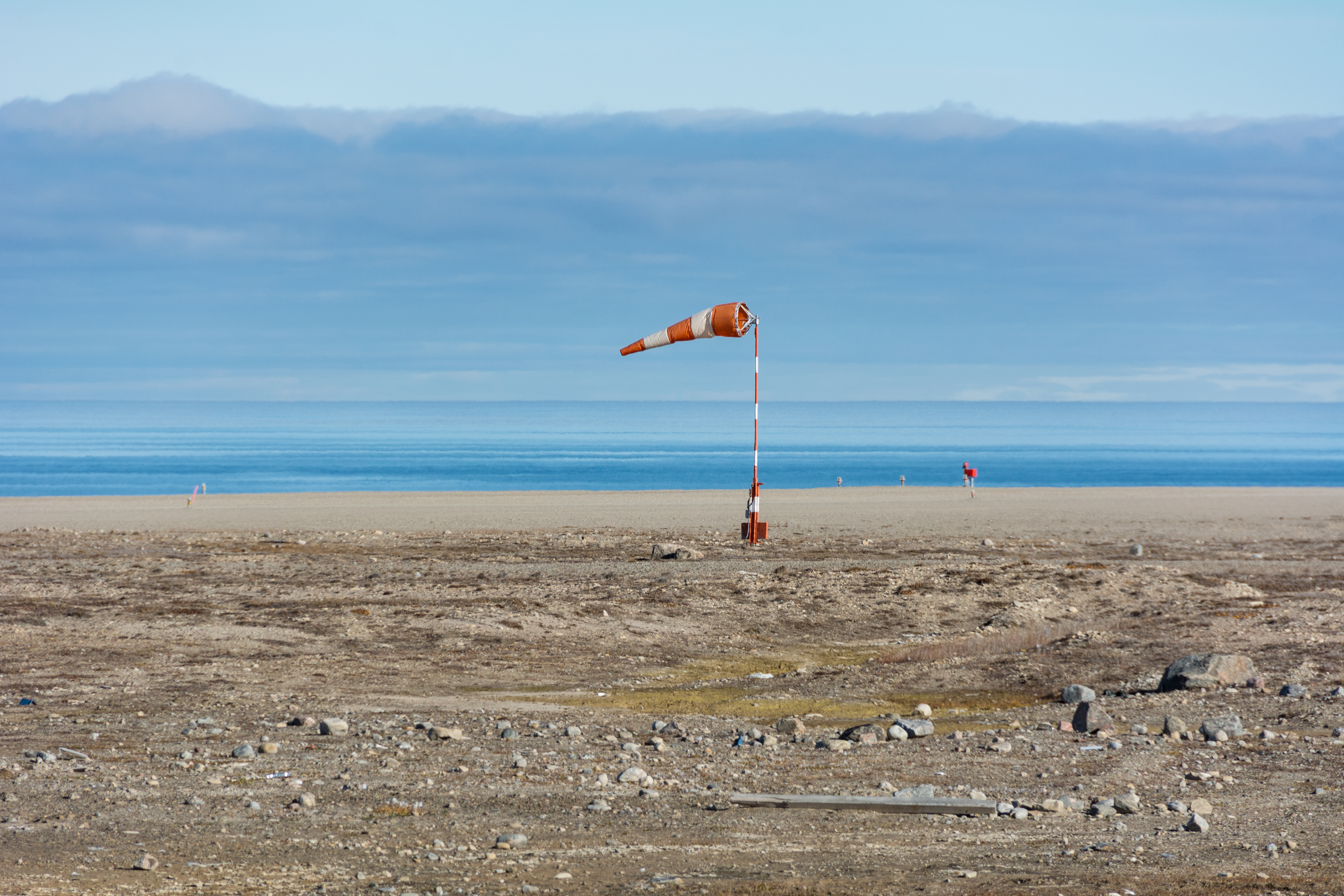
Windsock at Gjoa Haven Airport
