= RV David Thompson =

Parks Canada research and survey vessel

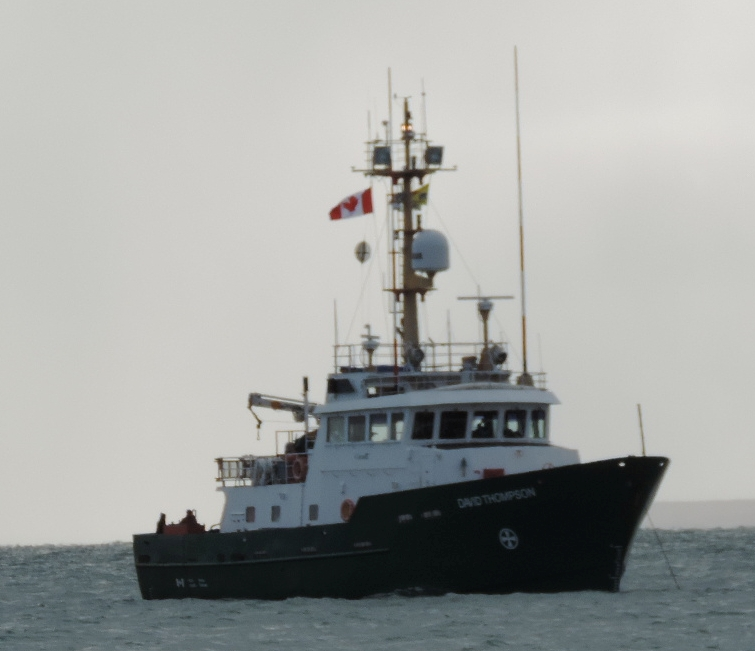
- RV David Thompson, near the wreck of HMS Erebus, 2019

History

Canada
- Name: CCGS Arrow Post
- Operator: Canadian Coast Guard
- Port of registry: Ottawa, Ontario
- Builder: Hike Metal Products, Wheatley, Ontario
- Yard number: 93
- Launched: 1991
- Completed: 1991
- Commissioned: 1992
- Refit: 2012
- Home port: Prince Rupert, British Columbia
- Identification: IMO number: 9065778
- Fate: Transferred to Parks Canada July 2016

Canada
- Name: David Thompson
- Namesake: David Thompson
- Operator: Parks Canada
- Port of registry: Ottawa, Ontario
- Acquired: July 2016
- In service: 2017
- Identification: IMO number: 9065778
- Status: In service

General characteristics
- Type: Research vessel
- Tonnage: 228.3 GT; 228 NT
- Length: 29.0 m (95 ft 2 in)
- Beam: 8.8 m (28 ft 10 in)
- Draught: 3.4 m (11 ft 2 in)
- Installed power: 954 kW (1,279 hp)
- Propulsion: 1 × Caterpillar 3512 geared diesel engines; 1 × controllable pitch propeller, bow thruster
- Speed: 13 knots (24 km/h; 15 mph)
- Range: 2,800 nmi (5,186 km; 3,222 mi) at 10 knots (19 km/h; 12 mph)
- Endurance: 28 days
- Boats & landing craft carried: 2
- Complement: 6
- Sensors & processing systems: Sperry Marine Bridgemaster E X Band; Sperry Marine Bridgemaster II X-band; 1 x Skipper GDS 101; 1 x Furuno FCV-1100; 1 x Wesmar HD 600E sonar

RV David Thompson is a Parks Canada mid-shore scientific research and survey vessel, that entered service in 2016. It is named after David Thompson, the pioneering explorer and surveyor of Canada. RV David Thompson has been used to carry out underwater archaeology work with Parks Canada during the survey of HMS Erebus and HMS Terror, the two Franklin Expedition ships lost in Northern Canadian waters. The vessel was formerly a fisheries patrol vessel of the Canadian Coast Guard named CCGS Arrow Post. (Note: CCGS stands for Canadian Coast Guard Ship)

== Description ==
David Thompson is of steel construction and is 29.0 metres (95 ft 2 in) long overall and 26.5 metres (86 ft 11 in) between perpendiculars with a beam of 8.8 metres (28 ft 10 in) and a draught of 3.4 metres (11 ft 2 in). The ship is powered by one Caterpillar 3512 geared diesel engine rated at 954 kilowatts (1,279 hp) driving a single controllable pitch propeller and a bow thruster. This gives the ship a maximum speed of 13 knots (24 km/h; 15 mph). The ship has a fuel capacity of 52.6 m^{3} (11,600 imp gal) giving the ship a range of 2,800 nautical miles (5,200 km; 3,200 mi) at 10 knots (19 km/h; 12 mph) and an endurance of 28 days. The ship is also equipped with two Caterpillar 3306 generators and one Caterpillar 3406 emergency generator.

David Thompson is equipped with two rigid-hulled inflatable boats and has one HIAB seacrane capable of lifting 1.3 t (1.3 long tons; 1.4 short tons). The ship has a complement of six, and while with the Canadian Coast Guard operated with three officer and three crew. David Thompson has six berths.

== Service history ==
Arrow Post was ordered by the Canadian Coast Guard from Hike Metal Products for construction at their yard in Wheatley, Ontario with the yard number 93. The ship was launched and completed in 1991. The ship was commissioned in 1992. The ship was based in Prince Rupert in British Columbia and registered in Ottawa, Ontario. In Coast Guard service, Arrow Post was primarily used for fisheries patrol. However, the ship was also used to carry out scientific research.

Arrow Post was refit in 2012 by Allied Shipbuilders. In October 2014, Arrow Post was one of the Coast Guard vessels used to monitor the disabled Russian merchant vessel Simishur after it lost power off Haida Gwaii in British Columbia. The vessel was later taken under tow by CCGS Gordon Reid.

In 2016, Arrow Post was transferred from the Canadian Coast Guard to Parks Canada. The vessel was refitted as a research vessel by Canadian Maritime Engineering of Nanaimo, British Columbia beginning in April 2017. In June 2017, the ship was used for a marine archeology expedition at the underwater wreck site of HMS Terror in the Arctic. The vessel returned with divers for archaeological expeditions to the wreck of HMS Erebus in 2018 and HMS Terror in 2019.
