= Erebus (crater) =

Crater on Mars

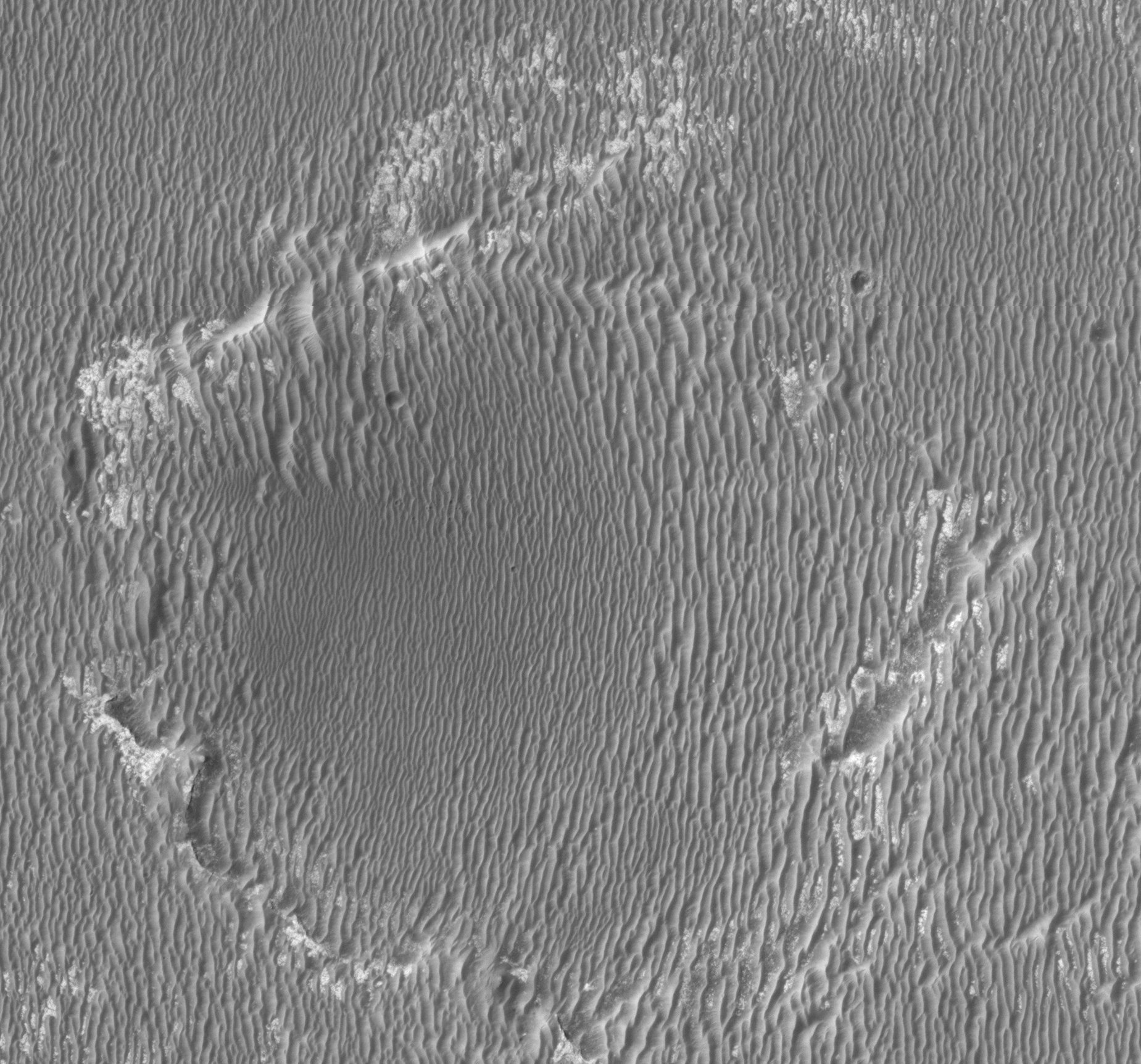
- Planet: Mars
- Region: Meridiani Planum
- Coordinates: 2.1°S 5.5°W
- Quadrangle: Margaritifer Sinus
- Diameter: ~350 metres
- Depth: Effectively zero depth
- Discoverer: Opportunity rover
- Eponym: HMS Erebus

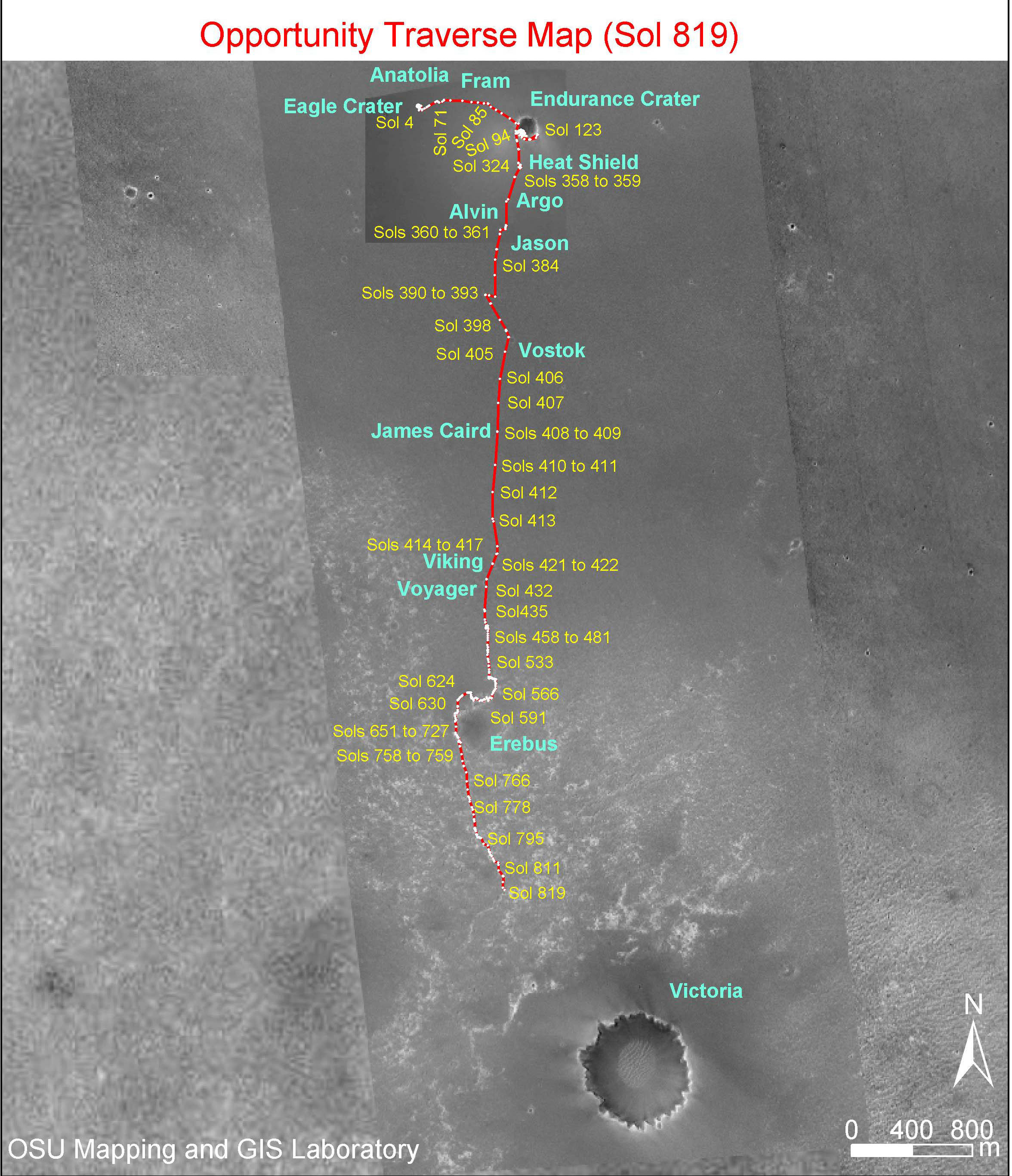
Erebus is located near the center of this satellite image.

Erebus is a crater lying situated within the Margaritifer Sinus quadrangle (MC-19) region of the planet Mars, this extraterrestrial geological feature was visited by the Opportunity rover on the way to the much larger crater Victoria. It is named after the polar exploration vessel HMS Erebus which was used by James Clark Ross in 1841 to discover the Great Ice Barrier, now known as the Ross Ice Shelf. The rover was in the immediate vicinity of the crater from approximately sol 550 to 750 (October 2005 to March 2006).

This crater features two other minor named outcrops on the edges of this topographical depression. These include Payson Ridge and Olympia Ridge (see gallery below).

Erebus is located roughly 2,500 metres (8,200 ft) south of the much smaller crater Vostok, which was previously visited by Opportunity. It is located within a type of terrain that a team of scientists led by J. M. Metz described as "etched terrain". The etched terrain is characterized by heavily eroded rocks that form polygonal structures separated by ridges and valleys.

Erebus is about 350 metres (1,150 ft) wide, twice as large as the crater Endurance. However, it is very old and eroded, and is barely visible from the ground; it appears merely as a number of flat rocky outcrops encircling a region of dunes.

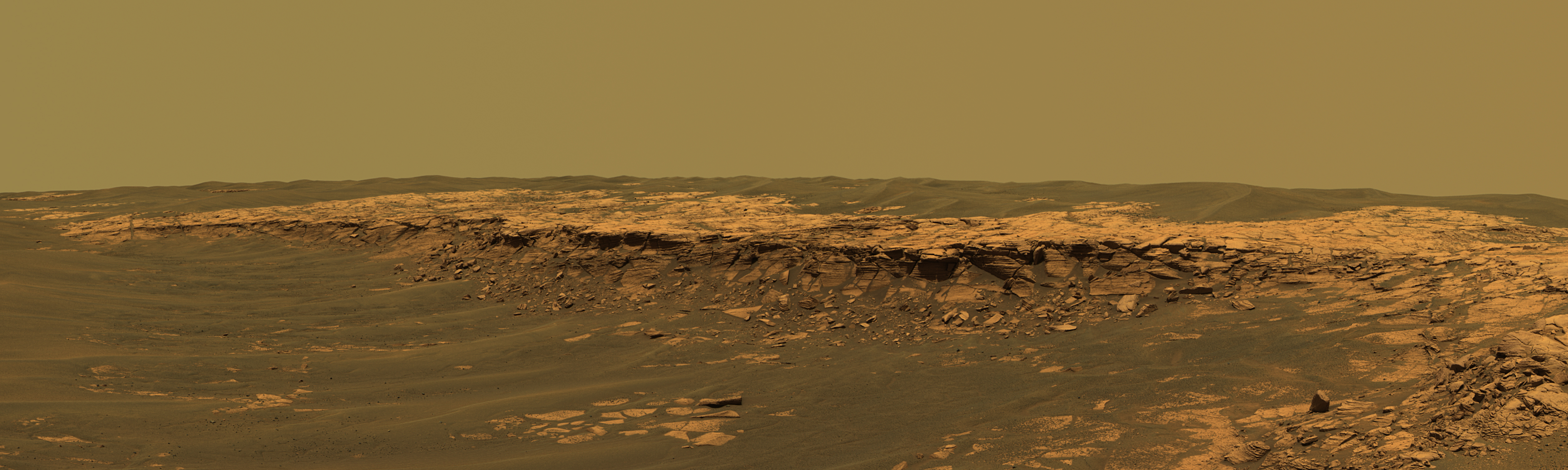
An outcrop named "Payson", on the western edge of Erebus.

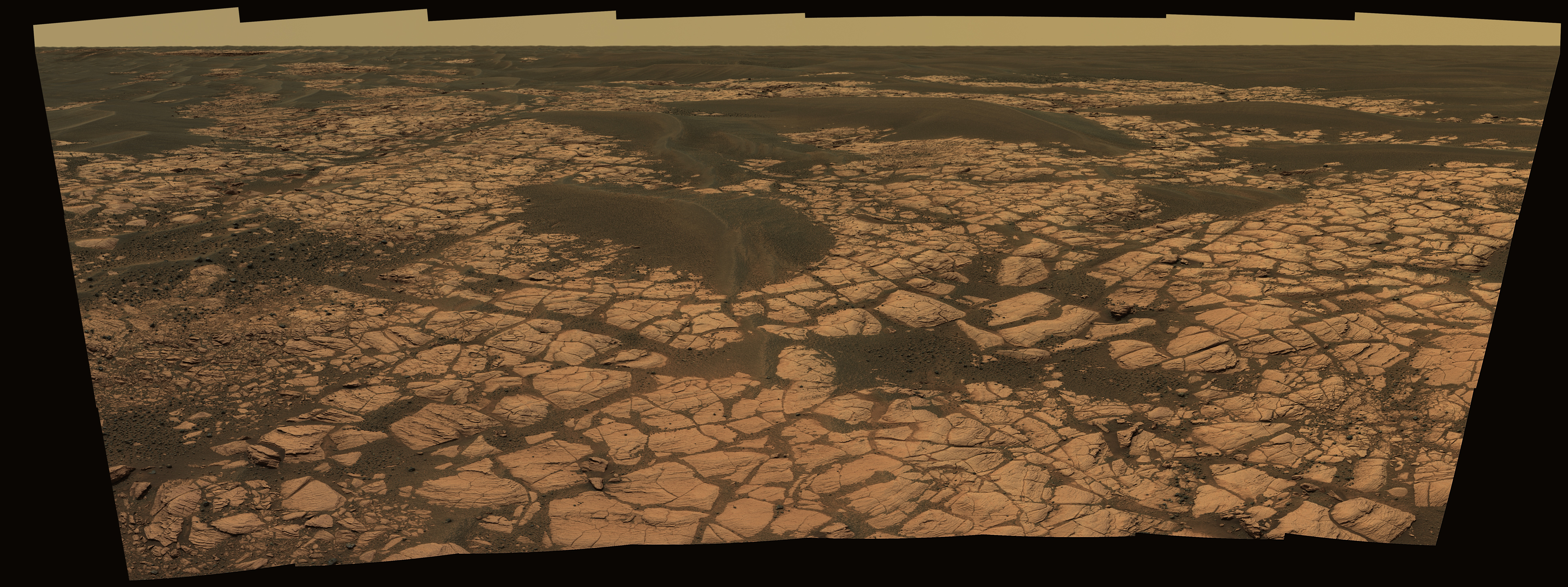
"Olympia" outcrop on northwestern margin of Erebus

Color panorama taken by Opportunity on the rim of Erebus. The crater itself can be seen in the center of the pan, at the top.

== See also ==
- Geography of Mars
- List of craters on Mars

== External links and further reading ==
- NASA Astronomy Picture of the Day: from Nov 8 2005 on Erebus and Opportunity Rover (8 November 2005)
- Grotzinger; Bell, J.; Herkenhoff, K.; Johnson, J.; Knoll, A.; McCartney, E.; McLennan, S.; Metz, J.; et al. (2006). "Sedimentary textures formed by aqueous processes, Erebus crater, Meridiani Planum, Mars". Geology. 34 (12): 1085–1088. Bibcode:2006Geo....34.1085G. doi:10.1130/G22985A.1.
- Structure and Sedimentology of the Western Margin of Erebus Crater, Meridiani Planum, Mars
- Erebrus and Victoria by Mars Express HRSC + SRC
