= Wilmot and Crampton Bay =

Bay in Nunavut, Canada

- Location in Nunavut
- Location: Adelaide Peninsula
- Coordinates: 68°11′N 98°45′W
- Ocean/sea sources: Arctic Ocean
- Basin countries: Canada

Wilmot and Crampton Bay is an Arctic waterway in the Kitikmeot Region, Nunavut, Canada . It is located on the eastern edge of Queen Maud Gulf, running along the western coast of the Adelaide Peninsula, south of King William Island.

On 2 September 2014, the wreck of HMS Erebus, the flagship of the lost expedition of Sir John Franklin, was found in Wilmot and Crampton Bay by a Parks Canada underwater archaeological team. Following Erebus' rediscovery, the Nunavut Field Unit of Parks Canada restricted access to a rectangular area of the bay, west of the peninsula and about 25 km (16 mi) northeast of O'Reilly Island, as part of the Wrecks of HMS Erebus and HMS Terror National Historic Site. The area runs from Point A (68°14′44.8″N 98°52′22.3″W) to Point B (68°17′44.2″N 98°40′17.9″W) to Point C (68°13′15.4″N 98°32′16.2″W) to Point D (68°10′16.5″N 98°44′19.3″W).
