= Gjoa Haven =

Settlement on King William Island

Gjoa Haven ᐅᖅᓱᖅᑑᖅ Uqsuqtuuq
- Hamlet
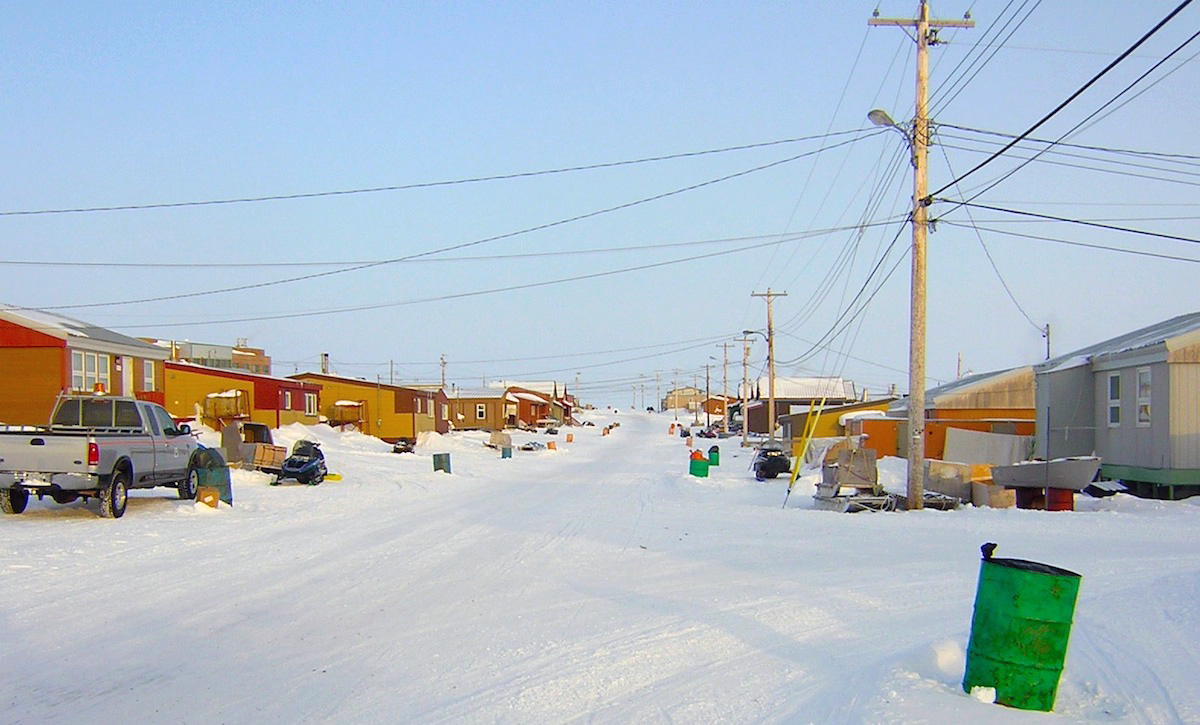
- Main street of Gjoa Haven

- Location within Nunavut Location within Canada
- Coordinates: 68°37′30″N 95°52′40″W
- Country: Canada
- Territory: Nunavut
- Region: Kitikmeot
- Electoral district: Gjoa Haven

Government
  - Mayor: Megan Porter
  - MLA: David Porter
  - MP: Lori Idlout

Area (2021)
  - Total: 28.55 km^{2} (11.02 sq mi)
  - Population Centre: 0.70 km^{2} (0.27 sq mi)
- Elevation: 47 m (154 ft)

Population (2021)
  - Total: 1,349
  - Density: 47.3/km^{2} (123/sq mi)
  - Population Centre: 1,110
  - Population Centre density: 1,586.2/km^{2} (4,108/sq mi)
- Time zone: UTC−07:00 (MST)
  - Summer (DST): UTC−06:00 (MDT)
- Canadian Postal code: X0B 1J0
- Area code: 867
- Website: www.gjoahaven.net

Gjoa Haven (/ˌdʒoʊ ˈheɪvən/; Inuktitut: Uqsuqtuuq, syllabics: ᐅᖅᓱᖅᑑᖅ Inuktitut pronunciation: [uq.suq.tuːq], meaning "lots of fat", referring to the abundance of sea mammals in the nearby waters; French pronunciation: [ɡʒɔa avɑ̃] or [ɡʒɔa evən]), the only settlement on King William Island, is an Inuit hamlet in Nunavut, above the Arctic Circle.

Located in the Kitikmeot Region, 1,093 km (679 mi) northeast of Yellowknife, Northwest Territories and 1,330 km (830 mi) northwest of Nunavut's capital, Iqaluit.

== Etymology ==
The name Gjoa Haven is from the Norwegian Gjøahavn or "Gjøa's Harbour"; it was named by early 20th-century polar explorer Roald Amundsen after his ship Gjøa.

== History ==
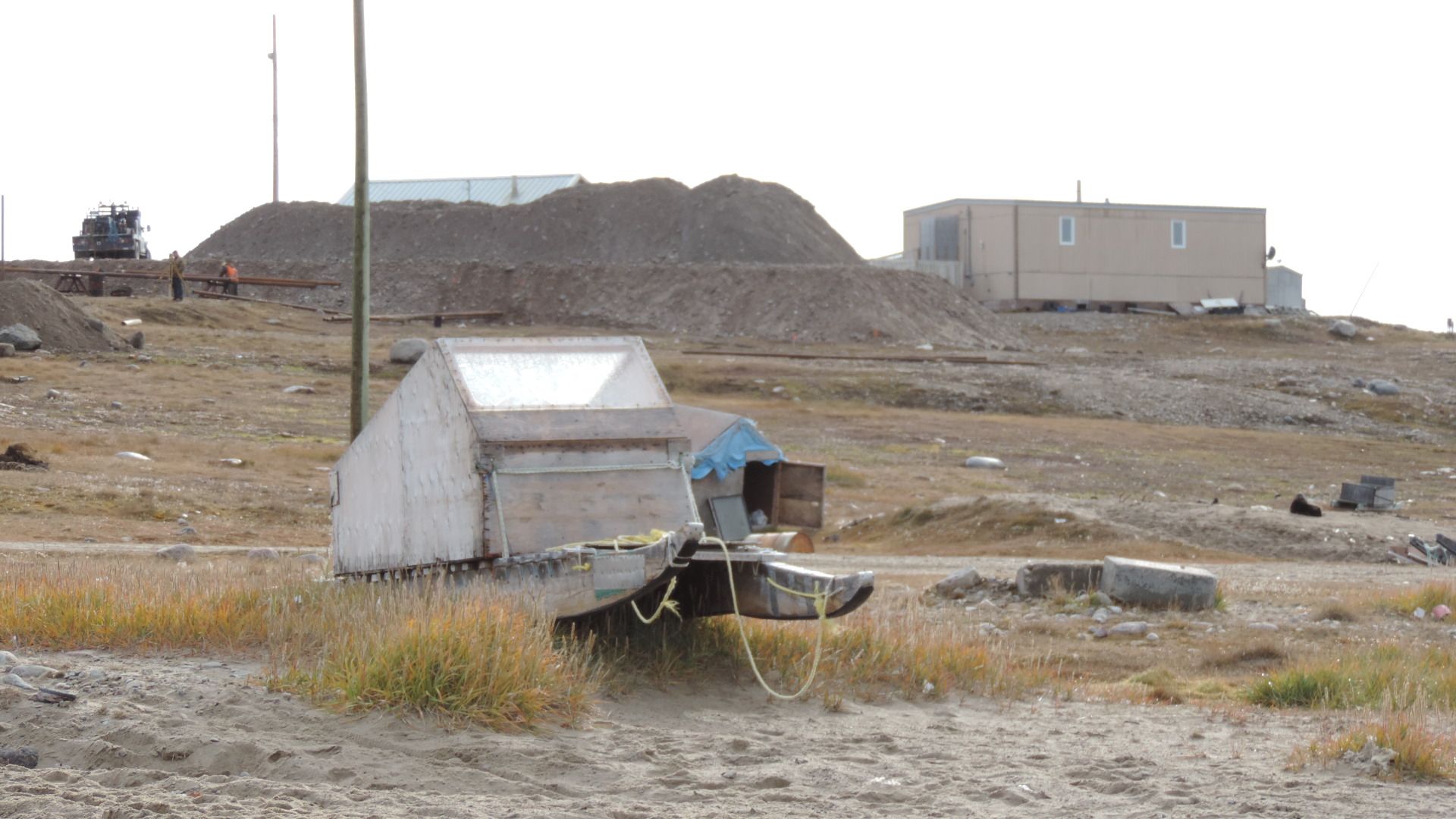
Sled on the beach, September 2019

In 1903, the Norwegian explorer Roald Amundsen had entered the area on his ship Gjøa in an expedition intending to travel through the Northwest Passage. By October the straits through which he was travelling began to ice up. Amundsen put Gjøa into a natural harbour on the southeast coast of King William Island. He stayed there, in what Amundsen called "the finest little harbor in the world", for nearly two years. He and his crew spent much of that time with the local Netsilik, learning from them the skills to live off the land and travel efficiently in the Arctic environment. This knowledge proved to be vital for Amundsen's later successful exploration to the South Pole. He explored the Boothia Peninsula, searching for the exact location of the north magnetic pole.

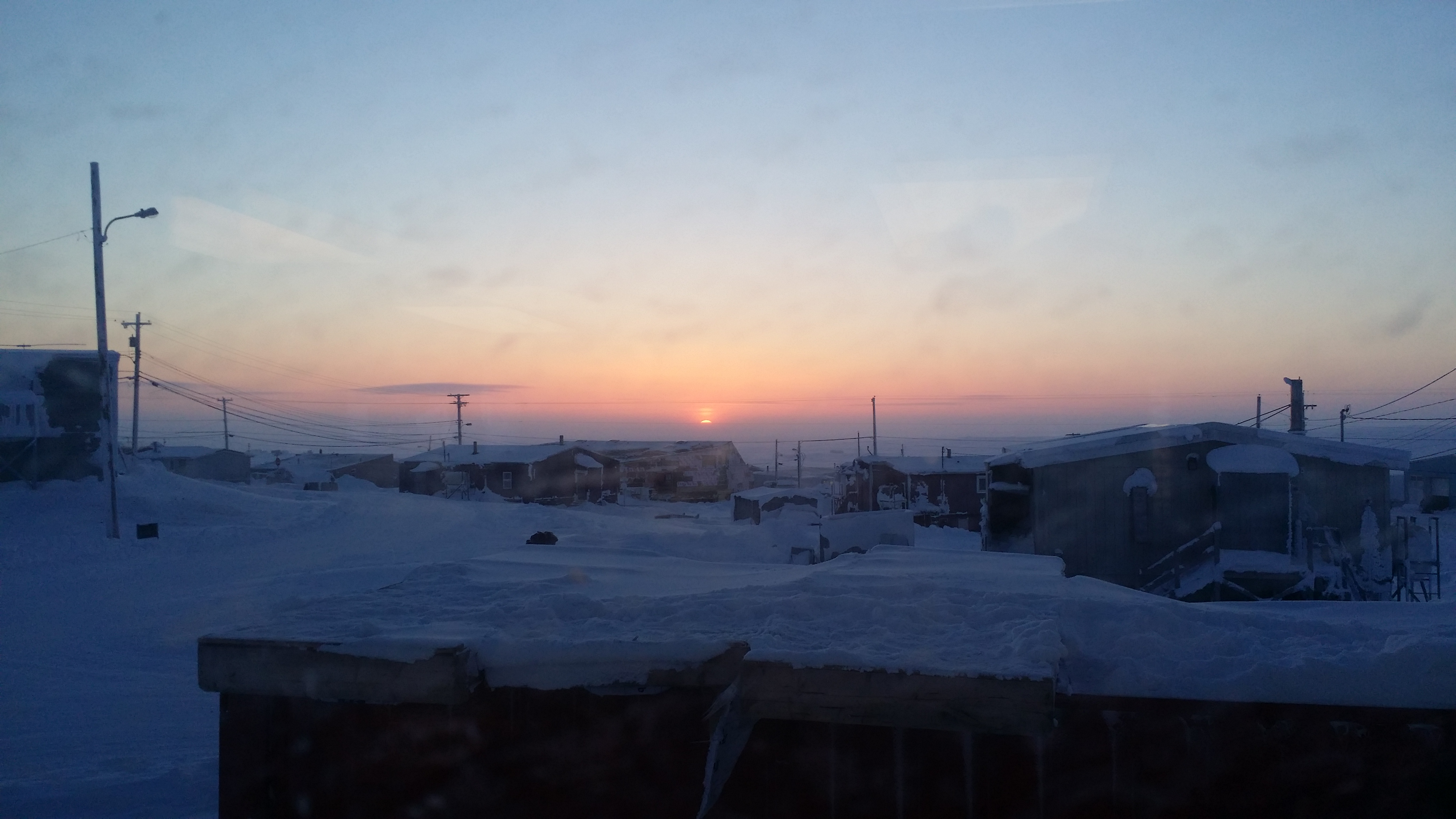
Sunset over the horizon, March 2016

Some Inuit in Gjoa Haven with European ancestry have claimed to be descendants of Amundsen (or one of his six crew, whose names have not remained as well known). Accounts by members of the expedition told of their relations with Inuit women, and historians have speculated that Amundsen might also have taken a partner, although he wrote a warning against this. Specifically, half brothers Bob Konona and Paul Ikuallaq say that their father Luke Ikuallaq (b. 1904) told them on his deathbed that he was the son of Amundsen. Konona said that their father Ikuallaq was left out on the ice to die after his birth, as his European ancestry made him illegitimate to the Inuit, threatening their community. His Inuit grandparents saved him. In 2012, Y-DNA analysis, with the families' permission, showed that Ikuallaq (and his sons) was not a match to the direct male line of Amundsen. Not all descendants claiming European ancestry have been tested for a match to Amundsen, nor has there been a comparison of Ikuallaq's DNA to that of other European members of Amundsen's crew.

Permanent European-style settlement at Gjoa Haven started in 1927 when the Hudson's Bay Company opened a trading post. In 1941 Henry Larsen reached the post from the west. The settlement has attracted the traditionally nomadic Inuit as they have adapted a more settled lifestyle.

In 1961, the town's population was 110. By 2001, the population was 960 according to the census, as most Inuit have moved from their traditional camps to be close to the healthcare and educational facilities available at Gjoa Haven.

Gjoa Haven has expanded to such an extent that a newer subdivision has been developed near the airport at 68°37′56″N 095°52′04″W.

The community is served by the Gjoa Haven Airport and by annual supply sealift. The area is home to CAM-CB, a North Warning System site.

== Demographics ==
Federal census population history of Gjoa Haven
Year	Pop.	±%
1976	420	—
1981	523	+24.5%
1986	650	+24.3%
1991	783	+20.5%
1996	879	+12.3%
2001	960	+9.2%
2006	1,064	+10.8%
2011	1,279	+20.2%
2016	1,324	+3.5%
2021	1,349	+1.9%
Source: Statistics Canada

In the 2021 Canadian census conducted by Statistics Canada, Gjoa Haven had a population of 1,349 living in 292 of its 339 total private dwellings, a change of 1.9% from its 2016 population of 1,324. With a land area of 28.55 km^{2} (11.02 sq mi), it had a population density of 47.3/km^{2} (122.4/sq mi) in 2021. The median age of the community was 23.0 with 22.0 for men and 23.8 for women. The average age was 26.5 with 26.4 for men and 26.6 for women.

In the 2021 Canadian census, Gjoa Haven's Population Centre recorded 1,110 people living in an area of 0.70 km^{2} (0.27 sq mi), giving a population density of 1,585.7/km^{2} (4,107.0/sq mi).

== Landmarks ==
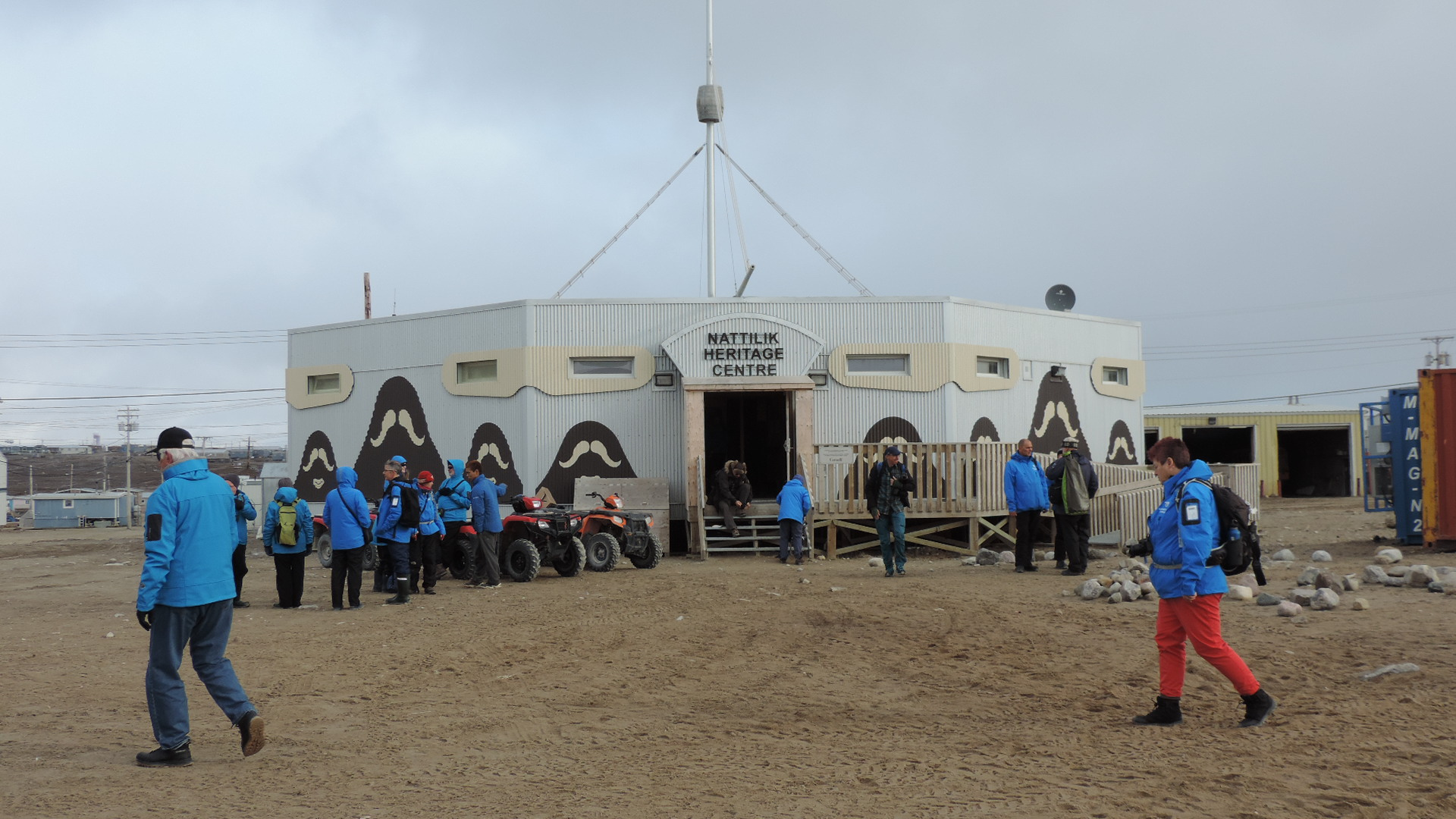
Nattilik Heritage Centre, September 2019

- Nattilik Heritage Centre - a museum and heritage centre, opened on 17 October 2013, with a collection of handmade harpoons, snow goggles and snow knives purchased by Amundsen and repatriated to Canada and to the community from where they first came, after years on display at the Museum of Cultural History, Oslo. There is local art available for purchasing.

The centre was expanded to include the history of the lost expedition of Sir John Franklin. This expansion opened in June 2025.

- Northwest Passage Trail, shows the history of the exploration of the Northwest Passage as it relates to the area

== Religion ==
Two churches are located in the hamlet:

- Immaculate Heart of Mary Roman Catholic Church
- Old Gjoa Haven Church

== Government services ==
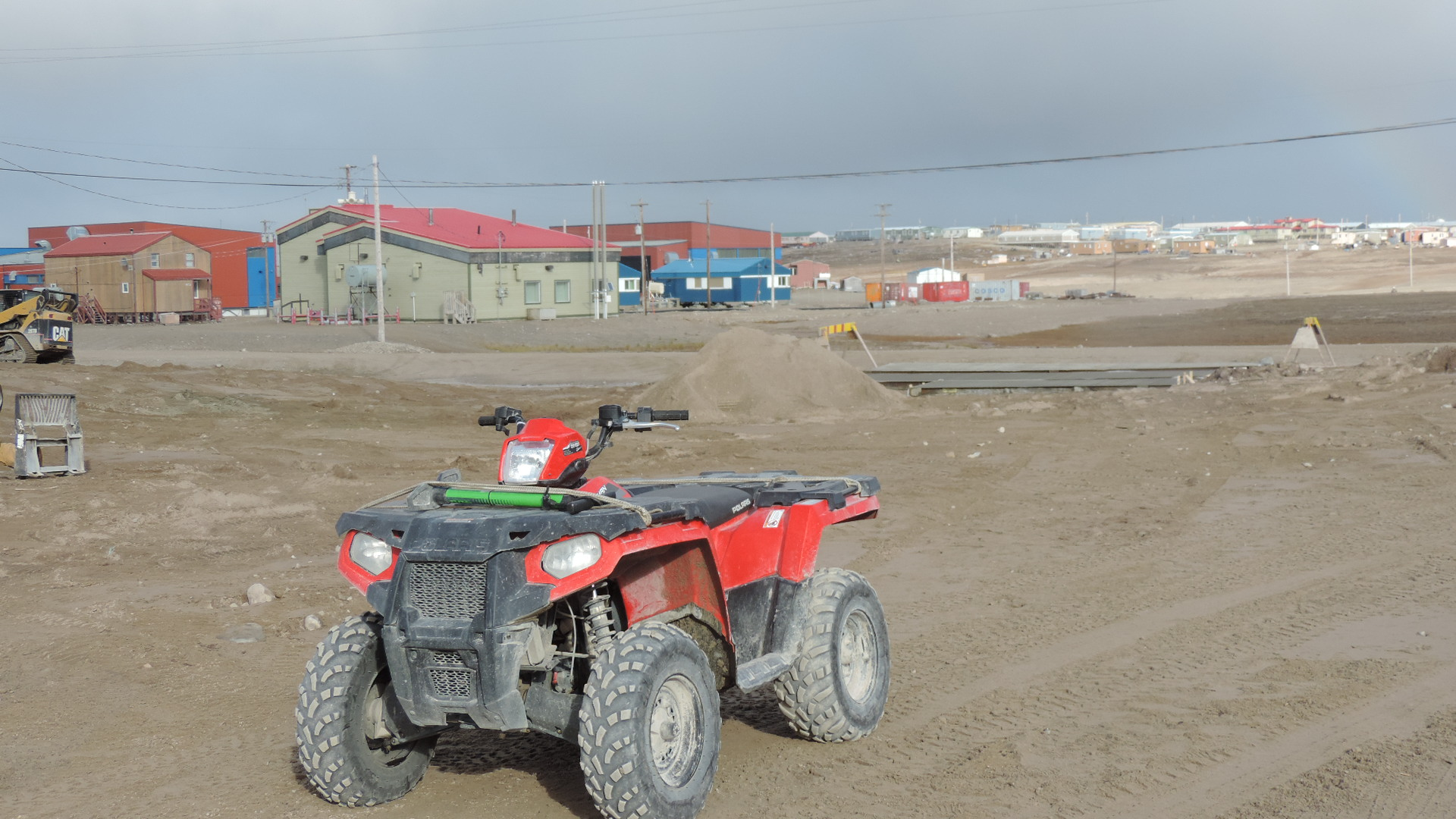
All terrain vehicle (ATV), September 2019

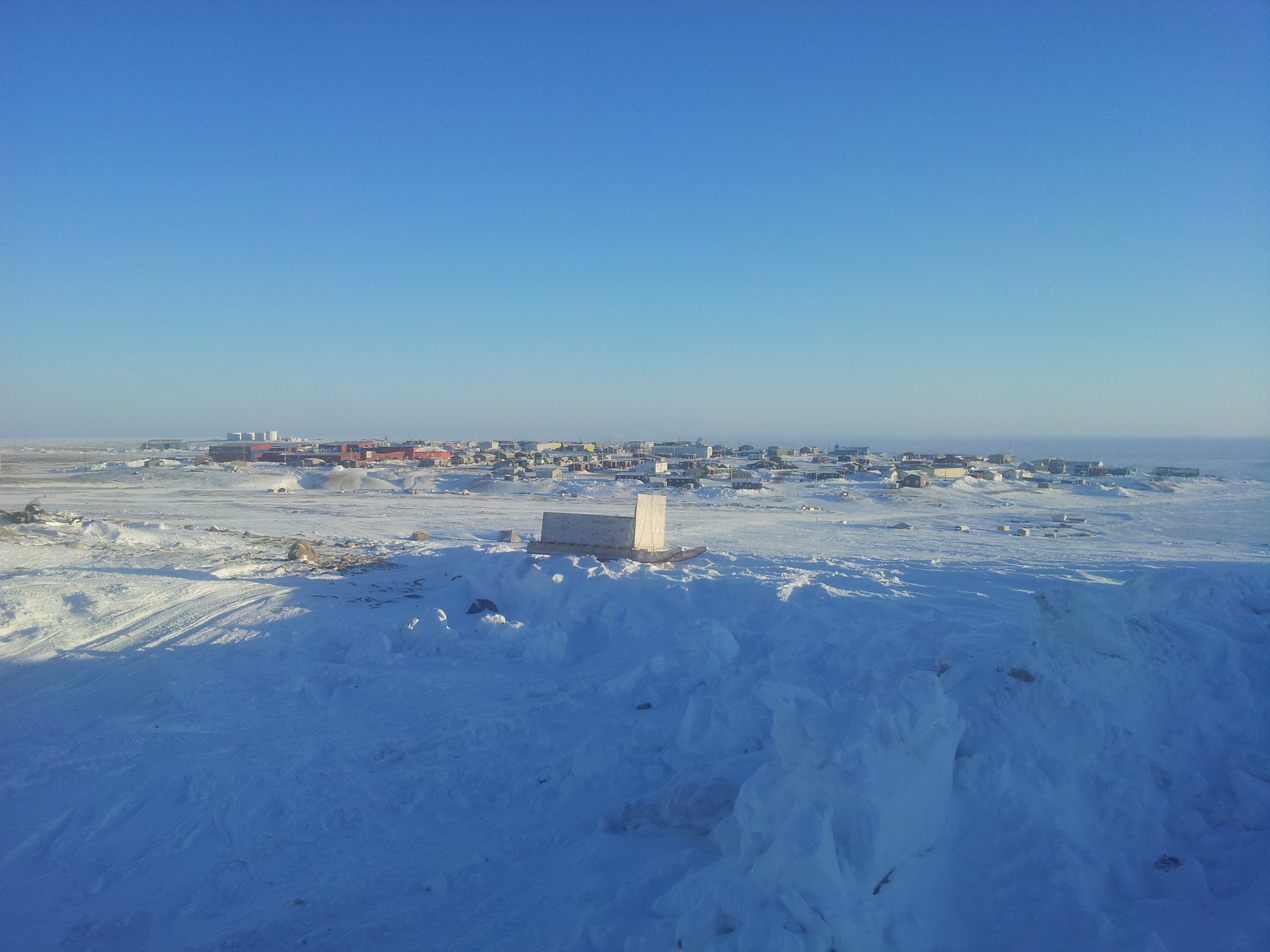
Sled on snow bank overlooking the Hamlet, April 2015

=== Local ===
- Gjoa Haven RCMP Detachment
- Gjoa Haven Fire Department
- Gjoa Haven Hamlet Council
- Gjoa Haven Continuing Care - a 10-bed, 24/7 health care facility opened in 2010

=== Territorial ===
- Gjoa Haven Nunavut Water Board
- Gjoa Haven Lands Administration Office
- Nunavut Social Services Department
- Nunavut Power Corporation
- Nunavut Economic Development Office

== Climate ==
Gjoa Haven has a tundra climate (ET) with short but cool summers and long cold winters.

Climate data for Gjoa Haven (Gjoa Haven Airport) Climate ID: 2302335; coordinates 68°38′08″N 95°51′01″W; elevation: 46.9 m (154 ft); 1991–2020 normals, extremes 1984–present
Month	Jan	Feb	Mar	Apr	May	Jun	Jul	Aug	Sep	Oct	Nov	Dec	Year
Record high humidex	−4.6	−11.3	−6.6	0.2	5.5	19.4	26.7	26.8	16.0	4.2	−0.6	−1.9	26.8
Record high °C (°F)	−4.4 (24.1)	−11.0 (12.2)	−5.0 (23.0)	1.0 (33.8)	6.5 (43.7)	20.8 (69.4)	24.4 (75.9)	24.0 (75.2)	15.4 (59.7)	4.5 (40.1)	−0.5 (31.1)	−2.0 (28.4)	24.4 (75.9)
Mean daily maximum °C (°F)	−29.6 (−21.3)	−30.3 (−22.5)	−25.4 (−13.7)	−15.9 (3.4)	−5.7 (21.7)	4.6 (40.3)	12.4 (54.3)	9.7 (49.5)	2.5 (36.5)	−5.7 (21.7)	−17.2 (1.0)	−24.6 (−12.3)	−10.4 (13.3)
Daily mean °C (°F)	−32.9 (−27.2)	−33.6 (−28.5)	−29.3 (−20.7)	−20.2 (−4.4)	−9.1 (15.6)	1.7 (35.1)	8.4 (47.1)	6.5 (43.7)	0.4 (32.7)	−8.4 (16.9)	−20.7 (−5.3)	−28.0 (−18.4)	−13.8 (7.2)
Mean daily minimum °C (°F)	−36.0 (−32.8)	−36.4 (−33.5)	−32.9 (−27.2)	−24.4 (−11.9)	−12.4 (9.7)	−1.1 (30.0)	4.2 (39.6)	3.3 (37.9)	−1.7 (28.9)	−11.1 (12.0)	−24.2 (−11.6)	−31.4 (−24.5)	−17.0 (1.4)
Record low °C (°F)	−48.3 (−54.9)	−50.2 (−58.4)	−46.3 (−51.3)	−41.1 (−42.0)	−28.2 (−18.8)	−17.0 (1.4)	−1.2 (29.8)	−5.0 (23.0)	−14.3 (6.3)	−32.0 (−25.6)	−39.4 (−38.9)	−44.0 (−47.2)	−50.2 (−58.4)
Record low wind chill	−64.2	−65.3	−66.5	−54.0	−39.4	−21.9	−6.8	−12.9	−21.2	−48.1	−55.0	−62.5	−66.5
Average precipitation mm (inches)	7.9 (0.31)	6.0 (0.24)	12.7 (0.50)	15.4 (0.61)	12.0 (0.47)	15.3 (0.60)	20.9 (0.82)	31.8 (1.25)	25.8 (1.02)	25.6 (1.01)	10.7 (0.42)	8.7 (0.34)	192.7 (7.59)
Average rainfall mm (inches)	0.0 (0.0)	0.0 (0.0)	0.0 (0.0)	0.0 (0.0)	1.3 (0.05)	11.7 (0.46)	19.4 (0.76)	30.4 (1.20)	14.0 (0.55)	1.1 (0.04)	0.0 (0.0)	0.0 (0.0)	34.6 (1.36)
Average snowfall cm (inches)	11.2 (4.4)	9.8 (3.9)	19.8 (7.8)	17.1 (6.7)	15.4 (6.1)	4.6 (1.8)	0.5 (0.2)	0.5 (0.2)	9.8 (3.9)	32.7 (12.9)	14.2 (5.6)	12.2 (4.8)	87.4 (34.4)
Average precipitation days (≥ 0.2 mm)	8.8	6.0	9.7	8.9	8.7	8.6	9.7	12.7	12.9	16.0	11.9	9.7	123.4
Average rainy days (≥ 0.2 mm)	0.0	0.0	0.0	0.0	0.63	5.6	8.8	11.4	7.7	0.53	0.0	0.0	34.7
Average snowy days (≥ 0.2 cm)	8.9	6.3	9.9	9.4	8.7	1.9	0.22	0.53	6.3	15.3	11.2	8.7	87.4
Average relative humidity (%) (at 1500 LST)	69.0	69.1	73.9	81.5	86.2	81.2	70.3	75.5	83.4	88.4	80.2	73.7	77.7
Source: Environment and Climate Change Canada

== Economy ==
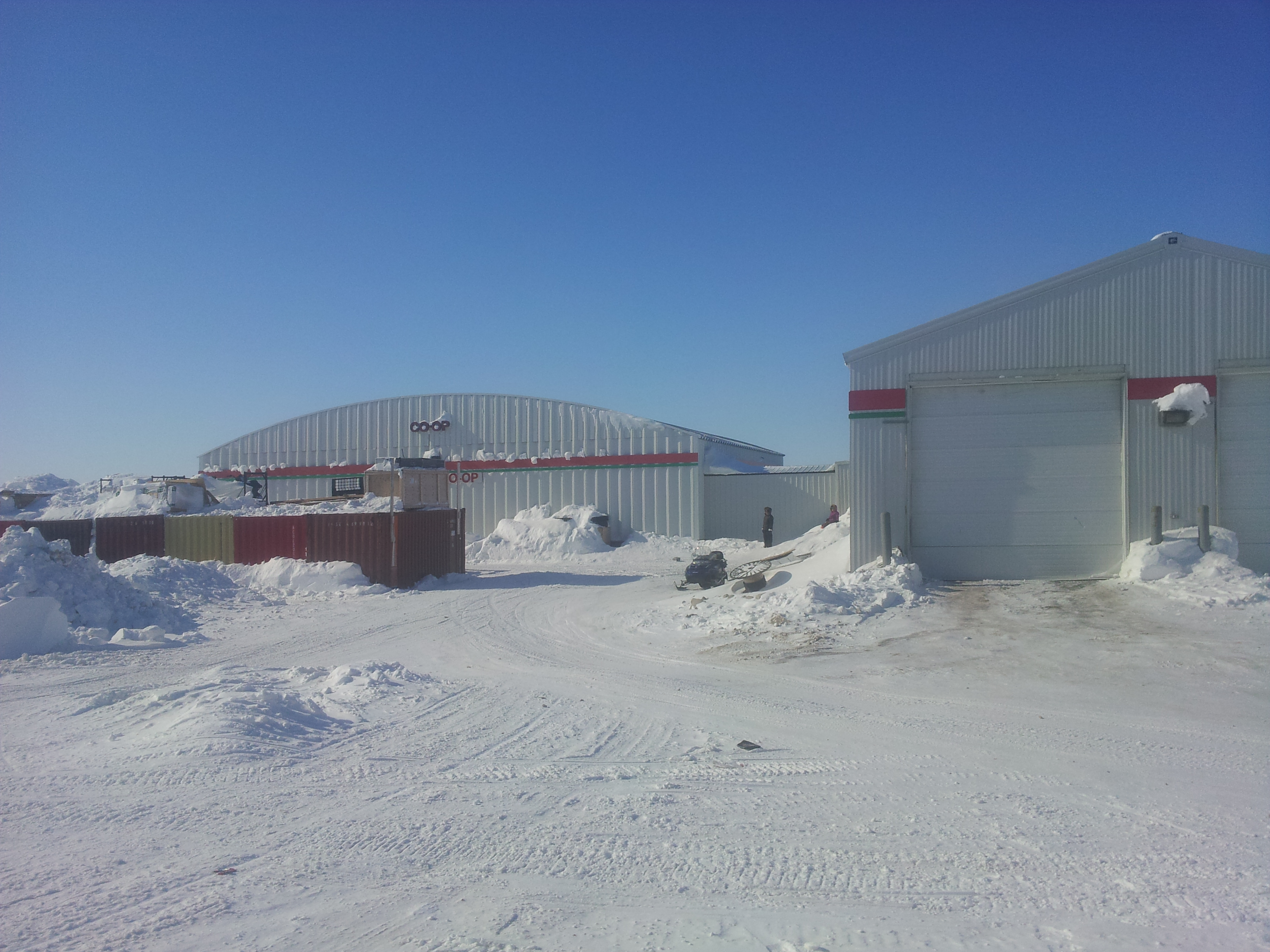
Qikiqtaq Co-Op, April 2015

Most employment in Gjoa Haven is with government services; there are a few commercial employers:

- CAP Enterprises Limited – construction and heavy equipment
- Northern Store – retail store
- The Inns North Amundsen Hotel – 16 rooms in a two-storey structure built in 1995
- Qikiqtaq Co-op Limited – retail store
- Gjoa Haven Community Airport Radio Station – operating from Gjoa Haven Airport

=== Wrecks of HMS Erebus and HMS Terror National Historic Site ===
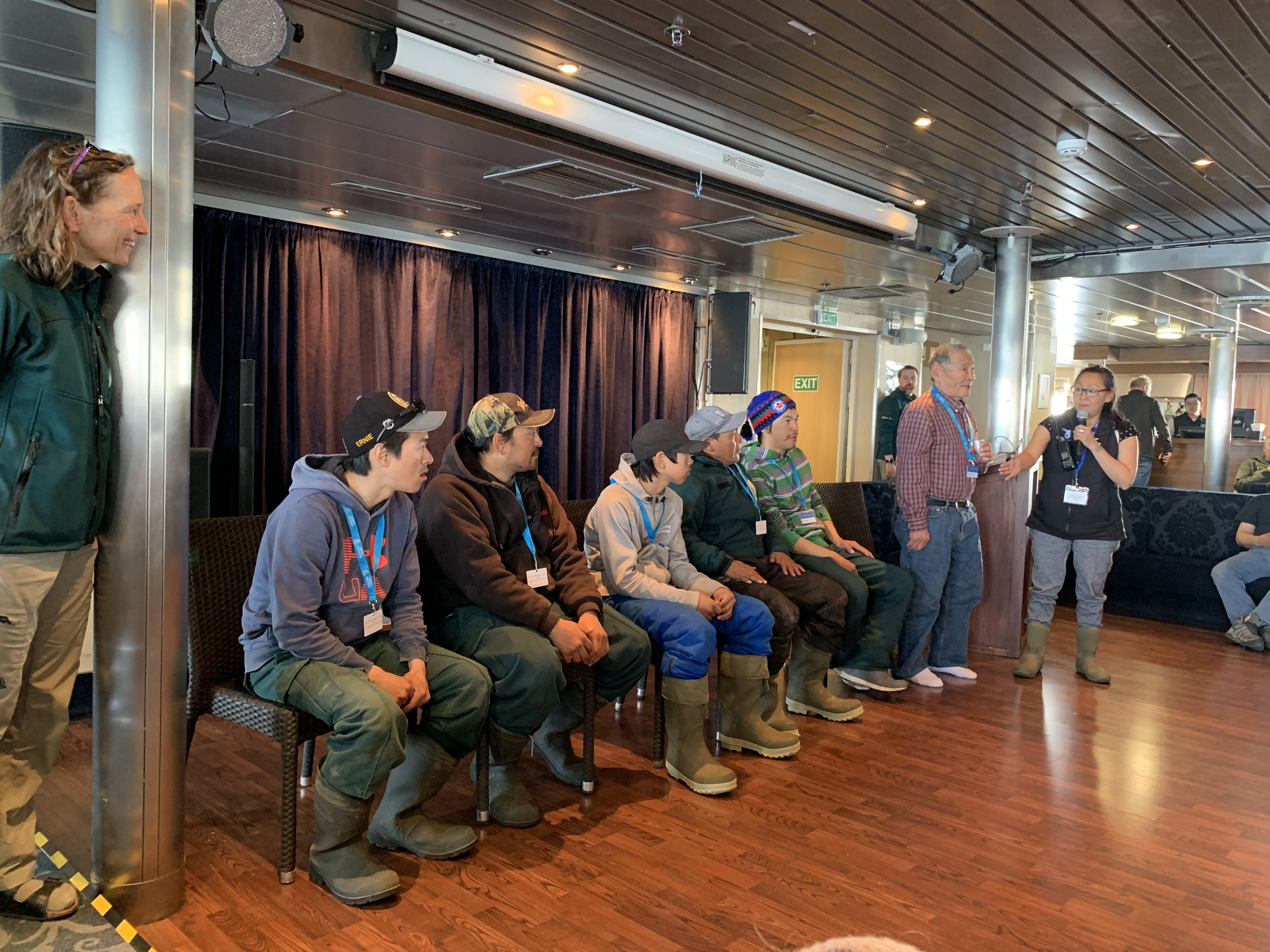
Inuit guardians from Gjoa Haven on MS Ocean Endeavour as part of the trial visitor experience to the Wrecks of HMS Erebus and HMS Terror National Historic Site, 2019

The discovery of HMS Terror and HMS Erebus shipwrecks from the Franklin's lost expedition is expected to bring increased tourism to Gjoa Haven, the nearest community to the Wrecks of HMS Erebus and HMS Terror National Historic Site. Public access to the site is not allowed. To protect the site, Inuit from Gjoa Haven are employed as guardians, camping near the wreck sites to monitor access to the sites. The Nattilik Heritage Centre will be expanded to create a visitor centre for the historic site.

== Education ==
Gjoa Haven has three schools:

- Quqshuun Ilihakvik Elementary School
- Qiqirtaq Ilihakvik High School
- Nunavut Arctic College

== Broadband communications ==
The community has been served by the Qiniq network since 2005. Qiniq is a fixed wireless service to homes and businesses, connecting to the outside world via a satellite backbone. The Qiniq network is designed and operated by SSi Canada. In 2017, the network was upgraded to 4G LTE technology, and 2G-GSM for mobile voice.

== Culture ==
Moon Dance team performing square dancing at the Gjoa Haven community hall, 2019

Square dancing is very popular in Gjoa Haven with many teams competing in annual showdowns (square dance tournaments). Inuit learned square dancing from the Scottish and American whalers active in the area in the mid-1800s. It is generally accompanied by accordion (or concertina) and fiddles and has its roots in round dances from Great Britain rather than Western American square dance. A single dance can take from 40 minutes to over an hour.

== Notable people ==
- Leona Aglukkaq, politician, first Inuk to be appointed to the Cabinet of Canada.
- Tony Akoak, territorial politician
- Michael Angottitauruq, territorial politician
- Uriash Puqiqnak, soapstone carver and territorial politician
- Simon Tookoome, author

== See also ==
- List of municipalities in Nunavut
