= Nattilik Heritage Centre =

Museum in Nunavut, Canada

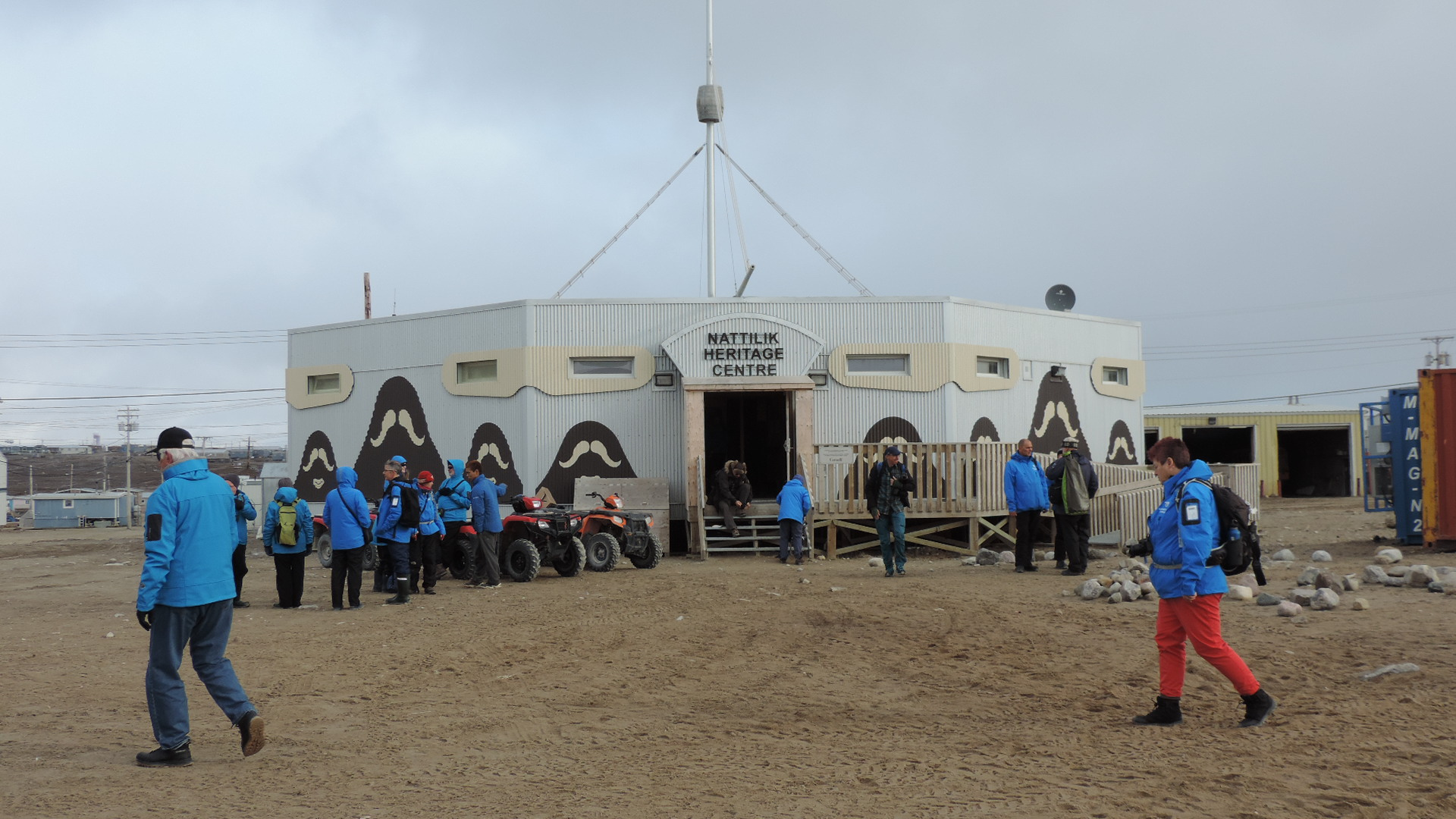
- Established: 17 October 2013; 12 years ago
- Location: Gjoa Haven, Nunavut, Canada
- Coordinates: 68.6239°N 95.8715°W
- Owner: Nattilik Heritage Society

Nattilik Heritage Centre is a museum in Gjoa Haven, King William Island, Nunavut, Canada. It presents the history and culture of the local Inuit as well as Franklin's lost expedition. The centre initially opened in late 2013, while the expansion opened in June 2025.

== Franklin's lost expedition ==
As the nearest Inuit settlement to the Wrecks of HMS Erebus and HMS Terror National Historic Site, the Natiilik Heritage Centre was expanded to include the history of the lost expedition of Sir John Franklin, as well as artefacts from the wrecks of the expedition's ships HMS Erebus and HMS Terror. This was done under an Inuit Impact and Benefit Agreement based on the Nunavut Land Claims Agreement with the Inuit to give them the ownership of archaeological sites and artifacts within Nunavut's boundaries. Ironically the heritage centre was opened on the birthday of Captain Francis Crozier, commander of HMS Terror, on 17 October.

== Gallery ==
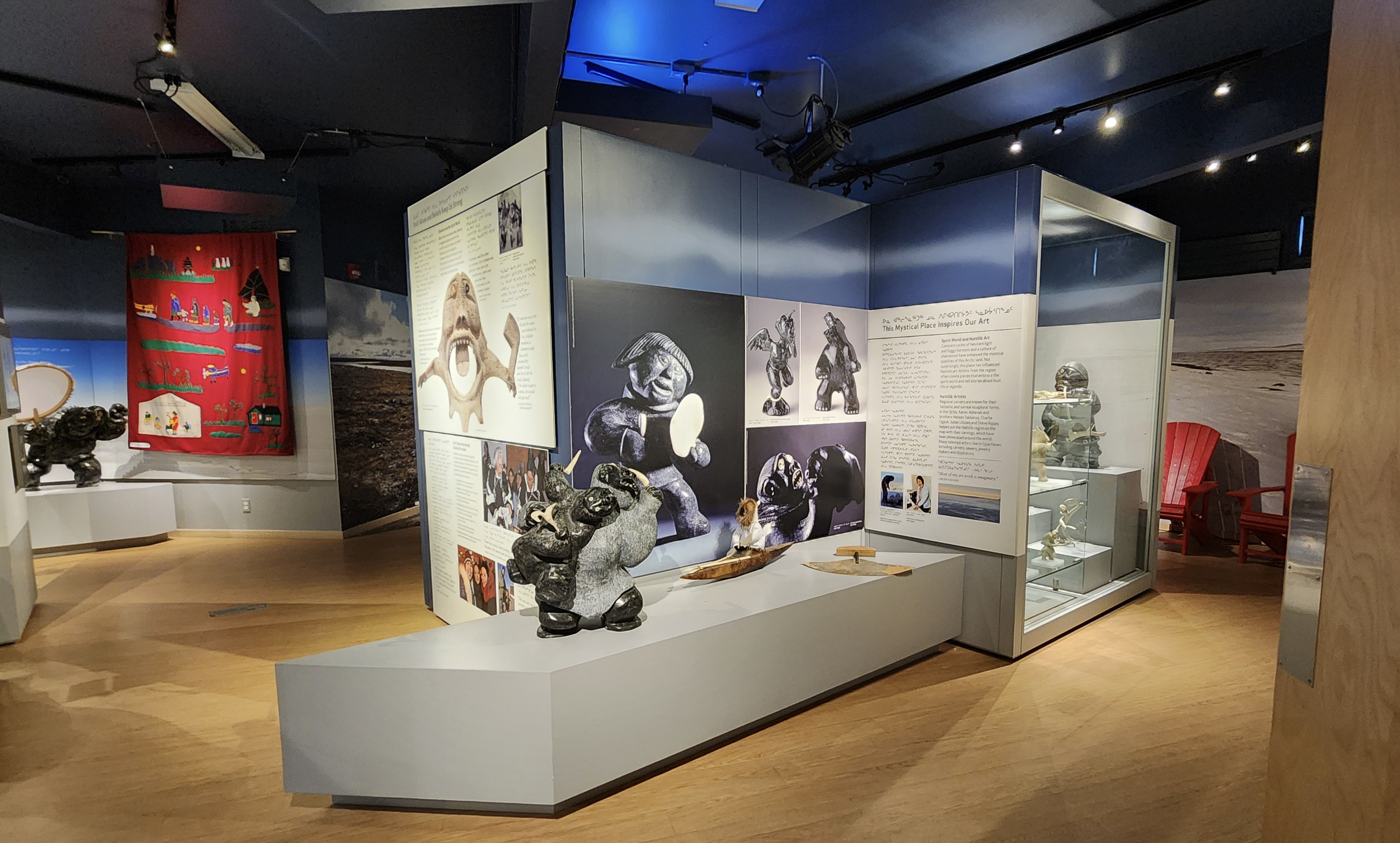
History and culture of the local Inuit

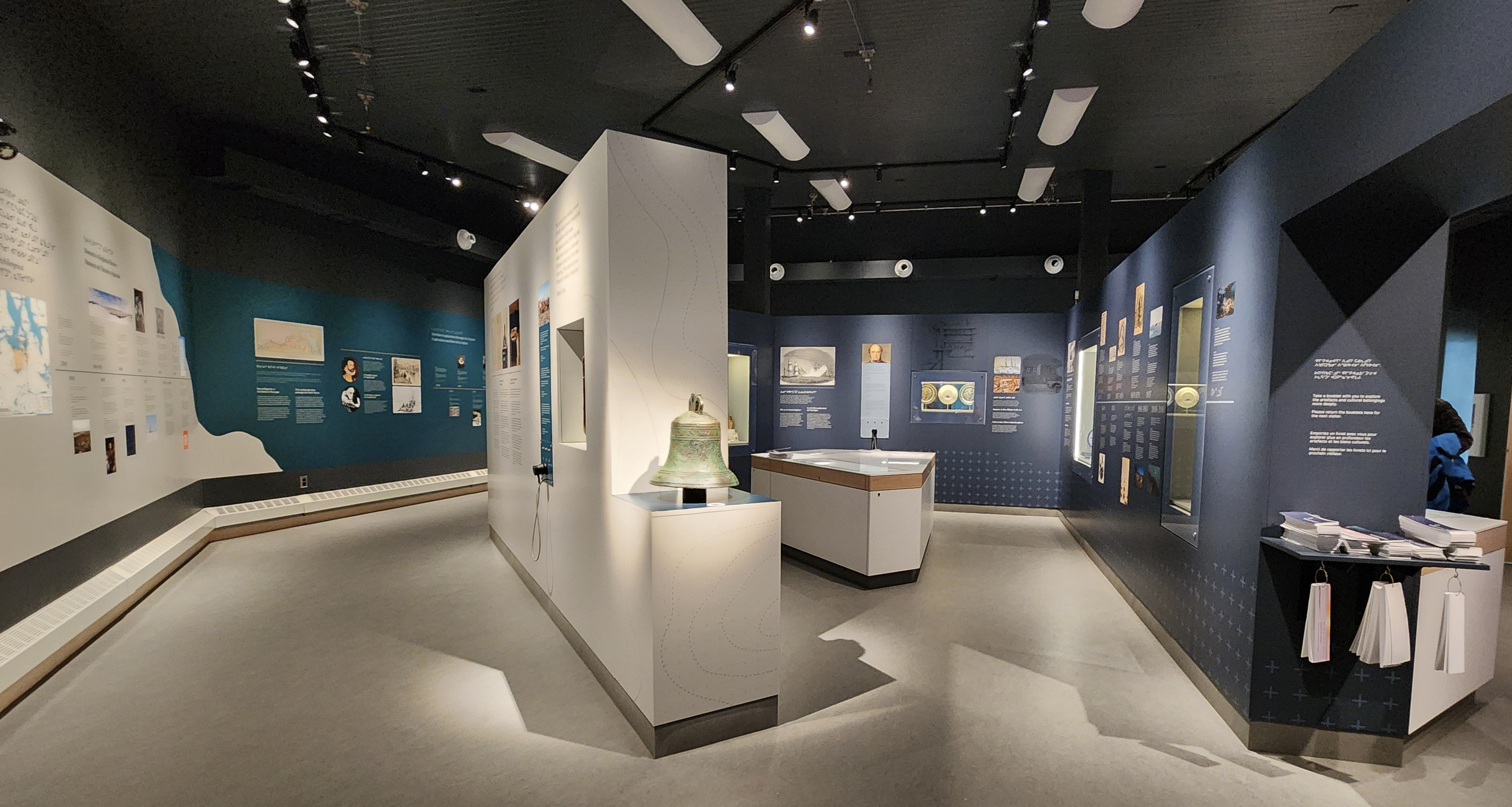
The Franklin expansion

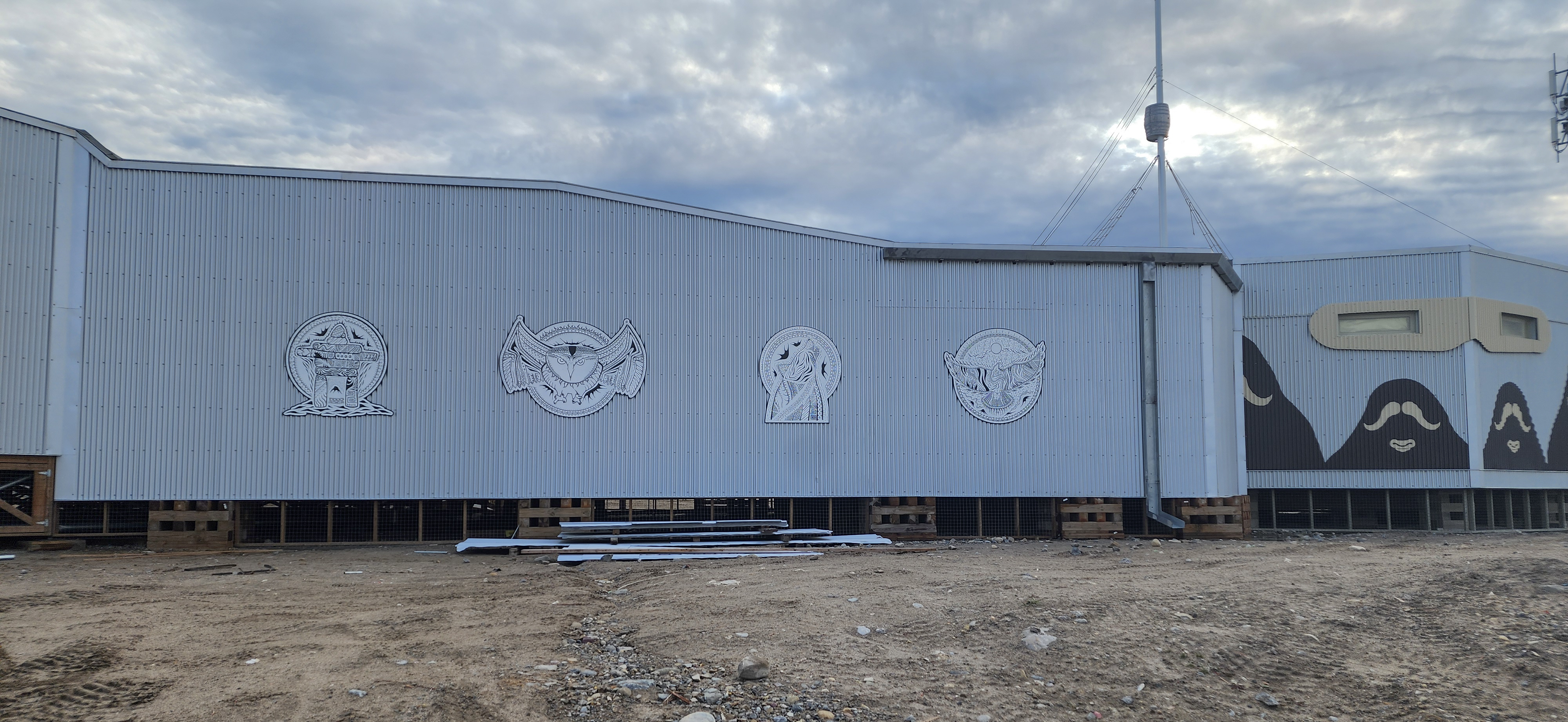
Art on the outside of the centre

== See also ==
- List of museums in Canada
