= HMS Erebus (1826) =

Hecla-class bomb vessel best known for Antarctic and Arctic exploration

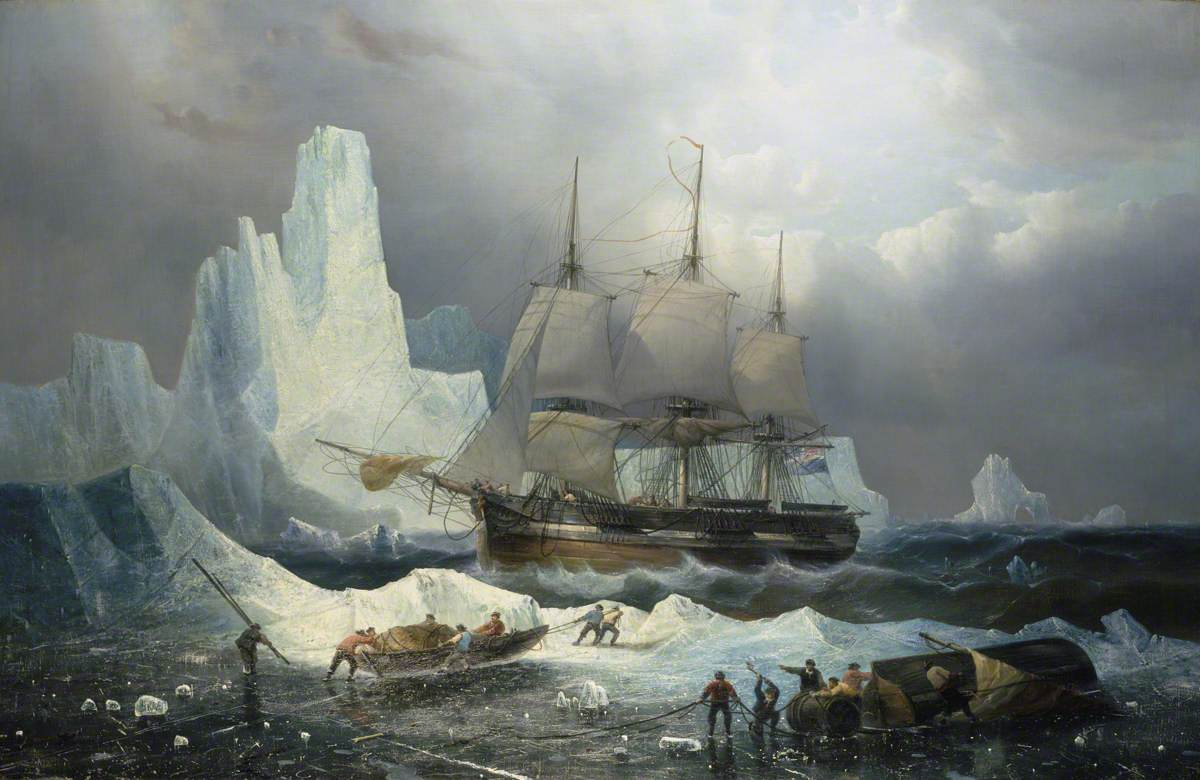
- Erebus in the Ice, 1846, by François Musin

History

United Kingdom
- Name: HMS Erebus
- Namesake: Erebus
- Ordered: 9 January 1823
- Builder: Pembroke Dock, Wales
- Laid down: October 1824
- Launched: 7 June 1826
- Fate: Abandoned 22 April 1848, King William Island
- Wreck discovered: 2 September 2014, Wilmot and Crampton Bay

General characteristics
- Type: Hecla-class bomb vessel
- Displacement: 715.3 long tons (727 t)
- Tons burthen: 372 tons (bm)
- Length: 105 ft (32 m)
- Beam: 29 ft (8.84 m)
- Installed power: 30 Nominal horsepower
- Propulsion: Sail, steam engine
- Complement: 67
- Armament: 1 × 13 in (330 mm) mortar; 1 × 10 in (254 mm) mortar; 8 × 24 pdr (10.9 kg) guns; 2 × 6 pdr (2.7 kg) guns

National Historic Site of Canada
- Official name: Wrecks of HMS Erebus and HMS Terror National Historic Site
- Designated: 2019

HMS Erebus was a Hecla-class bomb vessel constructed by the Royal Navy in Pembroke dockyard, Wales, in 1826. The vessel was the second in the Royal Navy named after Erebus, the personification of darkness in Greek mythology.

The 372-ton ship was armed with two mortars – one 13 in (330 mm) and one 10 in (254 mm) – and 10 guns. The ship was refitted as an exploration vessel and took part in the Ross expedition of 1839–1843. She was abandoned in 1848 during the third Franklin expedition. The sunken wreck was discovered by the Canadian Victoria Strait expedition in September 2014.

== Ross expedition ==
After two years' service in the Mediterranean Sea, Erebus was refitted as an exploration vessel for Antarctic service, and on 21 November 1840 – captained by James Clark Ross – she departed from Van Diemen's Land (now Tasmania) for Antarctica in company with HMS Terror. In January 1841, the crews of both ships landed on Victoria Land, and proceeded to name areas of the landscape after British politicians, scientists, and acquaintances. Mount Erebus, on Ross Island, was named after one ship and Mount Terror after the other.

The crew then discovered the Ross Ice Shelf, which they were unable to penetrate, and followed it eastward until the lateness of the season compelled them to return to Van Diemen's Land. The following season, 1842, Ross continued to survey the "Great Ice Barrier", as it was called, continuing to follow it eastward. Both ships returned to the Falkland Islands before returning to the Antarctic in the 1842–1843 season. They conducted studies in magnetism, and returned with oceanographic data and collections of botanical and ornithological specimens. The plants were described in the resulting The Botany of the Antarctic Voyage of H.M. Discovery Ships Erebus and Terror in the years 1839–1843, under the Command of Captain Sir James Clark Ross.

Birds collected on the first expedition were described and illustrated by George Robert Gray and Richard Bowdler Sharpe in The Zoology of the Voyage of HMS Erebus & HMS Terror. Birds of New Zealand, 1875. The revised edition of Gray (1846) (1875). The future botanist Joseph Dalton Hooker, then aged 23, was assistant-surgeon to Robert McCormick.

== Franklin expedition ==
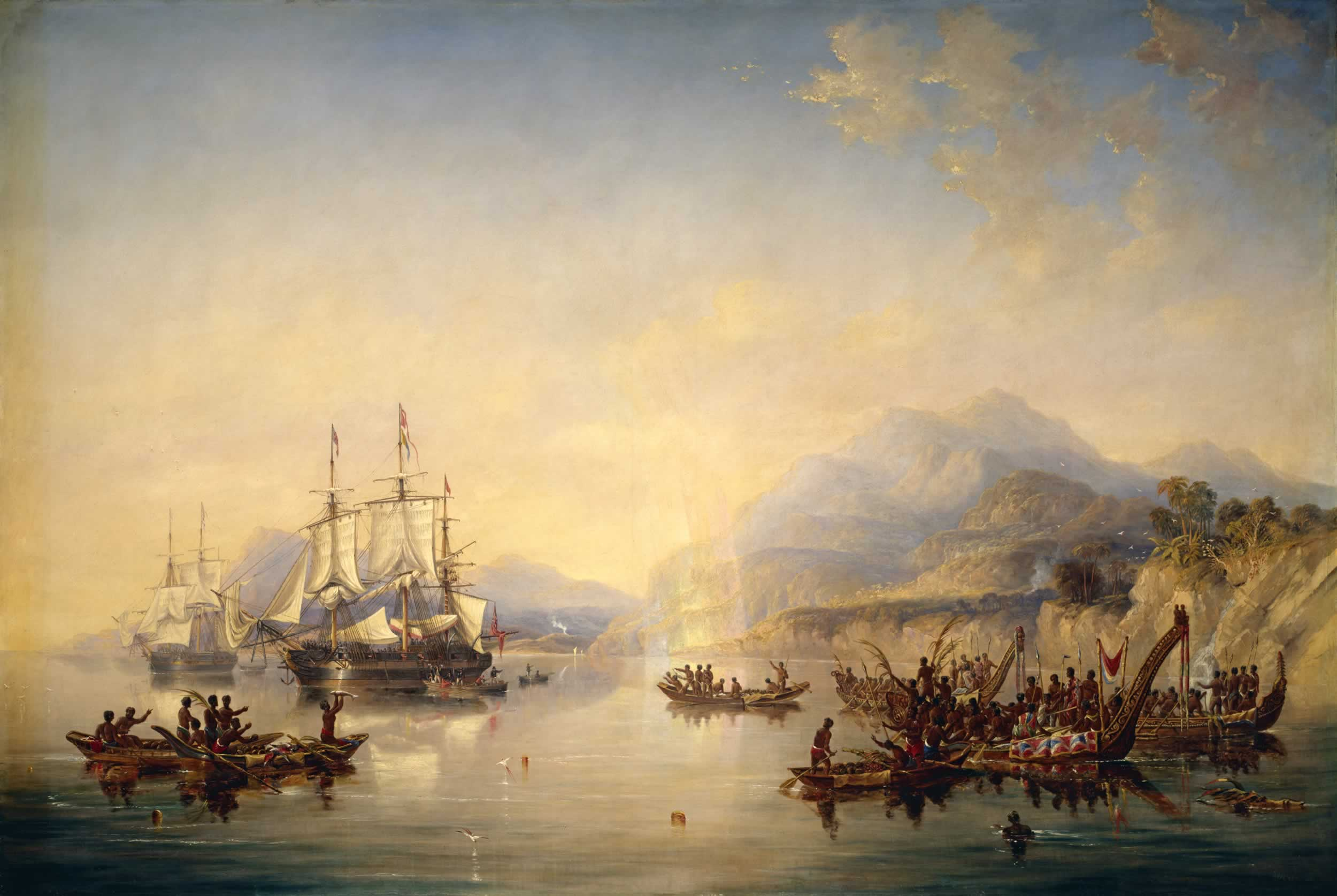
'Erebus' and the 'Terror' in New Zealand, August 1841, by John Wilson Carmichael.

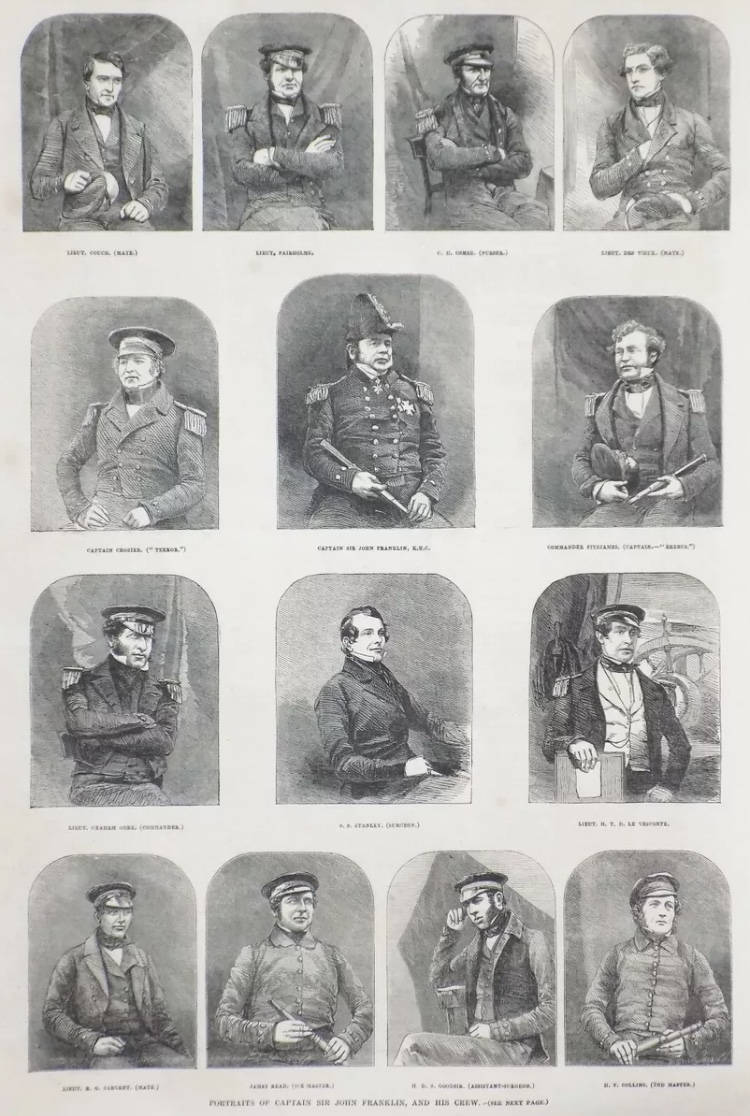
Erebus officers:Top row left to right:Lt. Edward Couch (mate); James Walter Fairholme; Charles Hamilton Osmer (Purser); Charles Frederick Des Voeux [2nd Mate]. 2nd row from top Left to right: Francis Crozier (HMS Terror); Sir John Franklin; James Fitzjames. 3rd row from top left to right: Graham Gore (Commander); Stephen Samuel Stanley (Surgeon); 2nd Lt. Henry Thomas Dundas Le Vesconte. Bottom row left to right: Robert Orme Sergeant [1st mate]; James Reid [Master]; Harry Duncan Goodsir (Assistant Surgeon); Henry Foster Collins (2nd Master), sketches from daguerreotypes by Richard Beard – The Illustrated London News (1845)

On May 19, 1845, HMS Erebus and HMS Terror left Greenhithe, England on a voyage of exploration to the Canadian Arctic, under Sir John Franklin. Both ships were outfitted with steam engines from the London and Greenwich Railway steam locomotives. That of Erebus was rated at 25 horsepower (19 kW) and could propel the ship at 4 knots (7.4 km/h). The ships carried 12 days' supply of coal. The ships had iron plating added to their hulls.

Sir John Franklin sailed in Erebus, in overall command of the expedition, and Terror was again commanded by Francis Crozier. The expedition was ordered to gather magnetic data in the Canadian Arctic and to complete a crossing of the Northwest Passage, which had already been partly charted from both the east and west but had never been entirely navigated.

The ships were last seen by Europeans entering Baffin Bay in August 1845, by two whaling vessels. The disappearance of the Franklin expedition set off a massive search effort in the Arctic. The broad circumstances of the expedition's fate were first revealed when Hudson's Bay Company doctor John Rae collected artefacts and testimony from local Inuit in 1853. Later expeditions up to 1866 confirmed these reports.

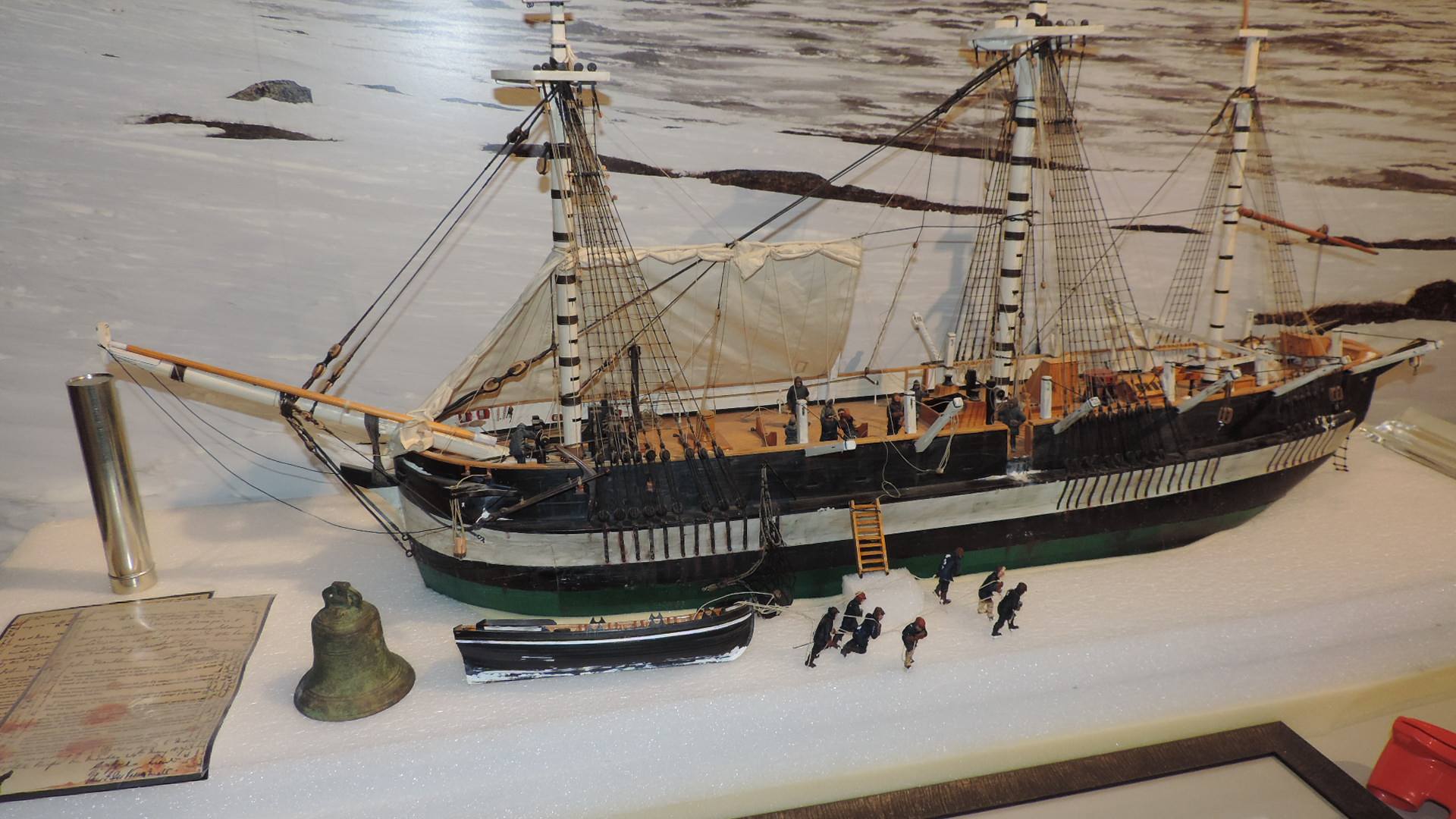
Model of Erebus trapped in the ice, Nattilik Heritage Centre, Gjoa Haven, September 2019

Both ships had become icebound and had been abandoned by their crews, totaling about 130 men, all of whom died from a variety of causes, including hypothermia, scurvy and starvation while trying to trek overland to the south. Subsequent expeditions until the late 1980s, and autopsies of crew members, also revealed that Erebus and Terror's shoddily canned rations may have been tainted by both lead and botulism. Oral reports by local Inuit that some of the crew members resorted to cannibalism were at least somewhat supported by forensic evidence of cut marks on the skeletal remains of crew members found on King William Island during the late 20th century.

In April 1851, the British transport ship Renovation spotted two ships on a large ice floe off the coast of Newfoundland. The identities of the ships were not confirmed. It was suggested over the years that these might have been Erebus and Terror, though it is now certain they could not have been and were most likely abandoned whaling ships.

== Wreckage discovery ==
On the 15 August 2008, Parks Canada, an agency of the Government of Canada, announced a Can$ 75,000 six-week search deploying the icebreaker Sir Wilfrid Laurier, with the goals of finding the ships and reinforcing Canada's claims regarding sovereignty over large portions of the Arctic. The search was headed by underwater archeologist Robert Grenier, of Parks Canada, and local historian Louie Kamookak, who had collected Inuit oral histories related to the wreck, as well as working with the written records. Kamookak, who died in 2018 at the age of 58, was made an officer of the Order of Canada and a member of the Order of Nunavut for his work.

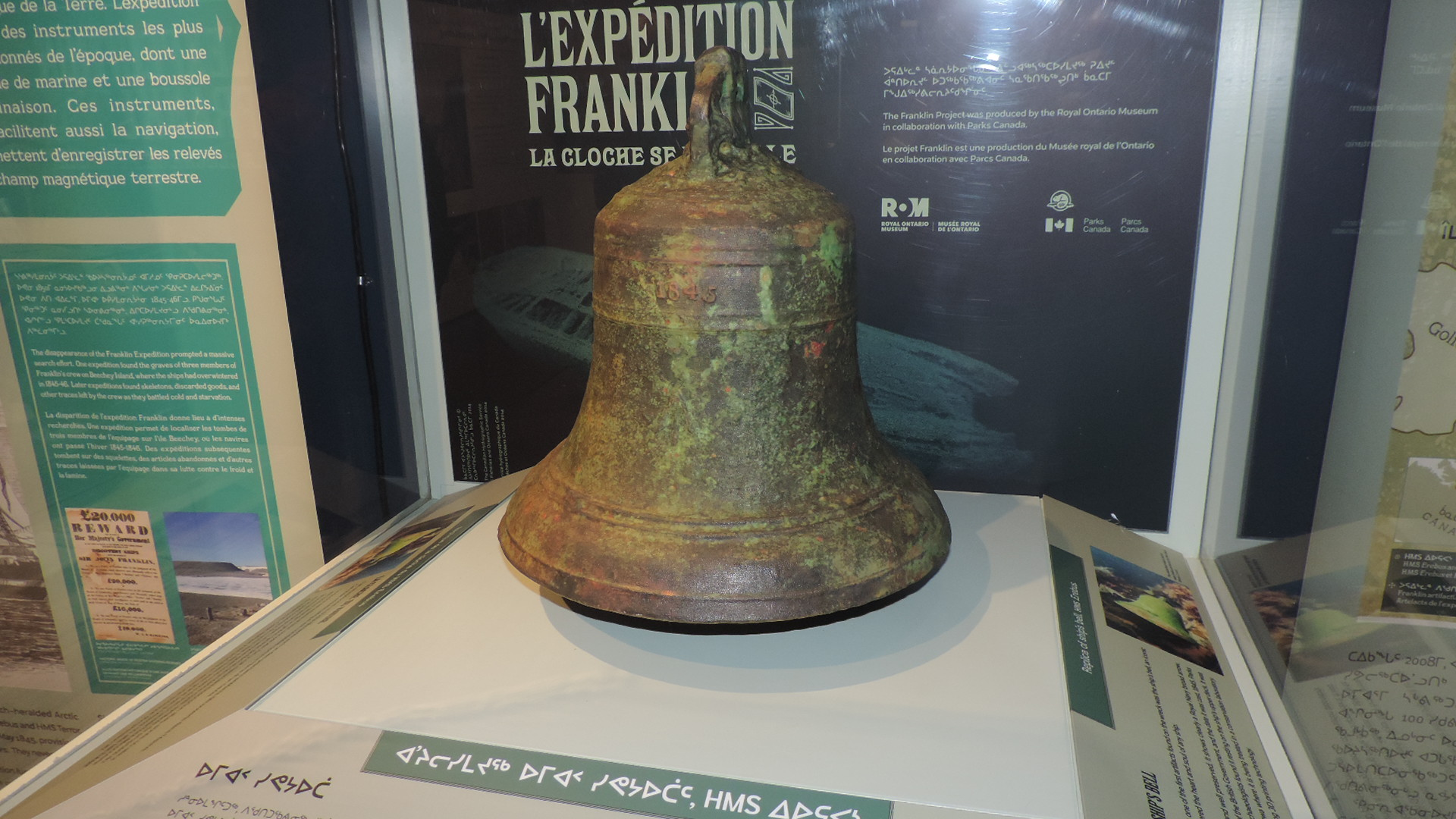
Ship's bell from HMS Erebus, bearing the date 1845, at the Nattilik Heritage Centre, Gjoa Haven, 2019

The wreckage of one of Franklin's ships was found on 2 September 2014 by a Parks Canada team led by Ryan Harris and Marc-André Bernier. On 1 October 2014, it was announced that the remains were those of Erebus. Recovery of the ship's bell was announced on 6 November 2014. On 4 March 2015, it was announced that a diving expedition on Erebus, by Parks Canada and Royal Canadian Navy divers, would begin in April.

Although the exact location was not released, Nancy Anilniliak, the Field Unit Superintendent of the Nunavut Field Unit, has restricted access to a 10 by 10 kilometres (6 mi × 6 mi) square area in Wilmot and Crampton Bay, to the west of the Adelaide Peninsula. The area runs from Point A (68°14′44.8″N 98°52′22.3″W) to Point B (68°17′44.2″N 98°40′17.9″W) to Point C (68°13′15.4″N 98°32′16.2″W) to Point D (68°10′16.5″N 98°44′19.3″W).

On 12 September 2016, it was announced that the wreck of HMS Terror had been found submerged in Terror Bay, off the south-west coast of King William Island. The wrecks are designated a National Historic Site of Canada with the precise location of the designation in abeyance. On 23 October 2017, British Defence Minister Sir Michael Fallon announced that the United Kingdom would transfer the ownership of both ships to Canada, retaining only a few relics and any gold, along with the right to repatriate any human remains.

In September 2018, Parks Canada announced that Erebus' condition had deteriorated significantly, with a 14 metres (46 ft) section of the upper deck detaching from the ship, flipping over, and moving towards the stern. Parks Canada attributed the deterioration to "an upwards buoyant force acting on the decking combined with storm swell in relatively shallow water". It was then confirmed that the United Kingdom will own the first 65 artifacts brought up from Erebus while the wrecks of both ships and other artifacts will be owned by Canada and the Inuit. Taking advantage of "sublime" weather conditions in the summer of 2019, Parks Canada were able to recover a number of artifacts from Erebus, namely personal items belonging to members of the crew, which were unveiled at Parks Canada's conservation lab in Ottawa in February 2020. The planned exploration of the wreck sites in 2020 was cancelled due to the COVID-19 pandemic, with access to the wrecks restricted to the Inuit Guardians keeping watch on the sites and for those with harvesting rights in the surrounding waters. Underwater archaeology team leader Marc-Andre Bernier remarked that Parks Canada was "concerned about Erebus", given the wreck's shallower depths and the earlier reports of damage. Parks Canada's Underwater Archaeology Team returned to the wrecks in May 2022, after a two-year postponement caused by the pandemic; particular attention would be paid to any further damage to Erebus, due to her shallower depths. Recovered from Erebus during the 2022 season were 275 items, most prominently a leather-bound folio discovered in the steward's pantry. The Parks Canada team has expressed the hope that deciphering its contents, whatever they might be, may bode well for future discoveries of written materials from both ships.

== Public access ==
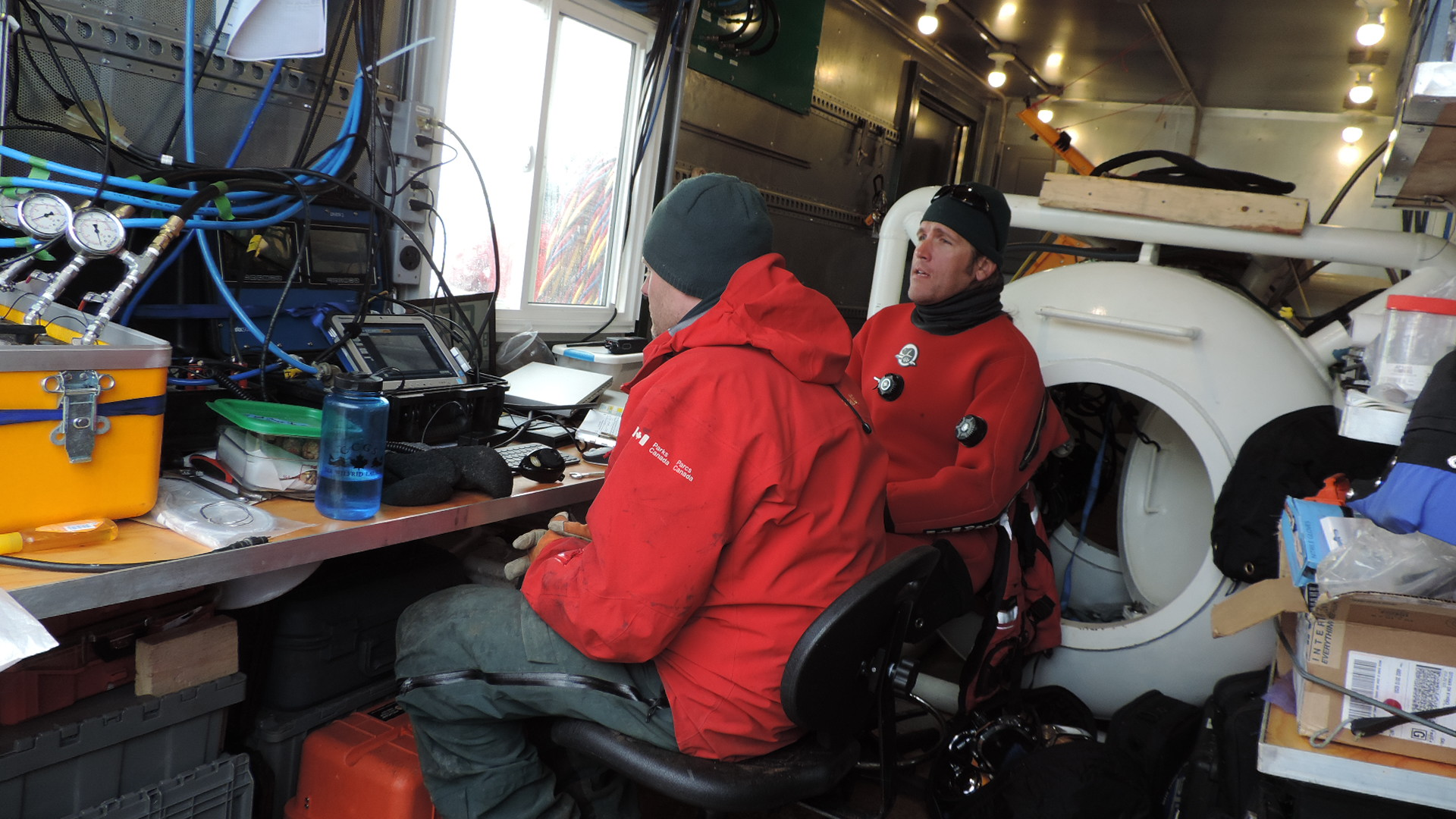
On board Parks Canada's archeology support barge "Qiniqtiryuaq" beside the wreck of HMS Erebus, September 2019

On 5 September 2019, passengers of Adventure Canada on MS Ocean Endeavour were the first members of the public to visit the site of the wreck of the Erebus. The wreck site is within the Wrecks of HMS Erebus and HMS Terror National Historic Site and is managed jointly by Parks Canada and local Inui, and public access to the site is not usually allowed. The visit by Adventure Canada passengers was a trial by Parks Canada in creating a visitor experience for the wreck site.

== Legacy ==
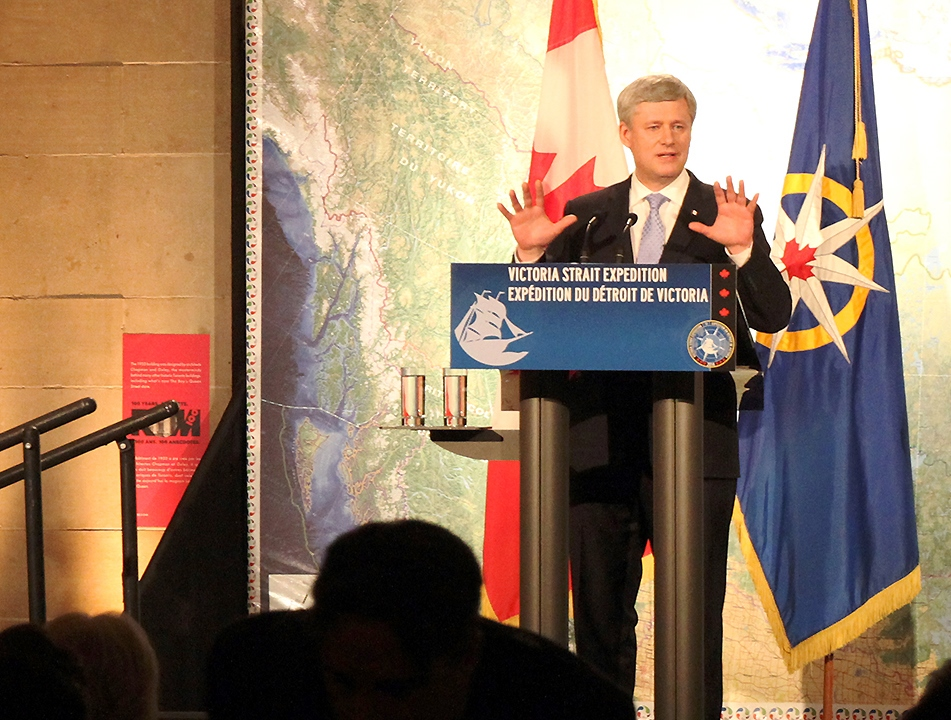
Canadian Prime Minister Stephen Harper appearing at a gala to celebrate the discovery of HMS Erebus, at the Royal Ontario Museum in Toronto

=== In art, entertainment, and media ===
HMS Erebus is featured, often alongside HMS Terror, in fictional works that use the Franklin expedition in their backstories, such as:

- Captain Nemo mentions Erebus and Terror, in the context of Captain Ross's expedition, in Jules Verne's Twenty Thousand Leagues Under the Seas (1870), as background to establish the difficulty of reaching the South Pole, while Captain Nemo stands upon its fictional summit.
- Erebus and Terror are mentioned in Joseph Conrad's novella Heart of Darkness (1899).
- Terror and Erebus (1965) is a verse radio play for CBC Radio by Canadian poet Gwendolyn MacEwen, subsequently published in her collection Afterworlds (1987).
- Terror and Erebus (A Lament for Franklin) (1997) is an oratorio for solo baritone and chamber ensemble by Canadian composer Henry Kucharzyk, adapted from MacEwen's verse drama and crediting her for its libretto.
- Ice Blink: The Tragic Fate of Sir John Franklin's Lost Polar Expedition (2001), by Scott Cookman, offers a journalistic account of Franklin's expedition.
- Erebus and Terror appear in Dan Simmons' novel The Terror (2007), which is a fictional account of the expedition's fate.
  - The Terror is a 2018 American television series based on Simmons' book.
- Clive Cussler's novel, Arctic Drift (2008), uses Erebus and Terror as part of the plot as well as the establishing backstory of the ill-fated expedition.
- "Erebus" (2012) is a radio play for BBC Radio 4, based on the Franklin expedition, by British poet Jo Shapcott.
- Erebus: The Story of a Ship (2018, published by Hutchinson (a division of Random House), by Michael Palin, is an account of the ship, covering its loss in the Arctic, Antarctic exploration, and back to its construction in Milford Haven. The book was serialized on BBC Radio 4 in 2018.
- Erebus and Terror is the sixth track on the 2016 album, Further Than Rust by Canadian folk band, Nickeltree.
- The Erebus and the Terror, an instrumental piece composed by Mícheál Ó Domhnaill, is the third track on the 1987 album Something of Time by Nightnoise.
- Erebus and Terror is the ninth track on the 2019 album, Embrace of the Godless Aeon by Welsh symphonic black metal band Hecate Enthroned.

=== In namesakes ===
- Mount Erebus, located on Ross Island adjacent to the volcanically inactive Mount Terror, is the second-highest volcano in Antarctica (after Mount Sidley) and the southernmost active volcano on Earth.
- Erebus Bay lies between Cape Evans and Hut Point Peninsula, on the west side of Ross Island.
- Erebus and Terror Gulf, in Antarctica. Named after the vessels used by Royal Navy Captain Sir James Clark Ross in exploring the area in 1842–43.
- Erebus crystal is a type of feldspar found in the immediate area surrounding Mount Erebus; the crystals grow in the magma beneath Mount Erebus and are ejected out of the mountain encased in glassy volcanic bombs.
- Erebus (crater) is a geological feature on the planet Mars, named after HMS Erebus, and visited by the Opportunity rover on the way to the much larger crater Victoria.
- Erebus Street in the suburb of Keilor Park in Melbourne, Australia

== See also ==
- European and American voyages of scientific exploration
