= Frozen in Time: The Fate of the Franklin Expedition =

1987 book by Owen Beattie and John Geiger

- Updated edition cover
- Author: John G. Geiger and Owen Beattie
- Language: English
- Published: 1987
- Publisher: Bloomsbury Publishing
- Publication place: United Kingdom
- ISBN: 0-586-20320-6

Frozen in Time: The Fate of the Franklin Expedition is a book by Owen Beattie and John Geiger, first published in 1987 by Bloomsbury Publishing. The book focuses on the dramatic events surrounding the Franklin Expedition of 1845-1848, led by Sir John Franklin, as well as the scientific work and forensic testing on the bodies of three perfectly preserved Victorian seamen 138 years after their deaths, solving the mysteries of the Franklin Expedition. In 2004, the authors substantially revised the book, adding an epilogue and altering and updating the text. Margaret Atwood wrote an introduction. In 2017, the authors added a new afterword to the Canadian edition, and a new foreword by Wade Davis was added.

== Content ==
Frozen in Time: The Fate of the Franklin Expedition has two parts, each covering a certain aspect of the Franklin Expedition. Part One focuses on the history of the expedition and the circumstances that led to its disastrous result, based on the findings of Owen Beattie and his team. On 19 May 1845, Sir John Franklin and a crew of 128 men, along with the vessels HMS Terror and HMS Erebus, set sail from Greenhithe, England in search of the Northwest Passage. The Northwest Passage is a shipping route through the Arctic archipelago to the Pacific Ocean and was very sought after by the Admiralty and many sailors, due to its economic value as it was a short route connecting the Atlantic ocean and the Pacific ocean. In an effort to traverse the passage, the two ships became icebound on the coast of King William Island in the Canadian Arctic and the entire expedition was lost with only fragmentary evidence that gave clues to the fate of Franklin and his men. In 1981, Owen Beattie, an associate Professor of Anthropology at the University of Alberta, led a team of scientists to King William Island where they planned to retrace the steps of dying Franklin crewmen 133 years before. Beattie and his team successfully discovered fragmentary remains such as human bones of Franklin crewmen and through scientific analysis, had found cut marks on the bones, corroborating past Inuit accounts of cannibalism being practised among the dying Franklin crewmen. Further forensic analysis on the bones also led to the discovery of high lead levels, which led to the theory that the Franklin crewmen had succumbed to lead poisoning. The discovery of lead in the bones would lead Beattie and his team to Beechey Island to exhume the graves of three Franklin crewmen to determine the origins of lead in the expedition and the effect it had on the crewmen.

Part Two of the book focuses on the exhumation of the three graves on Beechey Island and the autopsies performed on the exhumed bodies of the crewmen to further determine the cause of death. Each grave included a headstone which provided important details such as name, age and year of death and the graves were of Petty Officer John Torrington, Able-bodied Seaman John Hartnell and Royal Marine William Braine. Beattie had obtained exhumation and reburial permits from the government of the Northwest Territories, notification of permission from the Royal Canadian Mounted Police and clearance from the Chief Medical Officer. In the book, Beattie and Geiger provide extensive details on the investigation and autopsy work along with photographs of the bodies and the gravesite for later restoration. After careful exhumation, the bodies were shown to be remarkably well preserved, due to the surrounding permafrost, allowing for testing on preserved tissue. The autopsies determined that tuberculosis, scurvy and lead poisoning were large factors in the deaths of these men. Near the gravesite, Beattie had discovered a pile of tin cans, which was the storage for food on the Franklin expedition. Through forensic testing, the lead soldering found on the cans matched the lead found in the bodies, determining that lead from the cans had contaminated the food supply and caused the deaths of many in the Franklin expedition. There is a portion of the book in which Beattie and Geiger use the evidence to theoretically reconstruct the final hours of the three Franklin crewmen in a way they believe may have happened as well as theoretical descriptions of how the burial processes transpired on Beechey Island in 1846.

== Reception ==
Frozen in Time: The Fate of the Franklin Expedition became a bestseller in the United Kingdom, Canada and Germany and was published in seven countries. Roy Herbert of New Scientist states "The account of the Franklin voyage and its aftermath and then the account of the recent exhumations and autopsies- are enthralling". Peter Gorner of the Chicago Tribune described it as "Chilling...The scientists' exhumations, autopsies and reburials-replete with haunting photos- will keep you up nights turning pages". Jacket blurbs were provided by Margaret Atwood, who described the research as "A remarkable piece of forensic deduction", and by William S. Burroughs who called the book "A cautionary tale of scholarly merit."

== Cultural references ==
Frozen in Time: The Fate of the Franklin Expedition has inspired a number of writers, including Margaret Atwood in her short story "The Age of Lead" from Wilderness Tips as well as in her Strange Things: The Malevolent North in Canadian Literature collection story Concerning Franklin and His Gallant Crew. Mordecai Richler referenced Frozen in Time in his novel Solomon Gursky Was Here. In addition, Frozen in Time has been cited as an influence for Dan Simmons' 2007 novel The Terror, which was adapted into AMC's television series of the same name. English actor and Monty Python member Michael Palin also referenced Frozen in Time, calling it "groundbreaking" in his Erebus: One Ship, Two Epic Voyages, and the Greatest Naval Mystery of All Time. Frozen in Time was also referenced in Elizabeth McGregor's The Ice Child.
