= Northwest Passage =

Sea route north of North America

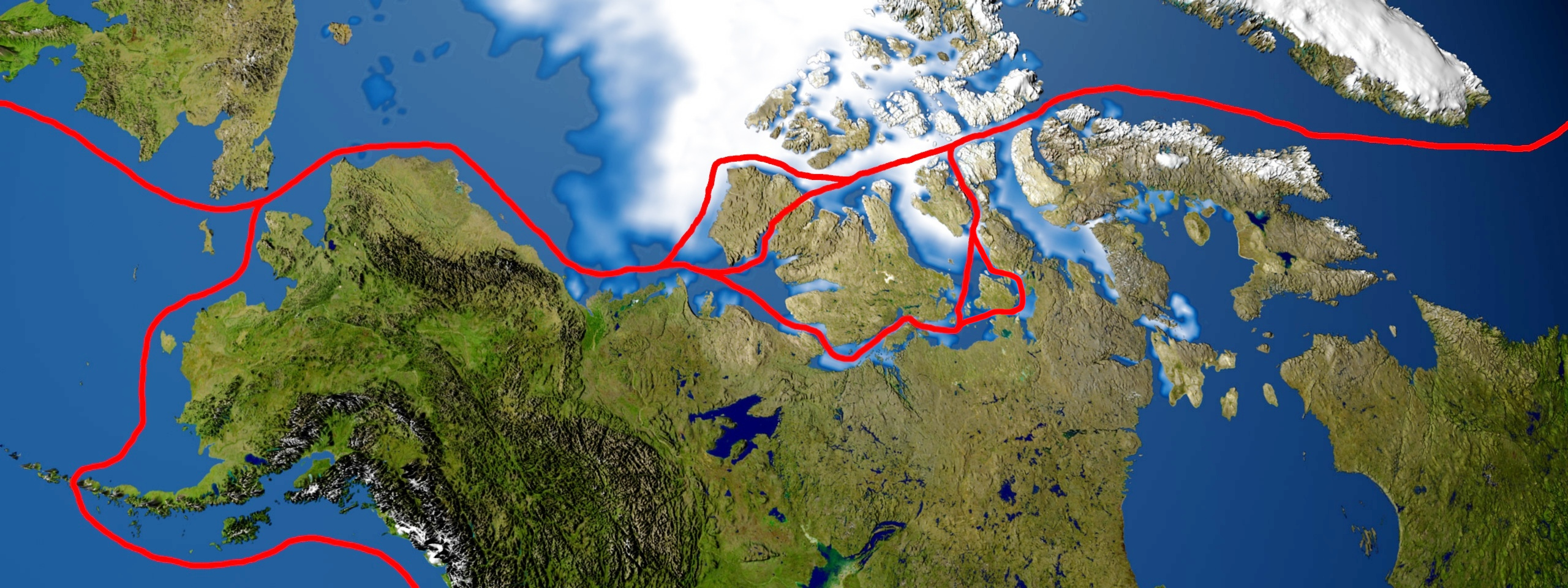
Northwest Passage routes

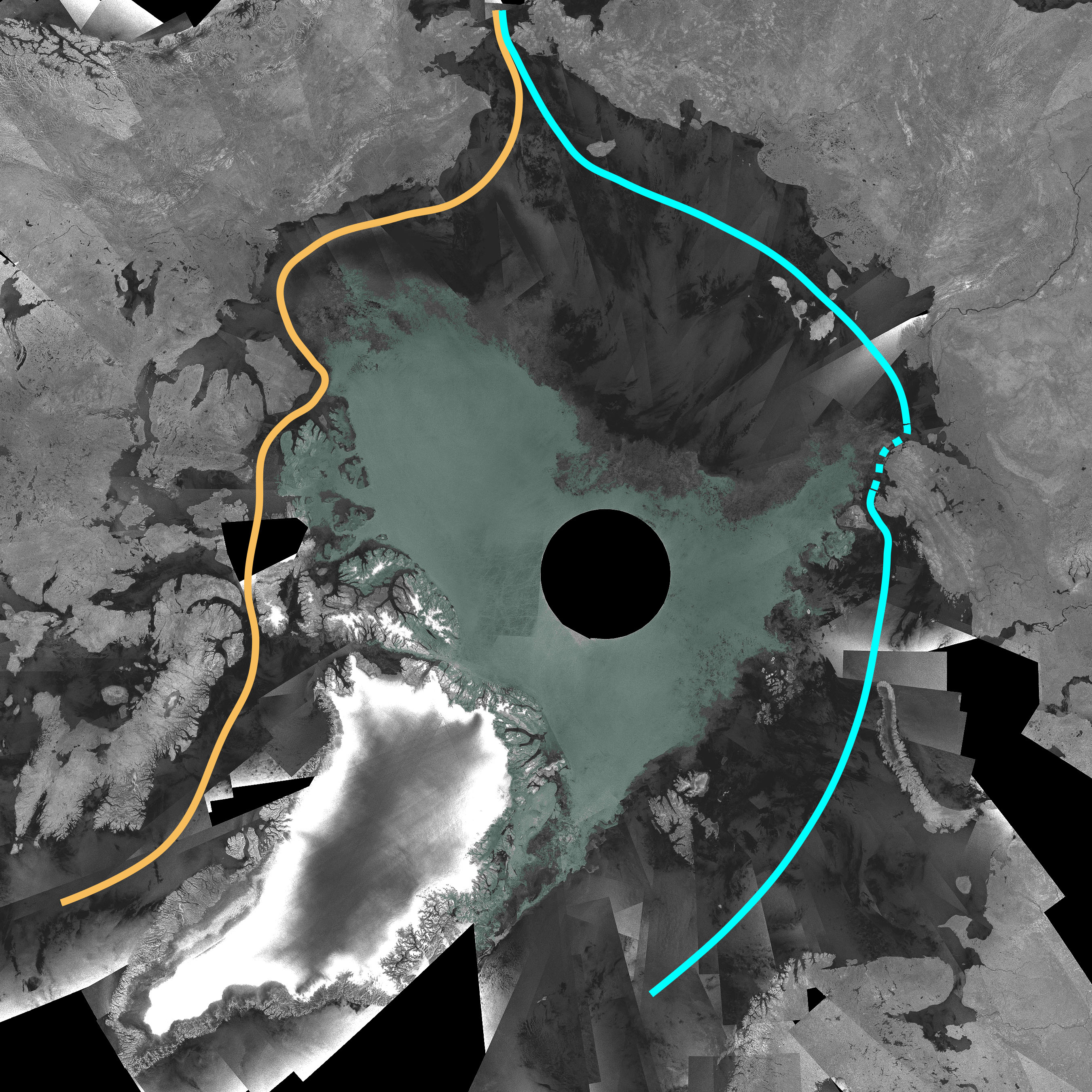
Envisat ASAR mosaic of the Arctic Ocean (September 2007), showing the most direct route of the Northwest Passage open (yellow line) and the Northeast Passage partially opened (blue line). The dark grey colour represents the ice-free areas, while green represents areas with sea ice.

The Northwest Passage (NWP) is the sea lane between the Atlantic and Pacific oceans through the Arctic Ocean, near the northern coast of North America via waterways through the Arctic Archipelago of Canada. The eastern route along the Arctic coasts of Norway and Siberia is accordingly called the Northeast Passage (NEP). The various islands of the archipelago are separated from one another and from mainland Canada by a series of Arctic waterways collectively known as the Northwest Passages, Northwestern Passages or the Canadian Internal Waters. In British English, it is often spelled North-west Passage.

For centuries, European explorers, beginning with Christopher Columbus in 1492, sought a navigable passage as a possible trade route to Asia, but were blocked by North, Central, and South America; by ice, or by rough waters (e.g. Tierra del Fuego). An ice-bound northern route was discovered in 1850 by the Irish explorer Robert McClure, whose expedition completed the passage by hauling sledges. Scotsman John Rae explored a more southerly area in 1854 through which Norwegian Roald Amundsen made the first complete passage entirely by ship in 1903–1906. Until 2009, the Arctic pack ice prevented regular marine shipping throughout most of the year. Arctic sea ice decline, linked primarily to climate change, has rendered the waterways more navigable for ice navigation.

The contested sovereignty claims over the waters may complicate future shipping through the region: the Canadian government maintains that the Northwestern Passages are part of Canadian Internal Waters, but the United States claims that they are an international strait and transit passage, allowing free and unencumbered passage. If, as Tom Paddon, Baffinland's chief executive, told the Arctic Futures 2013 conference in Brussels, parts of the eastern end of the Passage are barely 15 metres (49 ft) deep, the route's viability as a Euro-Asian shipping route is reduced. In 2016, Chinese shipping line COSCO expressed a desire to make regular voyages of cargo ships using the passage to the eastern United States and Europe, after a successful passage by Nordic Orion of 73,500 tonnes deadweight tonnage in September 2013. Fully laden, Nordic Orion sat too deep in the water to sail through the Panama Canal.

== Routes ==
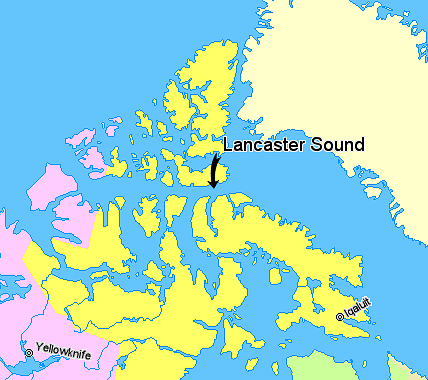
Parry Channel: East end at Lancaster Sound north of Baffin Island.

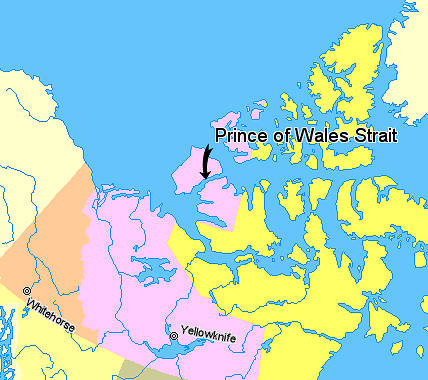
Parry Channel: West end at Prince of Wales Strait northwest of Victoria Island.

The Northwest Passage has three sections:

- East
  - East of Baffin Island: Baffin Bay between Greenland and Baffin Island to Lancaster Sound at the north end of Baffin Island, or
  - West of Baffin Island (impractical): Through Hudson Strait south of Baffin Island, north through the Foxe Basin, west through the Fury and Hecla Strait, north to Lancaster Sound through the Gulf of Boothia and Prince Regent Inlet. The Fury and Hecla Strait is usually closed by ice.
- Centre: Canadian Arctic Archipelago
  - North: From Lancaster Sound west through the Parry Channel to the Prince of Wales Strait on the northwest side of Victoria Island. M'Clure Strait to the northwest is ice-filled; southwest through the Prince of Wales Strait between Victoria Island and Banks Island might be passable, or
  - South: From Lancaster Sound west past Prince Regent Inlet (basically a cul-de-sac but it may be possible to exit west through the Bellot Strait), past Somerset Island, south through Peel Sound between Somerset Island and Prince of Wales Island, either southwest through Victoria Strait (ice-choked), or directly south along the coast through Rae Strait and James Ross Strait and west through Simpson Strait south of King William Island (shallow) into Queen Maud Gulf, then west along the mainland coast south of Victoria Island.
- West: There being no major islands, follow the coast to the Bering Strait.

Many attempts were made to find a salt water exit west from Hudson Bay, but the Fury and Hecla Strait in the far north is blocked by ice. The eastern entrance and main axis of the northwest passage, the Parry Channel, was found in 1819. The approach from the west through Bering Strait is impractical because of the need to sail around ice near Point Barrow. East of Point Barrow the coast is fairly clear in summer. This area was mapped in pieces from overland in 1821–1839. This leaves the large rectangle north of the coast, south of Parry Channel and west of Baffin Island. This area was mostly mapped in 1848–1854 by ships looking for Franklin's lost expedition. The first crossing was made by Roald Amundsen in 1903–1906. He used a small ship and hugged the coast.

== Overview ==
=== Early expeditions ===
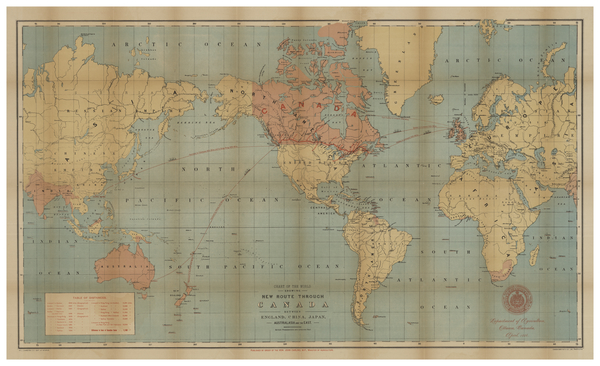
Chart of the World showing New Route (the Canadian Pacific Railway) through Canada between England, China, Japan, Australasia and the East (1886)

Before the Little Ice Age (late Middle Ages to the 19th century), Norwegian Vikings sailed as far north and west as Ellesmere Island, Skraeling Island and Ruin Island for hunting expeditions and trading with the Inuit and people of the Dorset culture who inhabited the region. Between the end of the 15th century and the 20th century, colonial powers from Europe dispatched explorers to discover a commercial sea route north and west around North America. The Northwest Passage represented a new route to the established trading nations of Asia.

England called the hypothetical northern route the "Northwest Passage". The desire to establish such a route motivated much of the European exploration of both coasts of North America. When it became apparent that there was no route through the heart of the continent, attention turned to the possibility of a passage through northern waters. There was a lack of scientific knowledge about conditions; for instance, some people believed that seawater was incapable of freezing. (As late as the mid-18th century, Captain James Cook had reported that Antarctic icebergs had yielded fresh water, seemingly confirming the hypothesis.) Explorers thought that an Open Polar Sea close to the North Pole must exist. The belief that a route lay to the far north persisted for several centuries and led to numerous expeditions into the Arctic. Many ended in disaster, including that by Sir John Franklin in 1845. While searching for him the McClure Arctic Expedition discovered the Northwest Passage in 1850.

In 1906, the Norwegian explorer Roald Amundsen was the first to complete the passage solely by ship, from Greenland to Alaska in the sloop Gjøa. Since that date, several ice-fortified ships have made the journey.

From east to west, the direction of most early exploration attempts, expeditions entered the passage from the Atlantic Ocean via the Davis Strait and through Baffin Bay, both of which are in Canada. Five to seven routes have been taken through the Canadian Arctic Archipelago, via the McClure Strait, Dease Strait, and the Prince of Wales Strait, but not all of them are suitable for larger ships. From there ships passed through westward through the Beaufort Sea and the Chukchi Sea, and then southwards through the Bering Strait (separating Russia and Alaska), into the Pacific Ocean.

=== Potential as a shipping lane ===
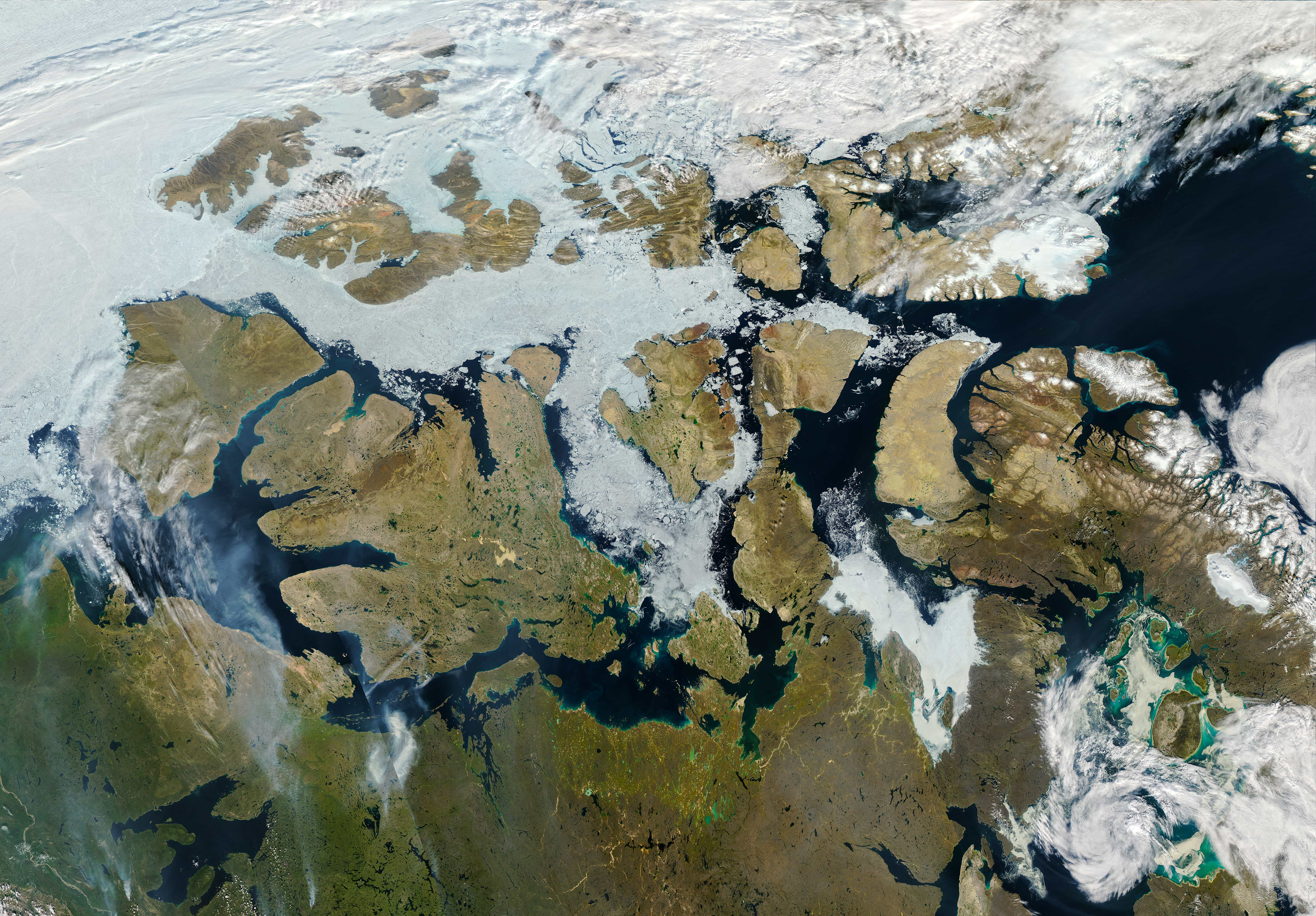
9 August 2013

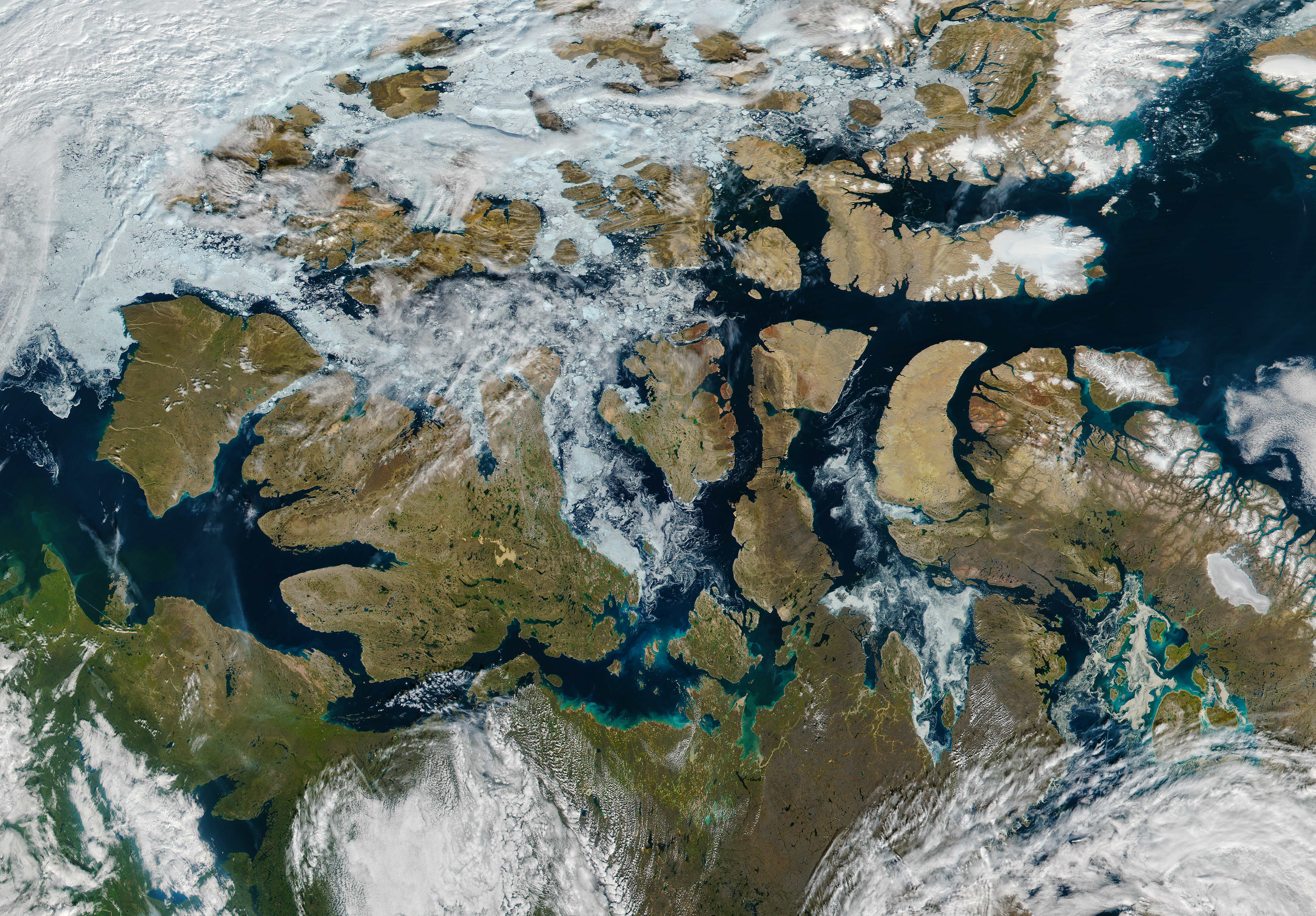
9 August 2016

The Northwest Passage is increasingly ice-free.

In the 21st century, major changes to the ice pack due to climate change have stirred speculation that the passage may become clear enough of ice to permit safe commercial shipping for at least part of the year. On August 21, 2007, the Northwest Passage became open to ships without the need of an icebreaker. According to Nalan Koc of the Norwegian Polar Institute, this was the first time the Passage has been clear since they began keeping records in 1972. The Northwest Passage opened again on August 25, 2008. It is usually reported that ocean thawing will open up the Northwest Passage (and the Northern Sea Route) for various kind of ships, making it possible to sail around the Arctic ice cap and possibly cutting thousands of miles off shipping routes. Warning that the NASA satellite images suggested that the Arctic had entered a "death spiral" caused by climate change, Professor Mark Serreze, a sea ice specialist at the U.S. National Snow and Ice Data Center (NSIDC) said: "The passages are open. It's a historic event. We are going to see this more and more as the years go by."

However, some thick sections of ice will remain hard to melt in the shorter term. Drifting and persistence of large chunks of ice, especially in springtime, can be problematic as they can clog entire straits or severely damage a ship's hull. Cargo routes may thus be slow and uncertain, depending on prevailing conditions and the ability to predict them. Because much containerized traffic operates in a just-in-time mode (which does not tolerate delays well) and because of the relative isolation of the passage (which impedes shipping companies from optimizing their operations by grouping multiple stopovers on the same itinerary), the Northwest Passage and other Arctic routes are not always seen as promising shipping lanes by industry insiders, at least for the time being. The uncertainty related to physical damage to ships is also thought to translate into higher insurance premiums, especially because of the technical challenges posed by Arctic navigation (as of 2014, only 12 percent of Canada's Arctic waters have been charted to modern standards). A 2025 study suggests that although the navigability may increase over time, reliable planning requires explicit consideration of highly variable ice conditions.

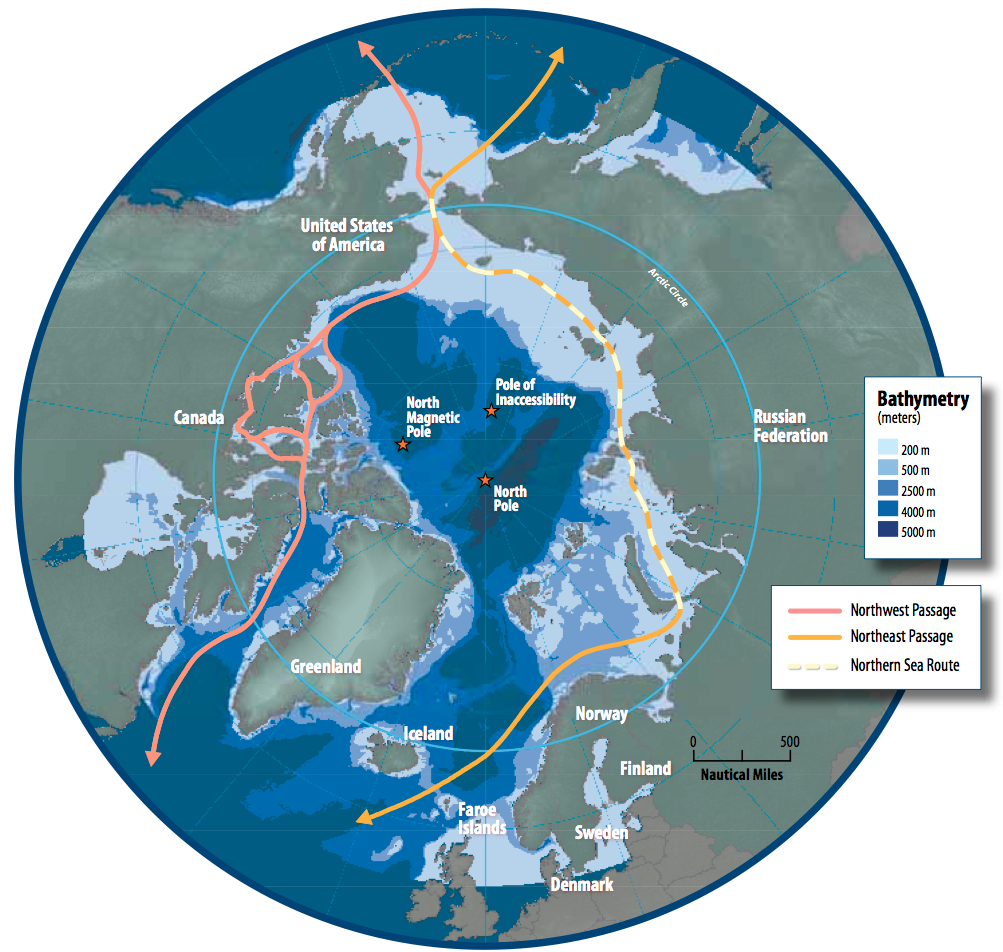
Map of the Arctic region showing the Northeast Passage, the Northern Sea Route within it, and the Northwest Passage

The Beluga group of Bremen, Germany, sent the first Western commercial vessels through the Northern Sea Route (Northeast Passage) in 2009. Canada's Prime Minister Stephen Harper announced that "ships entering the North-West passage should first report to his government".

The first commercial cargo ship to have sailed through the Northwest Passage was SS Manhattan in August 1969. SS Manhattan, of 115,000 deadweight tonnage, was the largest commercial vessel ever to navigate the Northwest Passage.

The largest passenger ship to navigate the Northwest Passage was the cruise liner Crystal Serenity of gross tonnage 69,000. Starting on August 10, 2016, the ship sailed from Vancouver to New York City with 1,500 passengers and crew, taking 28 days.

In 2018, two of the freighters leaving Baffinland's port in the Milne Inlet, on Baffin Island's north shore, were bound for ports in Asia. Those freighters did not sail west through the remainder of the Northwest Passage; they sailed east, rounded the tip of Greenland, and transited Russia's Northern Sea Route.

Experts predict that the passage may be traversable four months of the year by the end of the 21st century.

== Extent ==
The International Hydrographic Organization defines the limits of the Northwestern Passages as follows:

On the West. The Eastern limit of Beaufort Sea from Lands End through the Southwest coast of Prince Patrick Island to Griffiths Point, thence a line to Cape Prince Alfred, the Northwestern extreme of Banks Island, through its West coast to Cape Kellet, the Southwestern point, and thence a line to Cape Bathurst on the mainland (70°36′N 127°32′W).

On the Northwest. The Arctic Ocean between Lands End, Prince Patrick Island, and Cape Columbia, Ellesmere Island.

On the Northeast. The Coast of Ellesmere Island between C. Columbia and C. Sheridan the Northern limit of Baffin Bay.

On the East. The East Coast of Ellesmere Island between C. Sheridan and Cape Norton Shaw (76°29′N 78°30′W), thence across to Phillips Point (Coburg Island) through this Island to Marina Peninsula (75°55′N 79°10′W) and across to Cape Fitz Roy (Devon Island) down the East Coast to Cape Sherard (Cape Osborn) (74°35′N 80°30′W) and across to Cape Liverpool, Bylot Island (73°44′N 77°50′W); down the East coast of this island to Cape Graham Moore, its southeastern point, and thence across to Cape Macculloch (72°29′N 75°08′W) and down the East coast of Baffin Island to East Bluff, its Southeastern extremity, and thence the Eastern limit of Hudson Strait.

On the South. The mainland coast of Hudson Strait; the Northern limits of Hudson Bay; the mainland coast from Beach Point to Cape Bathurst.

== Historical expeditions ==
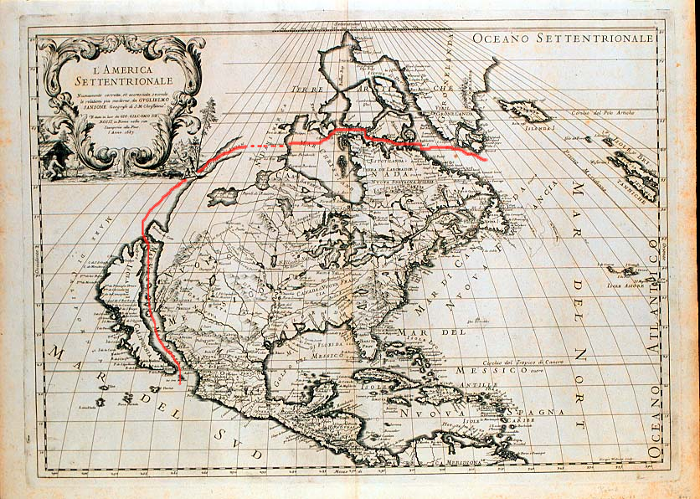
Assumed route of the Strait of Anián

As a result of their westward explorations and their settlement of Greenland, the Vikings sailed as far north and west as Ellesmere Island, Skraeling Island for hunting expeditions and trading with Inuit groups. The subsequent arrival of the Little Ice Age is thought to have been one of the reasons that European seafaring into the Northwest Passage ceased until the late 15th century.

=== Strait of Anián ===
In 1539, Hernán Cortés commissioned Francisco de Ulloa to sail along the Baja California Peninsula on the western coast of North America. Ulloa concluded that the Gulf of California was the southernmost section of a strait supposedly linking the Pacific with the Gulf of Saint Lawrence. His voyage perpetuated the notion of the Island of California and saw the beginning of a search for the Strait of Anián.

The strait probably took its name from Ania, a Chinese province mentioned in a 1559 edition of Marco Polo's book; it first appears on a map issued by Italian cartographer Giacomo Gastaldi about 1562. Five years later Bolognino Zaltieri issued a map showing a narrow and crooked Strait of Anian separating Asia from the Americas. The strait grew in European imagination as an easy sea lane linking Europe with the residence of Khagan (the Great Khan) in Cathay (northern China).

Cartographers and seamen tried to demonstrate its reality. Sir Francis Drake sought the western entrance in 1579. The Greek pilot Juan de Fuca, sailing from Acapulco (in Mexico) under the flag of the Spanish crown, claimed he had sailed the strait from the Pacific to the North Sea and back in 1592. The Spaniard Bartholomew de Fonte claimed to have sailed from Hudson Bay to the Pacific via the strait in 1640.

=== Northern Atlantic ===
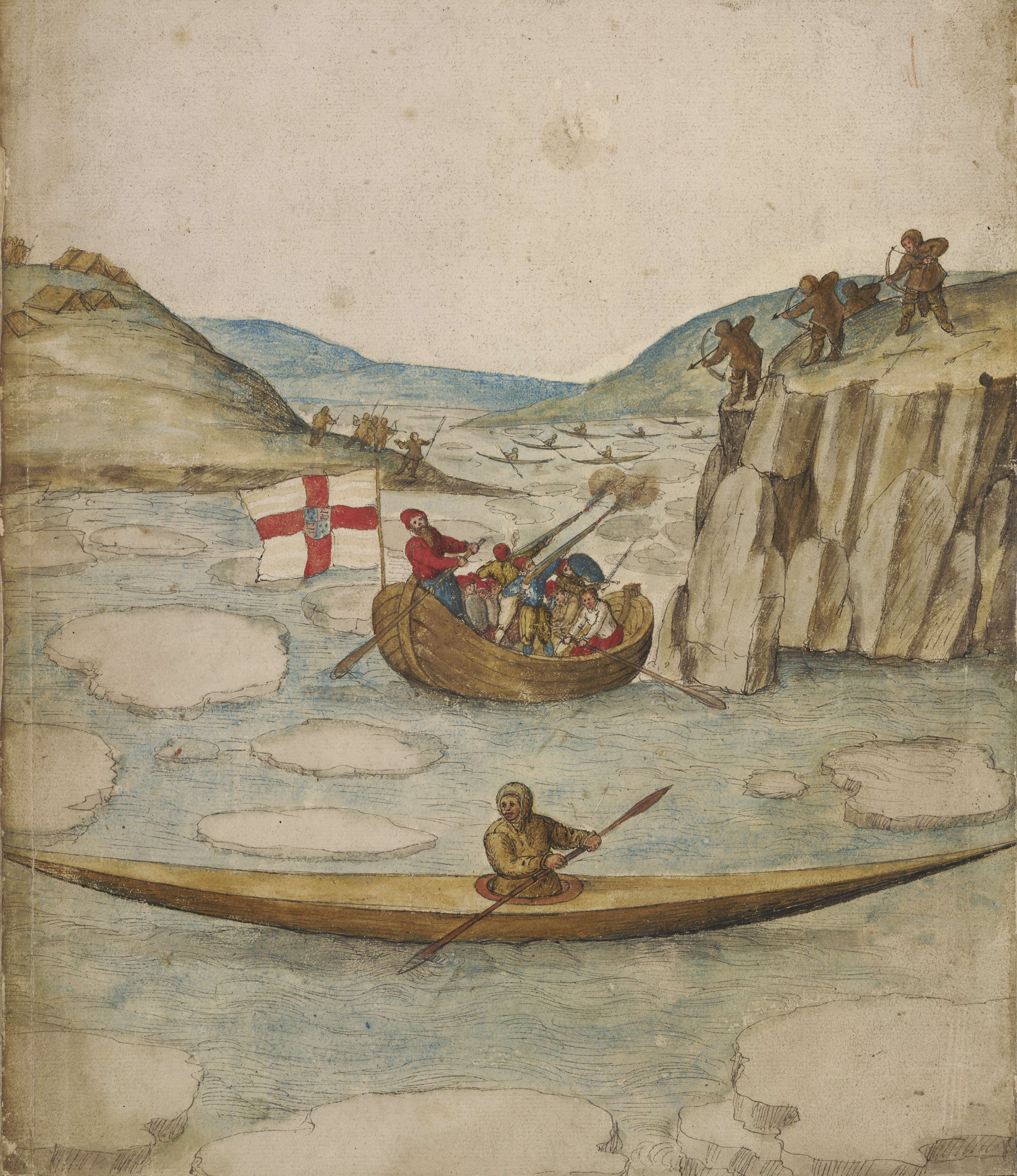
Skirmish between Martin Frobisher's men and Inuit, c. 1577–78

The first recorded attempt to discover the Northwest Passage was the east–west voyage of John Cabot in 1497, sent by Henry VII in search of a direct route to the Orient. In 1524, Charles V sent Estêvão Gomes to find a northern Atlantic passage to the Spice Islands. An English expedition was launched in 1576 by Martin Frobisher, who took three trips west to what is now the Canadian Arctic in order to find the passage. Frobisher Bay, which he first charted, is named after him.

As part of another expedition, in July 1583 Sir Humphrey Gilbert, who had written a treatise on the discovery of the passage and was a backer of Frobisher, claimed the territory of Newfoundland for the English crown. On August 8, 1585, the English explorer John Davis entered Cumberland Sound, Baffin Island.

The major rivers on the east coast were also explored in case they could lead to a transcontinental passage. Jacques Cartier's explorations of the Saint Lawrence River in 1535 were initiated in hope of finding a way through the continent. Cartier became persuaded that the St. Lawrence was the Passage; when he found the way blocked by rapids at what is now Montreal, he was so certain that these rapids were all that was keeping him from China (in French, la Chine), that he named the rapids for China. Samuel de Champlain renamed them Sault Saint-Louis in 1611, but the name was changed to Lachine Rapids in the mid-19th century.

In 1602, George Weymouth became the first European to explore what would later be called Hudson Strait when he sailed Discovery 300 nautical miles (560 km) into the Strait. Weymouth's expedition to find the Northwest Passage was funded jointly by the British East India Company and the Muscovy Company. Discovery was the same ship used by Henry Hudson on his final voyage.

John Knight, employed by the British East India Company and the Muscovy Company, set out in 1606 to follow up on Weymouth's discoveries and find the Northwest Passage. After his ship ran aground and was nearly crushed by ice, Knight disappeared while searching for a better anchorage.

In 1609, Henry Hudson sailed up what is now called the Hudson River in search of the Passage; encouraged by the saltiness of the water in the estuary, he reached present-day Albany, New York, before giving up. On September 14, 1609, Hudson entered the Tappan Zee while sailing upstream from New York Harbor. At first, Hudson believed the widening of the river indicated that he had found the Northwest Passage. He proceeded upstream as far as present-day Troy before concluding that no such strait existed there. He later explored the Arctic and Hudson Bay.

In 1611, while in James Bay, Hudson's crew mutinied. They set Hudson and his teenage son John, along with seven sick, infirm, or loyal crewmen, adrift in a small open boat. He was never seen again. The only account is by one of the mutineers, Abacuk Pricket.

A mission was sent out in 1612, again in Discovery, commanded by Sir Thomas Button to find Henry Hudson and continue through the Northwest Passage. After failing to find Hudson, and exploring the west coast of Hudson Bay, Button returned home due to illness in the crew. In 1614, William Gibbons attempted to find the Passage, but was turned back by ice. The next year, 1615, Robert Bylot, a survivor of Hudson's crew, returned to Hudson Strait in Discovery, but was turned back by ice. Bylot tried again in 1616 with William Baffin. They sailed as far as Lancaster Sound and reached 77°45′ North latitude, a record which stood for 236 years, before being blocked by ice.

On May 9, 1619, under the auspices of King Christian IV of Denmark–Norway, Jens Munk set out with 65 men and the king's two ships, Einhörningen (Unicorn), a small frigate, and Lamprenen (Lamprey), a sloop, which were outfitted under his own supervision. His mission was to discover the Northwest Passage to the Indies and China. Munk penetrated Davis Strait as far north as 69°, found Frobisher Bay, and then spent almost a month fighting his way through Hudson Strait. In September 1619, he found the entrance to Hudson Bay and spent the winter near the mouth of the Churchill River. Cold, famine, and scurvy destroyed so many of his men that only he and two other men survived. With these men, he sailed for home with Lamprey on July 16, 1620, reaching Bergen, Norway, on September 20, 1620.

René-Robert Cavelier, Sieur de La Salle built the sailing ship, Le Griffon, in his quest to find the Northwest Passage via the upper Great Lakes. He made his way across Lake Erie and Lake Huron, making port on Mackinac Island before landing at Washington Island at the mouth of Green Bay to trade for furs with Pottawatomie Indians. La Salle stayed behind while the ship sailed back to Mackinac with the furs. Le Griffon disappeared in 1679 on the return trip of her maiden voyage. In the spring of 1682, La Salle made his famous voyage down the Mississippi River to the Gulf of Mexico. La Salle led an expedition from France in 1684 to establish a French colony on the Gulf of Mexico. He was murdered by his followers in 1687.

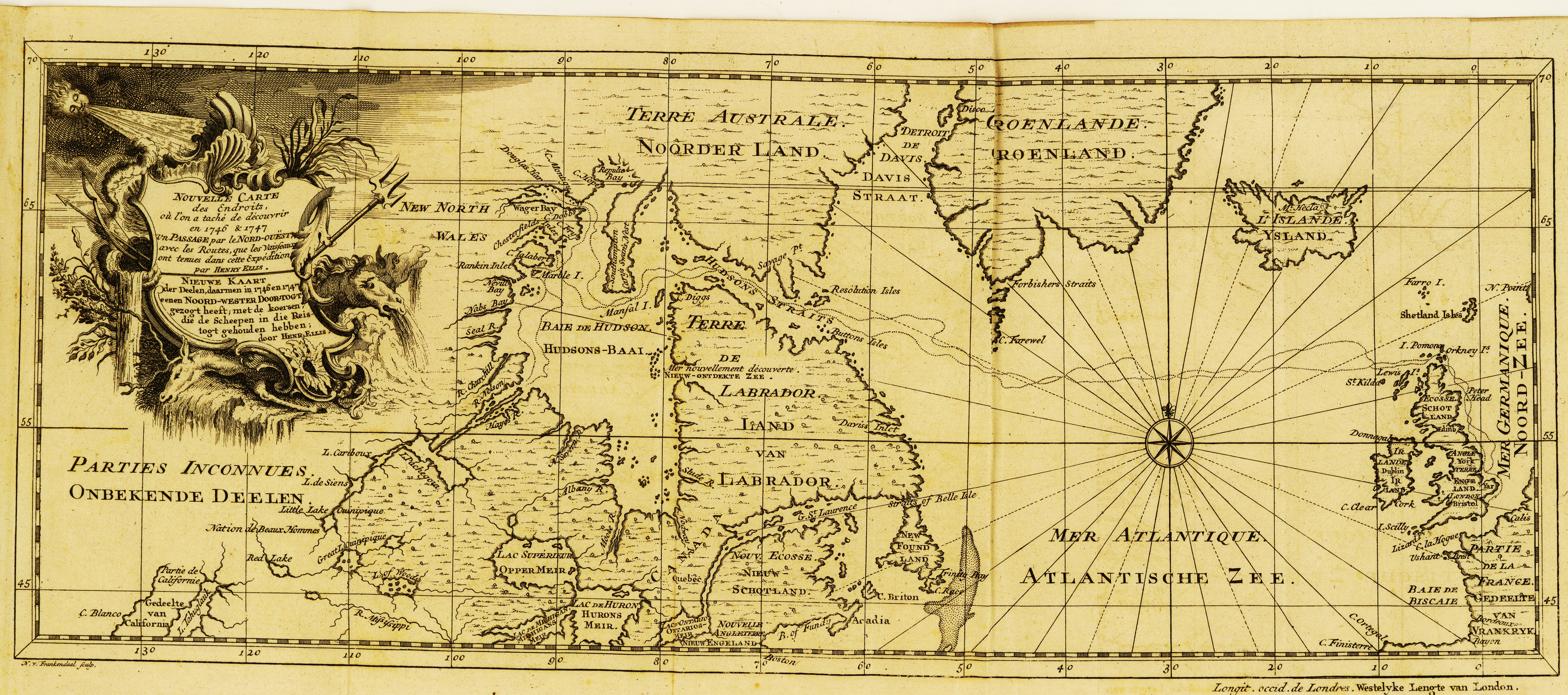
Ellis expedition: Voyage to Hudson Bay, in 1746 and 1747

Henry Ellis, born in Ireland, was part of a company aiming to discover the Northwest Passage in May 1746. After the difficult extinction of a fire on board the ship, he sailed to Greenland, where he traded goods with the Inuit on July 8, 1746. He crossed to the town of Fort Nelson and spent the summer on the Hayes River. He renewed his efforts in June 1747, without success, before returning to England.

In 1772, the English fur trader Samuel Hearne travelled overland northwest from Hudson Bay to the Arctic Ocean, thereby proving that there was no strait connecting Hudson Bay to the Pacific Ocean.

=== Northern Pacific ===
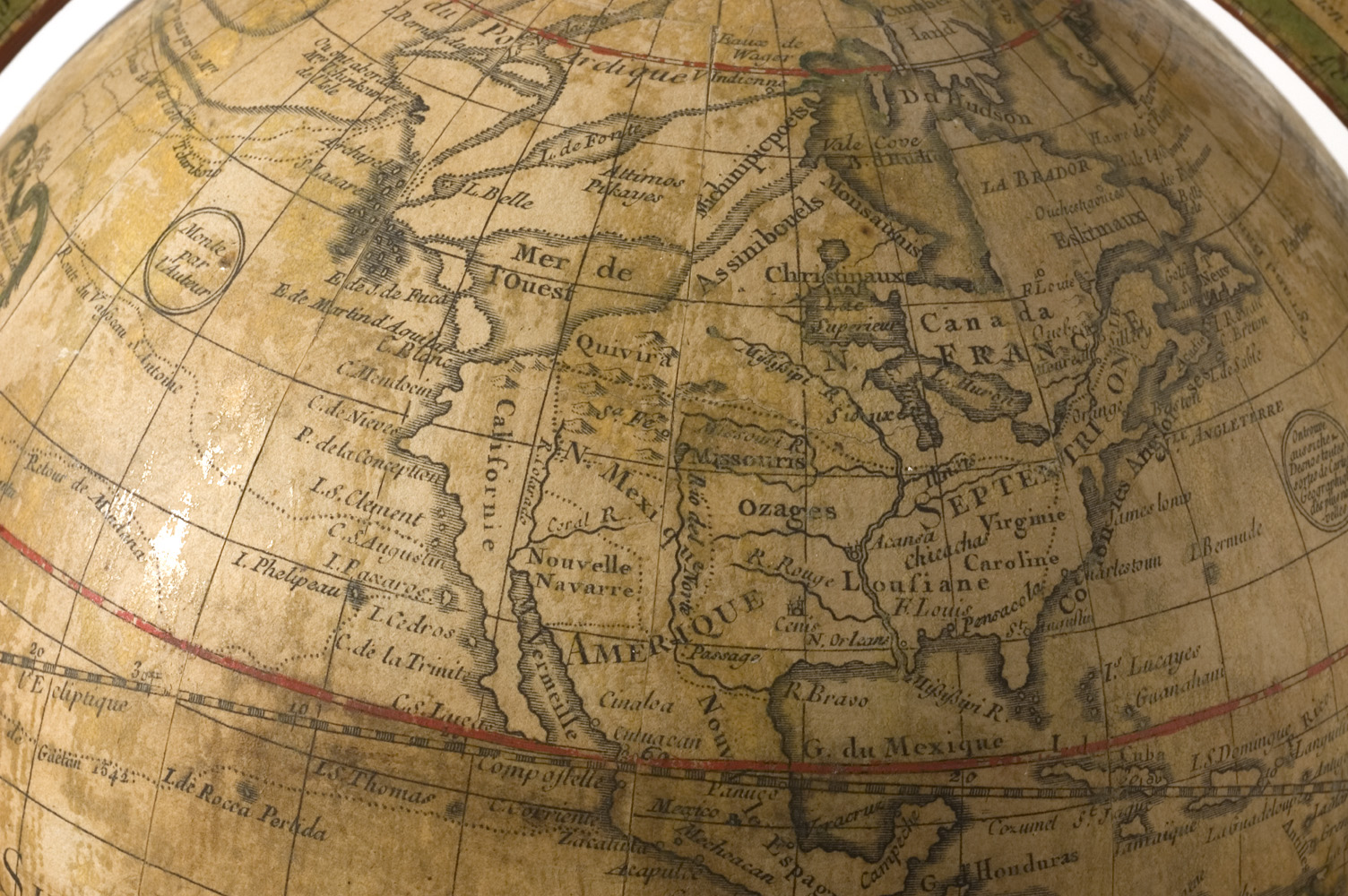
1765 globe by Guillaume Delisle, showing a fictional Northwest Passage

Most Northwest Passage expeditions originated in Europe or on the east coast of North America, seeking to traverse the Passage in the westbound direction. Some progress was made in exploring the western reaches of the imagined passage.

In 1728 Vitus Bering, a Danish-born Russian navy officer, used the strait first discovered by Semyon Dezhnyov in 1648 but later accredited to and named after Bering (the Bering Strait). He concluded that North America and Russia were separate land masses by sailing between them. In 1741 with Lieutenant Aleksei Chirikov, he explored seeking further lands beyond Siberia. While they were separated, Chirikov discovered several of the Aleutian Islands while Bering charted the Alaskan region. His ship was wrecked off the Kamchatka Peninsula, as many of his crew were disabled by scurvy.

The Spanish made several voyages to the northwest coast of North America during the late 18th century. Determining whether a Northwest Passage existed was one of the motives for their efforts. Among the voyages that involved careful searches for a Passage included the 1775 and 1779 voyages of Juan Francisco de la Bodega y Quadra. The journal of Francisco Antonio Mourelle, who served as Quadra's second in command in 1775, fell into English hands. It was translated and published in London, stimulating exploration.

Captain James Cook made use of the journal during his explorations of the region. In 1791 Alessandro Malaspina sailed to Yakutat Bay, Alaska, which was rumoured to be a Passage. In 1790 and 1791 Francisco de Eliza led several exploring voyages into the Strait of Juan de Fuca, searching for a possible Northwest Passage and finding the Strait of Georgia. To fully explore this new inland sea, an expedition under Dionisio Alcalá Galiano was sent in 1792. He was explicitly ordered to explore all channels that might turn out to be a Northwest Passage.

=== Cook and Vancouver ===
Discovery of Northern Passage Act 1776
- Act of Parliament
- Parliament of Great Britain
- Long title: An Act for giving a publick Reward unto such Person or Persons, being His Majesty's Subject or Subjects, as shall discover a Northern Passage for Vessels by Sea, between the Atlantic and Pacific Oceans; and also unto such as shall first approach, by Sea, within One Degree of the Northern Pole.
- Citation: 16 Geo. 3. c. 6
- Territorial extent: Great Britain

Dates
- Royal assent: 22 December 1775
- Commencement: 26 October 1775 (Note: Start of session.)
- Repealed: 8 May 1818
Other legislation
Repealed by	Discovery of Longitude at Sea, etc. Act 1818
Relates to	Discovery of North-West Passage Act 1744

Status: Repealed

Text of statute as originally enacted

In 1776, Captain James Cook was dispatched by the Admiralty in Great Britain on an expedition to explore the Passage. A 1745 act, when extended in 1775, promised a £20,000 prize for whoever discovered the passage. Initially the Admiralty had wanted Charles Clerke to lead the expedition, with Cook (in retirement following his exploits in the Pacific) acting as a consultant. However, Cook had researched Bering's expeditions, and the Admiralty ultimately placed their faith in the veteran explorer to lead, with Clerke accompanying him.

After journeying through the Pacific, to make an attempt from the west, Cook began at Nootka Sound in April 1778. He headed north along the coastline, charting the lands and searching for the regions sailed by the Russians 40 years previously. The Admiralty's orders had commanded the expedition to ignore all inlets and rivers until they reached a latitude of 65°N. Cook, however, failed to make any progress in sighting a Northwestern Passage.

Various officers on the expedition, including William Bligh, George Vancouver, and John Gore, thought the existence of a route was 'improbable'. Before reaching 65°N they found the coastline pushing them further south, but Gore convinced Cook to sail on into the Cook Inlet in the hope of finding the route. They continued to the limits of the Alaskan peninsula and the start of the 1,200 mi (1,900 km) chain of Aleutian Islands. Despite reaching 70°N, they encountered nothing but icebergs.

From 1792 to 1794, the Vancouver Expedition (led by George Vancouver who had previously accompanied Cook) surveyed in detail all the passages from the Northwest Coast. He confirmed that there was no such passage south of the Bering Strait. This conclusion was supported by the evidence of Alexander MacKenzie, who explored the Arctic and Pacific Oceans in 1793.

=== 19th century ===
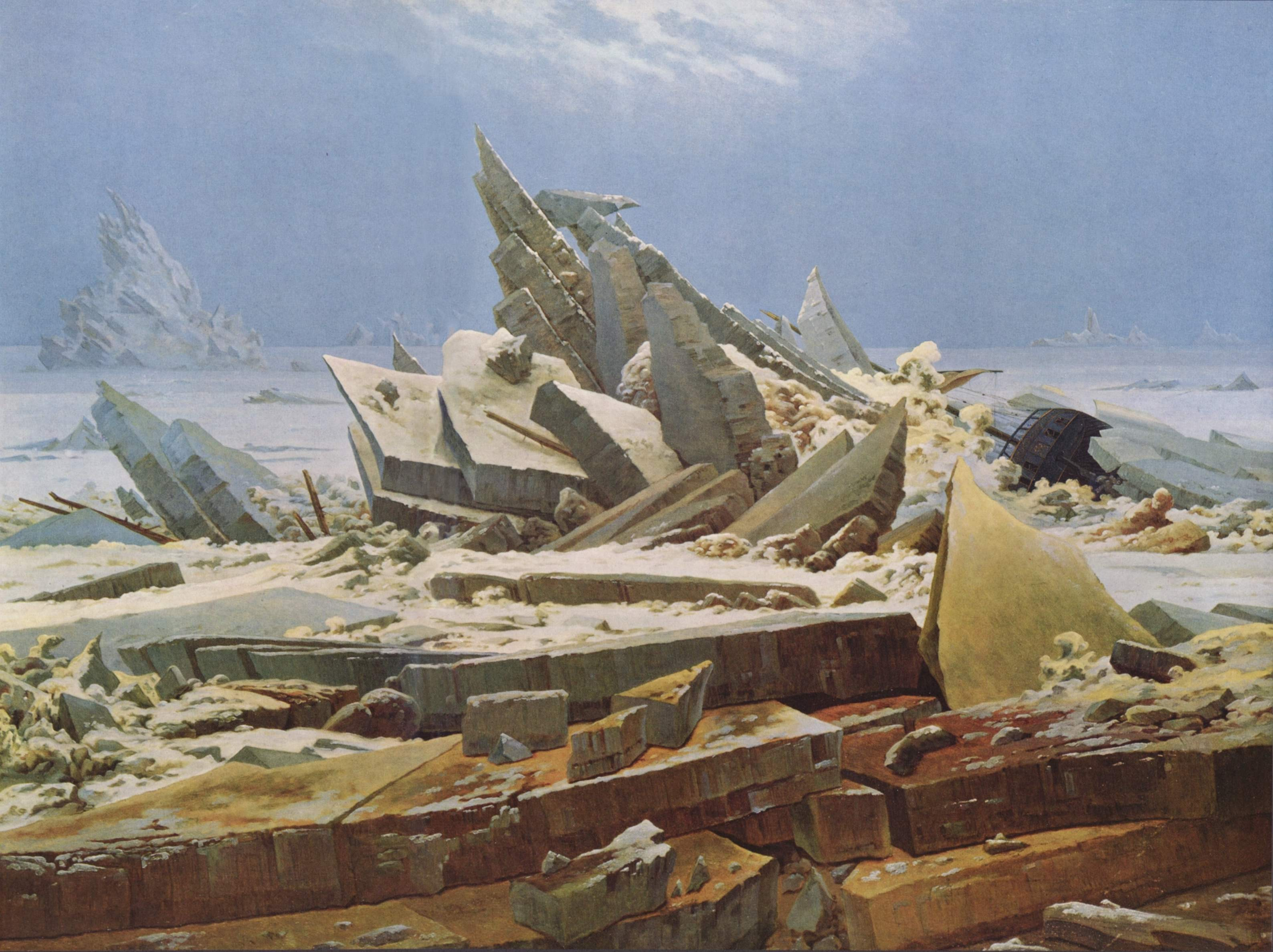
Das Eismeer (The Sea of Ice), 1823–1824, a painting by Caspar David Friedrich showing a shipwreck at right. It was inspired by William Edward Parry's account from his 1819–1820 expedition. Kunsthalle Hamburg, Germany.

In the first half of the 19th century, some parts of the Northwest Passage (north of the Bering Strait) were explored separately by many expeditions, including those by John Ross, Elisha Kent Kane, William Edward Parry, and James Clark Ross; overland expeditions were also led by John Franklin, George Back, Peter Warren Dease, Thomas Simpson, and John Rae. In 1826 Frederick William Beechey explored the north coast of Alaska, discovering Point Barrow.

Sir Robert McClure was credited with the discovery of the Northwest Passage in 1851 when he looked across McClure Strait from Banks Island and viewed Melville Island. However, this strait was not navigable to ships at that time. The only usable route linking the entrances of Lancaster Sound and Dolphin and Union Strait was discovered by John Rae in 1854.

=== Franklin expedition ===
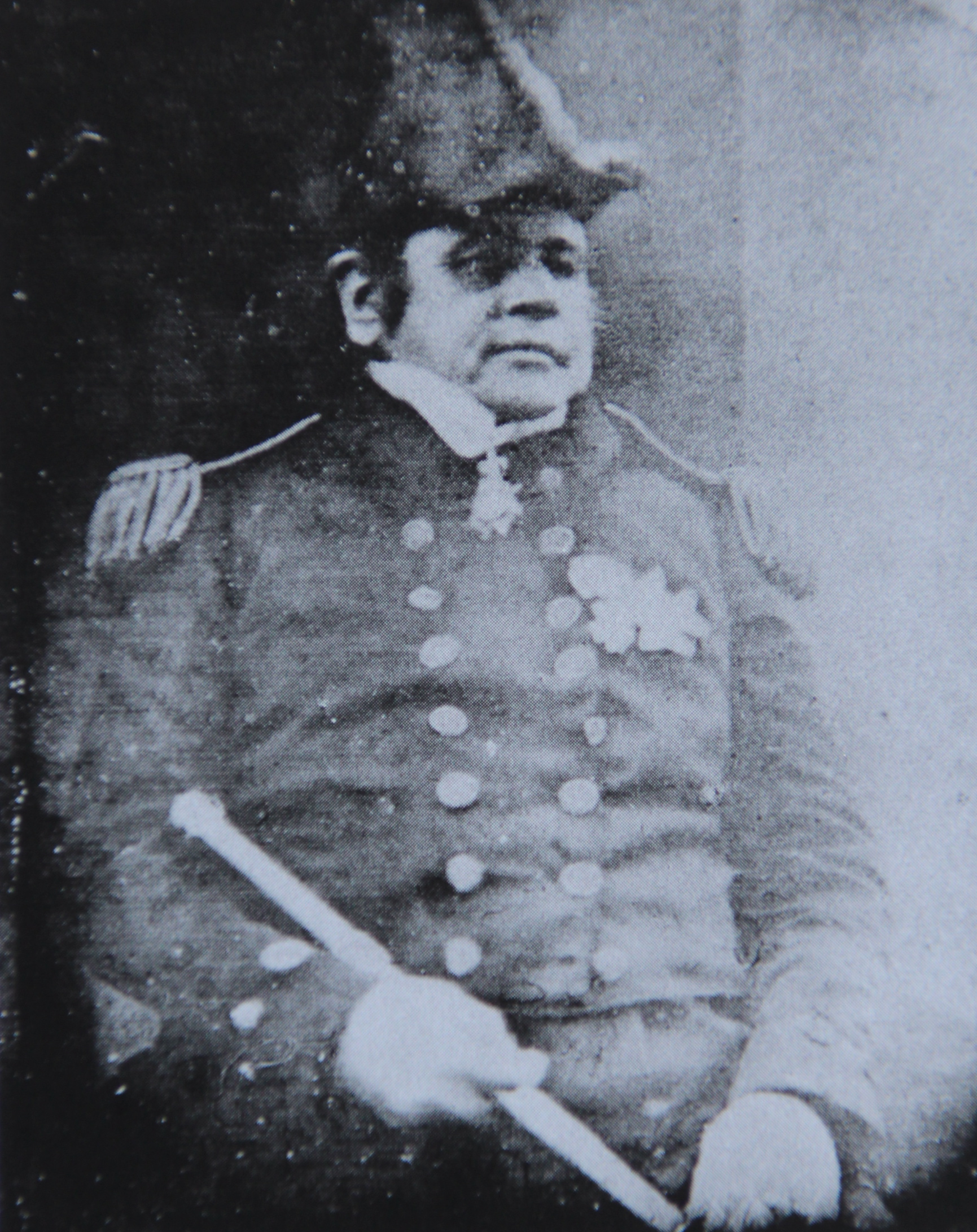
Sir John Franklin, the leader of the lost 1845 expedition

In 1845, a lavishly equipped two-ship expedition led by Sir John Franklin sailed to the Canadian Arctic to chart the last unknown swaths of the Northwest Passage. Confidence was high, as they estimated there was less than 500 km (310 mi) remaining of unexplored Arctic mainland coast. When the ships failed to return, relief expeditions and search parties explored the Canadian Arctic, which resulted in a thorough charting of the region, along with a possible passage. Many artifacts from the expedition were found over the next century and a half, including notes that the ships were ice-locked in 1846 near King William Island, about halfway through the passage, and unable to break free. Records showed Franklin died in 1847 and Captain Francis Crozier took over command. In 1848 the expedition abandoned the two ships and its members tried to escape south across the tundra by sledge. Although some of the crew may have survived into the early 1850s, no evidence has ever been found of any survivors. In 1853, explorer John Rae was told by local Inuit about the disastrous fate of Franklin's expedition, but his reports were not welcomed in Britain on account of his reports of cannibalism amongst the surviving crews.

Starvation, exposure and scurvy all contributed to the men's deaths. In 1981 Owen Beattie, an anthropologist from the University of Alberta, examined remains from sites associated with the expedition. This led to further investigations and the examination of tissue and bone from the frozen bodies of three seamen, John Torrington, William Braine and John Hartnell, exhumed from the permafrost of Beechey Island. Laboratory tests revealed high concentrations of lead in all three (the expedition carried 8,000 tins of food sealed with a lead-based solder). Another researcher has suggested botulism caused deaths among crew members. Evidence from 1996, that confirms reports first made by John Rae in 1854 based on Inuit accounts, suggests that the last of the crew may have resorted to cannibalism of deceased members in an effort to survive.

=== McClure expedition ===
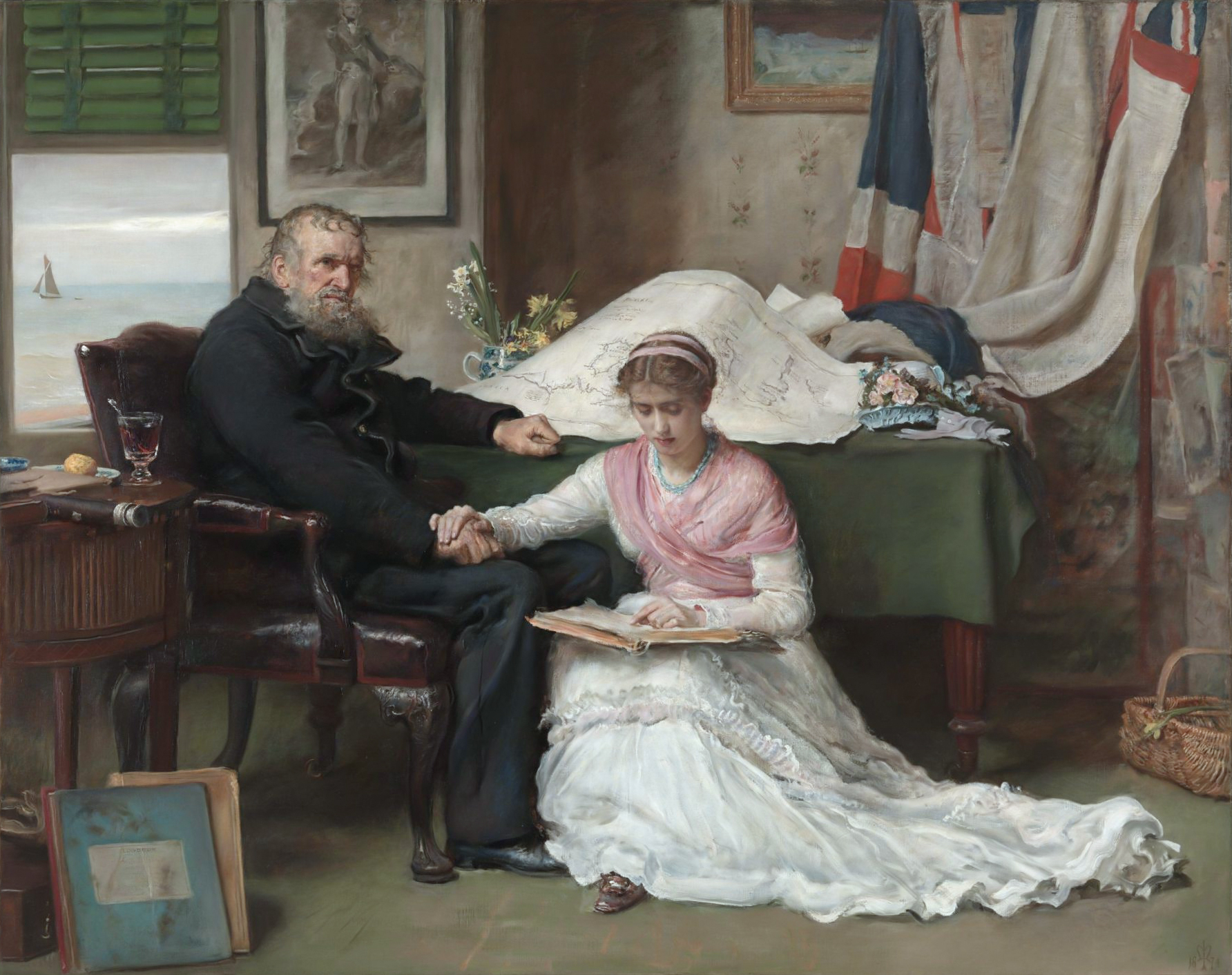
The North-West Passage (1874) by John Everett Millais, representing British frustration at the failure to conquer the passage (Tate Britain)

During the search for Franklin, Commander Robert McClure and his crew in HMS Investigator traversed the Northwest Passage from west to east in the years 1850 to 1854, partly by ship and partly by sledge. McClure started out from England in December 1849, sailed the Atlantic Ocean south to Cape Horn and entered the Pacific Ocean. He sailed the Pacific north and passed through the Bering Strait, turning east at that point and reaching Banks Island.

McClure's ship was trapped in the ice for three winters near Banks Island, at the western end of Viscount Melville Sound. Finally McClure and his crew—who were by that time dying of starvation—were found by searchers who had travelled by sledge over the ice from a ship of Sir Edward Belcher's expedition. They rescued McClure and his crew, returning with them to Belcher's ships, which had entered the Sound from the east. McClure and his crew returned to England in 1854 on one of Belcher's ships. They were the first people known to circumnavigate the Americas and to discover and transit the Northwest Passage, albeit by ship and by sledge over the ice. (Both McClure and his ship were found by a party from HMS Resolute, one of Belcher's ships, so his sledge journey was relatively short.)

This was an astonishing feat for that day and age, and McClure was knighted and promoted in rank. (He was made rear-admiral in 1867.) Both he and his crew also shared £10,000 awarded them by the British Parliament. In July 2010 Canadian archaeologists found his ship, HMS Investigator, fairly intact but sunk about 8 m (26 ft) below the surface.

=== John Rae ===
The expeditions by Franklin and McClure were in the tradition of British exploration: well-funded ship expeditions using modern technology, and usually including British Naval personnel. By contrast, John Rae was an employee of the Hudson's Bay Company, which operated a far-flung trade network and drove exploration of the Canadian North. They adopted a pragmatic approach and tended to be land-based. While Franklin and McClure tried to explore the passage by sea, Rae explored by land. He used dog sleds and techniques of surviving in the environment which he had learned from the native Inuit. The Franklin and McClure expeditions each employed hundreds of personnel and multiple ships. John Rae's expeditions included fewer than ten people and succeeded. Rae was also the explorer with the best safety record, having lost only one man in years of traversing Arctic lands. In 1854, Rae returned to the cities with information from the Inuit about the disastrous fate of the Franklin expedition.

=== Amundsen expedition ===
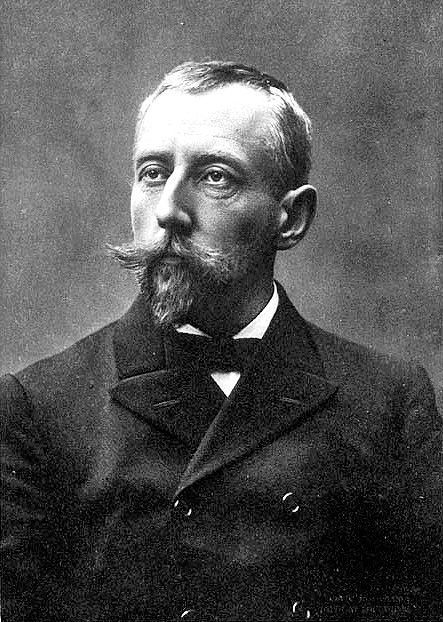
Norwegian polar explorer Roald Amundsen was the first to sail through the Northwest Passage in 1903–1906.

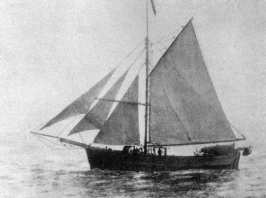
Amundsen's Gjøa was the first vessel to transit the passage.

The first explorer to traverse the Northwest Passage solely by ship was the Norwegian explorer Roald Amundsen. In a three-year journey between 1903 and 1906, Amundsen explored the passage with a crew of six. Amundsen, who had sailed to escape creditors seeking to stop the expedition, completed the voyage in the converted 45 net register tonnage (4,500 cu ft or 130 m^{3}) herring boat Gjøa. Gjøa was much smaller than vessels used by other Arctic expeditions and had a shallow draft. Amundsen intended to hug the shore, live off the limited resources of the land and sea through which he was to travel, and had determined that he needed to have a tiny crew to make this work. (Trying to support much larger crews had contributed to the catastrophic failure of John Franklin's expedition fifty years previously, losing two ships and their crews). The ship's shallow draft was intended to help her traverse the shoals of the Arctic straits.

Amundsen set out from Kristiania (Oslo) in June 1903 and was west of the Boothia Peninsula by late September. Gjøa was put into a natural harbour on the south shore of King William Island; by October 3 she was iced in. There the expedition remained for nearly two years, with the expedition members learning from the local Inuit and undertaking measurements to determine the location of the North Magnetic Pole. The harbour, now known as Gjoa Haven, later developed as the only permanent settlement on the island.

After completing the Northwest Passage portion of this trip and having anchored near Herschel Island, Amundsen skied 800 kilometres (500 mi) to the city of Eagle, Alaska. He sent a telegram announcing his success and skied the return 800 kilometres (500 mi) to rejoin his companions. Although his chosen east–west route, via the Rae Strait, contained young ice and thus was navigable, some of the waterways were extremely shallow (3 ft (0.91 m) deep), making the route commercially impractical.

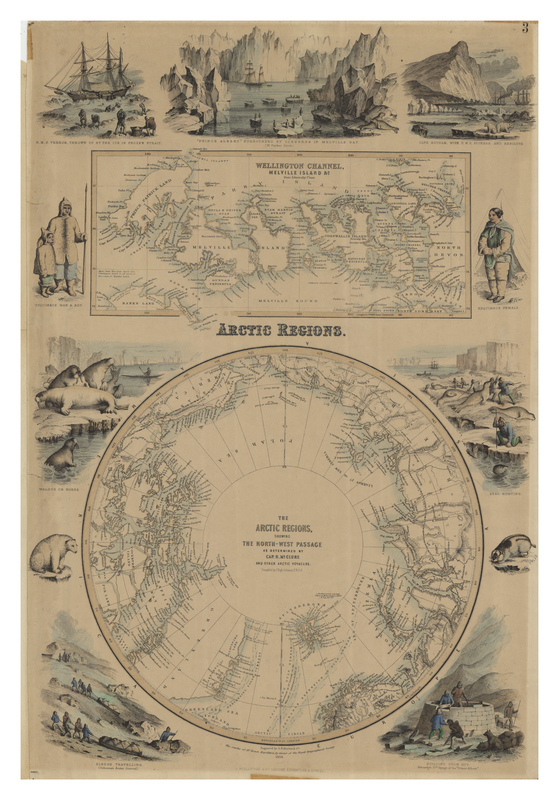
Two maps of arctic regions published in 1856 on a single sheet as part of The Royal Illustrated Atlas of Modern Geography

=== Later expeditions ===
The first traversal of the Northwest Passage via dog sled was accomplished by Greenlander Knud Rasmussen while on the Fifth Thule Expedition (1921–1924). Rasmussen and two Greenland Inuit travelled from the Atlantic to the Pacific over the course of 16 months via dog sled.

Canadian Royal Canadian Mounted Police officer Henry Larsen was the second to sail the passage, crossing west to east, leaving Vancouver on June 23, 1940, and arriving at Halifax on October 11, 1942. More than once on this trip, he was uncertain whether St. Roch, a Royal Canadian Mounted Police "ice-fortified" schooner, would survive the pressures of the sea ice. At one point, Larsen wondered "if we had come this far only to be crushed like a nut on a shoal and then buried by the ice." The ship and all but one of her crew survived the winter on Boothia Peninsula. Each of the men on the trip was awarded a medal by Canada's sovereign, King George VI, in recognition of this feat of Arctic navigation.

Later in 1944, Larsen's return trip was far more swift than his first. He made the trip in 86 days to sail back from Halifax, Nova Scotia, to Vancouver, British Columbia. He set a record for traversing the route in a single season. The ship, after extensive upgrades, followed a more northerly, partially uncharted route.

In 1954, HMCS Labrador completed the east-to-west transit, under the command of Captain O.C.S. Robertson, conducting hydrographic soundings along the route. She was the first warship (and the first deep draft ship) to transit the Northwest Passage and the first warship to circumnavigate North America. In 1956, HMCS Labrador again completed the east-to-west transit, this time under the command of Captain T.C. Pullen.

On July 1, 1957, the United States Coast Guard Cutter Storis departed in company with USCGC Bramble and USCGC Spar to search for a deep-draft channel through the Arctic Ocean and to collect hydrographic information. The US Coast Guard Squadron was escorted through Bellot Strait and the Eastern Arctic by HMCS Labrador. Upon her return to Greenland waters, Storis became the first U.S.-registered vessel to circumnavigate North America. Shortly after her return in late 1957, she was reassigned to her new home port of Kodiak, Alaska.

In 1960, USS Seadragon completed the first submarine transit of the Northwest Passage, heading east-to-west.

In 1969, SS Manhattan made the passage, accompanied by the Canadian icebreakers CCGS John A. Macdonald and CCGS Louis S. St-Laurent. The U.S. Coast Guard icebreakers Northwind and Staten Island also sailed in support of the expedition.

Manhattan was a specially reinforced supertanker sent to test the viability of the passage for the transport of oil. While Manhattan succeeded, the route was deemed not to be cost-effective. The United States built the Alaska Pipeline instead.

In June 1977, sailor Willy de Roos left Belgium to attempt the Northwest Passage in his 13.8 m (45 ft) steel yacht Williwaw. He reached the Bering Strait in September and after a stopover in Victoria, British Columbia, went on to round Cape Horn and sail back to Belgium, thus being the first sailor to circumnavigate the Americas entirely by ship.

In 1981 as part of the Transglobe Expedition, Ranulph Fiennes and Charles R. Burton completed the Northwest Passage. They left Tuktoyaktuk on July 26, 1981, in the 18-foot (5.5 m) open Boston Whaler and reached Tanquary Fiord on August 31, 1981. Their journey was the first open-boat transit from west to east and covered around 3,000 miles (4,800 km; 2,600 nmi), taking a route through Dolphin and Union Strait following the south coast of Victoria and King William islands, north to Resolute Bay via Franklin Strait and Peel Sound, around the south and east coasts of Devon Island, through Hell Gate and across Norwegian Bay to Eureka, Greely Bay and the head of Tanquary Fiord. Once they reached Tanquary Fiord, they had to trek 150 miles (240 km) via Lake Hazen to Alert before setting up their winter base camp.

In 1984, the commercial passenger vessel MV Explorer (which sank in the Antarctic Ocean in 2007) became the first cruise ship to navigate the Northwest Passage.

In July 1986, Jeff MacInnis and Mike Beedell set out on an 18-foot (5.5 m) catamaran called Perception on a 100-day sail, west to east, through the Northwest Passage. This pair was the first to sail the passage, although they had the benefit of doing so over a couple of summers.

In July 1986, David Scott Cowper set out from England in a 12.8-metre (42 ft) lifeboat named Mabel El Holland, and survived three Arctic winters in the Northwest Passage before reaching the Bering Strait in August 1989. He continued around the world via the Cape of Good Hope to return to England on September 24, 1990. His was the first vessel to circumnavigate the world via the Northwest Passage.

On July 1, 2000, the Royal Canadian Mounted Police patrol vessel Nadon, having assumed the name St Roch II, departed Vancouver on a "Voyage of Rediscovery." Nadon's mission was to circumnavigate North America via the Northwest Passage and the Panama Canal, recreating the epic voyage of her predecessor, St. Roch. The 22,000-mile (35,000 km) Voyage of Rediscovery was intended to raise awareness concerning St. Roch and kick off the fund-raising efforts necessary to ensure the continued preservation of St. Roch. The voyage was organized by the Vancouver Maritime Museum and supported by a variety of corporate sponsors and agencies of the Canadian government. Nadon is an aluminum, catamaran-hulled, high-speed patrol vessel. To make the voyage possible, she was escorted and supported by the Canadian Coast Guard icebreaker Simon Fraser. The Coast Guard vessel was chartered by the Voyage of Rediscovery and crewed by volunteers. Throughout the voyage, she provided a variety of necessary services, including provisions and spares, fuel and water, helicopter facilities, and ice escort; she also conducted oceanographic research during the voyage. The Voyage of Rediscovery was completed in five and a half months, with Nadon reaching Vancouver on December 16, 2000.

On September 1, 2001, Northabout, an 14.3-metre (47 ft) aluminium sailboat with diesel engine, built and captained by Jarlath Cunnane, completed the Northwest Passage east-to-west from Ireland to the Bering Strait. The voyage from the Atlantic to the Pacific was completed in 24 days. Cunnane cruised in Northabout in Canada for two years before returning to Ireland in 2005 via the Northeast Passage; he completed the first east-to-west circumnavigation of the pole by a single sailboat. The Northeast Passage return along the coast of Russia was slower, starting in 2004, requiring an ice stop and winter over in Khatanga, Siberia. He returned to Ireland via the Norwegian coast in October 2005. On January 18, 2006, the Cruising Club of America awarded Jarlath Cunnane their Blue Water Medal, an award for "meritorious seamanship and adventure upon the sea displayed by amateur sailors of all nationalities."

On July 18, 2003, a father-and-son team, Richard and Andrew Wood, with Zoe Birchenough, sailed the yacht Norwegian Blue into the Bering Strait. Two months later she sailed into the Davis Strait to become the first British yacht to transit the Northwest Passage from west to east. She also became the only British vessel to complete the Northwest Passage in one season, as well as the only British sailing yacht to return from there to British waters.

In 2006, a scheduled cruise liner (MS Bremen) successfully ran the Northwest Passage, helped by satellite images telling the location of sea ice.

On May 19, 2007, a French sailor, Sébastien Roubinet, and one other crew member left Anchorage, Alaska, in Babouche, a 7.5-metre (25 ft) ice catamaran designed to sail on water and slide over ice. The goal was to navigate west to east through the Northwest Passage by sail only. Following a journey of more than 7,200 km (4,474 mi), Roubinet reached Greenland on September 9, 2007, thereby completing the first Northwest Passage voyage made in one season without engine.

Northwest Passage Drive Expedition (NWPDX) (2009–2011)

In April 2009, planetary scientist Pascal Lee and a team of four on the Northwest Passage Drive Expedition drove the HMP Okarian Humvee rover a record-setting 496 km (308 mi) on sea-ice from Kugluktuk to Cambridge Bay, Nunavut, the longest distance driven on sea-ice in a road vehicle. The HMP Okarian was being ferried from the North American mainland to the Haughton–Mars Project (HMP) Research Station on Devon Island, where it would be used as a simulator of future pressurized rovers for astronauts on the Moon and Mars. The HMP Okarian was eventually flown from Cambridge Bay to Resolute Bay in May 2009, and then driven again on sea-ice by Lee and a team of five from Resolute to the West coast of Devon Island in May 2010. The HMP Okarian reached the HMP Research Station in July 2011. The Northwest Passage Drive Expedition is captured in the motion picture documentary film Passage To Mars (2016).

In 2009, sea ice conditions were such that at least nine small vessels and two cruise ships completed the transit of the Northwest Passage. These trips included one by Eric Forsyth on board the 42-foot (13 m) Westsail sailboat Fiona, a boat he built in the 1980s. Self-financed, Forsyth, a retired engineer from the Brookhaven National Laboratory, and winner of the Cruising Club of America's Blue Water Medal, sailed the Canadian Archipelago with sailor Joey Waits, airline captain Russ Roberts and carpenter David Wilson. After successfully sailing the Passage, the 77-year-old Forsyth completed the circumnavigation of North America, returning to his home port on Long Island, New York.

Cameron Dueck and his crew aboard the 40-foot (12 m) sailing yacht Silent Sound also transited in the summer of 2009. Their voyage began in Victoria, BC, on June 6, and they arrived in Halifax on October 10. Dueck wrote a book about the voyage called The New Northwest Passage.

In August–September 2010, Graeme Kendall (New Zealand) sailed the 41-foot (12 m) Astral Express through the Northwest Passage. He was the first person to sail solo non-stop through the passage. He began in Lancaster Sound on August 27 and ended 12 days later at Point Barrow, Alaska, on September 9. The trip covered 2,300 nautical miles (4,300 km). It was part of a circumnavigation that started and ended in New Zealand.

On September 9, 2010, Bear Grylls and a team of five completed a point-to-point navigation between Pond Inlet and Tuktoyaktuk in the Northwest Territories on a rigid inflatable boat (RIB). The expedition drew attention to how the effects of global warming made this journey possible and raised funds for the Global Angels charity.

In 2011, Australians Chris Bray and Jess Taunton sailed their 8.8-metre (29 ft) junk-rigged yacht, Teleport, through the passage, navigating from Halifax to Cambridge Bay. Teleport Shoal, at 71°19.6610′N 96°41.0320′W, off the Tasmania Islands, commemorates the vessel.

On August 30, 2012 Sailing yacht Billy Budd, 110 feet (34 m), an English SY, successfully completed the Northwest Passage in Nome, Alaska, while sailing a northern route never sailed by a sailing pleasure vessel before. After six cruising seasons in the Arctic (Greenland, Baffin Bay, Devon Island, Kane Basin, Lancaster Sound, Peel Sound, Regent Sound) and four seasons in the South (Antarctic Peninsula, Patagonia, Falkland Islands, South Georgia), SY Billy Budd, owned by and under the command of an Italian sporting enthusiast, Mariacristina Rapisardi. Crewed by Marco Bonzanigo, five Italian friends, one Australian, one Dutch, one South African, and one New Zealander, it sailed through the Northwest Passage. The northernmost route was chosen. Billy Budd sailed through the Parry Channel, Viscount Melville Sound and Prince of Wales Strait, a channel 160 nautical miles (300 km; 180 mi) long and 15 nautical miles (28 km; 17 mi) wide which flows south into the Amundsen Gulf. During the passage Billy Budd – likely a first for a pleasure vessel – anchored in Winter Harbour in Melville Island, the very same site where almost 200 years ago Sir William Parry was blocked by ice and forced to winter.

On August 29, 2012, the Swedish yacht Belzebub II, a 31-foot (9.4 m) fibreglass cutter captained by Canadian Nicolas Peissel, Swede Edvin Buregren and Morgan Peissel, became the first sailboat in history to sail through McClure Strait, part of a journey of achieving the most northerly Northwest Passage. Belzebub II departed Newfoundland following the coast of Greenland to Qaanaaq before tracking the sea ice to Grise Fiord, Canada's most northern community. From there the team continued through Parry Channel into McClure Strait and the Beaufort Sea, tracking the highest latitudes of 2012's record sea ice depletion before completing their Northwest Passage September 14, 2012. The expedition received extensive media coverage, including recognition by former U.S. Vice President Al Gore. The accomplishment is recorded in the Polar Scott Institute's record of Northwest Passage Transits and recognized by the Explorers Club and the Royal Canadian Geographic Society.

At 18:45 GMT on September 18, 2012, Best Explorer, a steel cutter 15.17 metres (49.8 ft), skipper Nanni Acquarone, passing between the two Diomedes, was the first Italian sailboat to complete the Northwest Passage along the classical Amundsen route. Twenty-two Italian amateur sailors took part of the trip, in eight legs from Tromsø, Norway, to King Cove, Alaska, totalling 8,200 nautical miles (15,200 km; 9,400 mi). Later in 2019 Best Explorer skippered again by Nanni Acquarone became the first Italian sailboat to circumnavigate the Arctic sailing north of Siberia from Petropavlovsk-Kamchatsky to Tromsø and the second ever to do it clockwise.

Setting sail from Nome, Alaska, on August 18, 2012, and reaching Nuuk, Greenland, on September 12, 2012, The World became the largest passenger vessel to transit the Northwest Passage. The ship, carrying 481 passengers, for 26 days and 4,800 nmi (8,900 km; 5,500 mi) at sea, followed in the path of Captain Roald Amundsen. The World's transit of the Northwest Passage was documented by National Geographic photographer Raul Touzon.

In September 2013, MS Nordic Orion became the first commercial bulk carrier to transit the Northwest Passage. She was carrying a cargo of 73,500 short tons (66,700 t) of coking coal from Port Metro Vancouver, Canada, to the Finnish Port of Pori, 15,000 short tons (14,000 t) more than would have been possible via the traditional Panama Canal route. The Northwest Passage shortened the distance by 1,000 nautical miles (1,900 km; 1,200 mi) compared to traditional route via the Panama Canal.

In August and September 2016 a cruise ship was sailed through the Northwest Passage. The ship Crystal Serenity, (with 1,000 passengers, and 600 crew) left Seward, Alaska, used Amundsen's route and reached New York on September 17. Tickets for the 32-day trip started at $22,000 and were quickly sold out. The trip was repeated in 2017. In 2017 33 vessels made a complete transit, breaking the prior record of 20 in 2012.

In September 2018, sailing yacht Infinity (a 36.6 m ketch) and her 22-person crew successfully sailed through the Northwest Passage. This was part of their mission to plant the flag of Earth on the remaining Arctic ice. Supported by the EarthToday initiative, this voyage was a symbol for future global collaboration against climate change. The flag of Planet Earth was planted on September 21, 2018, the International Day of Peace.

From July to October 2023, the Arctic Cowboys, became the first people to kayak the central portion of the Northwest Passage from Pond Inlet to Cape Bathurst, marking them as the first to navigate the Canadian Archipelago completely self-propelled, meaning no motors or sails were used. Additionally, the team completed the 2,600 km (1,600 mi) expedition in a single season. The expedition was led and organised by West Hansen, along with Jeff Wueste, Mark Agnew, and Eileen Visser. The four travelled in two tandem kayaks. Agnew was awarded European Adventurer of the Year as a result.

== International waters dispute ==
The Canadian government classifies the waters of the Northwest Passage in the Canadian Arctic Archipelago, as internal waters of Canada as per the United Nations Convention on the Law of the Sea and by the precedent in the drawing of baselines for other archipelagos, giving Canada the right to bar transit through these waters. Some maritime nations, notably the United States, claim these waters to be an international strait, where foreign vessels have the right of "transit passage." In such a regime, Canada would have the right to enact fishing and environmental regulation, and fiscal and smuggling laws, as well as laws intended for the safety of shipping, but not the right to close the passage. While Canada is a party to the 1982 convention, the United States has not ratified it.

The dispute between Canada and the United States arose in 1969 with the trip of the U.S. oil tanker SS Manhattan through the Arctic Archipelago. The prospect of more American traffic headed to the Prudhoe Bay Oil Field made the Canadian government realize that political action was required. If the passage's deep waters become completely ice-free in summer months, they will be particularly enticing for supertankers that are too big to pass through the Panama Canal and must otherwise navigate around the tip of South America.

In 1985, the U.S. Coast Guard icebreaker Polar Sea passed through from Greenland to Alaska; the ship submitted to inspection by the Canadian Coast Guard before passing through, but the event infuriated the Canadian public and resulted in a diplomatic incident. The United States government, when asked by a Canadian reporter, indicated that it did not ask for permission as it insists that the waters were an international strait. The Canadian government issued a declaration in 1986 reaffirming Canadian rights to the waters. The United States refused to recognize the Canadian claim. In 1988 the governments of Canada and the United States signed an agreement, "Arctic Cooperation," that resolved the practical issue without solving the sovereignty questions. Under the law of the sea, ships engaged in transit passage are not permitted to engage in research. The agreement states that all U.S. Coast Guard and Navy vessels are engaged in research, and so would require permission from the Government of Canada to pass through.

However, in late 2005, it was reported that U.S. nuclear submarines had travelled unannounced through Canadian Arctic waters, breaking the "Arctic Cooperation" agreement and sparking outrage in Canada. In his first news conference after the 2006 federal election, Prime Minister-designate Stephen Harper contested an earlier statement made by the U.S. ambassador that Arctic waters were international, stating the Canadian government's intention to enforce its sovereignty there. The allegations arose after the U.S. Navy released photographs of USS Charlotte surfaced at the North Pole.

On April 9, 2006, Canada's Joint Task Force (North) declared that the Canadian Forces will no longer refer to the region as the Northwest Passage, but as the Canadian Internal Waters. The declaration came after the successful completion of Operation Nunalivut (Inuktitut for "the land is ours"), which was an expedition into the region by five military patrols.

In 2006 a report prepared by the staff of the Parliamentary Information and Research Service of Canada suggested that because of the September 11 attacks, the United States might be less interested in pursuing the international waterways claim in the interests of having a more secure North American perimeter. This report was based on an earlier paper, The Northwest Passage Shipping Channel: Is Canada's Sovereignty Really Floating Away? by Andrea Charron, given to the 2004 Canadian Defence and Foreign Affairs Institute Symposium. Later in 2006 former United States Ambassador to Canada, Paul Cellucci agreed with this position; however, the succeeding ambassador, David Wilkins, stated that the Northwest Passage was in international waters.

On July 9, 2007, Prime Minister Harper announced the establishment of a deep-water port in the far North. In the press release Harper said, "Canada has a choice when it comes to defending our sovereignty over the Arctic. We either use it or lose it. And make no mistake, this Government intends to use it. Because Canada's Arctic is central to our national identity as a northern nation. It is part of our history. And it represents the tremendous potential of our future."

On July 10, 2007, Rear Admiral Timothy McGee of the U.S. Navy and Rear Admiral Brian Salerno of the U.S. Coast Guard announced that the United States would be increasing its ability to patrol the Arctic.

In June 2019, the U.S. State Department spokesperson Morgan Ortagus said, "We view Canada's claim that the waters of the Northwest Passage are internal waters of Canada as inconsistent with international law," despite historical precedent regarding archipelago baselines.

== Thinning ice cover and the Northwest Passage ==
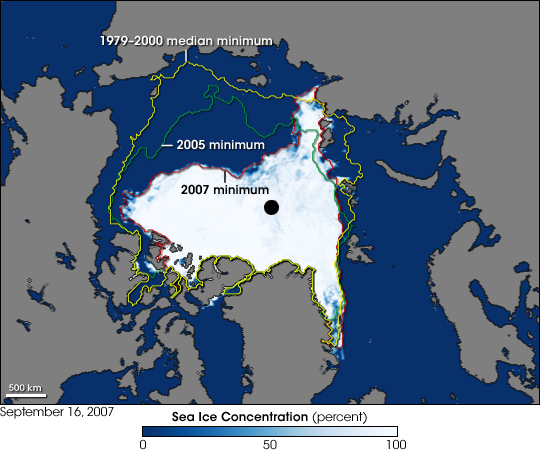
Arctic shrinkage as of 2007 compared to previous years

In summer 2000, two Canadian ships took advantage of thinning summer ice cover on the Arctic Ocean to make the crossing. It is thought that climate change is likely to open the passage for increasing periods, making it potentially attractive as a major shipping route. However, the passage through the Arctic Ocean would require significant investment in escort vessels and staging ports, and it would remain seasonal. Therefore, the route has not become a viable alternative to the Panama Canal.

On September 14, 2007, the European Space Agency (ESA) stated that ice loss that year had opened up the historically impassable passage, setting a new low of ice cover as seen in satellite measurements which went back to 1978. According to the Arctic Climate Impact Assessment, the latter part of the 20th century and the start of the 21st had seen marked shrinkage of ice cover. The extreme loss in 2007 rendered the passage "fully navigable." However, the ESA study was based only on analysis of satellite images and could in practice not confirm anything about the actual navigation of the waters of the passage. ESA suggested the passage would be navigable "during reduced ice cover by multi-year ice pack" (namely sea ice surviving one or more summers) where previously any traverse of the route had to be undertaken during favourable seasonable climatic conditions or by specialist vessels or expeditions. The agency's report speculated that the conditions prevalent in 2007 had shown the passage may "open" sooner than expected. An expedition in May 2008 reported that the passage was not yet continuously navigable even by an icebreaker and not yet ice-free.

Scientists at a meeting of the American Geophysical Union on December 13, 2007, revealed that NASA satellites observing the western Arctic showed a 16% decrease in cloud coverage during the summer of 2007 compared to 2006. This would have the effect of allowing more sunlight to penetrate Earth's atmosphere and warm the Arctic Ocean waters, thus melting sea ice and contributing to opening the Northwest Passage.

However more recent observations show that the annual window for safe shipping in the Arctic ocean is shrinking, apparently because rapid melting of thin sea ice allows thicker multiyear ice to move around and clog ship channels.

In 2006 the cruise liner MS Bremen successfully ran the Northwest Passage, helped by satellite images telling where sea ice was.

On November 28, 2008, the Canadian Coast Guard confirmed the first commercial ship sailed through the Northwest Passage. In September 2008, MV Camilla Desgagnés, owned by Desgagnés Transarctik Inc. and, along with the Arctic Cooperative, part of Nunavut Sealift and Supply Incorporated (NSSI), transported cargo from Montreal to the hamlets of Cambridge Bay, Kugluktuk, Gjoa Haven, and Taloyoak. A member of the crew is reported to have claimed that "there was no ice whatsoever." Shipping from the east was to resume in the fall of 2009. Although sealift is an annual feature of the Canadian Arctic this was the first time that the western communities had been serviced from the east. The western portion of the Canadian Arctic is normally supplied by Northern Transportation Company Limited (NTCL) from Hay River, and the eastern portion by NNSI and NTCL from Churchill and Montreal.

In January 2010, the ongoing reduction in the Arctic sea ice led telecoms cable specialist Kodiak-Kenai Cable to propose the laying of a fibre-optic cable connecting London and Tokyo by way of the Northwest Passage, saying the proposed system would nearly cut in half the time it takes to send messages from the United Kingdom to Japan.

In September 2013, the first large ice-strengthened sea freighter, Nordic Orion, used the passage.

In 2016 a new record was set when the cruise ship Crystal Serenity transited with 1,700 passengers and crew. Crystal Serenity is the largest cruise ship to navigate the Northwest Passage. Starting on August 10, 2016, the ship sailed from Vancouver to New York City, taking 28 days for the journey.

Plans to lay a fibre-optic cable through the passage were revived in 2021, the project is known as Far North Fiber.

=== Transfer of Pacific species to North Atlantic ===
Scientists believe that reduced sea ice in the Northwest Passage has permitted some new species to migrate across the Arctic Ocean. The gray whale Eschrichtius robustus has not been seen in the Atlantic since it was hunted to extinction there in the 18th century, but in May 2010, one such whale turned up in the Mediterranean. Scientists speculated the whale had followed its food sources through the Northwest Passage and simply kept on going.

The plankton species Neodenticula seminae had not been recorded in the Atlantic for 800,000 years. However, it has become increasingly prevalent there. Again, scientists believe that it got there through the reopened Northwest Passage.

In August 2010, two bowhead whales from West Greenland and Alaska respectively, entered the Northwest Passage from opposite directions and spent approximately 10 days in the same area.

== See also ==
- Arctic Bridge
- Arctic exploration
- Discovery of North-West Passage Act 1744
- List of Arctic expeditions
- Northern Sea Route
- Northwest Passage expedition of 1741
- Northwest Passage Territorial Park
- Panama Canal
- Strait of Anián
- Territorial claims in the Arctic

== Sources ==
- Berton, Pierre (1988). The Arctic Grail: The Quest for the North West Passage and the North Pole, 1818–1909. Doubleday Canada. ISBN 978-0-385-67362-4.
- Day, Alan (2006). Historical Dictionary of the Discovery and Exploration of the Northwest Passage. Scarecrow Press. ISBN 978-0-8108-6519-8.
- Griffiths, Franklyn (1987). Politics of the Northwest Passage. Kingston: McGill–Queen's University Press. ISBN 0-7735-0613-6.
- Robinson, J. Lewis (2015) [2013]. "Northwest Passage". The Canadian Encyclopedia (online ed.). Historica Canada. Archived from the original on December 9, 2018.
- Waterman, Jonathan (2001). Arctic Crossing: A Journey Through the Northwest Passage and Inuit Culture. Random House Canada. ISBN 978-0-679-31090-7.
- Williams, Glyndwr (2003). Voyages of Delusion: The Quest for the Northwest Passage. Yale University Press. ISBN 978-0-300-09866-2.
