= Pricket =

Pricket may refer to:

- A male deer in its second year, whose antlers have not yet branched
- A sharp point onto which a candle is placed to keep it erect
- Abacuk Pricket, English seaman of the 16th/17th century
