= Timothy McGee (disambiguation) =

Timothy McGee may refer to:

- Timothy McGee, a fictional character on the television show NCIS
- Tim McGee, professional football player in the American National Football League
- Timothy McGee (USN), retired officer of the United States Navy
