= Beechey Island =

Island and archaeological site in Nunavut, Canada

Native name: Iluvialuit
- Location within Nunavut Location within Canada

Geography
- Location: Northern Canada
- Coordinates: 74°43′N 091°51′W
- Archipelago: Queen Elizabeth Islands; Arctic Archipelago
- Area: 4.6 km^{2} (1.8 sq mi)
- Highest elevation: 198 m (650 ft)
- Highest point: Un-named

Administration
- Canada
- Territory: Nunavut

Demographics
- Population: Uninhabited

National Historic Site of Canada
- Official name: Beechey Island Sites National Historic Sites of Canada
- Designated: 1993

Beechey Island (Inuktitut: Iluvialuit) is an island located in the Arctic Archipelago of Nunavut, Canada, in Wellington Channel. It is separated from the southwest corner of Devon Island by Barrow Strait. Other features include Wellington Channel, Erebus Harbour, and Terror Bay. (Note: Not to be confused with the Terror Bay south of King William Island)

== History ==
The first European visit to the island was in 1819, by Captain William Edward Parry. The island was named by Parry's lieutenant, Frederick William Beechey (1796–1856), after his father, artist William Beechey (1753–1839).

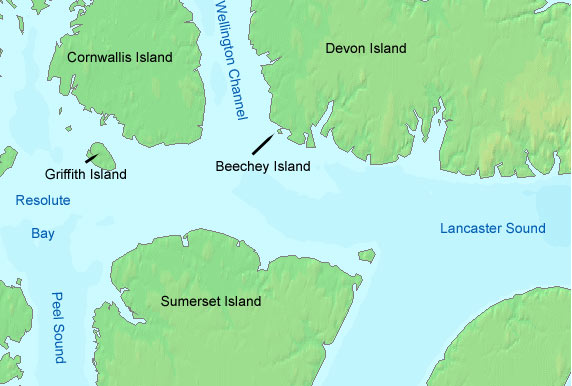
Beechey Island in relation to Cornwallis Island, Devon Island and Somerset Island

It is the site of several very significant events in the history of Arctic exploration. In 1845, the British explorer Sir John Franklin, commanding a new but ill-fated search for the Northwest Passage aboard HMS Erebus and HMS Terror, chose the protected harbour of Beechey Island for his first winter encampment. The site was not rediscovered until 1850, when British and United States search vessels anchored nearby.

In 1850, Edward Belcher used the island as a base. There are memorials to Franklin and other polar explorers and sailors on the island, including to the French naval officer Joseph René Bellot, who died aged 27 falling into the Wellington Channel, northwest of Beechey Island.

In 1854, a building called Northumberland House was erected, using wood salvaged from a wrecked whaling ship. It was stocked with supplies in case any member of the Franklin expedition found their way back to the island.

In 1903, paying respect to Franklin, Norwegian explorer Roald Amundsen stopped at the island at the beginning of his successful voyage through the Northwest Passage.

In 1975, Beechey Island was declared a Territorial Historic Site by the government of the Northwest Territories. Since 1999, it has been part of the newly created Canadian territory of Nunavut.

In 1993, five archaeological sites on Beechey Island and nearby Devon Island (the Franklin wintering camp of 1845–46, Northumberland House, the Devon Island site at Cape Riley, two message cairns, and the HMS Breadalbane National Historic Site) were designated as the Beechey Island Sites National Historic Site of Canada.

== Beechey Island graves ==
Beechey Island is best known for containing three graves of Franklin expedition members, which were first discovered in 1850 by searchers for the lost Franklin expedition. The searchers found a large stone cairn, along with the graves of three of Franklin's crewmen – Petty Officer John Torrington, Royal Marine Private William Braine, and Able Seaman John Hartnell – but no written record nor indication of where Franklin planned to sail the next season.

In 1852, Commander Edward A. Inglefield arrived at Beechey, along with a physician Dr Peter Sutherland. John Hartnell's grave was opened, damaging his coffin, and Hartnell's memorial plaque on the coffin lid was removed. During a later expedition, a searcher named Thomas Morgan died aboard the vessel North Star on May 22, 1854, and was buried alongside the three original Franklin crew members.

In the 1980s, during two separate expeditions to Beechey, Canadian forensic anthropologist Dr. Owen Beattie examined the three bodies and found them (externally) remarkably well-preserved. Autopsies determined that lung disease and lead poisoning were among the probable causes of death; the lead appeared to come from the thousands of lead-soldered tins of provisions with which the Franklin expedition had been supplied (although later studies would suggest that the unique water distillation system used by the ships was the major source of lead poisoning).

Later research, however, found through hair sample comparisons between the Beechey remains and those of expedition assistant surgeon and naturalist Harry Goodsir (who died on the expedition a year later, and would therefore be expected to have yet further exposure, under the lead poisoning hypothesis) that the lead in the three men's remains, while indeed present at high levels now recognized as deleterious, was no higher than Goodsir's, and thus evidently mostly the result of exposure prior to the expedition (due to high everyday lead exposure common in the 19th century), and consequently was unlikely to be solely responsible for their deaths.

In the 1990s, due to the deteriorating condition of the Beechey grave markers, all markers were replaced with bronze memorials.

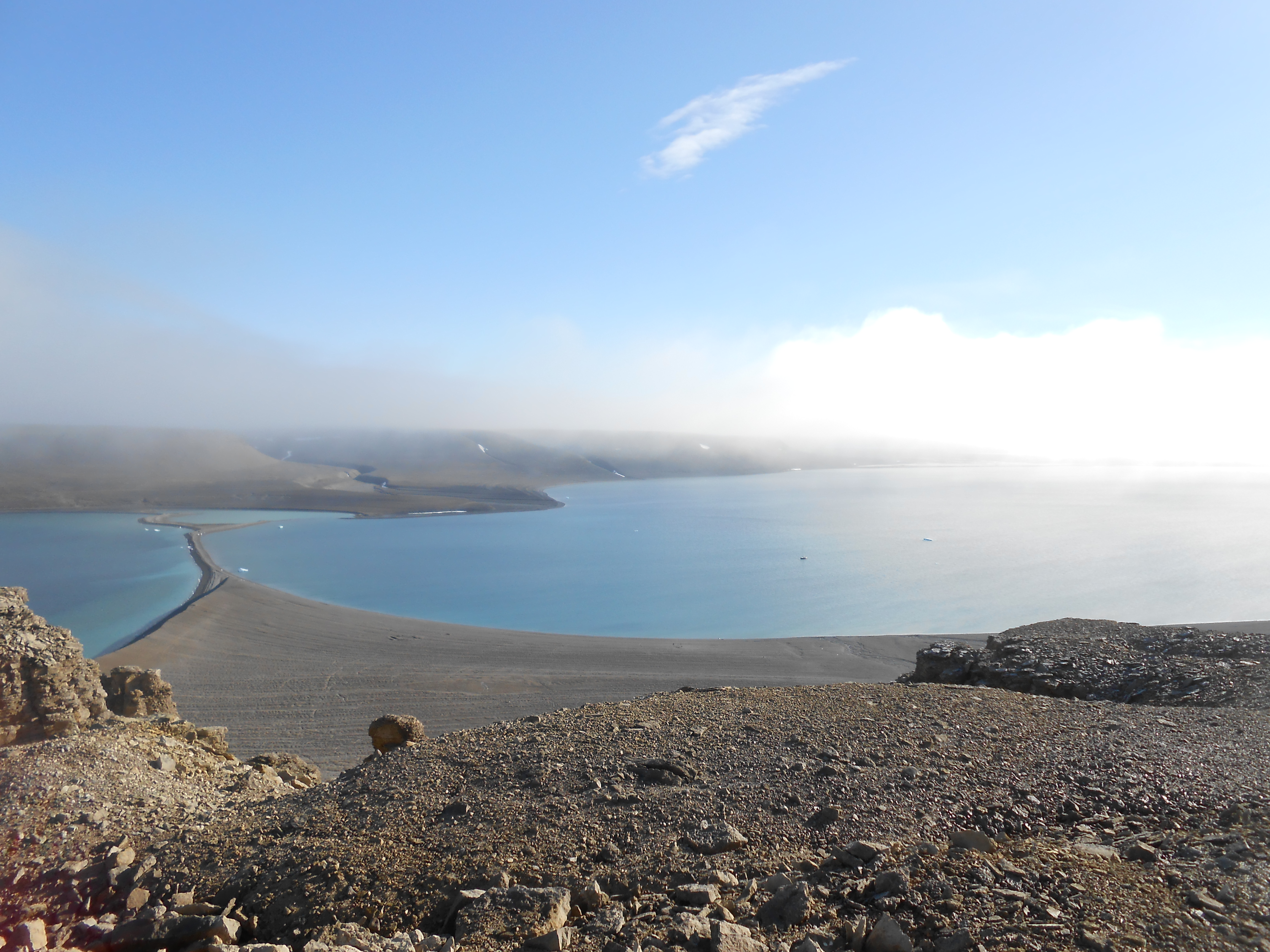
Beechey Island Harbour viewed from northwest summit of Beechey Island, Nunavut, Canada, 2017

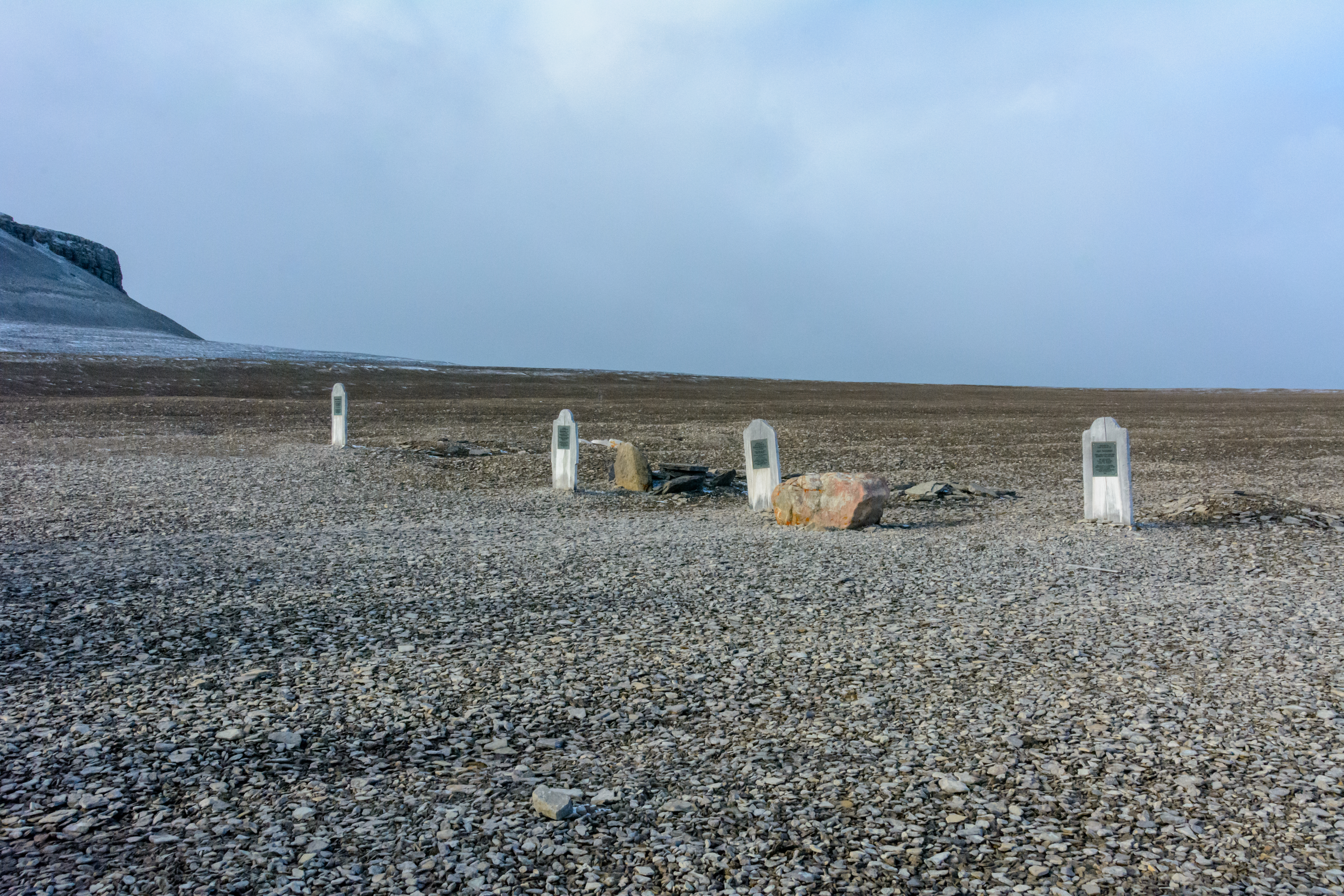
(L-R) Three graves from the lost 1845 Franklin Expedition, and a fourth from a later Franklin search expedition, 2015

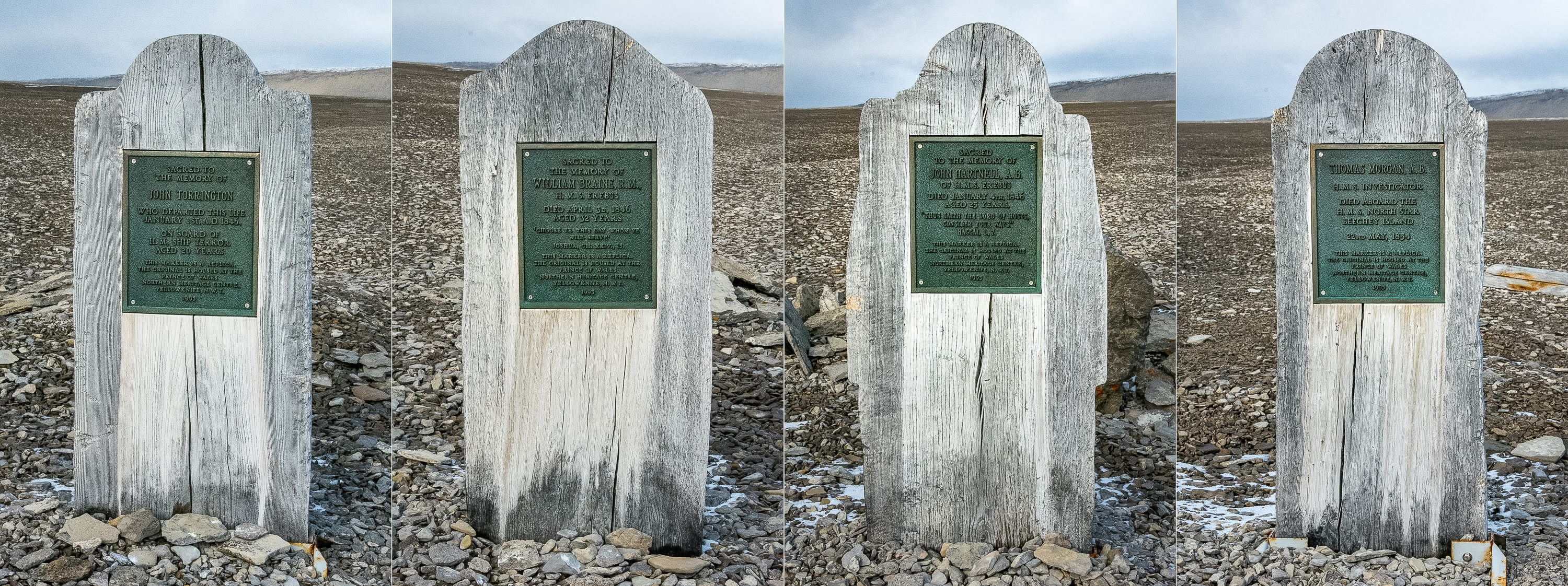
(L-R) The Franklin Camp graves of John Torrington, William Braine, John Hartnell and Thomas Morgan, 2015

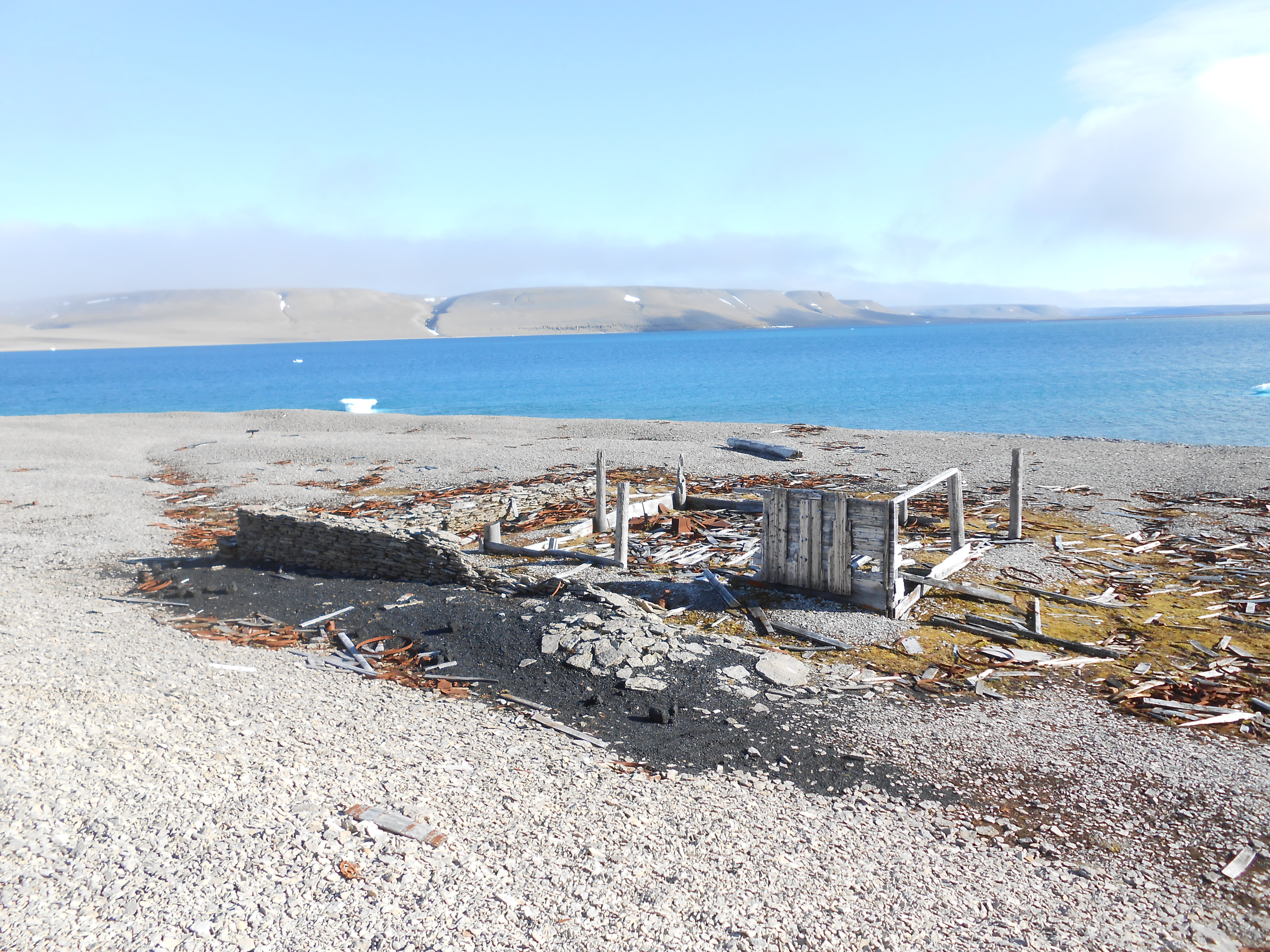
Remains of Northumberland House on the shore of Beechey Island, 2017

== In fiction ==
The explorers in Jules Verne's novel The Adventures of Captain Hatteras (French: Voyages et aventures du capitaine Hatteras) visit Beechey Island. In addition, Clive Cussler's novel, Arctic Drift (2008), featured characters who would visit this island in the quest for Franklin's ships. The island is also mentioned in Dan Simmons' novel, The Terror.
