= Owen Beattie =

Canadian professor of anthropology

- Born: 3 June 1949 (age 77); Victoria, British Columbia, Canada
- Known for: Exhumation of John Torrington, John Hartnell and William Braine in 1984 and 1986; Frozen in Time: The Fate of the Franklin Expedition

Owen Beattie (born 3 June 1949) is a Canadian professor of anthropology at the University of Alberta.

Beattie gained international attention in 1984 for his investigation into the lost expedition of Sir John Franklin, which had left England in 1845 searching for the Northwest Passage. His specialized knowledge of human skeletal biology and forensic anthropology has led Beattie to assist the RCMP and other agencies in criminal investigations and accidents, including the Hinton rail disaster in central Alberta. Through the exhumation in 1984 and 1986 of the frozen bodies of Petty Officer John Torrington, Able-bodied Seaman John Hartnell and Royal Marine William Braine, on Beechey Island, Beattie was able to trace the source of the lead to the expedition's tinned food supply.

Following the success of the Franklin research, Beattie turned his attention to the only other Northwest Passage exploration to have ended in mass disaster with no survivors, the 1719 expedition of Capt. James Knight. Beattie spent four Arctic field seasons investigating the Knight expedition mystery.

== Franklin's lost expedition ==
In June 1981, Beattie began the 1845–48 Franklin Expedition Forensic Anthropology Project (FEFAP) when he and his team of researchers and field assistants travelled from Edmonton to King William Island, traversing the island's western coast as Franklin's men did 132 years before. FEFAP hoped to find artifacts and skeletal remains in order to use modern forensics to establish identities and causes of death among the lost 129. In June 1982, a team made up of Beattie; Walt Kowall, a graduate student in anthropology at the University of Alberta; Arne Carlson, an archaeology and geography student from Simon Fraser University in British Columbia; and Arsien Tungilik, an Inuk student and field assistant, were flown to the west coast of King William Island, where they retraced some of the steps of Sir Francis McClintock in 1859 and Frederick Schwatka in 1878–79. Discoveries during this expedition included the remains of between six and fourteen men in the vicinity of McClintock's "boat place" and artifacts including a complete boot sole fitted with makeshift cleats for better traction. After returning to Edmonton in 1982 and learning of the lead-level findings from the 1981 expedition, Beattie struggled to find a cause. Possibilities included the lead solder used to seal the expedition's food tins, other food containers lined with lead foil, food colouring, tobacco products, pewter tableware, and lead-wicked candles. He came to suspect that the problems of lead poisoning compounded by the effects of scurvy could have been lethal for the Franklin crew. However, because skeletal lead might reflect lifetime exposure rather than exposure limited to the voyage, Beattie's theory could be tested only by forensic examination of preserved soft tissue as opposed to bone. Beattie decided to examine the graves of the buried crewmen on Beechey Island. Beattie collaborated with writer John G. Geiger on a book about the researches, Frozen In Time: The Fate of the Franklin Expedition, which became a best-seller in Canada, the United Kingdom and Germany, and has been published in many other countries. The Globe and Mail hailed the book as a "Canadian classic".

== Knight's lost expedition ==
In 1989, Owen Beattie turned his attention to another historical mystery, the disappearance of the 1719 expedition commanded by Capt. James Knight, which, like Franklin's, ended disastrously, with both ships lost and no survivors, on Marble Island, in the northwest part of Hudson Bay. Once again Beattie collaborated with Walk Kowal, and with John Geiger. The team conducted an archaeological survey of the area related to the Knight expedition, and the structure Knight had built on Quartzite Island. Enough information about the expedition was gathered to debunk historical accounts that Knight's men had died of starvation on the island. Once again, Beattie and Geiger co-authored a book, titled Dead Silence, which described the history and the search to understand Knight's fate.
