= John Torrington =

British explorer (1825–1846)

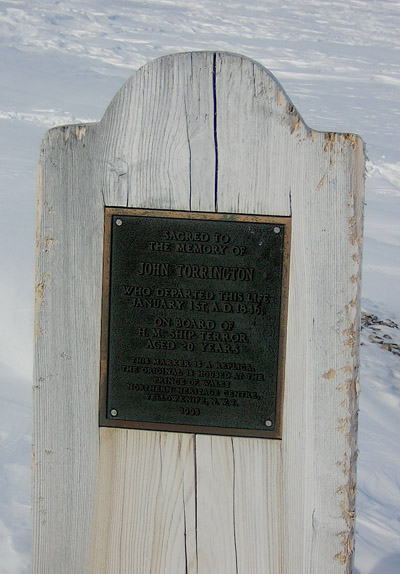
Grave of John Torrington

John Shaw Torrington (1825 – 1 January 1846) was a Royal Navy stoker. He was part of the 1845 Franklin Expedition to chart unexplored areas of what is now Nunavut, Canada, find the Northwest Passage, and make scientific observations. He was the first fatality of the expedition, of which all personnel ultimately died, mostly in and around King William Island. Torrington was buried on Beechey Island. His body was exhumed by forensic anthropologist Owen Beattie in 1984, to try to determine the cause of death. His remains are among the best preserved examples of a corpse since the ancient Tollund Man which was found in the 1950s. Photographs of his mummified remains were widely published and inspired music and literature.

== Early life ==
John Torrington was born in Manchester, England in 1825. In May 1845, at age 19, he joined the Franklin expedition and was assigned to HMS Terror as leading stoker.

== 1845 Franklin expedition ==
Torrington was a part of Sir John Franklin's final expedition to find the Northwest Passage, a sea route to Asia, via the northern edge of North America. They set off from Greenhithe, England in two ships, HMS Terror and HMS Erebus, on 19 May 1845. The trip was expected to last about three years, so the ships were packed with provisions which included more than 136,000 pounds of flour, 3,684 gallons of high-proof alcohol and 33,000 pounds of tinned meat, soup, and vegetables. However, after late July no Europeans heard from or saw the crew again. During the expedition, half of his monthly pay (2 pounds and 16 shillings) went to his stepmother Mary, who collected it from the Manchester Excise Office. She received this pay for years after he died, as the crew's fate went unknown.

== Search expeditions ==
Many search parties were sent to look for the missing crew, but nothing significant was discovered until 1850, when the ruins of a stone hut, some food cans, and three graves were found. The graves contained the remains of Torrington, William Braine and John Hartnell. Torrington had apparently died about seven months into the expedition, which led to further questions as to why crew members had died so early in the expedition. In 1976, the graves were rediscovered on Beechey Island, Nunavut, Canada and the headboards (presumed to be the originals) were transferred to the Prince of Wales Northern Heritage Centre in Yellowknife. In the 1980s, anthropologist Owen Beattie exhumed and autopsied the bodies to try to solve the mystery.

== Death and autopsy ==
Beattie and his team began their work on 17 August 1984. Torrington's coffin was 1.5 metres (4 ft 11 in) deep in the permafrost, which the team had to dig through. When the coffin was opened they saw how well preserved the outer parts of Torrington's body were, apparently not much different from the day he was buried. In order to thaw the body, the team poured water on the ice, to slowly melt it away and therefore not cause any damage to the body. Once thawed, they undressed the body to examine it. They found that Torrington had been very sick at the time of his death—he was so thin all his ribs were visible, and he only weighed about 38.5 kilograms (85 lb), at a height of 162.6 cm (5 ft 4 in). After conducting a thorough autopsy and taking some tissue samples, the team left to analyse what they had discovered.

Tissue samples revealed that Torrington's body had probably been stored on board ship while his grave was being dug; in almost all areas, significant cell autolysis had occurred, and cell definition was very poor. His brain was almost completely gone, leaving only a "yellow granular liquid". The lungs showed scarring from earlier bouts with tuberculosis as well as signs of more recent pneumonia. After toxicology analysis showed heightened levels of lead in Torrington's hair and fingernails, the team concluded Torrington had died from pneumonia, after suffering from various lung problems, which were aggravated by the lead poisoning. Beattie believed that the canned food was the most likely source of the lead and argued that 'lead played an important role in the declining health of the entire crews of the Erebus and Terror.' However, Franklin historian Russell Potter has pointed out that 'We know so little about the average exposure of a typical person in mid-nineteenth century Britain that we lack a reliable baseline to which to compare the Beechey island bodies....Further studies, looking both at the Beechey Island remains and at bones recovered from King William Island have shown a wide variety of levels of exposure, ranging from negligible to quite high....Torrington's levels were high (413-657 ppm) but Braine (145-280 ppm) and Hartnell (183-313) had much lower levels....Lead may well have been a factor for some, but the effect of this exposure on the expedition as a whole is unclear.'

=== Legacy ===
Photographs of Torrington, in a remarkable state of outward preservation, were published widely, including in People magazine which named him one of the world's most interesting personalities in 1984, and the widely reprinted photograph inspired James Taylor to write a song, "The Frozen Man", and Iron Maiden to write "Stranger in a Strange Land". British poet Sheenagh Pugh wrote an award-winning poem, "Envying Owen Beattie", about the Torrington exhumation. Authors Margaret Atwood and Mordecai Richler were also inspired by the photograph, and the account of the research provided by Beattie and John G. Geiger in their book Frozen In Time: The Fate of the Franklin Expedition. Atwood wrote a short story, "The Age of Lead", and Richler included references to the research and the Franklin expedition itself in his novel Solomon Gursky Was Here. In the 2018 television series The Terror, Torrington's sickness, death and burial are mentioned in the first episode.
