= Timothy McGee (USN) =

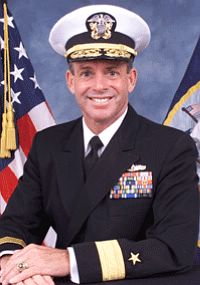
Rear Admiral Timothy McGee, Commander, Naval Meteorology and Oceanography Command.

Timothy James McGee (born 1955) is a retired officer of the United States Navy.

== Early life and education ==
McGee graduated from the United States Naval Academy in 1978. He later earned a master's degree in meteorology and oceanography from the Naval Postgraduate School in 1986.

== Career ==
McGee is notable for his former command of the Naval Meteorology and Oceanography Command. He retired from active duty in 2008. McGee has received the Distinguished Service Medal, the Legion of Merit, the Bronze Star Medal, the Defense Meritorious Service Medal and the Meritorious Service Medal.

== Arctic patrols ==
On July 10, 2007, the day following a policy announcement from Canadian Prime Minister Stephen Harper that Canada would be building a fleet of icebreakers to assert Canada's claims of Arctic sovereignty, McGee also announced that the United States Navy would be increasing its presence in the Arctic.

== Obama administration ==
President Barack Obama nominated McGee to be the Assistant Secretary of Commerce for Observation and Prediction in December 2009. After review by the Senate Committee on Environment and Public Works and the Senate Committee on Commerce, Science, and Transportation, the nomination was withdrawn in April 2010.

== Most recent appointment ==
Timothy McGee became President of the Sea Education Association in Woods Hole, MA on October 1, 2012.
