= Abacuk Pricket =

English explorer

Abacuk Pricket was the navigator of Discovery on the fourth voyage of captain Henry Hudson. He was one of the mutineers who set Hudson adrift along with his teenage son John, and seven crewmen in a small boat, and then returned to England, eventually being one of only eight sailors who made it back to England alive. He was tried in 1618, but the authorities did not want to execute those who had saved the expedition and did not prosecute them for mutiny, but for murder. The court found that it was not murder to turn experienced seamen adrift near a shore that was neither barren nor uninhabited, and acquitted Pricket.

Pricket is best known for writing a detailed account of Captain Hudson's journey to North America and the subsequent mutiny.

== Works ==
- A Journal of Mr. Hudson's last Voyage for the Discovery of a North-west Passage. Navigantium atque Itinerantium Bibliotheca. OCLC 17312467
- Excerpt from A Larger Discourse of the Same Voyage, by Abacuk Pricket,1625 archived at

== Notes and references ==
- "Henry Hudson: Daring Exploits". Pathfinders and Passageways: The Exploration of Canada: Expanding in All Directions. Library and Archives Canada. 19 July 2017. Archived from the original on 12 June 2019.
- Neatby, L.H. (1979) [1966]. "Hudson, Henry". In Brown, George Williams (ed.). Dictionary of Canadian Biography. Vol. I (1000–1700) (online ed.). University of Toronto Press.
- Janvier, Thomas A. (1909). Henry Hudson: A Brief Statement of His Aims And His Achievements at Project Gutenberg
