= John Hartnell =

British explorer

- Born: July 1820; Gillingham, Kent, UK
- Died: 4 January 1846 (aged 25); Beechey Island, North-Western Territory (now Nunavut, Canada)
- Military career
- Allegiance: United Kingdom
- Branch: Royal Navy
- Service years: 1841–1846
- Rank: Able seaman
- Served on: HMS Erebus
- Expeditions: Franklin expedition

John Hartnell (c. 1820 – 4 January 1846) was an English seaman who took part in Sir John Franklin's Northwest Passage expedition and was one of its first casualties, dying of suspected zinc deficiency and malnourishment during the expedition's first year.

He was buried on Beechey Island, next to John Torrington, who had become the expedition's first fatality on New Year's Day of 1846, and William Braine, who died three months later on 3 April.

The expedition had not yet run into trouble at this time and proper burials in the Arctic permafrost could be afforded. Because of the region's icy conditions, he was found in a remarkably well-preserved state when a scientific expedition exhumed his remains in 1986 to determine a cause of death.

== Biography ==
=== Early life ===
John Hartnell was born in Gillingham, Kent to a family of shipbuilders. His parents were Thomas and Sarah (maiden name: Friar, born 1796) Hartnell who were married at Frindsbury, in the Medway Towns area of Kent, on 9 October 1815, and with whom he was living in Gillingham at the time of the census of 1841. He was baptised at the Parish church of St. Mary Magdalene in Gillingham on 16 July 1820. He was raised in the trade of shoemaker.

=== Franklin expedition ===
Together with his brother Thomas he was assigned to HMS Erebus as an able seaman on the Franklin Northwest Passage expedition. They set off from Greenhithe on 19 May 1845 with two ships, the other being HMS Terror. The trip was expected to last about three years, so the ships were packed with provisions that included more than 136,000 pounds (62,000 kg) of flour, 3,684 imperial gallons (16,750 L) of high-proof alcohol, and 33,000 pounds (15,000 kg) of tinned meat, soup, and vegetables. However, the expedition was never heard from again by Europeans after July 1845.

=== Death and analysis ===
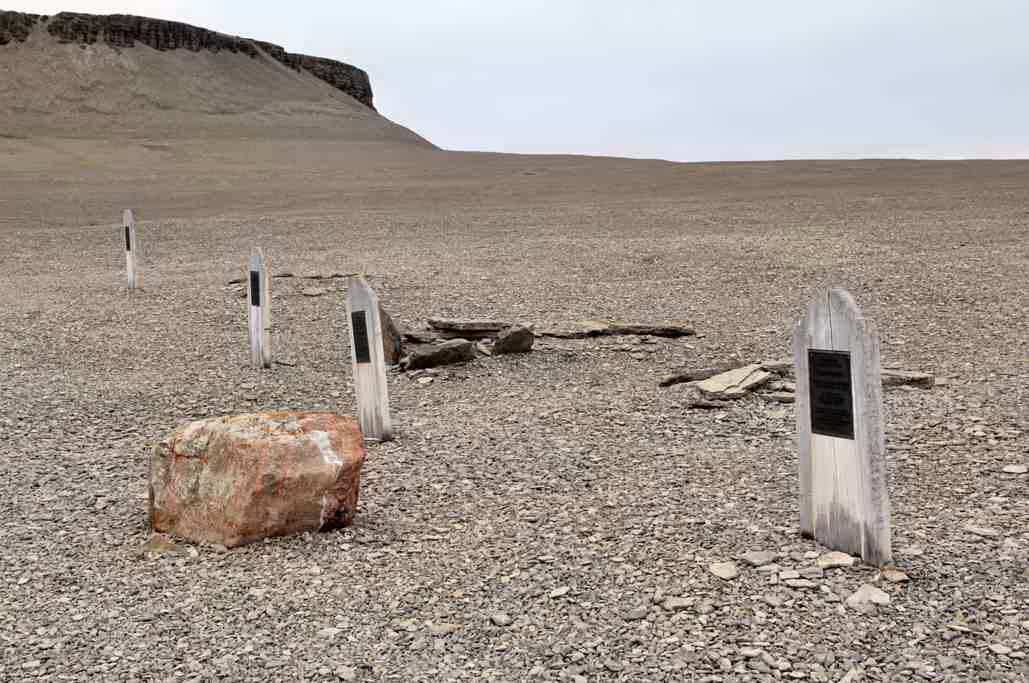
Graves of the expedition's first three fatal casualties. Hartnell's is the second from the right. The fourth grave is that of Thomas Morgan, a sailor who died in 1854 on one of the many subsequent fact-finding expeditions.

Pathology reports suggest that Hartnell had a damaged right eye, and it is unclear whether this happened before or after his death. According to his grave marker, Hartnell died on Beechey Island, on 4 January 1846, at the age of 25. He was buried in a shirt embroidered with the initials T.H. and the date 1844, likely having belonged to his brother Thomas. His tombstone was inscribed with a bible passage: ‘Thus saith the Lord of Hosts; Consider your ways’ (Haggai 1, 7).

In 1852, an expedition sent to find Franklin and his men arrived at Beechey Island. Commanded by Edward A. Inglefield, the crew of the Isabel included a physician, Peter Sutherland. Inglefield published a journal reporting their findings.

In 1984, professor of anthropology Owen Beattie from the University of Alberta and a group of scientists arrived at Beechey Island to examine the bodies and determine what may have happened to the three men whose lives ended on the tiny speck of land in the Canadian Arctic Archipelago. One of Hartnell's distant relatives, Hartnell's great-great-nephew, physics professor Brian Spenceley, was the expedition's photographer.

Beattie was surprised to see Hartnell's incredibly well-preserved, mummified remains through the melting ice, he was even more surprised to see that Hartnell's body had already been autopsied. Beattie and his team also noticed that Hartnell's right eye seemed damaged beyond the sinking-into-the-sockets effect that would have occurred from prior thawing. When Hartnell's cap was removed, they saw a great deal of hair – used to determine that his body contained large amounts of lead at the time of his death.

However, a 2016 analysis conducted on samples of Hartnell's removed fingernail and toenail found that malnourishment and zinc deficiency may have been his actual cause of death.

== In popular culture ==
Hartnell's brother, Tom, played by Jack Colgrave Hirst, is a supporting character in the television adaptation of the novel The Terror, and the burial of the three crewmen on Beechey Island is mentioned in the first episode.

== Bibliography ==
- Beattie, O.; Geiger, J. (2014). Frozen in Time: The Fate of the Franklin Expedition. Vancouver: Greystone Books. ISBN 9781771640800.
- Latta, J. B. (2001). The Franklin Conspiracy: An Astonishing Solution to the Lost Arctic Expedition. Toronto: Dundurn. ISBN 9781770700307.
