= William Braine =

British explorer

- Born: 1814; Oakhill, Somerset
- Died: 3 April 1846 (aged 32); Beechey Island, North-Western Territory (now Nunavut, Canada)
- Cause of death: Suspected Lead poisoning
- Resting place: Beechey Island; 74°43′N 091°51′W
- Occupation: Explorer

William Braine (1814 – 3 April 1846) was a British explorer. He served as a marine in the Royal Marines. From 1845 he was part of an expedition to find the Northwest Passage, but he died early in the trip and was buried on Beechey Island. His preserved body was exhumed in 1986, to try to determine the cause of death.

== Early life ==
William Braine was born in Oakhill, Somerset in 1814, and enlisted in the Royal Marines during the 1830s. He was assigned to HMS Erebus during Franklin's Lost Expedition.

== 1845 Franklin expedition ==
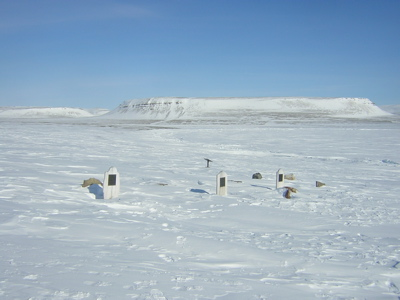
Graves of William Braine (left), John Torrington (right) and John Hartnell (center).

Braine was a part of Sir John Franklin's final expedition to find the Northwest Passage. The trip was expected to last about three years, so the ships were packed with provisions which included more than 136,000 pounds of flour, 3,684 gallons of high-proof alcohol and 33,000 pounds of tinned meat, soup and vegetables.

== Death ==
Braine died ten months into the expedition, and was buried on Beechey Island with John Torrington and John Hartnell. He died last, and his corpse was in the worst condition, having been gnawed by rats before burial. Modern postmortem examinations suggested symptoms of tuberculosis and lead poisoning. However, other studies suggest tuberculosis was unlikely to have contributed to his death.
