= Harry Peglar =

English Royal Navy seaman (1812 – c. 1849)

Henry Peter Peglar
- Born: 22 February 1812; Westminster, Middlesex, England
- Burial place: 25 April 1848 (aged 36); King William Island, North-Western Territory (now Nunavut, Canada)
- Military career
- Allegiance: United Kingdom
- Branch: Royal Navy
- Service years: 1825–1827; 1829; 1834–1848
- Ships: HMS Solebay; HMS Clio; HMS Magnificent; HMS Rattlesnake; HMS Serapis; HMS Perseus; HMS Prince Regent; HMS Talavera; HMS Gannet; HMS Temeraire; HMS Ocean; HMS Wanderer; HMS Terror
- Service: West Africa Squadron; First Opium War; Franklin expedition

Henry Peter Peglar (22 February 1812 – c. 1849) was an English seaman who served in the Royal Navy. He served as Captain of the Foretop, a Petty Officer rank, on HMS Terror during the 1845 Franklin Expedition, which sought to chart the Canadian Arctic, find the Northwest Passage, and make scientific observations. All expedition personnel died, including Peglar, mostly on and around King William Island. Several of his personal effects were found with a skeleton by Francis Leopold McClintock, which are among the only written materials known to belong to members of the expedition. In 2026, the skeleton was positively identified as belonging to Peglar. Earlier in his career, he engaged in anti-slavery operations in West Africa and served in the First Opium War.

== Biography ==
=== Early life and education ===
Harry Peglar was born to John and Sarah Peglar on 22 February 1812 and was baptized on 29 November 1813 alongside his sister Elizabeth, who had been born in 1810. His father was a gunsmith working at 12 Buckingham Row, Petty France, City of Westminster, England. John Peglar was a political radical who voted for Francis Burdett.

Harry Peglar was received by the Marine Society, a charitable organization for helping destitute boys and training seamen, on 4 August 1825. When admitted, he was already able to read and write, having possibly received an early education at the Blewcoat School, which was near his father's address.

=== Naval career ===
==== Training and preparations ====
In September 1825, one month after his admittance into the Marine Society, Peglar was sent to HMS Solebay, a shoreside training station where he was initiated into the navy, being trained in rowing, going aloft, managing sails, making knots and splices, using equipment such as the compass, and working guns and other arms, as well as in reading, writing, habituation to subordination and naval discipline, and religious instruction, going to Deptford Church on Sundays. As with the other seamen, he was provided with an abridged bible, a prayer book, and a full set of clothes and equipment (canvas bag, bonnet, jacket, trousers, shirts, canvas frock, hose, shoes, kerchief, woollen cap, comb, knife, needle, thread).

==== The Caribbean ====
Peglar was discharged "with a good character" from Solebay on 14 December 1825, and sent aboard the tender Star to join HMS Clio, stationed in the Chatham Dockyard. Aboard Clio, he served as a supernumerary for victuals as the ship travelled to Portsmouth. He was then transferred to HMS Magnificent, a hospital ship, where he was rated as Boy, supernumerary for wages and victuals, working in the sick quarters. He sailed to Plymouth and then on to Port Royal, Jamaica, where Magnificent became employed as a store ship under Lieutenant John Mundell.

The next Royal Navy ship on which Peglar definitively served was the 6th Rate 28-gun HMS Rattlesnake, which travelled throughout the Caribbean in 1826 and 1827. After leaving Magnificent, Peglar had written "tern over to H.M. Hulk Serreapis Commander Ellott [sic]," referring to HMS Serapis, stationed in Port Royal under command of John Elliot. Despite this, Peglar's name does not appear in Serapis's muster book. While aboard Rattlesnake, commanded by Captain John Leith, Peglar called upon most ports in the West Indies, including Inagua, Port-au-Prince, Havana, Montego, Santiago de Cuba, Chagres, as well as Bermuda and Halifax, before returning to England and paying off in September 1827 at the Woolwich Dockyard.

==== England 1827 ====
On 3 September 1827, only days after returning to England, Peglar joined the ship HMS Perseus, stationed at the Tower of London and commanded by Captain James Crouch. Perseus was a depot ship that served only to collect men to make up the complements of ships in commission. On 14 September, Peglar was sent to HMS Prince Regent, stationed in Chatham and commanded by George Poulett. Peglar was discharged from Prince Regent for an unknown reason, his record explained that he did something to an apprentice, but the details are no longer legible.

==== East India Company and Coast Blockade ====
After being discharged, Peglar entered the service the East India Company, and sailed under Thomas Larkins aboard the Marquis Camden, bound for St. Helena, as it was bringing Brigadier General Charles Dallas, who was appointed governor. Dallas, his wife, and three daughters landed on St. Helena on 29 April 1828 under a salute of thirteen guns which the crew of the ship manned. Marquis Camden then continued on its scheduled trip to Bombay (modern day Mumbai) and China. Shortly after leaving St. Helena, Peglar wrote that Marquis Camden was struck by lightning, which killed a sergeant and private. The ship then called upon the Paracels and Singapore, and visited Krakatoa before returning by St. Helena and returning to The Downs by the English Channel on 7 July 1829. All men were discharged two days later.

A Coast Blockade ship in The Downs called Ramillies was the next ship on which Peglar served. The duty of the ship was to investigate smuggling between England and France. Ramillies was known for having been a ship on which Hugh Pigot had previously served 1361 lashes to only 28 men in one morning, bringing the number to 2000 over the next few months. Peglar spent minimal time on Ramillies, and was moved to HMS Antelope, the ship's tender to Ramillies, engaged in the same work.

==== First return to the Royal Navy, second service with the East India Company ====
Peglar returned to the Royal Navy aboard HMS Talavera, a 3rd Rate, 74-gun ship that operated out of Sheerness. Hugh Pigot, who had commanded Ramillies had been put in charge of Talavera on 15 September 1829. Peglar wrote to be discharged from Talavera, and was successful in getting it.

Successfully out of the Royal Navy again, he rejoined Thomas Larkins aboard Marquis Camden which sailed for St Helena, Bombay, Penang, Singapore, and Macau. He served from 14 February 1832 until he was discharged 31 May 1833. He did not mention this service in his report due to it being unsatisfactory: he was disrated to ordinary seaman in January 1833, confined in irons, and punished with two dozen lashes for drunkenness and mutinous conduct. In his account he noted only one event, when the schooner Royal Tiger fired upon the poop deck of Marquis Camden, killing the Chief Mate John Fenn, who was buried the next day on shore.

==== Second return to the Royal Navy ====
Peglar joined, on 4 April 1834, the 18-gun brig-sloop HMS Gannet, which sailed first into the Mediterranean before crossing the Atlantic for four years’ service in North America and the West Indies. Peglar's service may again have been unsatisfactory, as he was rated initially as Captain of the Foretop, a senior petty officer, but served as lesser rates including gunner's crew and captain's coxswain, ending his service as an able seaman. Also aboard Gannet was Thomas Armitage, who would later serve alongside Peglar as gunroom steward aboard Terror, and who was believed to be the man whose skeleton was found with Peglar's items. Two other future Franklin expedition men, Charles Hamilton Osmer and James Walter Fairholme, served aboard Gannet at the same time as Peglar.

In February 1838, Peglar was discharged from Gannet, and joined HMS Temeraire at Sheerness as an able seaman. His service was unremarkable, and Sir John Hill (who was later in charge of the Deptford Victualling Yard when the Franklin Expedition was fitted out) recorded his conduct as "indifferent." Peglar then served briefly aboard HMS Ocean, where he entered as an able seaman and rated up to Captain of the Forecastle. He turned over to the sloop HMS Wanderer, keeping his position as Captain of the Forecastle.

==== HMS Wanderer ====
===== Anti-slavery operations =====
Peglar transferred to Wanderer on 3 December 1839, which sailed for the Caribbean in 1840. Thereafter, Wanderer was employed along the West Coast of Africa, where she fought against the slave trade. Britain had abolished the slave trade in 1807, and since 1808 had employed Royal Navy ships to engage in anti-slavery patrol. Between 1808 and 1860, the West Africa Squadron seized as many as 1600 ships involved in the slave trade and freed up to 150,000 Africans. The work was dangerous, as the ships were rarely made for coastal, river, and swamp operation, and disease and fever were common. The foundations of anti-slavery activity helped redefine the Navy's sense of purpose and frame British conceptions of the civilizing mission.

Since 17 November 1839, Wanderer was commanded by Joseph Denman, who managed the ship between Cape Verde and Cape Palmas, Liberia. Due to the activity there, Denman as captain of the Wanderer made treaties with local chiefs and expelled slave-traders before moving on to Sierra Leone where up to 200 slaves were emancipated. Most of the slave ships operating in the area of Sierra Leone and Liberia were registered under Spanish flags, but were owned and operated by American and British slave traders who were pushed to operate in Africa (and other locations including Cuba) because of domestic laws that banned the slave trade. In 1840, while Peglar was serving aboard, the crew of Wanderer destroyed the last two great slave-processing factories in Western Africa. In May 1840 Wanderer crew mounted a raid and destroyed eight slave depots, freeing 800 slaves bound for Cuba and captured fifteen slaving ships. These operations were the first time direct action was taken against slave camps on land, rather than intercepting ships as they left or entered harbours. The men of Wanderer had to wade through brackish and muddy water, sleep in bogs, and wear perpetually damp clothing, with malaria an ever-present threat that disabled sixteen of the men.

British MP Matthew Forster, who wanted to expand his Gambia-based merchant business, argued against Denman's testimony that Britain should not colonize the coast and declared the destruction of the factories illegal, which led to the slave traders suing Denman and British policy to cease being as aggressive in anti-slavery activity as Denman had wanted.

===== First Opium War =====
Wanderer sailed for India and then China, seeing action in the First Opium War near the end of the conflict. By August 1842, Wanderer was active in Chinese waters. During this voyage, the Wanderer men faced combat with Malay pirates. Among the men fighting the pirates was George Henry Hodgson, who would go on to serve as second lieutenant aboard Terror during the Franklin Expedition. Wanderer and the sloop HMS Harlequin engaged with men from Aceh, after they were accused of piracy against English merchant vessels, culminating in the burning of two local villages and several casualties from the two English ships; Harlequin's first lieutenant lost his left arm and nine further men were wounded to a degree they could no longer fight. Peglar earned the post of Captain of the Foretop aboard Wanderer and was rated "very good" by Denman when he was discharged on 27 June 1844.

=== Franklin Expedition ===
==== Preparations ====
Peglar spent several months ashore before signing on to Terror under Captain Francis Crozier, on 11 March 1845 in Chatham. During these months, according to the anonymous account of a crewmember of the Wanderer, he was the proprietor of a beer house in Westminster. Two other Wanderer men joined after him: George Henry Hodgson (on the recommendation of Erebus commander James Fitzjames) and William Gibson, who had served as an ordinary seaman in both West Africa and China. Maritime historian Glenn M. Stein has suggested that Hodgson and/or Peglar spoke up for Gibson's joining of the expedition; as an ordinary seaman Gibson would not have been allowed to join an arctic expedition, but an arrangement was made where he served a domestic position: subordinate officer's steward. Peglar left no allotment.

==== In the Canadian Arctic ====
The expedition overwintered on Beechey Island from 1845–1846, where three men died and were buried. In September 1846, after presumably sailing through Peel Sound and Franklin Strait, the ships became beset by ice in the northern Victoria Strait several kilometres north of King William Island. In April 1848, Erebus and Terror were still beset by ice, and twenty-one men including Commander of the Expedition John Franklin and Lieutenant Graham Gore had died. On 22 April 1848, Francis Crozier and one-hundred-four more surviving personnel deserted the ships, moved equipment including ship's boats across twenty-eight kilometres of sea ice and encamped on the northwest corner of King William Island. On 26 April, the group set off to find the Back River and help from a Hudson Bay Company post on the Canadian mainland. All of the men died after the desertion of the ships, mostly between 1848 and 1851, though the ships were likely remanned and exact timelines are speculative.

Peglar, alongside the rest of the expedition personnel, was declared dead on 3 March 1854. His arrears of pay were given to a married sister who was his next of kin.

== Gladman Point skeleton ==
Shortly after midnight on 25 May 1859, Francis Leopold McClintock, while investigating the Franklin Expedition on King William Island, came across a partly-exposed bleached human skeleton, face-down along a gravel ridge. McClintock identified the location as nine miles east of Cape Herschel, placing it at Gladman Point. It is the only human remains found within the 30 mile stretch between Washington Bay and Tulloch Point, and was never buried, indicating they may have been a solitary straggler who was separated from the main party, possibly by a sudden blizzard, a weather event known to occur on King William Island.

The skeleton had with it fragments of clothing, and a wallet with a pocket book and various papers. McClintock believed the words of the book were written in German, but they were English written backwards, resulting in words like "eht" for "the" and "meht" for "them." Among the papers was Peglar's seaman's certificate, leading to the papers being called the "Peglar Papers." Two different sets of handwriting, one Peglar's and one unidentified, who addresses Peglar by name, make up the documents. Other items with the skeleton were a half sovereign from 1844, a sixpence from 1831, a horn pocket comb with light brown hairs, and a small clothes brush. The remains were not collected by McClintock, and he provided no report of their treatment after discovery.

The skeleton was believed to not have been refound until 2022, when Douglas Stenton identified that accounts and maps had geographic errors, and that the site had been found and excavated in 1973 by members of the 1st Battalion, Royal Canadian Regiment, CFB London, and the Defence and Civil Institute of Environmental Medicine. One photograph was taken in-situ and another post-excavation, having been reassembled on a sheet of plywood. The finders estimated the skeleton belonged to a person about six feet tall in life, but the methods they used to determine this are unknown. The bones and some artefacts, consisting of three cloth-covered metal buttons, one pearl button, and several pieces of cloth, were gathered up and brought to the National Museum of Man in Ottawa (now the Canadian Museum of History). Analyses were performed on the remains in the museum, but the accounts were not published. The location of the remains and artefacts is unknown as of August 2022, and the museum officially lists their whereabouts as "unknown."

The 1973 site was re-examined in 2019, and a left first metatarsal as well as buttons were found. The metatarsal is regarded as being from the remains exhumed in 1973 and DNA analyses provided mitochondrial and Y-chromosome haplogroups indicating a male of European ancestry, and the buttons are consistent with those found by earlier searchers.

Several potential identities were put forward for the skeleton, which was identified as Peglar's on May 6, 2026, with the use of DNA testing by Douglas Stenton at the University of Waterloo.

=== Harry Peglar ===
Due to the fact that Peglar's personal documents were found with the body, it was initially identified as his. Those who rejected the theory pointed to the fact that the skeleton was dressed in a steward's uniform, something a senior petty officer like Peglar would never have done. As the person was carrying Peglar's important documents at their death, Russell Potter suggested it was probable the person was a friend of Peglar who was carrying his letters after Peglar had died. While it is possible Peglar was wearing whatever clothes were on hand, among the effects was a small clothes brush, a piece of equipment an actual steward or officer's servant would be carrying around, further evidencing that the skeleton was not Peglar. Franklin Expedition scholars including David C. Woodman rejected the idea that it was Peglar's body. The body was positively identified as Peglar's in 2026.

=== Thomas Armitage ===
Thomas Armitage was gunroom steward aboard HMS Terror and aged about 40 in 1845. He and Peglar had previously met while serving together from 1834 to 1838 aboard HMS Gannet, and as a steward he matched the clothing and items found on the skeleton. The writings with the skeleton included a mention of "Cumanar," referring to Cumaná, Venezuela, a city that Peglar and Armitage both visited from late 1834 through January 1835 while aboard Gannet. Armitage's hair colour (brown) and height (5' 9") are both consistent with the skeleton. The Royal Museums Greenwich considers Armitage the identity of the skeleton. One of the lines within the narrative journal says "all my art Tom," which Russell Potter notes may represent an English dialect where the initial letter 'h' is silent, thus spelling "all my heart, Tom." Elsewhere, the writer spells "open" as "Hopen" indicating unfamiliarity of spelling words with silent h's at the beginning. Evidence suggests that Armitage was illiterate in 1826, as he signed his marriage certificate with an X rather than his name, subsequently making it less likely he was the second writer in the Peglar papers. In 1845, when he made an allotment, he still signed his name with an X, indicating he had not learned how to write in the intervening years.

=== William Gibson ===
Subordinate officer's steward William Gibson had a longer and more recent connection to Peglar, as they served together between January 1840 and June 1844 aboard Wanderer, working together in operations against pirates and slavers. The writings include a reference to "Comfort Cove," a location on Ascencion Island that Peglar and Gibson visited together but that Armitage has no record of visiting. Gibson also had brown hair, as did Peglar and Armitage. Gibson was literate when he joined Terror in 1845.

== The Peglar papers ==
In addition to Peglar's seaman's certificate, the wallet found with the skeleton contained several paper documents: various scraps of newspaper, a hand-written narrative of Peglar's service going around the sides of a piece of paper in a square, a parody of the poem "The Sea" by Bryan Waller Procter in Peglar's handwriting dated 21 April 1847, various narrative journal entries including a capture of a turtle, and various pieces of paper with addresses formatted like letters. The parody of The Sea, beginning "The C the C the open C it grew so fresh the Ever free," is a play on Procter's poem where the "C" is a ribald double-entendre for the female genitalia, representing the desire for both the freedom of the open water and unrestricted sexuality which was impossible to hold in the restrictive and dangerous context of a seagoing naval vessel.

One of the most significant lines is a couplet beginning with "O Death whare is thy Sting / the Grave at Comfort Cove." These represent a eulogy, as the opening line is from the Service for the Burial of the Dead in the Book of Common Prayer, a text with which all Royal Navy seamen would have been expected to be familiar with. Other lines including "The Dyer was and whare Traffalegar [sic]" circumstantially suggest that the burial service being transcribed was Franklin's, as he was the only expedition member who was also a veteran of the Battle of Trafalgar. Other references to events occurring during the expedition are also within the text: a drawing of "Lid Bay," a place encountered by the expedition and named on account of its eye-like shape, references to "new boots," "hard ground to heave" (either grave-digging or sledge-hauling) and the phrase "Terror Camp is clear," but due to the poor legibility of the documents the full context is missing, and most of the sentences remain unreadable without advanced forensic techniques. One legible portion reads "the 21st night a gread [sic]" which Russell Potter suggests may refer to 21 April 1848, the day before 105 survivors deserted the ships and four days before the last official communication, an addendum to the Victory Point Note, was written.

Of the various addresses given on letters, only one has been identified as a legitimate address with a known occupant: one William Eames Heathfield, a chemist with a shop at 10 Pall Mall in London. Heathfield became a member of the Royal Geographical Society in 1863, and was acquainted with Roderick Murchison, indicating some connection to Arctic exploration, but there are no known ties between him and Peglar or Armitage. As the letter says "in care of," it is possible the writer wished to reach another person through Heathfield rather than correspond with Heathfield himself. Other letters are fanciful, including one address to "Miss down fall" on the fictional "Old Free Street."

== See also ==
- John Gregory, engineer of Erebus whose skeletal remains were identified by DNA in 2021.
- List of people who disappeared mysteriously at sea
- Personnel of Franklin's lost expedition, for Peglar's shipmates
