= John Gregory (engineer) =

English engineer

- Born: September 6, 1806; Salford, Lancashire, England
- Died: May 1848 (aged 41); King William Island, Canada
- Occupation(s): Railway and naval engineer
- Known for: Member of Franklin's lost expedition; identification of remains via DNA analysis in 2021

John Gregory (6 September 1806—c. May 1848) was an English railway and naval engineer. He served as engineer aboard HMS Erebus during the 1845 Franklin Expedition, which sought to explore uncharted parts of what is now Nunavut, including the Northwest Passage, and make scientific observations. The ships were outfitted with former railway locomotive engines which served as auxiliary power units, which is why Gregory, who had never been to sea, served on the expedition. All expedition personnel perished in uncertain conditions, mostly on and around King William Island. In 2021, Gregory's remains became the first of the 129-man expedition to be positively identified using DNA analysis.

== Biography ==
=== Early life ===
John Gregory was born 6 September 1806 in Salford, Lancashire (now part of Greater Manchester), the eldest child of William Gregory, a grocer, and his wife Frances. He was baptized in the Church of St. Michaels, Angel Meadow, a chapel of ease in the most notorious slum of the city during the nineteenth century. His father William was literate, and John likely learned to read and write from a young age. Historian Ralph Lloyd-Jones had in 2018 supposed a 1790 birth date for John Gregory based on genealogical research. In 2021, a team led by Douglas R. Stenton verified that this was an error, as the 1790 John Gregory, a son of John and Mary Gregory, died in infancy and was buried on 1 April 1791.

=== Life and career ===
John Gregory married Hannah Wilson at St. Michael's Church in Ashton-under-Lyne (Hannah's birthplace) on 14 April 1823. Their first child, Edward John Gregory, was baptized on 15 June 1823, only two months after the wedding. The allotment books of Erebus mistakenly referred to their marriage date as 1822.

Gregory was employed by Lambeth-based engineering company Maudslay, Sons & Field, a prominent manufacturer of boilers and steam engines. He and his family lived at 7 Ely Place, London in 1845.

== Franklin expedition ==
=== Preparations ===
HMS Erebus and HMS Terror were the first wooden warships of the Royal Navy to be converted into steam driven screw ships, modifications made for the attempt at the Northwest Passage at the suggestion of former Arctic explorer and Comptroller of Steam Machinery Sir William Edward Parry. Henry Maudslay of Maudslay, Sons & Field was contracted to supply the propulsion systems, and being unable to procure new engines, used preexisting ones taken from the railway: "Croydon" and "Archimedes," two six-wheel steam locomotives built in 1838—1839 by engineering company G & J Rennie for the London and Croydon Railway.

In addition to the engines, Maudslay, Sons & Field provided two men to maintain them: James Thompson on Terror and John Gregory on Erebus. On Gregory's naval book it was written: "This Engineer was recommended by Messrs Maudslay to serve in one of the Vessels employed in the Arctic Expedition having been accustomed to locomotive Engines. His pay to be double that allowed to 1st Class Engineers (Woolwich 6th May 1845) Admiralty 13 May/45." Both Thompson and Gregory were hired on only one week's notice, after substandard performance tests conducted in the weeks leading up to the ships' departure in May 1845. Gregory allotted £13 of his wages per month to his wife Hannah.

As Engineer, Gregory was a warrant officer alongside Boatswain Thomas Terry and Carpenter John Weekes on Erebus, with their Terror counterparts being Engineer James Thompson, Boatswain John Lane, and Carpenter Thomas Honey. Warrant officers served as heads of specialist technical branches aboard ship and reported directly to the captain.

=== Leaving England ===
The expedition was Gregory's first time at sea. On 9 July 1845, two weeks after Erebus and Terror departed Greenhithe, Kent, he wrote a letter to his wife in which he described his first time seeing whales and icebergs. The letter was sent from Greenland before the expedition sailed into the Canadian Arctic, and was the last contact Gregory had with his family. The letter concluded with the line “Give my kind Love to Edward, Fanny, James, William, and kiss baby for me – and accept the same yourself." The letter is held in the Scott Polar Research Institute Archives at the University of Cambridge.

=== In the Canadian Arctic ===
The ships spent the first winter at Beechey Island, where three men (John Torrington, John Hartnell, and William Braine) died and were buried. The ships were trapped in ice northwest of King William Island in 1846. In April 1848, the ships were still beset by the ice, in the northern Victoria Strait and twenty-one men including John Franklin had died. On 22 April 1848, Francis Crozier and one-hundred-four more surviving officers and men deserted the ships, moved equipment including small boats across twenty-eight kilometres of sea ice and encamped on the northwest corner of King William Island, only a few kilometres south of Victory Point. Four days later, they set off to find the Back River and help from a Hudson Bay Company post on the Canadian mainland.

John Gregory survived three years trapped aboard Erebus and was one of the survivors led by Crozier south along King William Island. He was among at least twenty-three sailors who were left with two ship's boats in Erebus Bay. He died seventy-five kilometres south of the landing site, on the shore of Erebus Bay. Douglas Stenton estimated he died in May 1848. Two other men had died with him.

== Remains and identification ==
=== History of the remains ===
The first person to search the area where Gregory's body lay was W. R. Hobson of Francis Leopold McClintock's expedition in 1859. He found in Erebus Bay a ship's boat resting on its sledges, large quantities of supplies and personal effects, and the partial remains of two skeletons. In 1861, Netsilik Inuit travelled there to find useful artefacts, finding two boats and large quantities of skeletal remains. Neither McClintock's party nor the Inuit buried any of the remains. An expedition consisting of Frederick Schwatka, William Henry Gilder, Heinrich Klutschak, Frank E. Melms, and Ipirvik ("Joe Ebierbing") explored the same area in 1879. Schwatka buried the human remains he found, including those that would later be identified as belonging to John Gregory.

Modern archaeological expeditions in Erebus Bay started in 1982 and identified five major sites (NhLi-1, NgLj-1, NgLj-2, NgLj-3, and NgLj-39) consisting of over five hundred bones representing at least twenty-one Franklin expedition men. Gregory's skull was rediscovered by amateur historian Barry Ranford in 1993, who had initially believed it to be a bleached plastic bottle while sledging along King William Island. The skull was photographed by Andrew Gregg and appeared in a 1995 CBC Television special hosted by Carol Off. By 1997, enough of the bones were visible from the surface due to disturbance that they were interred in a cairn with a commemorative plaque. The remains were excavated in 2013 in order to extract DNA. Using the skull as a base, a facial reconstruction of John Gregory was made by Diana Tretkov prior to the identification of the remains. The remains were reburied on-site in 2014.

=== Identification ===
The skull belonging to Gregory was found at NgLj-3 with one of his molars being given the designation NgLj-3:34 and subjected to genetic and isotopic analysis. The archaeological DNA of twenty-nine expedition personnel has been analyzed as of 2021, with twenty-three coming from sites in Erebus Bay. Seventeen self-identified descendants of expedition personnel have submitted DNA samples for comparison. The first sixteen found no matches, but the seventeenth matched with John Gregory. Jonathan Gregory (b. 1982) from Port Elizabeth, South Africa, John Gregory's great-great-great-grandson was confirmed a DNA match to NgLj-3:34 in 2021 by a team of researchers from University of Waterloo, Lakehead University, and Trent University. Gregory was the first expedition member to be identified using DNA analysis. Gregory is the sixth expedition member to have his remains identified by any means, after John Torrington, John Hartnell, William Braine, John Irving, and Harry Goodsir. In 2024, the remains of James Fitzjames were also identified through DNA. The identification of Gregory has been described as one of the most important developments in Franklin expedition research in 2021.

== See also ==
- Body identification
- List of people who disappeared mysteriously at sea
- List of unsolved deaths
- Personnel of Franklin's Lost Expedition, for Gregory's shipmates
- Harry Goodsir, a Franklin Expedition officer also identified with modern forensic techniques
- Harry Peglar, a Franklin Expedition member whose personal effects are among its only written materials
- Bioarchaeology, the study of human bones from archaeological sites
