= Kane's Hedge =

Hedgerow in Banbridge, Northern Ireland

Kane's Hedge is a forty-eight metres long and 14 metre high hedgerow in the town of Banbridge, in Northern Ireland. It circles the housing estate of 'Windy Ridge,' and has been described as a 'Natural Phenomenon.' It was planted around 1898, after the first bridge was constructed over the Upper Bann, surrounding Avonmore House, the birthplace of Francis Crozier, a local hero. It is said to have been planted on the orders of his father, George Crozier, Esq. whose mighty sister (and gardener), Jane Hughes laid down the seeds, before following in her Father's footsteps to the North Pole nearly half a decade after he did not return.
