= James Fitzjames =

British naval officer and polar explorer (1813–1848?)

Captain James Fitzjames
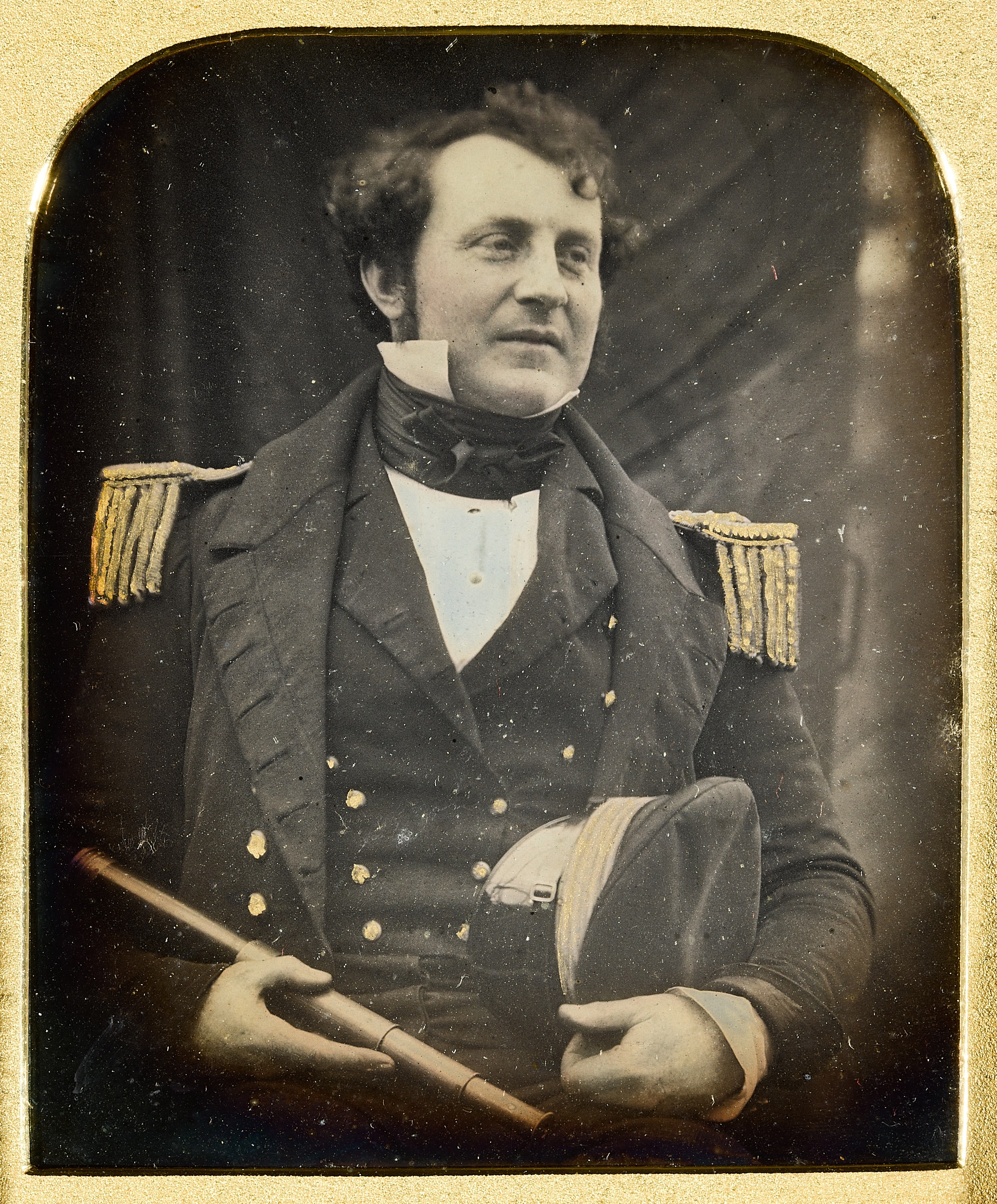
- Fitzjames in 1845
- Born: 27 July 1813; London, England
- Died: c. May 1848 (aged 34); King William Island, North-Western Territory
- Military career
- Allegiance: United Kingdom
- Branch: Royal Navy
- Service years: 1825–1848
- Rank: Captain
- Wars; Expeditions: Egyptian–Ottoman War; First Opium War; Euphrates expedition; Franklin expedition

James Fitzjames (27 July 1813 – c. May 1848) was a British Royal Navy officer and explorer.

The illegitimate son of a man with ties to the Navy, Fitzjames distinguished himself in an ill-conceived expedition to establish a steamship line in Mesopotamia in the 1830s, and in combat during the Egyptian–Ottoman War and the First Opium War. In 1845, Fitzjames was tapped by Sir John Barrow as a potential leader of an expedition to the Northwest Passage, but was instead named as captain of HMS Erebus under Sir John Franklin.

Known as Franklin's lost expedition, both ships that had embarked on that voyage became trapped in the Arctic ice off King William Island in 1846. Following Franklin's death the next year, Fitzjames became second-in-command to Captain Francis Crozier of HMS Terror. The ships were abandoned in April 1848 and the survivors set out for the Canadian mainland. Fitzjames and twelve others died in the vicinity of Erebus Bay, 80 kilometres (50 mi) from where they had abandoned the ships. His remains were rediscovered in 1993 and forensically identified in September 2024.

== Early life ==
=== Family and birth ===
James Fitzjames was born the illegitimate son of Sir James Gambier on 27 July 1813. He was baptised on 24 February 1815 at St Marylebone Parish Church in London, but his parents were listed as "James Fitzjames" and "Ann Fitzjames." As of 2024, his mother's identity remains unknown.

As an illegitimate child, his friends and relatives took great pains to conceal his origins, both during his life and after. Though biographer William Battersby initially believed Fitzjames was born in Rio de Janeiro in what was then Colonial Brazil, he later issued a correction stating Fitzjames was more likely born in London as stated on his naval entry papers.

The identification of his true family had been unknown until Battersby's publication in 2010. In different sources it had been suggested that he was a foundling; that he was of Irish extraction, an illegitimate son of Sir James Stephen, or a relative of the Coninghams.

Although not always successful, the Gambier family were prominent in the Royal Naval service. Sir James' cousin was Admiral of the Fleet Lord Gambier. His father, and James Fitzjames' grandfather, was Vice Admiral James Gambier.

Sir James Gambier had married Jemima Snell in 1797 and the couple had 12 children altogether. At the time of Fitzjames' birth, Sir James was in grave financial difficulties. He had been appointed British Consul-General in Rio de Janeiro in 1809 and held this office until 1814. However the Gambiers returned to England in 1811 on account of Lady Gambier's health, never to return to Brazil. Cut off from the revenues he expected to receive in Rio, Sir James ran up enormous debts, only saved from bankruptcy when a syndicate of his relatives and creditors, led by Admiral Lord Gambier himself, William Morton Pitt and Samuel Gambier, took over his financial affairs and placed them in trust. In 1815, with his financial affairs in the hands of trustees, Sir James resumed a diplomatic career by being appointed Consul-General to the Netherlands at The Hague, a position he held until 1825.

=== Adoptive family ===
Presumably shortly after his birth, Fitzjames was given into the care of the Reverend Robert Coningham and his wife Louisa Capper, who wrote philosophical and poetical works. The Coninghams were well-off members of an extended family of Scots/Irish ancestry.

The Coningham family lived at Watford and Abbots Langley in Hertfordshire, and also at Blackheath. In 1832 they acquired a substantial 30 acre country estate called Rose Hill in Abbots Langley. Robert and Louisa had one son, William Coningham, who was James Fitzjames' closest friend; the two boys were brought up together as brothers. The Coninghams were a well-educated couple who had extensive connections in British intellectual circles of the time. Robert Coningham was a Cambridge-educated clergyman although he never took a living. His nephew was the author John Sterling, a friend of such intellectuals as Julius Hare and Thomas Carlyle. Before she married, Louisa Coningham had taught at the Rothsay House girls' school in Kennington and was the author of two books.

This intellectual background enabled them to provide Fitzjames and William Coningham with an exceptionally high level of education. William Coningham was briefly sent to Eton College while Fitzjames was away at sea serving on HMS Pyramus. On Fitzjames' return to the Coningham household, William Coningham was withdrawn from Eton and the boys' education was provided at home by private tutors, including a son of Robert Towerson Cory, who later tutored the Prince of Wales for Queen Victoria and Prince Albert. Fitzjames was brought up by the Coningham family as a son, and he always referred to them as 'uncle' and 'aunt'.

== Naval career ==
=== Under captains Gambier and Sartorius ===
Fitzjames entered the Royal Navy at the age of 12 in July 1825 as a volunteer of the second class on HMS Pyramus, a frigate under the command of captain Robert Gambier. He served on Pyramus until 15 September 1828, being promoted to volunteer of the first class on 1 July 1828. Captain Robert Gambier was James Fitzjames' second cousin, and it was through this covert family connection that he obtained this position. This captain resigned his position a year later due to the unexpected death of his wife, leaving Fitzjames vulnerable as he had no connection with the new captain, George Sartorius.

Fitzjames won the confidence of Captain Sartorius, who promoted him to Volunteer of the First Class in 1828. During this commission Pyramus first sailed to Central America and the United States on diplomatic missions and was then involved in scientific research as part of the Experimental Squadron under Admiral Sir Thomas Hardy. Later, the Pyramus served as British guardship at Lisbon.

After this Fitzjames was determined to resume his Royal Naval career and eventually took the position of Midshipman on HMS St Vincent from 1830 to 1833. St Vincent was the flagship of the Royal Navy's Mediterranean Fleet but spent much time in port at Malta.

Fitzjames served detached duty on a cutter, HMS Hind, sailing twice to Constantinople, and on HMS Madagascar, during which time Madagascar conveyed Otto of Greece from Trieste to Nauplia, where Otto was crowned King of Greece. During this time Fitzjames passed his exams for promotion to lieutenant. Returning to Britain on St Vincent in 1833, he almost immediately obtained a position on HMS Winchester, Vice Admiral Hyde Parker's flagship.

=== Euphrates Expedition ===
Robert Coningham was very close to a relative of his, Major Colin Campbell, who after Fitzjames' death became famous as Field Marshal Lord Clyde. Campbell introduced Fitzjames to Francis Rawdon Chesney, then a captain of the engineers, who was putting together an expedition to establish a steamship line in Mesopotamia.

The venture became known as the Euphrates Expedition, and served as a precursor to the creation of the Suez Canal as it linked the Near East across Mesopotamia to the river systems that flowed into the Persian Gulf. Rather impulsively, Fitzjames immediately resigned his position on HMS Winchester to join Chesney's expedition.

Fitzjames served on the Euphrates Expedition from 1834 to 1837. Before the expedition had even sailed, he distinguished himself by diving into the River Mersey fully clothed to rescue a drowning man. He was awarded a silver cup and the Freedom of the City of Liverpool for this feat of bravery.

Although the expedition was promoted with great energy, it was not a success. The two steamers, Tigris and Euphrates, had to be transported in pieces 130 miles (210 km) across the mountains and desert terrain of northern Syria from the Mediterranean coast to the river Euphrates, a tremendous effort which took over a year to complete. The smaller steamer, Tigris, sank with heavy loss of life in a sudden storm, and the draught of Euphrates, the surviving vessel, was too deep to sail on the river for much of the year. In addition there were tremendous difficulties caused both by political complications and the outbreak of disease.

Chesney was determined to continue, and would not release officers, including Fitzjames; the expedition, however, was eventually halted by the British government and East India Company, its two major sponsors. In 1836, with the steamer Euphrates unable to sail up the shallows of the river, having broken its engine, Fitzjames volunteered to take the India Office mails she was carrying 1,200 miles (1,900 km) across what is now Iraq and Syria to the Mediterranean coast and from there convey them to London.

=== Resumption of naval career ===
After many extremely dangerous adventures (he was nearly kidnapped and trapped in a besieged town) Fitzjames succeeded in returning to London. Here he was reunited with the surviving members of the expedition as they straggled back home. While he was away, Robert Coningham died suddenly, on 21 May 1836.

On the expedition, Fitzjames formed a close friendship with one of the other Royal Navy officers participating, Edward Charlewood. Charlewood and Fitzjames found that contrary to the understanding of Colonel Chesney, the Admiralty refused to credit their service on the Euphrates Expedition as 'sea-time', and it therefore would not count toward their promotion. Chesney did everything in his power to support his subordinates, and after nearly a year the Admiralty relented and granted the officers their promotions.

Fitzjames resumed Royal Naval service and followed a much more conventional career path. Together with Charlewood, he next served on HMS Excellent, the recently established gunnery school, where he passed out with very high marks. At this time he also formed a close, albeit also professionally extremely useful, friendship with John Barrow, the son of Sir John Barrow, a highly influential Second Secretary to the Admiralty. From this point on the two men corresponded regularly.

=== Egyptian–Ottoman War ===
A highly qualified gunnery lieutenant, James Fitzjames was in demand: together with his experience of the Middle East, this won him the position of gunnery lieutenant on HMS Ganges in the Egyptian–Ottoman War of 1839 to 1840. He was regarded as an effective officer and was especially commended by Admiral Sir Charles Napier for landing at night to distribute a proclamation to Egyptian soldiers at their camp. It was a risky enterprise, but he escaped back to Ganges.

When informed of this daring exploit Ibrahim Pasha, the Egyptian general, put a price on Fitzjames' head. Before service was completed, James Fitzjames was selected by Admiral Sir William Parker as gunnery lieutenant on HMS Cornwallis, his flagship for the force being assembled in Britain to fight the First Opium War.

=== First Opium War ===
His service in this war was again marked by notably reckless bravery, he was almost killed during the capture of Zhenjiang; he was evacuated to Cornwallis when a musket ball passed through his arm into his back, lodging against his spine. Senior officers took further notice of an extrovert; Fitzjames wrote and published a 10,000-word humorous poem, The Cruise of HMS Cornwallis, describing the First Opium War and his part in that particular uprising, which was published in The Nautical Magazine. Ostensibly anonymous, he referred to himself under the byline "Tom Bowline".

En route to war, HMS Cornwallis spent five days at Singapore. While there on shore leave, Fitzjames had some sort of encounter with Sir George Barrow, the eldest surviving son of Sir John Barrow. It was William Battersby's theory that Barrow was in a highly compromised situation, and Fitzjames appeared to have paid someone off and thereby covered up whatever scandal would otherwise have broken over the Barrow family. Battersby believed that thenceforward Sir John Barrow blatantly favoured Fitzjames, promoting his candidacy at any available opportunity; the first fruits were accelerated promotion to commander and appointment to command HMS Clio. Joining the Clio in Bombay, the new captain cruised the Persian Gulf and carried out various diplomatic duties before returning to Portsmouth in October 1844.

=== Franklin's lost expedition ===
Returning to England, Fitzjames lived with William Coningham, his wife Elizabeth (née Meyrick) and their two young children at their home in Brighton. He was on half-pay, meaning he was available for naval service but not presently working on a ship.

Sir John Barrow, a prime mover of what became the Franklin expedition, campaigned to have Fitzjames appointed to lead it. He asked for his friend Edward Charlewood to be appointed as second in command. Barrow was unable to provide the Board of Admiralty with a persuasive argument to support these appointments, and Fitzjames was discounted due to his relatively young age, so after some prevarication Sir John Franklin and Francis Crozier were appointed instead.

Fitzjames was appointed to serve under Franklin as the Captain of HMS Erebus. Once appointed to the Franklin Expedition, Fitzjames was given the responsibility of recruitment of expedition personnel. He selected many persons he was familiar with, including George Henry Hodgson.

The ships sailed from Greenhithe on 19 May 1845. One of the ports they stopped at on the way north was Stromness, Orkney. Fitzjames gave permission to two Orcadian sailors — Captain of the Foretop Robert Sinclair and Able Seaman Thomas Work — to row ashore and visit their families in Kirkwall. Fitzjames wrote daily letters, which he had sent home when the ships came into port in Disko Bay, Greenland.

The ships were last seen by Europeans at the end of July 1845, when two whalers sighted them in northern Baffin Bay. The Admiralty promoted Fitzjames to the rank of Captain on 31 December 1845, but he was in the Arctic at the time and never learned of it.

=== Captaincy and death ===
After the death of Sir John Franklin on 11 June 1847, Captain Francis Crozier of HMS Terror became the expedition leader. Fitzjames became second in command of the expedition, as well as commander of Erebus. Fitzjames wrote an addendum to the 'Victory Point note' explaining their circumstances. Crozier indicated after Fitzjames that they were headed for Back's Fish River.

Fitzjames died on King William Island, in the vicinity of Erebus Bay, likely in May or June 1848, alongside Erebus engineer John Gregory and at least eleven other sailors from the expedition, only eighty kilometres south of Victory Point. Fitzjames's remains were subjected to cannibalism by survivors. Because John Franklin and Lieutenant Graham Gore had already died, upon Fitzjames's death, command of the Erebus would have passed to H. T. D. Le Vesconte, assuming he was still alive.

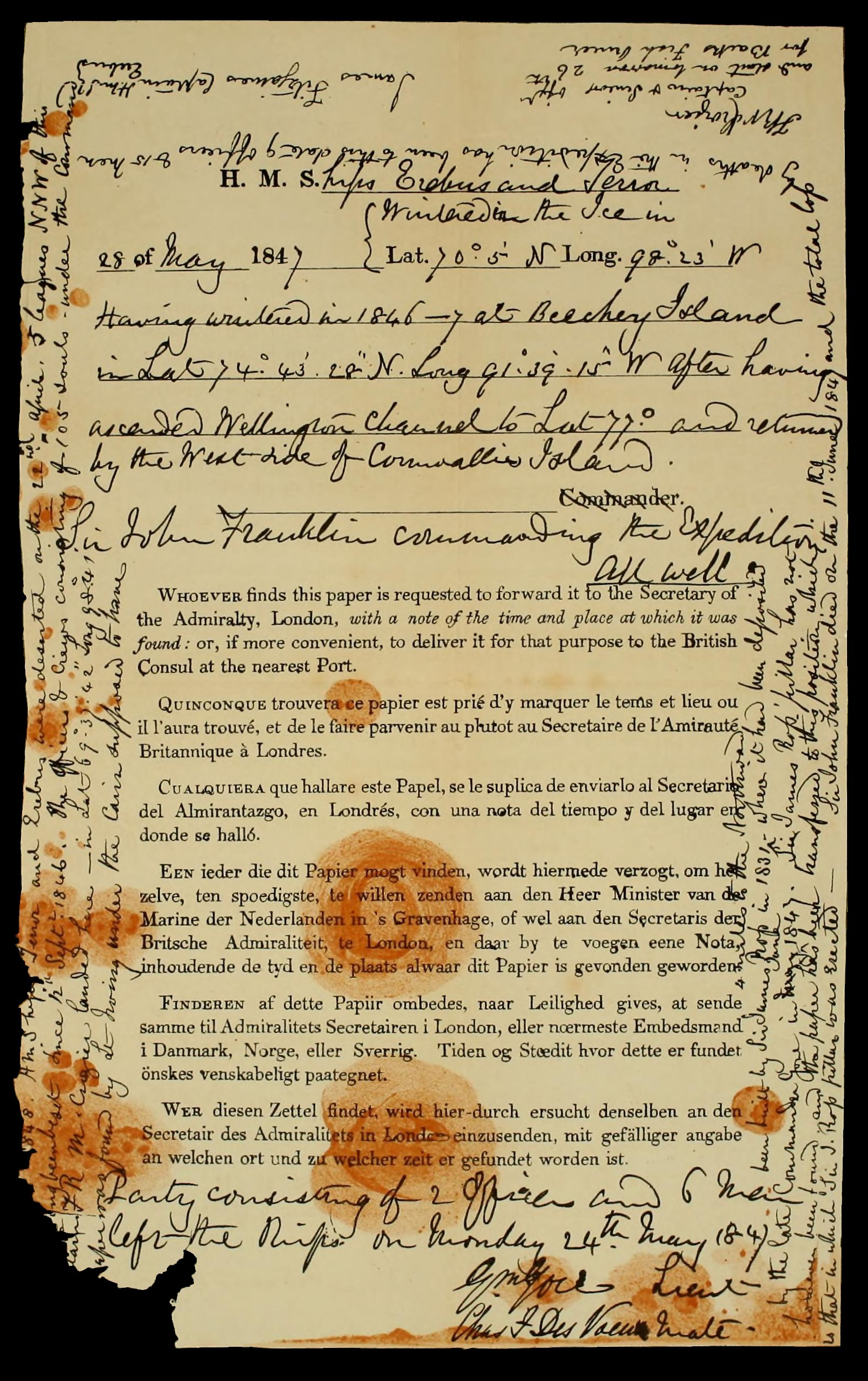
The "Victory Point" note.

== Discovery and identification of remains ==
The site of Fitzjames's death in Erebus Bay also contained a ship's boat. The boat and the human remains were first found by Inuit in 1861, and they reported that cannibalism had taken place there.

The site was rediscovered by Anne Keenleyside in 1993. The site is known to archaeologists as NgLj-2, and contained more than 400 bones belonging to 13 different members of the expedition, including Fitzjames.

In September 2024, researchers Douglas Stenton, Stephen Fratpietro, and Robert W. Park, from the University of Waterloo and Lakehead University, announced that they had positively identified a skeletal mandible as belonging to Fitzjames through DNA testing. An unbroken Y-chromosome DNA match was made from a living descendant of Fitzjames's great-grandfather James Gambier; the DNA donor, Nigel Gambier of Bury St Edmunds, is second cousin five times removed to Fitzjames. By doing genealogical research, historian Fabiënne Tetteroo determined that Nigel Gambier was an eligible match for Fitzjames. Tetteroo contacted Nigel Gambier and he agreed to provide the DNA sample that conclusively identified Fitzjames. Fitzjames' mandible shows signs of cut marks consistent with cannibalism.

Fitzjames is the highest-ranking member of the expedition to be identified as of 2024, and the second to be positively identified by DNA testing, the first being Erebus engineer John Gregory in 2021. Fitzjames is the first expedition member to be identified as a victim of cannibalism.

== Legacy ==
After the disappearance of the Franklin Expedition, Fitzjames' loss was recorded on various monuments to it, such as one statue at Waterloo Place in London. He was idolised by Sir Clements Markham as the beau ideal of an Arctic officer. Furthermore, he may have inadvertently acted as a model for Captain Robert Falcon Scott.

The only overt tribute to Fitzjames was in a family record 'The Story of the Gambiers', written in 1924 for private circulation by Mrs. Cuthbert Heath, a descendant of Sir James Gambier and published in 1924, in which Mrs. Heath wrote:

At this point mention must be made of a Gambier who bore the 'bar sinister', but is worthy to rank with the most distinguished of the legitimate kinsman. Sir James Gambier, Ambassador to the Brazils, had a natural son, James FitzJames, RN, well known to the Gambier family, who styled him the 'Knight of Snowden'. As Captain of HMS Erebus, he accompanied Sir John Franklin on his disastrous attempt to discover the North West Passage in 1845, and shared his leader's fate. His signature appears on one of the last entries of the great explorer's log-book, and his name stands in the place of honour next to that of Sir John Franklin on the well-known monument in Carlton House Terrace.

== In popular culture ==
James Fitzjames appears as a character in the 2007 novel, The Terror by Dan Simmons, a fictionalized account of Franklin's lost expedition, as well as the 2018 television adaptation, where he is portrayed by Tobias Menzies.

== See also ==
- List of people who disappeared mysteriously at sea
- Personnel of Franklin's lost expedition
