= Arctic Research Foundation =

The Arctic Research Foundation (ARF) is a private, nonprofit organization based in Canada. Federally incorporated in 2011, ARF works with Indigenous and northern communities, non-governmental organizations (NGOs), government, private corporations and academia to facilitate science research and community initiatives.

ARF’s mandate is to find innovative and flexible solutions to the unique challenges that are ever-present in the Arctic.

By developing effective science-community partnerships and physical infrastructure initiatives, ARF aims to contribute to the economic, social and spiritual well-being of communities, provide important and timely information on how and why the environment is changing, and inform systems-based, adaptive co-management approaches to climate adaptation.

== History ==
ARF was founded in 2011 by Jim Balsillie, former co-CEO of Research in Motion, and Waterloo-area businessman, Tim MacDonald, to assist Parks Canada's search for HMS Terror and HMS Erebus.

English explorer Sir John Franklin set sail in search of the Northwest Passage in 1845. HMS Erebus, HMS Terror and crew were last seen by Inuit near King William Island and never returned to England. Their disappearance prompted a 170-year search for Franklin's lost expedition.

After seeing foreign vessels searching for the shipwrecks while flying over King William Island, Balsillie wanted to help bolster the Canadian efforts to locate the lost ships. After forming ARF, Balsillie and MacDonald decided to refurbish an Atlantic Canadian fishing vessel, the RV Martin Bergmann, and make it available to Parks Canada's archaeologists.

=== Franklin's lost expedition ===
A Parks Canada led expedition located the Hecla-class bomb vessel, HMS Erebus, in September 2014 after Inuit identified the search area.

In September 2016, the ARF announced the discovery of the wreck of the Royal Navy's long-lost HMS Terror off the south-west coast of King William Island in Terror Bay, which was abandoned in 1848 during Sir John Franklin's ill-fated voyage through the Northwest Passage. ARF spokesperson, Adrian Schimnowski, said the wreck was found in nearly pristine condition in about 24 m (80 ft) of water, with most windowpanes still intact. Intending to search about 100 km (62 mi) further north the RV Bergmann sailed into Terror Bay on the advice of Sammy Kogvik, a resident of Gjoa Haven. Kogvik, and other Inuit from Gjoa Haven had reported over several years that there was a ship in the bay. Using a sonar scanner they were able to locate the ship.

The Royal Canadian Navy assisted ARF members in finding the wreck of HMS Terror, with ARF founder Jim Balsillie thanking the Navy for its efforts saying, "This historic discovery could not have happened without the Royal Canadian Navy".

Due to its Arctic home port, ARF's vessel, the RV Martin Bergmann, was responsible for at least 80 percent of territory surveyed during the search.

== Current operations ==
When the search for HMS Terror and HMS Erebus concluded, Balsillie and MacDonald saw opportunities to expand the foundation in order to generate broader public interest in the Arctic and challenges faced in the region. ARF refocused its efforts on developing partnerships and infrastructure to support initiatives including food security, climate change and economic development. Since 2011, ARF has made possible dozens of scientific missions and contributed to many cultural initiatives in Arctic regions with the operation of research vessels, remote mobile laboratories and community growing pods.

== Research vessels ==
ARF maintains and operates five research vessels: the RV Martin Bergmann, the RV William Kennedy, and the RV Jenny Pierre, the RV Tiriarnaq, and the RV Nahidik. These vessels support numerous science and community programs across Canada's Arctic regions.

=== RV Martin Bergmann ===
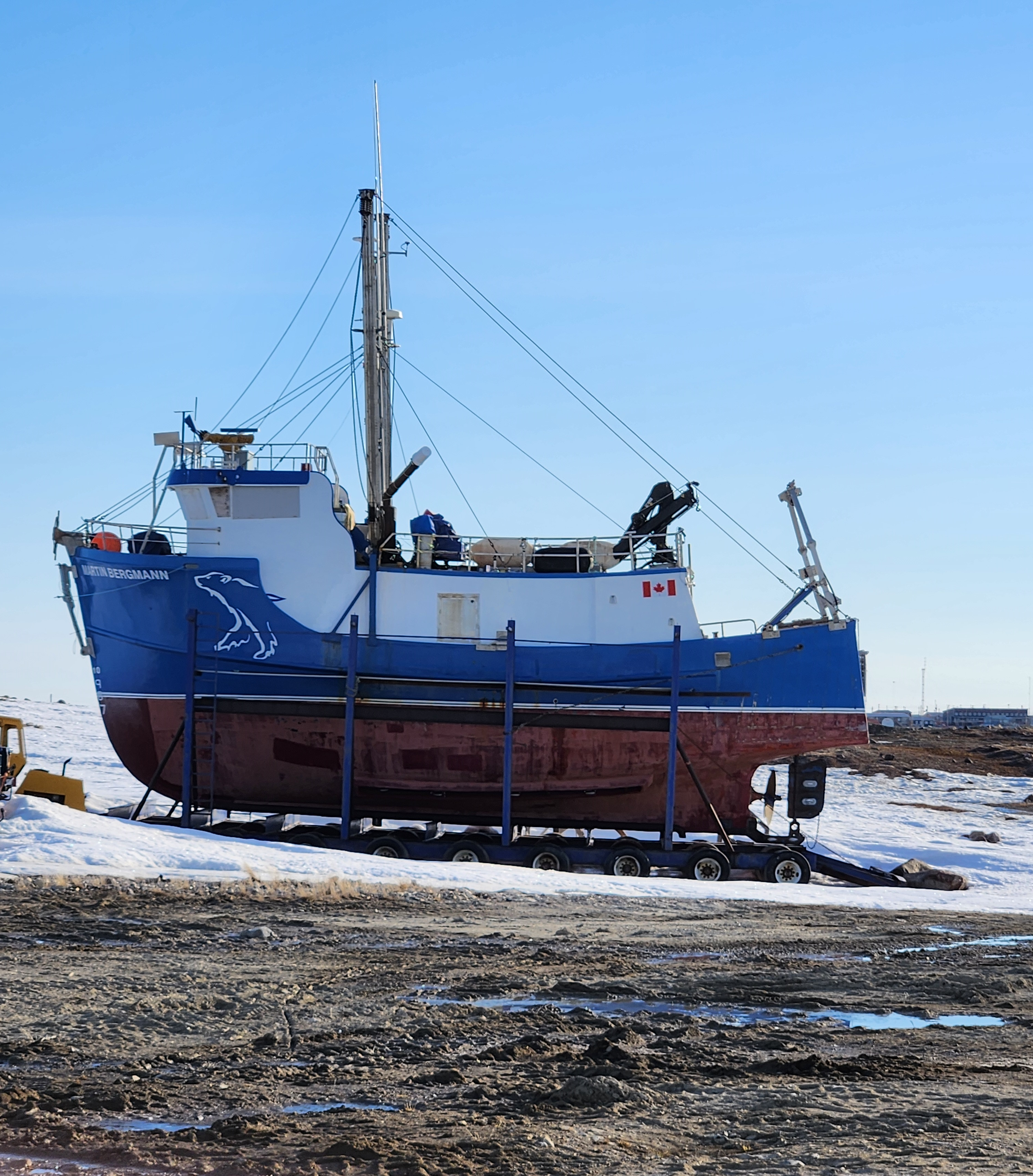
The RV Martin Bergmann on shore in Cambridge Bay for the winter

The RV Martin Bergmann (length 18.42 m (60.4 ft) beam 5.68 m (18.6 ft), draft 3.43 m (11.3 ft)) is a repurposed Newfoundland fishing trawler stationed in Cambridge Bay, Nunavut and is operational during the ice free months of the year. The Martin Bergmann is used for scientific research, archaeological exploration and mapping waterways around Victoria Island.

=== RV William Kennedy ===
The RV William Kennedy (length 20 m (66 ft), beam 8.99 metres (29.5 ft), draft 4.1 m (13 ft)) is Canada's first research vessel dedicated exclusively to Hudson Bay. The vessel is a refitted Atlantic Canadian fishing vessel operated by the Arctic Research Foundation in partnership with the University of Manitoba and the Churchill Marine Observatory, a multidisciplinary research facility located in Churchill, Manitoba. The William Kennedy hosts a variety of researchers and scientists, including oceanographers, geneticists and biologists who partner with local communities to conduct scientific research throughout Hudson Bay.

=== RV Nahidik ===
The Nahidik (length 54 m (177 ft), draft 2.0 m (6 ft 7 in)) is a shallow draft research vessel operating in Great Slave Lake and throughout the Mackenzie River in the Northwest Territories. It is the largest vessel in the ARF fleet measuring 54 m (177 ft) in length. The former Canadian Coast Guard vessel was refitted in partnership with the Government of the Northwest Territories in 2019 and has been operational since. The vessel has supported various science projects including a study of Great Slave Lake's bathymetry, geological surveys of the area and a youth science expedition in partnership with Northern Youth Leadership.

=== RV Tiriarnaq ===
Stationed in Victoria, British Columbia, the RV Tiriarnaq (length 19.2 m (63 ft), beam 5.18 metres (17.0 ft), draft 2.62 m (8 ft 7 in)), was a former Canadian Coast Guard vessel until 2019, when it was refitted to support science research. It is expected that the vessel will be stationed in the Northwest Territories in the future and specialize in supporting near coastal research.

=== RV Jenny Pierre ===
The RV Jenny Pierre is a vessel co-owned by the community of Gjoa Haven and ARF, in the Kitikmeot Region of Nunavut. Community members reached out to ARF to refurbish the former converted lobster boat to meet the growing research needs of local groups, including its hunter and trapper organization.

== Mobile labs ==
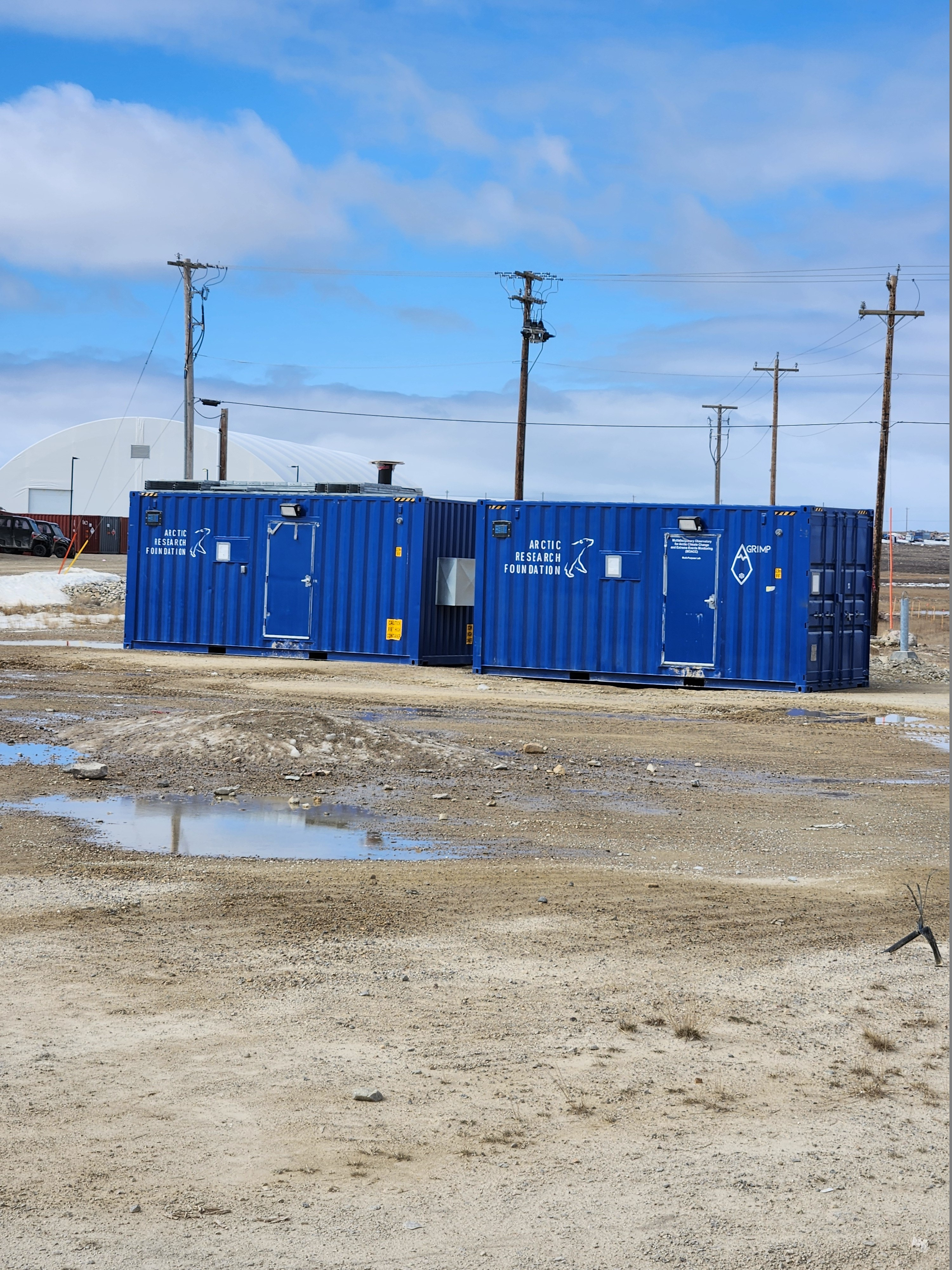
ARF containers outside the Canadian High Arctic Research Station in Cambridge Bay

ARF operates four mobile science labs and one Plant Production and Research Pod, which is located in Gjoa Haven, Nunavut.

The mobile labs are examples of shipping container architecture as they are built out of shipping containers. Each building is powered by either renewable energy sources, such as wind turbines or solar panels, or can be hooked into the communities power grid. The labs are insulated, heated, provided with toilets and water purifiers. In addition they can communicate via satellite.

The mobile labs can be moved across remote Arctic environments, either by land or by sea.

=== Naurvik ===
ARF's first Mobile Plant Production and Research Pod is operating in the Northern community of Gjoa Haven, Nunavut. Local residents named the project "Naurvik", which means "the growing place." There are three containers that have been repurposed as a "Grow Pod", "Utility Pod", and "Power Pod".

The Plant Production and Research Pod, which utilizes hydroponics is an adaptation of the mobile lab, further developed to grow fresh produce and test new agriculture technologies. It operates from three shipping containers powered by solar panels and wind turbines with a generator for backup when the wind and sun both fall short.

First becoming operational in 2019, Naurvik has harvested micro-greens, lettuce, peas, corn, and strawberries that are distributed to community elders and other residents. The crops harvested in the pod are chosen by the community.

The project is a collaboration with the Hamlet of Gjoa Haven, ARF, Agriculture and Agri-Food Canada, the National Research Council and the Canadian Space Agency.

== Arctic Focus ==
Arctic Focus is a media platform hosted and developed by ARF. Established in August 2018, Arctic Focus publishes stories from across the Arctic authored by researchers, northern residents, explorers and journalists. It aims to foster education about Arctic regions while also offering a platform for Northern based creators and writers to publish their work.

== See also ==
- List of Arctic research programs
