= David C. Woodman =

Canadian mariner, author, and arctic researcher

David Charles Woodman (born 1956) is a Canadian mariner, author, and arctic researcher. He is known for his research on Franklin's Lost Expedition, having led or participated in nine expeditions to King William Island between 1992 and 2004, searching for relics, records, and the wrecks of the ships HMS Terror and HMS Erebus, and establishing the important role of Inuit oral testimony in the search.

== Biography ==
Woodman was born in London, Ontario, and grew up sailing and wreck-diving on the Great Lakes. He studied as an undergraduate at the University of Toronto. In his first year, he found a reprinted copy of Voyage of the ‘Fox’ in the Arctic Seas by Francis Leopold McClintock, which inspired him to search for the shipwrecks of HMS Terror and HMS Erebus and become the first person to dive at the sites. He studied Franklin Expedition documents at the Scott Polar Research Institute in Cambridge and the National Maritime Museum in London, and received documents from the Smithsonian, including unpublished Inuit testimony collected by Charles Francis Hall. He was the first person to publish a report on the testimony of Supunger, an Inuk hunter from the Boothia Peninsula who told Hall he had found an underground burial vault on King William Island while searching for items left by Franklin with his uncle in 1863.

After leaving university he served as an officer with the Royal Canadian Navy for eleven years, specializing in navigation and submarines. Following his military service he obtained a civilian Master’s certificate and served as assistant harbour master in Prince Rupert, British Columbia.

Woodman served a senior master for BC Ferries until retirement in 2016. He lives in Port Coquitlam, British Columbia. He has a wife and two daughters.

== King William Island search expeditions ==
Using the Inuit testimony as a guide, Woodman led and participated in search expeditions on King William Island. In 1992 and 1993 he organized airborne magnetometer surveys of an area near Grant Point where the testimony of the only Inuk eye witness, named Puhtoorak, indicated one of Sir John Franklin's wrecks had sunk. The following two summers he led land searches on northern King William Island, searching for vaults and landmarks related to the Franklin Expedition as detailed in the stories of an Inuk hunter named Supunger, as part of 'Project Supunger'. These projects identified many of the key Franklin landmarks along the coast, including the grave of an officer identified as Terror Lieutenant John Irving, originally found in 1879 by Heinrich Klutschak of the Frederick Schwatka arctic expedition, which Woodman laid down in to ascertain its size. In May 1999 he returned to the area to experience the landscape as it would have been during the Franklin retreat.

In 1997 he again shifted to searching for the wreck, joining the Eco-Nova Franklin expedition as search coordinator, again filling that role in 2000 for the St. Roch II expedition mounted by the RCMP. Between 2001 and 2004 Woodman's team employed a search strategy including a magnetometer on a qamutiik, drawn by a ski-doo, with the hope of detecting the metallic former railway boilers used on the two ships, as well as sonar booms and depth soundings, to reduce the search area where the ships could be located. They searched the southwestern corner of Wilmot and Crampton Bay, and found tent sites, relics, and a skull. He began consulting with Parks Canada in 2010, whose annual searches with more substantial and predictable funding resulted in the discovery of Franklin's ships HMS Erebus (2014) and HMS Terror (2016).

== Influence ==
Woodman's collection and support of Inuit testimony in researching the Franklin Expedition has led to multiple discoveries. Douglas Stenton, an archaeologist with Parks Canada, adopted Woodman's belief that "all Inuit stories concerning white men should have a discoverable factual basis" when assessing possible Franklin-related archaeological sites in and around King William Island. While Woodman himself did not find the shipwrecks, his searches and insistence on the veracity of Inuit oral testimony did culminate in Parks Canada's discovery of Erebus in 2014.

Woodman has given talks about Inuit oral testimony and the Franklin expedition, and is recognized as an authority on the subject. He has been featured in various documentaries about Franklin, and is a major subject in two books on the search. In 2015, Woodman was a recipient of the Erebus Medal, struck by the Royal Canadian Geographical Society to recognize all participants in the discovery of HMS Erebus, including those in the field and those who worked behind the scenes.

== Books ==
- Unravelling the Franklin Mystery: Inuit Testimony, McGill-Queen's University Press, 1991. (ISBN 0773508333)
- Strangers Among Us, McGill-Queen's University Press, 1995. (ISBN 0773513485)
