= Terror Bay =

Bay in Nunavut, Canada

- ᐊᒥᑦᕈᖅ (Inuktitut); Amitruq (Inuktitut)
- Location in Nunavut
- Location: King William Island
- Coordinates: 68°52′N 98°57′W
- Ocean/sea sources: Arctic Ocean
- Basin countries: Canada

Terror Bay (Inuktitut: ᐊᒥᑦᕈᖅ, Amitruq) is an Arctic waterway in the Kitikmeot Region, Nunavut, Canada. It is located on the southwestern side of King William Island. The entrance to the bay is marked by Fitzjames Island on the west and Irving Island to the east. The bay opens to Queen Maud Gulf.

== Association with John Franklin ==
The bay was one of a series of landmarks along the waters explored by John Franklin during his lost expedition between 1845 and 1848. The bay has the same name as HMS Terror, one of the two ships of the expedition. The ships entered Baffin Bay in 1845 on their quest to find a Northwest Passage, and were abandoned sometime in 1848.

Terror Bay was officially named by the Geographical Names Board of Canada in 1910. Inuit oral history provided clues about the ships' demise, but the precise locations of the wrecks were not known for over 160 years.

In 2016, Arctic Research Foundation researchers on board the Martin Bergmann announced that they had found the wreck of HMS Terror in Terror Bay. They had been led there by a tip from Inuk crewman Sammy Kogvik, from Gjoa Haven, who reported seeing a mast protruding from the ice in Terror Bay during a hunting trip in 2010. The wreck of the other ship of the lost expedition, HMS Erebus, had previously been found in 2014.

Following the rediscovery of the Terror and HMS Erebus the Nunavut Field Unit of Parks Canada restricted access to a rectangular area of the bay, as part of the Wrecks of HMS Erebus and HMS Terror National Historic Site. The area runs from Point E (68°54′25.45″N 98°59′42.07″W) to Point F (68°54′25.24″N 98°51′29.08″W) to Point G (68°48′46.23″N 98°51′31.25″W) to Point H (68°48′46.44″N 98°59′42.15″W).
