= Francis Crozier =

Royal Navy officer and explorer (1796–1848?)

Captain Francis Crozier FRS FRAS
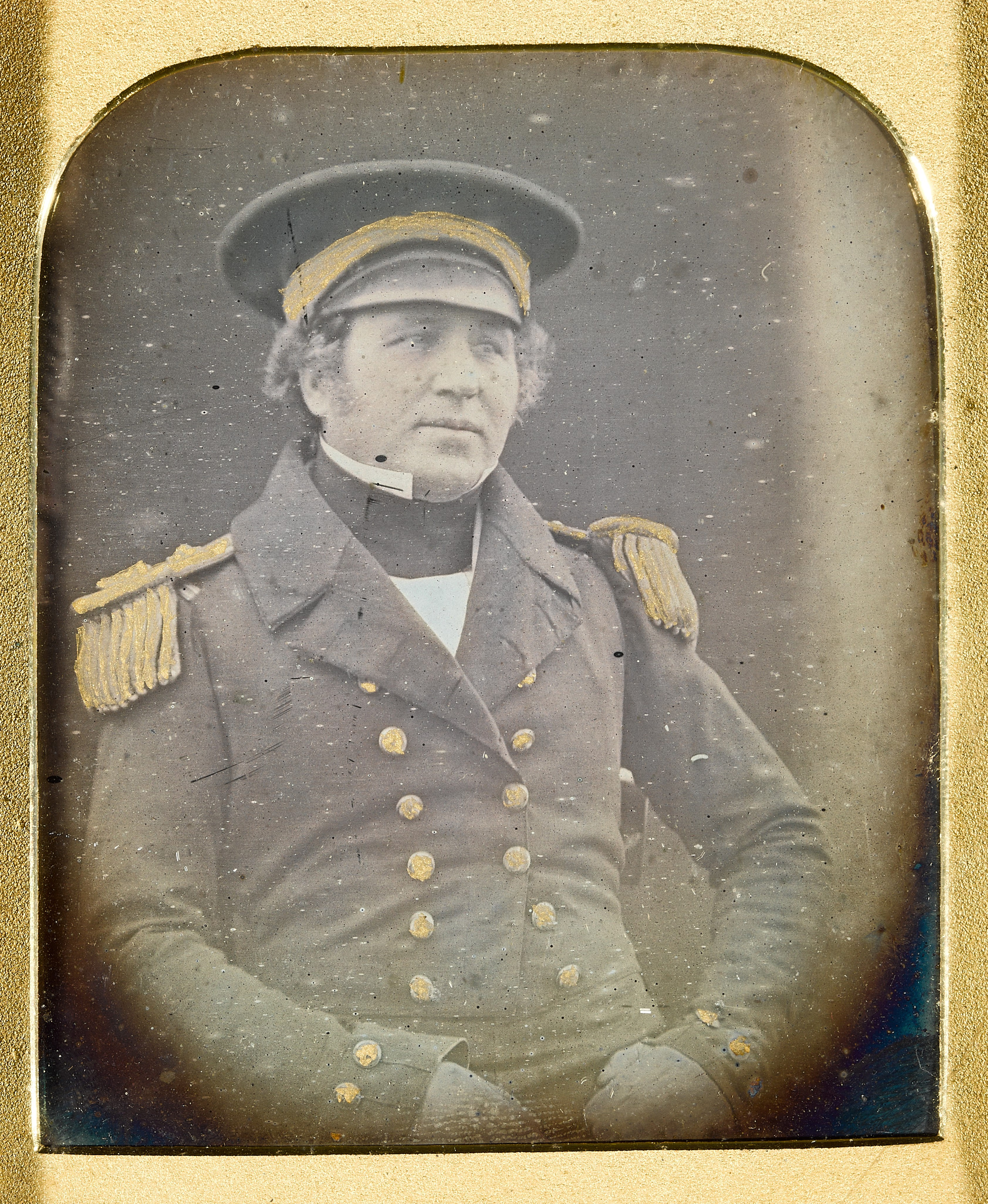
- Crozier in 1845
- Born: 17 October 1796; Banbridge, County Down
- Disappeared: 26 April 1848 (aged 51); King William Island, North-Western Territory (now Nunavut, Canada)
- Military career
- Allegiance: United Kingdom
- Branch: Royal Navy
- Service years: 1810–1848
- Rank: Captain

Captain Francis Rawdon Moira Crozier FRS FRAS (/ˈkroʊʒər/; 17 October 1796 – disappeared 26 April 1848) was a Royal Navy officer and explorer who participated in six expeditions to the Arctic and Antarctic. In 1843, he became a fellow of the Royal Society for his scientific work during his expeditions. Later, he was second-in-command to Sir John Franklin and captain of HMS Terror during what would become Franklin's lost expedition, to discover the Northwest Passage in the Canadian Arctic, ending with the loss of all 129 crewmen.

Many places in the Arctic and Antarctic are named after him. He, with James Clark Ross and Richard Moody, was also responsible for selecting the location of the capital of the Falkland Islands, Port Stanley, in 1843.

== Early life ==
Francis Crozier was born in the County Down town of Banbridge in Ulster, the northern province in Ireland. He was the eleventh of thirteen children, and the fifth son of solicitor George Crozier, who named him after his friend Francis Rawdon-Hastings, 2nd Earl of Moira. Crozier attended school locally in Banbridge, with his brothers William and Thomas, and lived with his family in Avonmore House which his father had built in 1792, in the centre of Banbridge.

== Naval service ==
At the age of 13, Crozier volunteered for the Royal Navy and joined HMS Hamadryad in June 1810. In 1812, he served on HMS Briton and visited Pitcairn Island in 1814, where he met the last surviving mutineers from HMS Bounty. In 1817, he received his certificate as mate; in 1818, he served on HMS Doterel during a trip to the Cape of Good Hope.

Crozier joined Captain William Parry's second Arctic expedition to traverse the Northwest Passage in 1821. He served as midshipman on Parry's HMS Fury, which was accompanied by Captain Lyon's HMS Hecla. He returned to the North with Parry a second time in 1824, this time on Hecla. The journey resulted in the sinking of Fury off Somerset Island. Crozier was promoted to lieutenant in 1826, and a year later, he once more joined Parry in his attempt to reach the North Pole; ultimately a futile endeavour.

During his voyages, Crozier became a close friend and confidant of the explorer James Clark Ross. He was elected to become a Fellow of the Royal Astronomical Society in 1827, after conducting valuable astronomical and magnetic studies on his three expeditions with Parry.

He was appointed to the frigate HMS Stag in 1831, and served off the coast of Portugal during the Liberal Wars, the country's civil war. Crozier joined Clark Ross as second-in-command of HMS Cove in 1835, to assist in the search for 12 lost British whaling ships in the Arctic. Crozier was appointed to the rank of commander in 1837.

=== Ross expedition ===
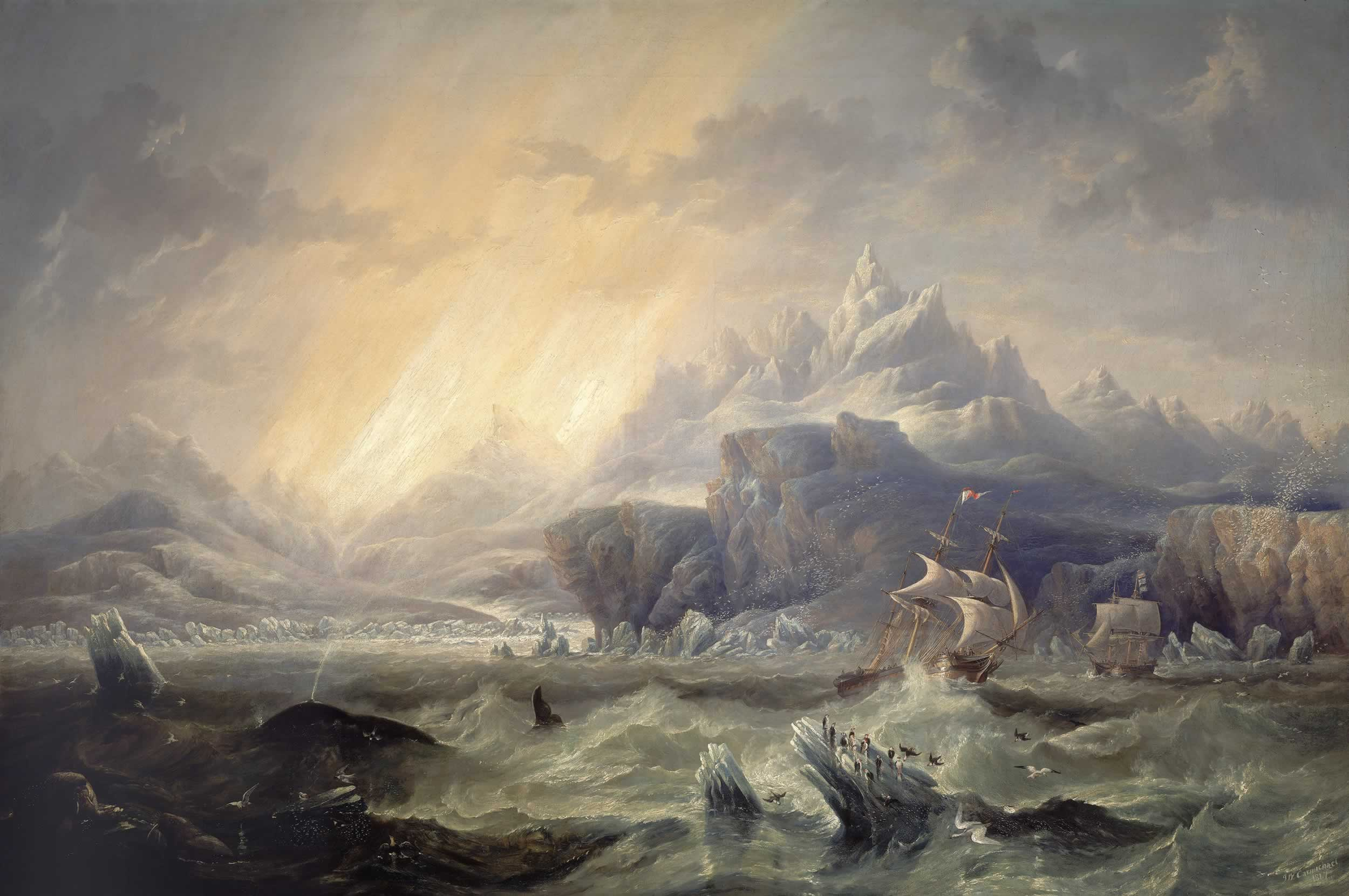
Erebus and Terror in the Antarctic, by James Wilson Carmichael. National Maritime Museum, London.

In 1839, Crozier again joined James Clark Ross on the Ross expedition, as second-in-command of a four-year voyage to explore the Antarctic continent in the ships HMS Erebus and HMS Terror. Crozier commanded Terror, and was appointed to the rank of captain in 1841. Erebus and Terror returned in 1843, having made the most significant penetration of the Antarctic pack ice and discovered large parts of the continent—including the Ross Sea and Ross Island, Mount Erebus and the Ross Ice Shelf.

Crozier was elected a Fellow of the Royal Society in 1843, in recognition of his outstanding work on magnetism.

=== Franklin expedition ===
In 1845, Crozier joined Captain Sir John Franklin as captain of the Terror on the Franklin expedition to traverse the last unnavigated section of the Northwest Passage. Crozier himself was offered the command of the expedition, but, with "characteristic modesty", he deferred to Franklin. After Franklin's death in June 1847, Crozier took over. His fate and those of the other expedition members remained a mystery until 1859, when a note written by Crozier and James Fitzjames, captain of the Erebus, was discovered on King William Island during an expedition led by Francis McClintock. Dated 25 April 1848, the note indicated that the ships—stuck in thick pack ice—had been abandoned. Nine officers, including Sir John Franklin, and 15 crewmen had died. Also stated was their intention, on 26 April, to set out on foot for Back's Great Fish River on the Canadian mainland.

Inuit rumours collected between 1852 and 1858 indicate that Crozier and one other expedition member might have been seen in the Baker Lake area, about 400 km (250 mi) to the south. McClintock and later searchers found relics, graves and human remains of the Franklin crew on Beechey Island, King William Island and the northern coast of the Canadian mainland.

Farley Mowat, a Canadian writer known for exaggeration and who has been criticized multiple times for writing fiction posing as fact, with Frank Banfield of the National Museum of Canada comparing his book on the habits of wolves to being as factual on the topic as Little Red Riding Hood, supposedly found "a very ancient cairn, not of normal Eskimo construction" sometime in 1948, inside of which he said were fragments of a hardwood box with dovetail joints. It is worth noting that later research conducted by David C. Woodman was unable uncover any evidence of the supposed Inuit reports Mowat was working from nor was he able to find the cairn itself.

==== Ships' location ====
In 2014, the Victoria Strait Expedition found two items on Hat Island, in the Queen Maud Gulf, near King William Island; part of a boat-launching davit bearing the stamps of two Royal Navy broad arrows, and a wooden object, possibly a plug for a deck hawse, the iron pipe through which the ship's chain cable would descend into the chain locker below. The expedition located one of Franklin's ships, preserved in reasonably good condition. The wreck lies at the bottom of the eastern portion of Queen Maud Gulf, west of O'Reilly Island and has been confirmed to be that of Erebus. In 2016, a well-preserved ship matching Terror's description was located in Terror Bay, off the southern coast of King William Island. The exploration of the wrecks continues.

== Legacy ==
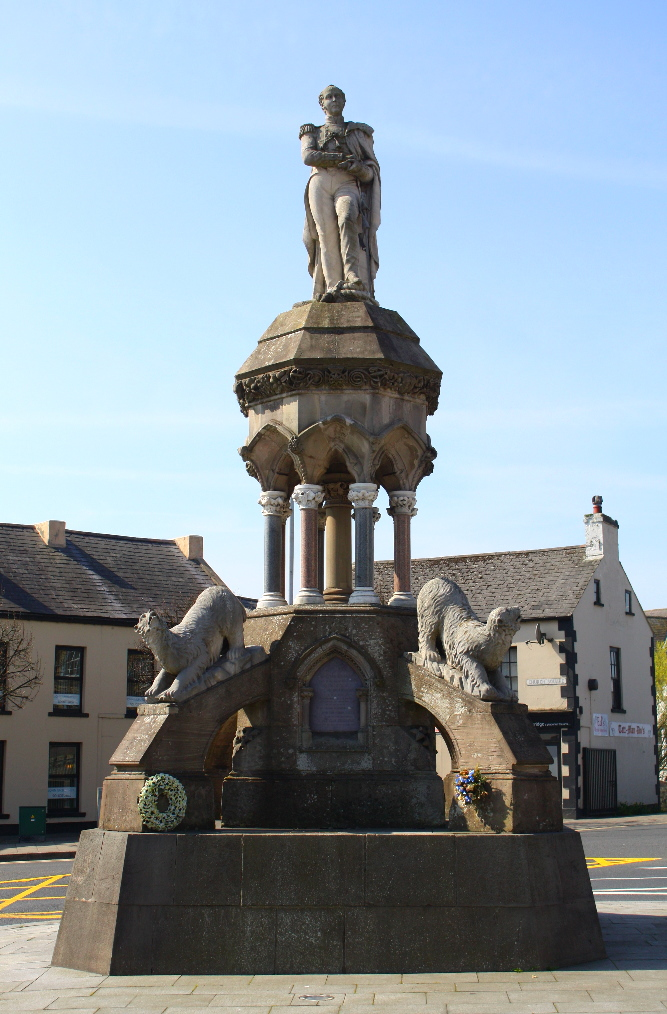
Francis Crozier monument in Banbridge, County Down, with polar bear supporters.

In January 2008, Crozier's home town of Banbridge hosted a memorial event, which included a service of remembrance and thanksgiving at the Church of the Holy Trinity, which was attended by more than a hundred descendants of Crozier and other officers of Franklin's lost expedition and those who searched for it, along with the chairman of Banbridge Council, and several Arctic historians, including Michael Smith and Russell Potter.

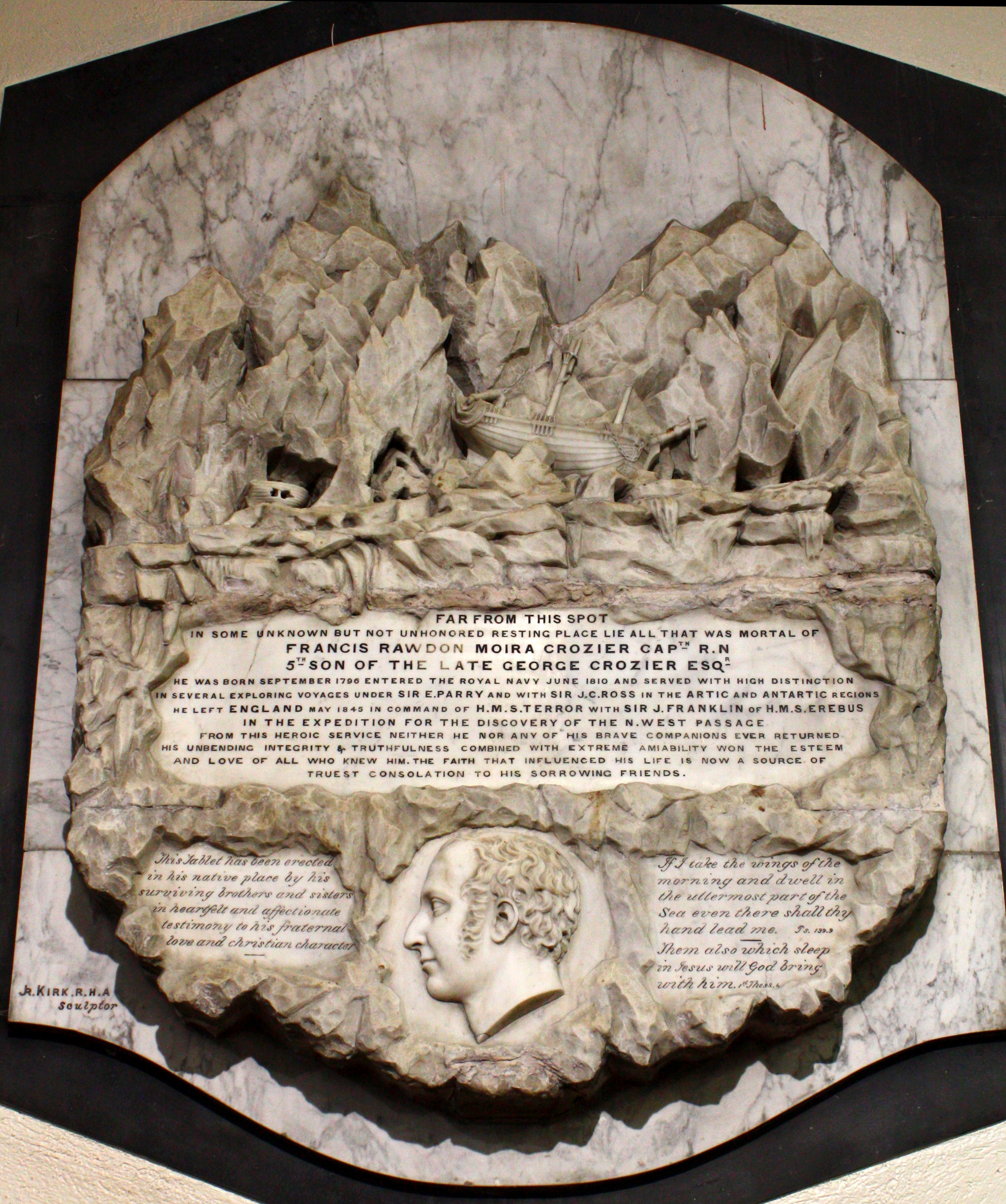
Francis Crozier memorial inside Seapatrick Church, Banbridge

A memorial to Sir John Franklin and his men was erected by order of Parliament in 1858, in the Painted Hall of London's Greenwich Hospital. It was moved to Greenwich Royal Naval College's chapel in 1937, and was re-erected in the entrance of the former college in late 2009. At the service of thanksgiving on 29 October 2009, polar travellers and descendants of the expedition's crew celebrated their contributions.

=== Namesake ===
Geographical features named after Crozier include:

- Cape Crozier on the eastern side of Ross Island, Antarctica
- Cape Crozier on the western flank of King William Island, in the Canadian Arctic
- Cape Crozier at the western entrance of the Bay of Mercy on Banks Island, in the Canadian Arctic
- Crozier Strait which lies between Cornwallis and Bathurst Islands, in the Canadian Arctic
- Crozier River, near Fury and Hecla Strait in the Canadian Arctic
- Crozier Point on Spitsbergen, in the Arctic north of Norway
- Crozier Channel, to the north of Banks Island in the Canadian Arctic
- Crozier Island in the Kennedy Channel, between Greenland and Ellesmere Island
- The lunar crater Crozier, located at 13.5° S, 50.8° E on the Moon's near side
- Crozier Place, a street in Stanley, Falkland Islands
- The hydrographic survey vessel HMS Crozier was named after him in 1919
- Francis Street in the suburb of Keilor Park in Melbourne, Australia
- Mount Crozier, a mountain in the French Kerguelen Islands

=== In popular culture ===
Francis Crozier appears as a character and the primary narrator of the 2007 best-selling novel, The Terror by Dan Simmons, a fictionalized account of Franklin's lost expedition, as well as the 2018 television adaptation, where Crozier is portrayed by Jared Harris.

Crozier was adapted into Marvel Comics by writer Bill Mantlo in his run on the Canadian superhero team-book Alpha Flight, as the supervillain Pestilence.
