= Douglas Stenton =

Canadian archaeologist

Douglas Stenton (born c. 1953) is a Canadian archaeologist, educator and civil servant. He served as Director of Heritage for the Nunavut Department of Culture and Heritage and played an important role in the finding of HMS Erebus from Franklin's lost expedition of 1845.

The son of Kenneth and Margaret Stenton, he was born in Chatham, Ontario. He received a bachelor's degree from the University of Windsor, a MA in anthropology from Trent University in 1980 and a PhD in anthropology from the University of Alberta in 1989. Stenton is an adjunct professor in the Department of Anthropology at the University of Waterloo.

He served as executive director of the Inuit Heritage Trust and was the first archaeologist working for the government of Nunavut before being named Director of Heritage in 2002. He was named to the Order of Canada in 2017 for his "enduring contributions to the preservation of Canada's northern heritage".

Stenton's team has developed facial reconstructions from the skulls of two members of Franklin's expedition in the hopes of identifying them. The team will also pursue DNA analysis. Some DNA samples apparently lacked Y chromosomes, suggesting the possibility of women disguised as men among Franklin's crew. However, a more likely explanation is deterioration of those DNA samples.
