= HMS Terror (1813) =

British warship and polar exploration ship

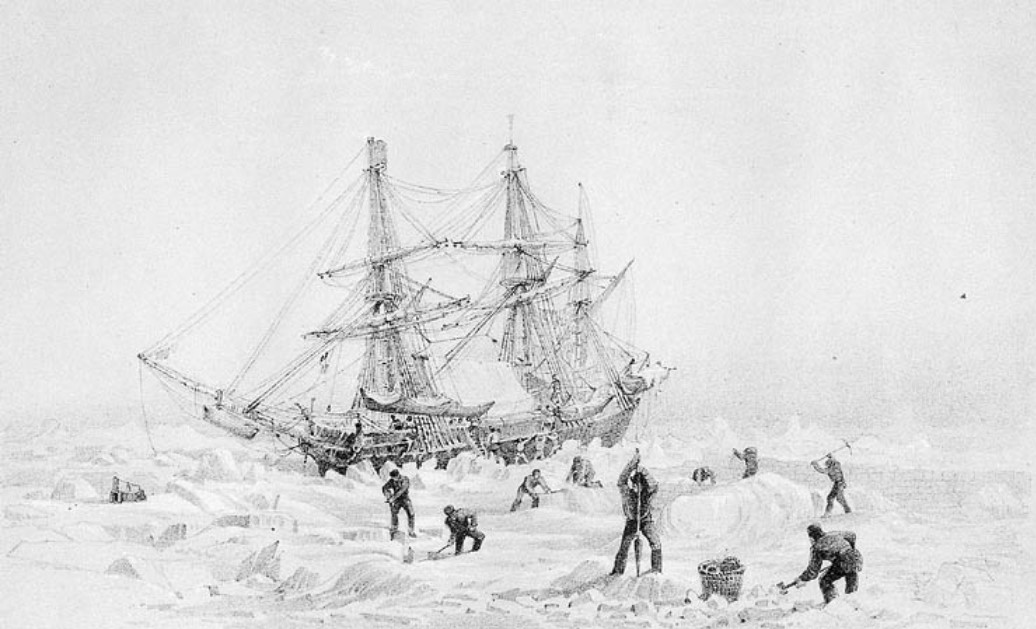
- HMS Terror in the Arctic

History

United Kingdom
- Name: Terror
- Ordered: 30 March 1812
- Builder: Robert Davy, Topsham, Devon
- Laid down: September 1812
- Launched: 29 June 1813
- Completed: By 31 July 1813
- Fate: Abandoned 22 April 1848, King William Island
- Wreck discovered: 3 September 2016, Terror Bay

General characteristics
- Class & type: Vesuvius-class bomb vessel
- Tons burthen: 325 (bm)
- Length: 102 ft (31 m)
- Beam: 27 ft (8.2 m)
- Installed power: 30 Nominal horsepower
- Propulsion: Sails; steam engine
- Complement: 67
- Armament: 1 × 13 in (330 mm) mortar; 1 × 10 in (250 mm) mortar

National Historic Site of Canada
- Official name: Wrecks of HMS Erebus and HMS Terror National Historic Site
- Designated: 2019

HMS Terror was a specialised warship and a newly developed bomb vessel constructed for the Royal Navy in 1813. She participated in several battles of the War of 1812, including the Battle of Baltimore with the bombardment of Fort McHenry. She was converted into a polar exploration ship two decades later, and participated in George Back's Arctic expedition of 1836–1837, the successful Ross expedition to the Antarctic of 1839 to 1843, and Sir John Franklin's ill-fated attempt to force the Northwest Passage in 1845, during which she was lost with all hands along with HMS Erebus.

On 12 September 2016, the Arctic Research Foundation announced that the wreck of Terror had been found in Nunavut's Terror Bay, off the southwest coast of King William Island. The wreck was discovered 92 km (57 mi) south of the location where the ship was reported abandoned, and some 50 km (31 mi) from the wreck of HMS Erebus, discovered in September 2014.

== Early history and military service ==
HMS Terror was a Vesuvius-class bomb ship built over two years at the Davy shipyard in Topsham in south Devon, for the Royal Navy. Her deck was 31 m (102 ft) long, and the ship measured 325 tons burthen. The vessel was armed with two heavy mortars and ten cannon, and was launched in June 1813.

Terror saw service in the War of 1812 against the United States, during which the ships of the North America and West Indies Station of the Royal Navy blockaded the Atlantic ports of the United States and launched amphibious raids from its base in Bermuda, leading up to the 1814 Chesapeake campaign, a punitive expedition that included the Raid on Alexandria, the Battle of Bladensburg, and the Burning of Washington. Under the command of John Sheridan, she took part in the bombardment of Stonington, Connecticut, on 9–12 August 1814. She also fought in the Battle of Baltimore in September 1814 and participated in the bombardment of Fort McHenry; the latter attack inspired Francis Scott Key to write the poem that eventually became known as "The Star-Spangled Banner". In January 1815, still under Sheridan's command, Terror was involved in the Battle of Fort Peter and the attack on St. Marys, Georgia.

After the war, Terror was laid up until March 1828, when she was recommissioned for service in the Mediterranean Sea. She was removed from active service when she underwent repairs for damage suffered near Lisbon, Portugal.

== Early polar exploration service ==
In the mid-1830s, Terror was refitted as a polar exploration vessel. Her design as a bomb ship meant she had an unusually strong framework to resist the recoil of her heavy mortars; thus it was presumed she could withstand the pressure of polar sea ice, as well.

=== Back expedition ===
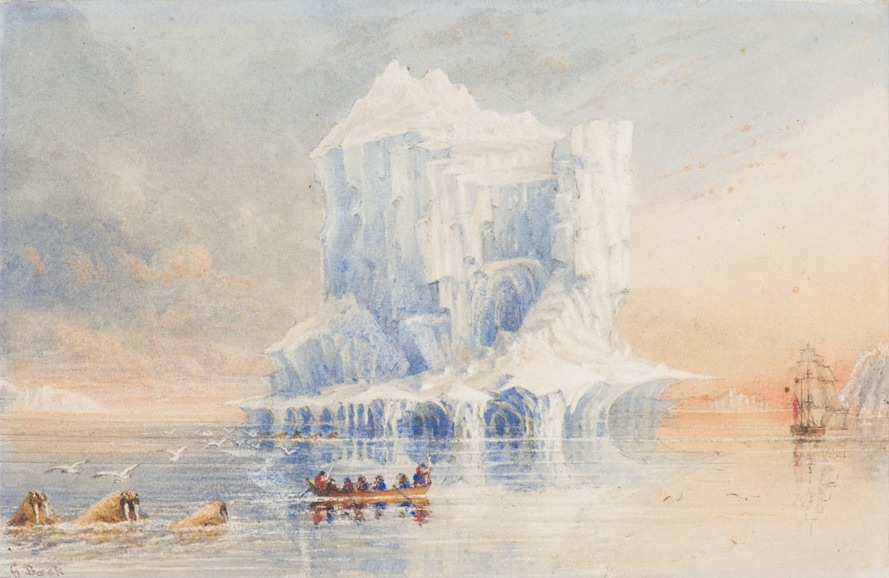
A painting by Admiral Sir George Back showing HMS Terror anchored near a cathedral-like iceberg in the waters around Baffin Island

In 1836, command of Terror was given to Captain George Back for an Arctic expedition to Hudson Bay. The expedition aimed to enter Repulse Bay, where it would send out landing parties to ascertain whether the Boothia Peninsula was an island or a peninsula. Terror was trapped by ice near Southampton Island, and did not reach Repulse Bay. At one point, the ice forced her 12 m (39 ft) up the face of a cliff. She was trapped in the ice for ten months. In the spring of 1837, an encounter with an iceberg further damaged the ship. She nearly sank on her return journey across the Atlantic, and was in a sinking condition by the time Back sailed her into Lough Swilly, before beaching her at Rathmullan, Co. Donegal, Ireland on 21 September.

The admiralty dispatched the shipwright, William McPherson Rice, to refloat and repair Terror sufficiently to enable her to sail to the naval shipyard at Chatham in Kent, where full repairs were carried out. Correspondence describing the repairs and the crew's sojourn in Rathmullan are held in the Royal Museums Greenwich collection. Back subsequently published a complete account of this voyage right up to the decommissioning of Terror in Chatham.

=== Ross expedition ===
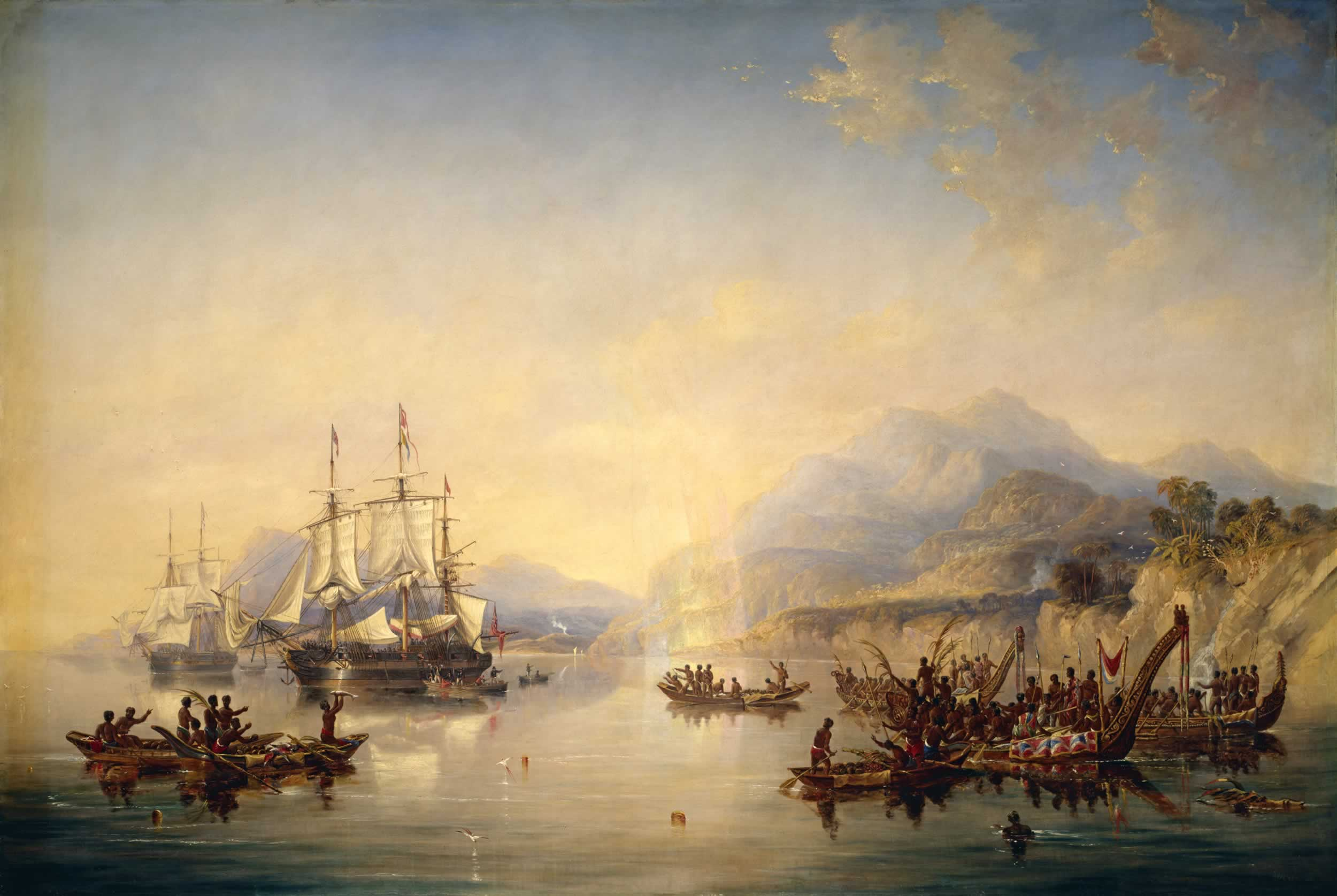
"Erebus" and "Terror" in New Zealand on the Ross expedition, August 1841, by John Wilson Carmichael

In 1839 Terror was assigned to a voyage to the Antarctic along with Erebus under the overall command of James Clark Ross. Francis Crozier was commander of Terror on this expedition, as well as second-in-command to Ross. The expedition spanned three seasons from 1840 to 1843 during which Terror and Erebus made three forays into Antarctic waters, traversing the Ross Sea twice, and sailing through the Weddell Sea southeast of the Falkland Islands. The extinct volcano Mount Terror on Ross Island was named after the ship by the expedition commander.

== Franklin expedition ==
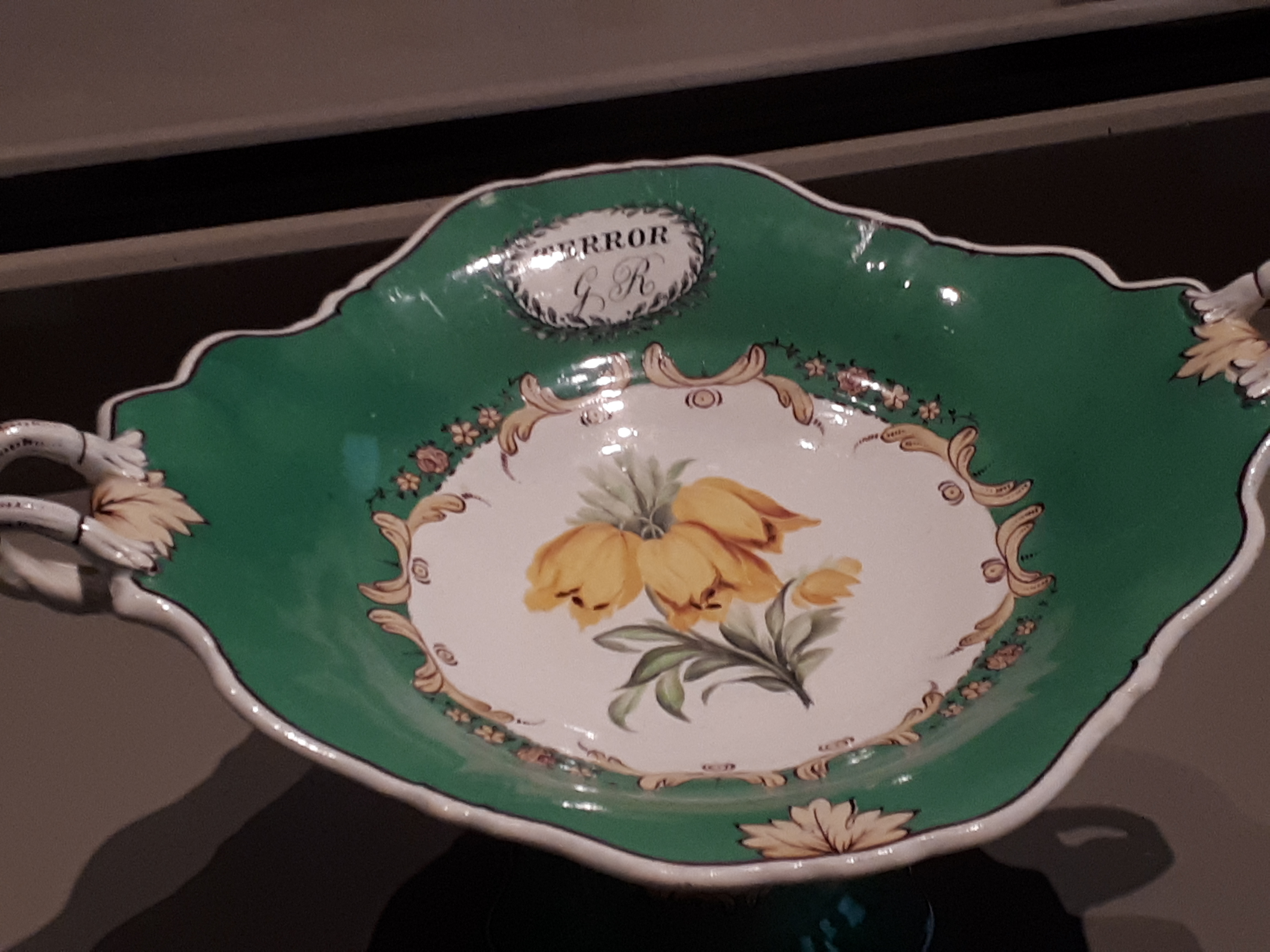
Sample of dishware carried by Terror, showing vessel name and the cypher for King George.

Before leaving on the Franklin expedition, both Erebus and Terror underwent heavy modifications for the journey. They were both outfitted with steam engines, consisting of former London and Greenwich Railway steam locomotives. Rated at 25 hp (19 kW), each could propel its ship at 4 kn (7.4 km/h). The pair of ships were among the first Royal Navy ships to have steam-powered engines and screw propellers. Twelve days' supply of coal was carried. Iron plating was added fore and aft on the ships' hulls to make them more resistant to pack ice, and their decks were cross-planked to distribute impact forces. Along with Erebus, Terror was stocked with supplies for their expedition, which included, among other items, two tons of tobacco, 8,000 tins of preserves, and 7,560 L (1,660 imp gal; 2,000 US gal) of liquor. Terror's library had 1,200 books, and the ship's berths were heated via ducts that connected them to the stove.

Their voyage to the Arctic was with Sir John Franklin in overall command of the expedition in Erebus, and Terror again under the command of Captain Francis Crozier. The expedition was ordered to gather magnetic data in the Arctic Archipelago and complete a crossing of the Northwest Passage, which had already been charted from both the east and west, but never entirely navigated. It was planned to last three years.

The expedition sailed from Greenhithe, Kent, on 19 May 1845, and the ships were last seen entering Baffin Bay in August 1845. The disappearance of the Franklin expedition set off a massive search effort in the Arctic and the broad circumstances of the expedition's fate were revealed during a series of expeditions between 1848 and 1866. Both ships had become icebound and were abandoned by their crews, all of whom died of exposure and starvation while trying to trek overland to Fort Resolution, a Hudson's Bay Company outpost 970 km (600 mi) to the southwest. Subsequent expeditions up until the late 1980s, including autopsies of crew members, revealed that their canned rations may have been tainted by both lead and botulism. Oral reports by local Inuit that some of the crew members resorted to cannibalism are supported by evidence of cut marks and pot polish on the skeletal remains of crew members found on King William Island during the late 20th century.

== Discovery of the wreckage ==
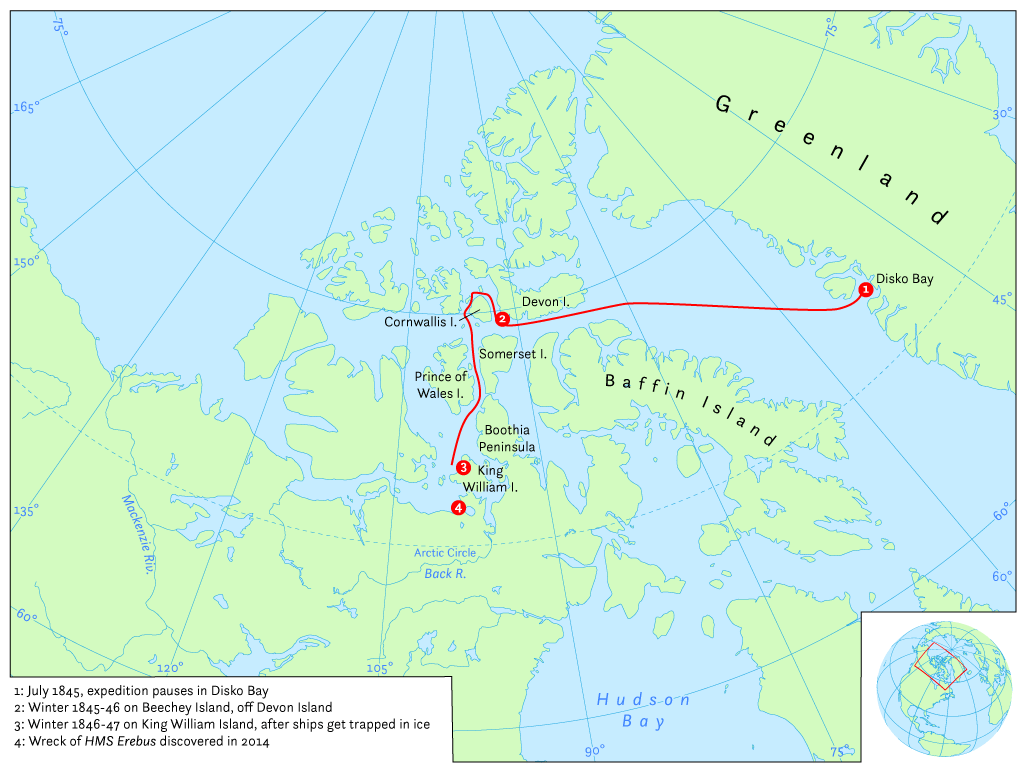
Map of the probable routes taken by HMS Erebus and HMS Terror during Franklin's lost expedition. Disko Bay is about 3,200 km (2,000 mi) from the mouth of the Mackenzie River.

HMS Terror was found off the south coast of King William Island, highlighted at centre left.

Sites of remains of Franklin's Lost Expedition

On 15 August 2008, Parks Canada, an agency of the Government of Canada, announced a CAD$75,000 six-week search, deploying the icebreaker CCGS Sir Wilfrid Laurier with the goal of finding the two ships. The search was also intended to strengthen Canada's claims of sovereignty over large portions of the Arctic. Attempts were also undertaken in 2010, 2011, and 2012, all of which failed to locate the ships' remains.

On 8 September 2014, it was announced that the wreckage of one of Franklin's ships was found on 7 September using a remotely operated underwater vehicle recently acquired by Parks Canada. On 1 October 2014, Canadian Prime Minister Stephen Harper announced that the remains were that of Erebus.

On 12 September 2016, a team from the Arctic Research Foundation announced that a wreck close to Terror's description had been located on the southern coast of King William Island in the middle of Terror Bay (68°54′N 98°56′W), at a depth of 69–79 ft (21–24 m). The remains of the ships are designated a National Historic Site of Canada with the exact location withheld to preserve the wrecks and prevent looting.

Sammy Kogvik, an Inuk hunter and member of the Canadian Rangers who joined the crew of the Arctic Research Foundation's Martin Bergmann, recalled an incident from seven years earlier in which he encountered what appeared to be a mast jutting from the ice. With this information, the ship's destination was changed from Cambridge Bay to Terror Bay, where researchers located the wreck in just 2.5 hours. According to Louie Kamookak, a resident of nearby Gjoa Haven and a historian on the Franklin expedition, Parks Canada had ignored the stories of locals that suggested that the wreck of Terror was in her namesake bay, despite many modern stories of sightings by hunters and from airplanes.

The wreck was found in excellent condition, her decks and interior spaces largely intact. A wide exhaust pipe that rose from the outer deck was pivotal in identifying the ship; it was located in the same location where the smokestack from Terror's locomotive engine had been installed. The wreck was nearly 100 km (62 mi) south of where historians thought her final resting place was, calling into question the previously accepted account of the fate of the sailors, that they died while trying to walk out of the Arctic to the nearest Hudson's Bay Company trading post.

The location of the wreckage, and evidence in the wreckage of anchor usage, indicates continued use, raising the possibility that some of the sailors had attempted to re-man the ship and sail her home (or elsewhere), possibly on orders from Crozier.

On 23 October 2017 it was announced by British Defence Minister Sir Michael Fallon that the British government would be giving Terror and Erebus to Canada, retaining only a few relics and any gold, along with the right to repatriate any human remains.

In 2018, Terror and Erebus were gifted to Canada and the Inuit, in care of the Inuit Heritage Trust, by the government of the United Kingdom. This includes all the remaining artifacts.

Although the exact location has not been released, Nancy Anilniliak, the Field Unit Superintendent of the Nunavut Field Unit, has restricted access to an approximately 10 km × 5 km (6.2 mi × 3.1 mi) rectangular area in Terror Bay. The area runs from Point E (68°54′25.45″N 98°59′42.07″W) to Point F (68°54′25.24″N 98°51′29.08″W) to Point G (68°48′46.23″N 98°51′31.25″W) to Point H (68°48′46.44″N 98°59′42.15″W).

In August 2019, taking advantage of "exceptionally co-operative" weather conditions, Parks Canada conducted 48 dives over the course of seven days to Terror, 3D-mapping the wreck and searching the interior with ROVs. The team was able to map out ninety per cent of Terror's lower deck, but were unable to access Crozier's cabin due to the buildup of sediment. Despite this, Crozier's cabin was considered the best preserved space in the lower deck, and Parks Canada has expressed the hope that written materials may be found there. The planned exploration of the wreck sites in 2020 was cancelled due to the COVID-19 pandemic. Parks Canada's Underwater Archaeology Team returned to the wrecks in May 2022, after a two-year postponement.

== Legacy ==
=== In art, entertainment, and media ===
HMS Terror is featured, often alongside HMS Erebus, in fictional works that involve or allude to the Franklin expedition, such as:

- "Northwest Passage" is a 1981 song by Canadian musician Stan Rogers about the Franklin expedition and its fate.
- Terror and Erebus (1965) is a verse play for CBC Radio by Canadian poet Gwendolyn MacEwen, subsequently published in her collection Afterworlds (1987).
- Mordecai Richler's novel Solomon Gursky Was Here (1989), in which Ephraim Gursky survives the expedition and lives to pass on his Judaism and Yiddish to some of the local Inuit.
- Dan Simmons' novel The Terror (2007), a fictionalized account of Captain Sir John Franklin's lost expedition of HMS Erebus and HMS Terror to the Arctic, in 1845–1848, to force the Northwest Passage. In the novel, while Franklin and his crew are plagued by starvation and illness, and forced to contend with mutiny and cannibalism, they are stalked across the bleak Arctic landscape by a monster. The novel has been adapted as an eponymous 2018 television series by cable TV channel AMC.
- "The Erebus and the Terror", an instrumental piece composed by Mícheál Ó Domhnaill, is the third track on the 1987 album Something of Time by Nightnoise.
- Erebus: The Story of a Ship (2018, published by Hutchinson, a division of Random House), by Michael Palin, is a historical account of the ships Erebus and Terror. The book was serialized on BBC Radio 4 in 2018.
- The Ministry of Time, a novel by Kaliane Bradley published in 2024, includes an account of the doomed expedition.

=== In namesakes ===
- Mount Terror on Ross Island, near Antarctica, was named after the ship by Captain Ross, who also named a nearby and slightly taller peak to the west, Mount Erebus.
- Erebus and Terror Gulf, in Antarctica. Named after the vessels used by Royal Navy Captain Sir James Clark Ross in exploring the area in 1842–43.
- Terror Bay on King William Island was named in 1910, long before the discovery of the wreck there.
- Terror Rupes, an escarpment on the planet Mercury.
- Terror Street in the suburb of Keilor Park in Melbourne, Australia.

== Books ==
- Palin, Michael (2018). Erebus: The Story of a Ship. London: Hutchinson. ISBN 978-1-847-94812-0. OCLC 1099677972.

== See also ==
- European and American voyages of scientific exploration
- List of bomb vessels of the Royal Navy
