= America and West Indies Station =

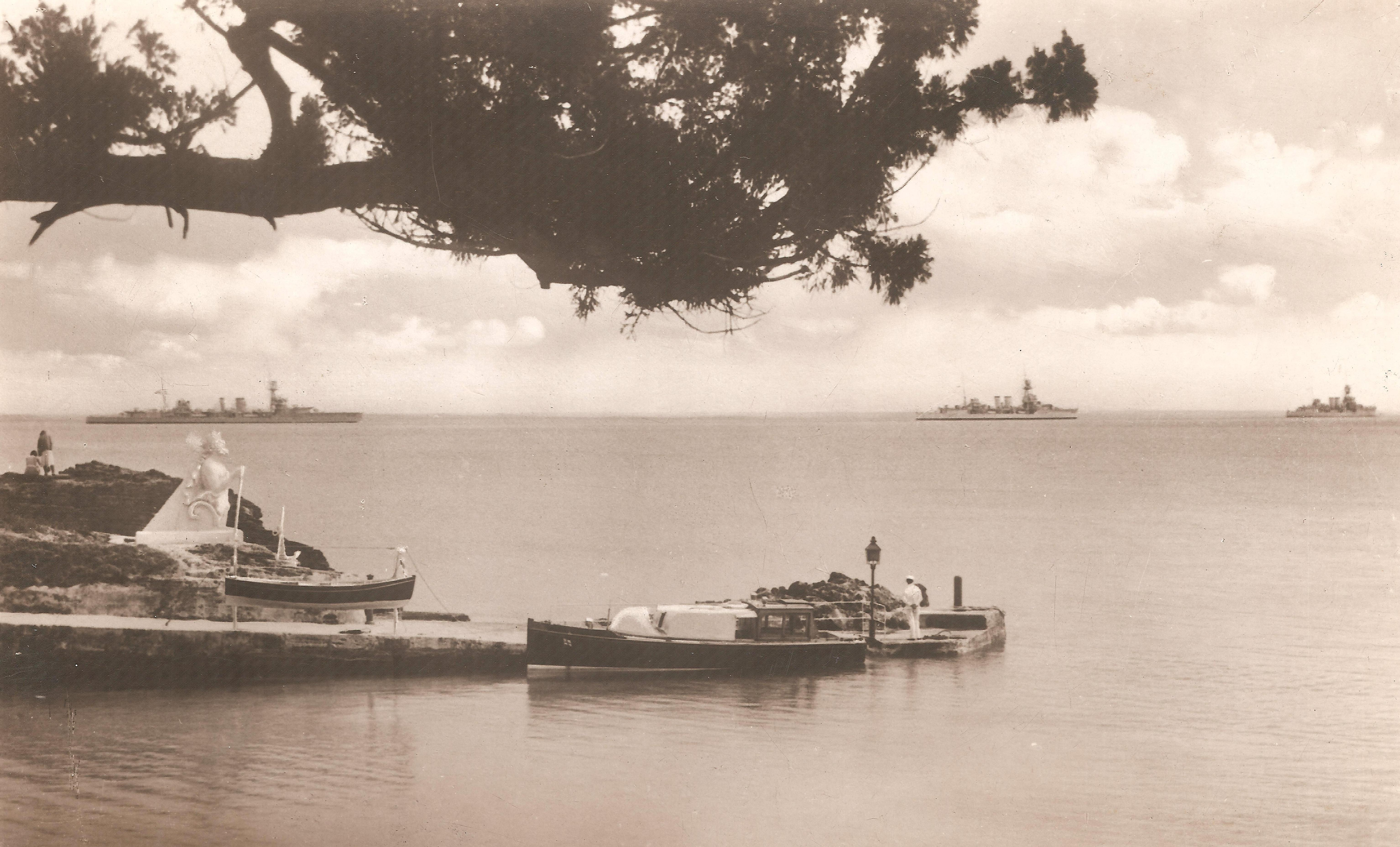
- Cruisers of the America and West Indies Station off Bermuda, 1931
- Active: North American Station (1745–1818); North America and West Indies Station (1818–1926); America and West Indies Station (1926–1956); West Indies (1956–1976)
- Disbanded: 1 April 1976
- Country: United Kingdom
- Branch: Royal Navy
- Type: Naval station
- Admiralty House: Bermuda (winter residence, 1795-1956); Halifax (summer residence, 1819-1905)
- Notable ships: Fame, Invincible, Leopard, Resolute
- Engagements: See list: Battle of Craney Island; Battle of the Chesapeake; Battle of Cape Henry; Siege of Yorktown; Battle of St. Kitts (American Revolutionary War); USS Constitution vs HMS Guerriere; Capture of HMS Frolic; Capture of USS Chesapeake, Capture of HMS Boxer; Burning of Washington (Chesapeake Campaign); Battle of Baltimore (Chesapeake Campaign) (War of 1812); Pursuit of SM U-53 (1916); Battle of the Atlantic

Commanders
- Commander-in-Chief: Vice-Admiral Sir John Eaton (last)

The America and West Indies Station is a former Royal Navy station responsible for the western Atlantic, West Indies, and eastern Pacific, active between 1926 and 1956. It was the successor of the North American Station, which absorbed the separate Newfoundland Station in 1825 (becoming the North America and Newfoundland Station), and the Jamaica Station in 1830, to form the North America and West Indies Station. It was briefly abolished in 1907 before being restored in 1915. It was renamed the America and West Indies Station in 1926, absorbing what had been the South East Coast of America Station and the Pacific Station.

== History ==
In January 1748 Charles Watson was appointed to command HMS Lion. In March that year he was sent out aboard Lion as commander-in-chief on the Newfoundland and North American station, with a commodore's broad pennant.

Royal Navy ships and vessels in the area were under the command of Commodore Samuel Hood in 1767. The headquarters was located in Halifax from 1758 to 1794, and thereafter in Halifax and Bermuda. Land and buildings for a permanent Naval Yard were purchased by the Royal Navy in 1758 and the Yard was officially commissioned in 1759. Halifax served as the main base for the Royal Navy in North America during the Seven Years' War, the American Revolution, and the French Revolutionary Wars.

Following American independence in 1783, Bermuda was the only British territory left between Nova Scotia and the West Indies. In 1794 the local area commander, Vice Admiral Sir George Murray, sent HMS Cleopatra there to reconnoite the harbour. The establishment of a base there was delayed for a dozen years, however, due to the need to survey the encircling barrier reef to locate channels suitable for large warships. Once this had been completed, a base was established at St. George's in 1794, with the fleet anchoring at Murray's Anchorage in the northern lagoon. The Admiralty also began purchasing land at Bermuda's West End, including Ireland Island, Spanish Point, and smaller islands in the Great Sound with the intent of building the Royal Naval Dockyard, Bermuda, and a permanent naval base there, with its anchorage on Grassy Bay. The construction of this base was to drag on through much of the Nineteenth Century.

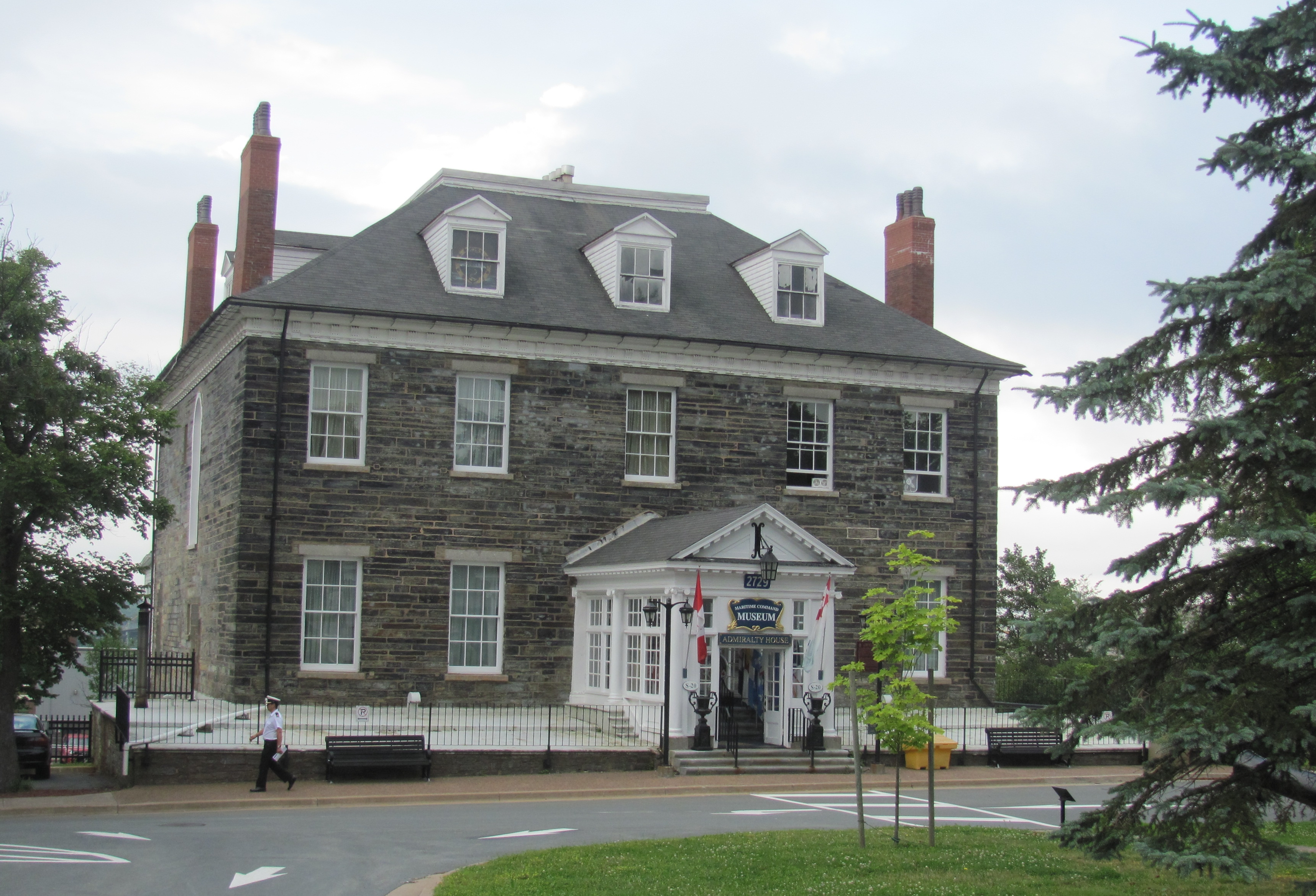
Admiralty House, Halifax, summer headquarters of the Admiral commanding.

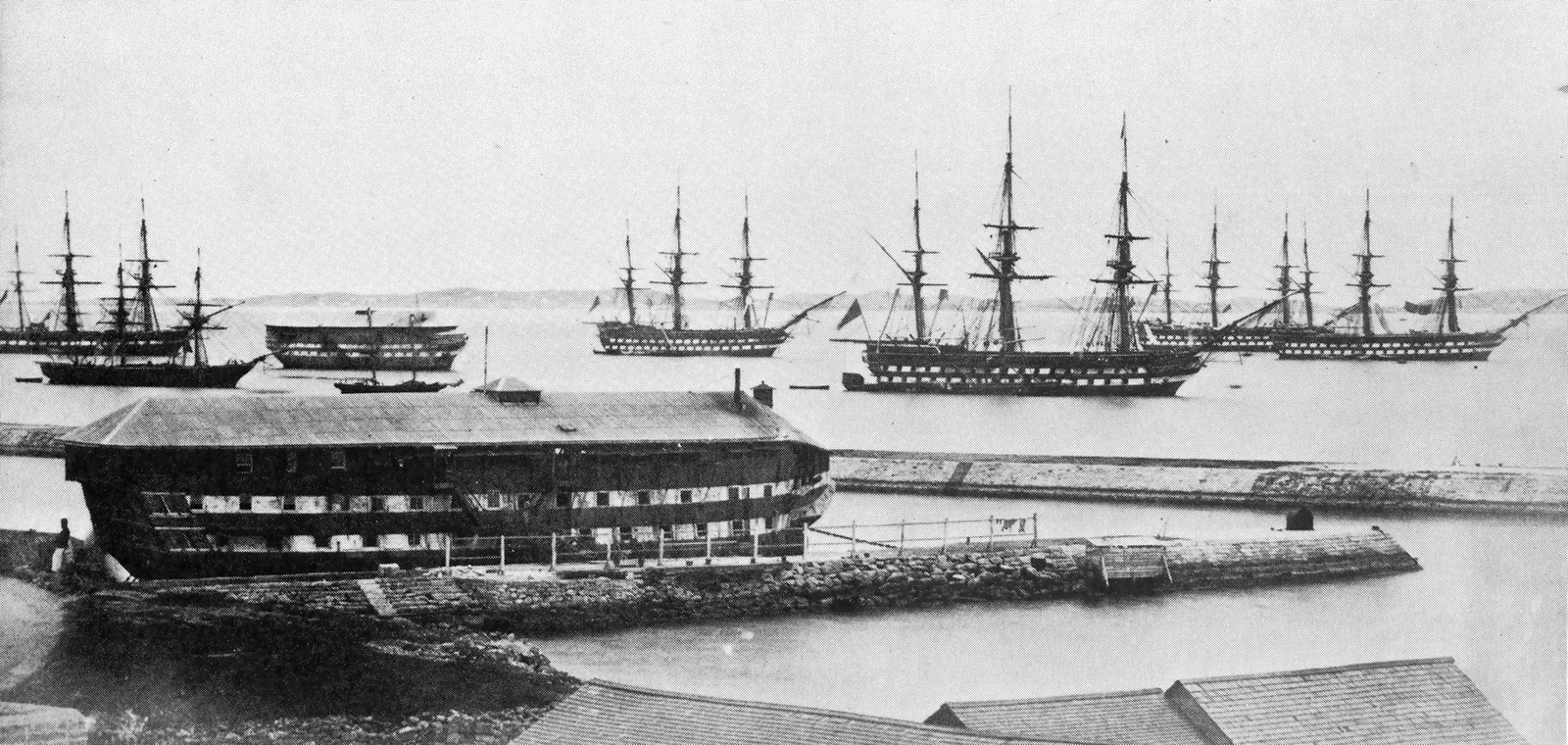
The Grassy Bay anchorage seen from HMD Bermuda in 1865

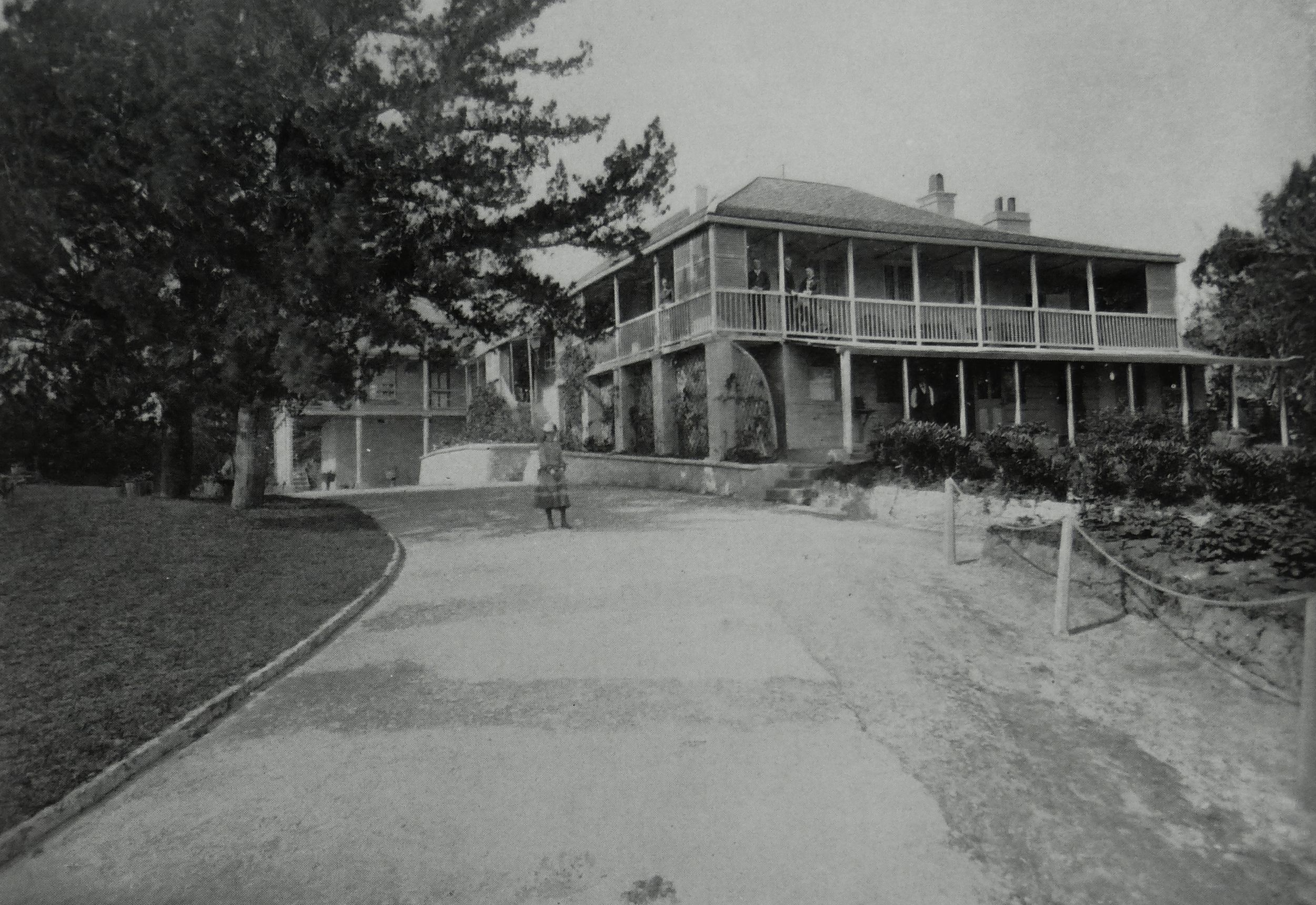
Admiralty House Bermuda, Clarence Hill (1816–1956), Pembroke Parish, Bermuda

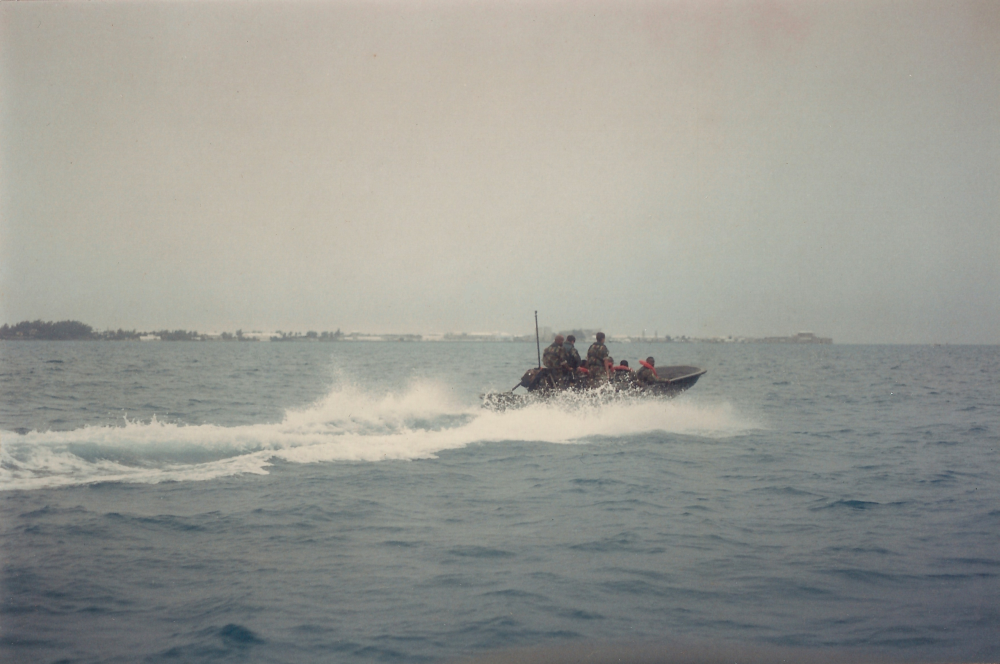
Grassy Bay, the anchorage for the fleet in Bermuda between 1816 and 1956, with the Royal Naval Dockyard in the background

Admiral Sir John Borlase Warren was appointed Commander-in-Chief in 1812, and he and his staff seem to have spent most of their time at Bermuda during the War of 1812 (he was replaced by Vice Admiral Sir Alexander Inglis Cochrane on 1 April 1814), from where the blockade of much of the Atlantic Seaboard of the United States and raids such as the Battle of Craney Island were orchestrated. 2,500 soldiers under Major-General Robert Ross aboard HMS Royal Oak, three frigates, three sloops and ten other vessels, was sent to Bermuda in 1814, following British victory in the Peninsular War. They helped carry out the Chesapeake campaign punitive expedition which included the Raid on Alexandria, the Battle of Bladensburg, and the Burning of Washington, which was launched in August that year.

In 1813, the area of command had become the North America Station again, with the West Indies falling under the Jamaica Station, and in 1816 it was renamed the North America and Lakes of Canada Station. The headquarters was initially in Bermuda during the winter and Halifax during the summer, but Admiralty House, Bermuda, became the year-round headquarters of the station in 1821, when it became the North America and Newfoundland Station (with the absorption of the Newfoundland Station). In 1818 Halifax became the summer base for the squadron which shifted to the Royal Naval Dockyard, Bermuda, for the remainder of the year. In 1819, Bermuda, which was better positioned to counter threats from the United States, became the main base of the station year-round. Halifax continued to be used as the summer base for the station until 1907.

Sir Henry Hardinge said, in the House of Commons, on 22 March 1839:

All who were conversant with the interests of our West Indian and North American possessions must know that Bermuda was one of our most important posts—a station where the navy could be refitted with the greatest ease, where during the last war we had about 2,000,000l. value in stores, where our ships (such was the safety of the anchorage) could at all times take refuge. This island had been fortified at very great expense; for some years 5,000 convicts had been engaged on the works, and it was most important in every point of view that this island should be maintained in a state of perfect security. For a long time even after the determination of the sympathisers in the United States to attack us had been known, the force at Bermuda was never greater than a small battalion of 480 or 500 men, perfectly inadequate to do the duties of the station. Considering that this post was one of great consequence, that immense sums had been expended upon it, and that the efficiency of the navy in those seas was chiefly to be secured by means of it, it was indispensable, that it should be in safe keeping.

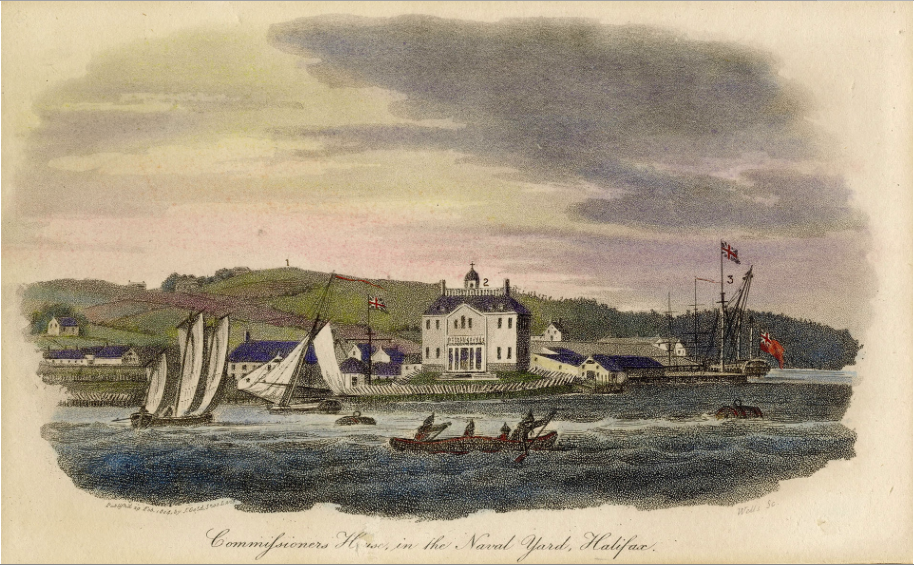
Commissioners House, in the Naval Yard, Halifax, 1804

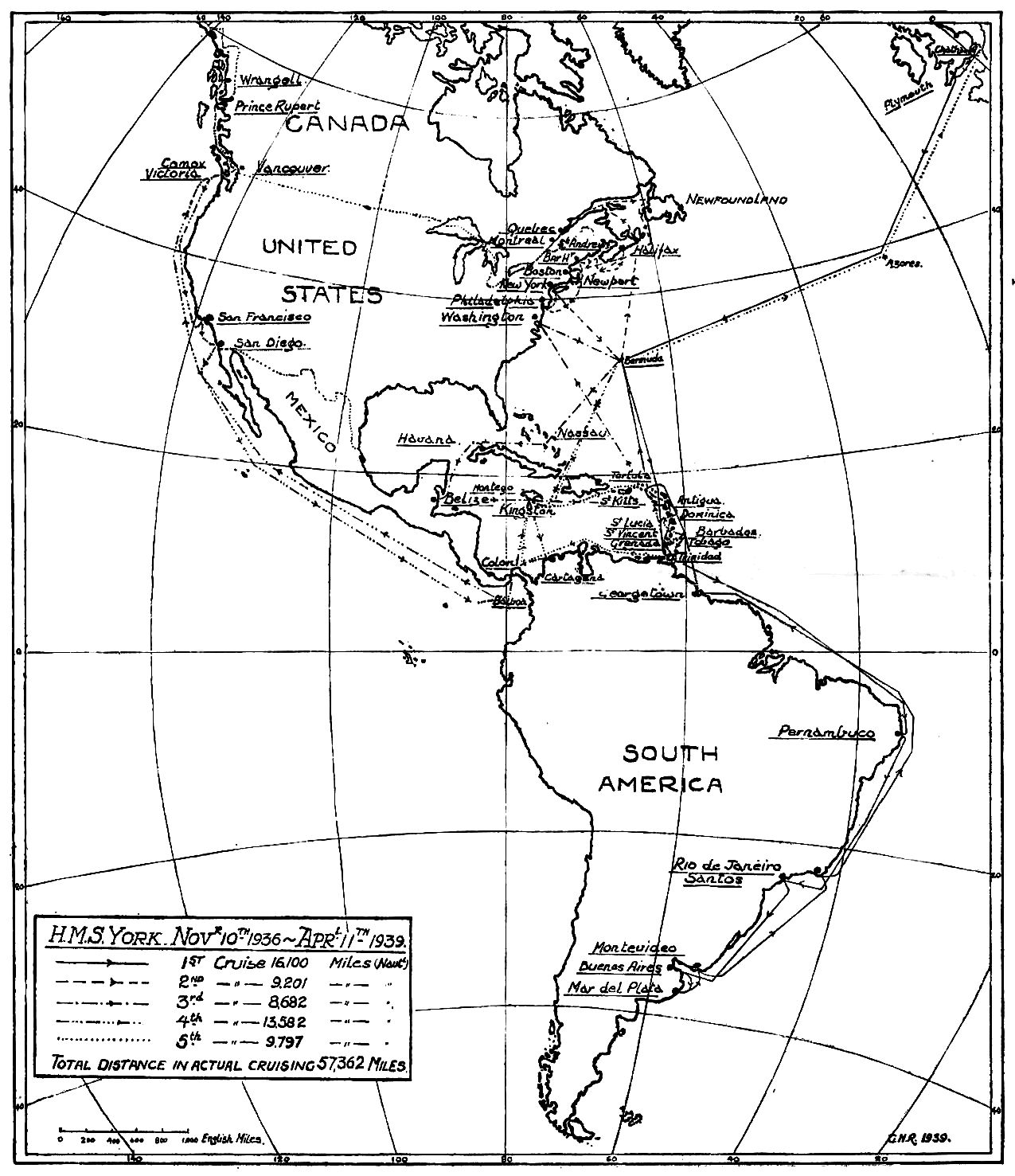
Map of the cruises of the Bermuda-based HMS York on the America & West Indies Station, 1936-1939

In 1830 the station absorbed the Jamaica Station and was redesignated as the North America and West Indies Station, and remained so until 1907, when the North America and West Indies Station was abolished and replaced by the 4th Cruiser Squadron, based in the UK (at least in peacetime). Bermuda was redesignated from a base to a coaling station, although the dockyard remained in operation. The Commander-in-Chief, North America and West Indies Station, remained in Bermuda. The Royal Navy withdrew from Halifax in 1905, and the Halifax Naval Yard was handed over to the Royal Canadian Navy in 1910.

An official letter sent by the Commander-in-Chief during the Venezuelan crisis of 1902–1903 listed the following ships at the station on 1 January 1903: cruisers HMS Ariadne, HMS Charybdis, HMS Pallas, HMS Indefatigable, HMS Retribution, and HMS Tribune; sloops HMS Fantome and HMS Alert; destroyers HMS Quail and HMS Rocket; and the tender HMS Columbine.

The North America and West Indies Station was restored in 1915, and incorporated the 8th Cruiser Squadron from 1924 to 1925. In 1919, relying on the Panama Canal, it absorbed the former Pacific Station's area. In 1920 HMS Chatham based in Bermuda, passed through the Panama Canal, and in November left Salina Crus en route from San Diego. This was the first occasion on which a ship from the station had passed through the Canal.

The North America and West Indies Squadron is to have a wide area to patrol, comprising the North Atlantic, the West Indies and the North Pacific-from the Galapagos Islands to the Bering Straits. While any of the vessels of this squadron are in the Pacific their headquarters will be at Esquimalt. The squadron is to be composed of four of the most powerful light cruisers afloat, and will be in command of Vice-Admiral Sir Trevelyn Napier, who will have his headquarters at Bermuda. There will also be smaller craft attached to the squadron for police duties.

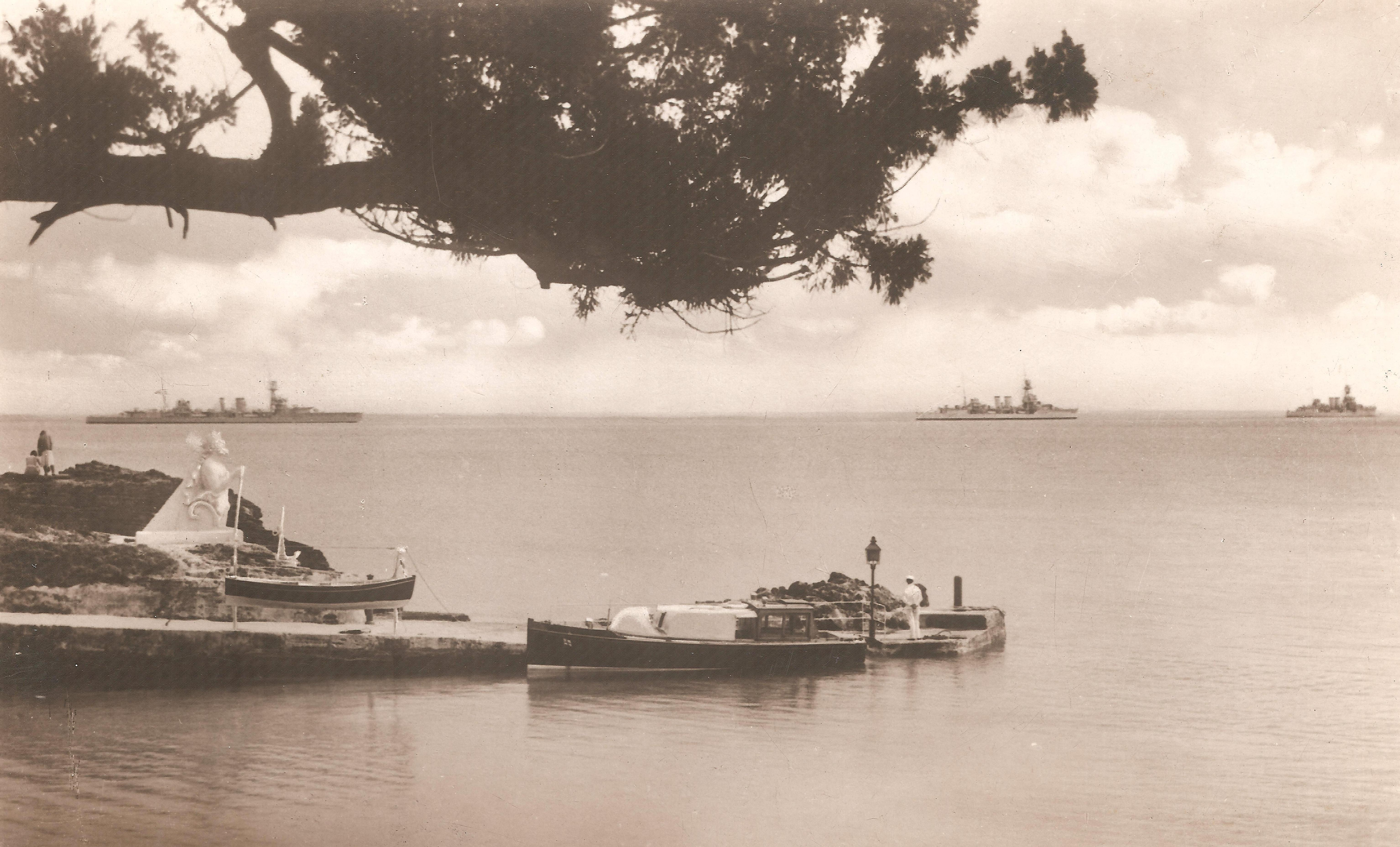
America and West Indies Station 1st Division (HMS Dragon, HMS Danae and HMS Despatch) off Admiralty House in 1931, just prior to departing Bermuda to exercise.

In 1928, South American waters were added to the Commander-in-Chief's area and the command was renamed America and West Indies. In May 1928, Dauntless was recommissioned and transferred to the Station from the Mediterranean to augment the vessels of the 8th Light Cruiser Station. South American waters had previously been patrolled by the "South American Squadron", but this had been withdrawn due to financial constraints in 1921, since when the British flag has been shown there only by special visits (such as during the world cruise of the First Cruiser Squadron in 1924 or by HMS Repulse during the March to October, 1925, tour of Africa and South America by the Prince of Wales'), or by detaching a ship from the North America and West Indies Station. With the start of the Second World War in 1939, the South American Division (HMS Exeter and HMS Ajax) were transferred from the America and West Indies Station to the Commander-in-Chief, South Atlantic. In 1942 the C-in-C America and West Indies was retitled as Senior British Naval Officer, Western Atlantic.

In 1945 the America and West Indies title was restored. In June 1948, HMS Sheffield, the flagship, visited Bermuda.

In 1951, the Royal Naval Dockyard, Bermuda, was reduced to a base without drydock facilities, with the Admiralty Floating Dock No. 5 towed to Britain by HM Tugs Warden and Reward (the smaller AFD 48 remained). The position of Senior Naval Officer West Indies (SNOWI) was established as a Sub-Area Commander under the Commander-in-Chief of the America and West Indies station. The occupant of this position was a commodore, and was provided with a shore office on Ireland Island (which was beside the Victualling Yard until 1962), but was required to spend much of his time at sea in the West Indies. A flagship (between 1951 and April, 1956, this was successively HMS Sheffield, HMS Superb, HMS Sheffield, HMS Kenya) and other vessels of the America and West Indies Squadron continued to be based at the South Yard of the former Royal Naval Dockyard, where the Royal Navy maintained a Berthing Area under the command of a Resident Naval Officer (RNO), but were detached from the Home Fleet, and their refits and repairs were thenceforth to be carried out in Britain. The RNO had his own office in one of the houses of Dockyard Terrace. Admiralty land not required for the continued naval operations was sold to the colonial government. There was also an RNO in Nassau.

In 1952, the Commander-in-Chief, Vice Admiral Sir William Andrewes, became the initial Deputy Supreme Allied Commander Atlantic.

Vice-Admiral John Eaton, the last Commander-in-Chief, flew his flag from HMS Kenya; on hauling down his flag as C-in-C A&WI, he moved to Norfolk and spent an additional year there solely as Deputy Supreme Allied Commander Atlantic.

== Disestablishment and successor, SNOWI ==
On 29 October 1956, the post of Commander-in-Chief, America and West Indies Station, was abolished, leaving the Senior Naval Officer, West Indies as his replacement. SNOWI reported directly to the Commander-in-Chief, Home Fleet in the United Kingdom. SNOWI also served as Island Commander Bermuda (ISCOMBERMUDA) in the NATO chain of command, reporting to Commander-in-Chief, Western Atlantic Area, as part of Allied Command Atlantic. The ships of the command were reduced to two Station Frigates.

All remaining Admiralty land in Bermuda, including Admiralty House at Clarence Hill and Ireland Island, along with the War Department lands, were sold to the colonial government in the 1960s.

Newly promoted Commodore Edward Ashmore was the first to hold the combined command of Senior Naval Officer West Indies and Commander British Forces Caribbean Area, plus the existing NATO Island Commander, Bermuda. As Commander British Forces Caribbean Area the incumbent Commodore was directly responsible to the Chief of Defence Staff. Starting in July 1963, Ashmore had under his command three frigates, at various times HMS Londonderry (F108), HMS Caprice, HMS Ursa (R22), and later HMS Tartar (F133), plus a resident battalion of the Army in British Guiana and a reinforced company group in British Honduras.

By the time Ashmore arrived, the dockyard in Bermuda was "in a state of chaos," a "shocking mess," and required much attention and rebuilding. The part of the dockyard still required for naval operations remained under Admiralty control under a ninety-nine year lease as the South Yard Berthing Area, which was commissioned on 1 June 1965 as HMS Malabar, under the command of the RNO. The headquarters of SNOWI and the RNO was set up in Moresby House (originally built in the 1899s as the residence of the civilian Officer in Charge, Works). In December, 1967, the position of RNO Bermuda was abolished, with its duties passing to SNOWI's secretary and SNOWI taking over command of HMS Malabar. As SNOWI was frequently in the West Indies, he was unable to effectively command HMS Malabar and a Lieutenant-Commander was consequently appointed to the roles of Commanding Officer of HMS Malabar and RNO in 1971.

The former Royal Naval wireless station land at Daniels Head was leased to the Royal Canadian Navy on 1 January 1963, for the purpose of a new radio station. It became CFS Daniel's Head when the Royal Canadian Navy became part of the Canadian Forces in 1969.

After the assassination of the Governor of Bermuda, Sir Richard Sharples, in February 1973, HMS Sirius provided enhanced security for Commodore Cameron Rusby, the then-SNOWI. A detachment of Royal Marines (subsequently replaced by soldiers from the Parachute Regiment) was posted to the Dockyard to guard SNOWI.

While Bermuda had been the ideal base of operations for the North America and West Indies Station, at a thousand miles north of the Virgin Islands, it was far too distant to serve as an effective headquarters for only the West Indies. This meant that both SNOWI and the Station Frigates spent little time in or near Bermuda. On 1 April 1976, the post of SNOWI was abolished, and the Station Frigates were withdrawn. The RNO and his staff remained, and a frigate was appointed West Indies Guardship, but seldom visited Bermuda. HMS Malabar ceased to be a base and was rated only as a supply station.

By 1995, when Malabar was handed over to the Government of Bermuda, the Royal Naval presence in the North-Western Atlantic and Caribbean had been reduced to only the West Indies Guard Ship, a role which was rotated among the fleet's escorts, which took turns operating extended patrols of the West Indies.

== Sub commands ==
- Jamaica Division consisting of naval vessels
- Jamaica Dockyard shore establishment.

== Commanders in Chief ==
Commanders of the station have included:
No = died in post

=== Commander-in-Chief, North American Station ===
- Commodore Charles Watson (1748–49)
- Commodore Augustus Keppel (1754–55)
- Vice-Admiral Edward Boscawen (1755–56)
- Commodore Lord Colville (November 1759 – October 1762)
- Commodore Richard Spry (October 1762 – October 1763)
- Rear Admiral Lord Colville (October 1763 – September 1766)
- Captain Joseph Deane (September 1766 – November 1766)
- Captain Archibald Kennedy (November 1766 – July 1767)
- Commodore Samuel Hood (July 1767 – October 1770)
- Commodore James Gambier (October 1770 – August 1771)
- Rear Admiral John Montagu (August 1771 – June 1774)
- Vice Admiral Samuel Graves (June 1774 – January 1776)
- Vice Admiral Richard Howe (February 1776 – September 1778)
- Vice Admiral James Gambier (1778–79)
- Vice Admiral John Byron (1779)
- Vice Admiral Mariot Arbuthnot (1779–81)
- Vice Admiral Sir Thomas Graves (1781)
- Rear Admiral Robert Digby (1781–83)
- Rear Admiral Sir Charles Douglas (1783–85)
- Vice Admiral Sir Herbert Sawyer (1785–89)
- Vice Admiral Sir Richard Hughes (1789–92)
- Captain Sir Rupert George (1792–1794)
- Vice Admiral George Murray (1794–96)
- Vice Admiral George Vandeput (1797–1800) No
- Vice Admiral Sir William Parker (1800–02)
- Vice Admiral Sir Andrew Mitchell (1802–06) No
- Vice Admiral Sir George Cranfield Berkeley (1806–07)
- Vice Admiral Sir John Warren (1807–10)
- Vice Admiral Sir Herbert Sawyer (1810–13)
- Admiral Sir John Warren (1813–14)
- Vice Admiral Sir Alexander Cochrane (1814–15)
- Vice Admiral Sir David Milne (1816)
- Vice Admiral Sir Edward Colpoys (1816–21)

=== Commander-in-Chief, North America and West Indies Station ===
- Vice Admiral Sir William Fahie (1821–24)
- Vice Admiral Sir Willoughby Lake (1824–27)
- Vice Admiral Sir Charles Ogle (1827–30)
- Vice Admiral Sir Edward Colpoys (1830–32)
- Vice Admiral Sir George Cockburn (1832–36)
- Vice Admiral Sir Peter Halkett (1836–37)
- Vice Admiral Sir Charles Paget (1837–39) No
- Commodore Peter John Douglas (1839)
- Vice Admiral Sir Thomas Harvey (1839–41) No
- Commodore Peter John Douglas (1841)
- Vice Admiral Sir Charles Adam (1841–44)
- Vice Admiral Sir Francis Austen (1844–48)
- Vice Admiral Sir Thomas Cochrane (1848–51)
- Vice Admiral Sir George Seymour (1851–53)
- Vice Admiral Sir Arthur Fanshawe (1853–56)
- Vice Admiral Sir Houston Stewart (1856–60)
- Vice Admiral Sir Alexander Milne (1860–64)
- Vice Admiral Sir James Hope (1864–67)
- Vice Admiral Sir Rodney Mundy (1867–69)
- Vice Admiral Sir George Wellesley (1869–70)
- Vice Admiral Sir Edward Fanshawe (1870–73)
- Vice Admiral Sir George Wellesley (1873–75)
- Vice Admiral Sir Astley Key (1875–78)
- Vice Admiral Sir Edward Inglefield (1878–79)
- Vice Admiral Sir Francis McClintock (1879–82)
- Vice Admiral Sir John Commerell (1882–85)
- Vice Admiral The Earl of Clanwilliam (1885–86)
- Vice Admiral Sir Algernon Lyons (1886–88)
- Vice Admiral Sir George Watson (1888–91)
- Vice Admiral Sir John Hopkins (1891–95)
- Vice Admiral Sir James Erskine (1895–97)
- Vice Admiral Sir Jackie Fisher (1897–99)
- Vice Admiral Sir Frederick Bedford (1899–15 July 1902)
- Vice Admiral Sir Archibald Douglas (15 July 1902 – 1904)
- Vice Admiral Sir Day Bosanquet (1904–07)

Vacant (1907–13)

- Vice Admiral Sir Christopher Cradock (1913–14) No
- Rear Admiral Robert Hornby (1914–15)
- Vice Admiral Sir George Patey (1915–16)
- Vice Admiral Sir Montague Browning (1916–18)
- Vice Admiral Sir William Grant (1918–19)
- Vice Admiral Sir Morgan Singer (1919)
- Vice Admiral Sir Trevylyan Napier (1919–20) No
- Vice Admiral Sir William Pakenham (1920–23)
- Vice Admiral Sir Michael Culme-Seymour (1923–24)
- Vice Admiral Sir James Fergusson (1924–26)

=== Commander-in-Chief, America and West Indies Station ===
- Vice Admiral Sir Walter Cowan (1926–28)
- Vice Admiral Sir Cyril Fuller (1928–30)
- Vice Admiral Sir Vernon Haggard (1930–32)
- Vice Admiral Sir Reginald Plunkett (1932–34)
- Vice Admiral Sir Matthew Best (1934–37)
- Vice Admiral Sir Sidney Meyrick (1937–40)
- Vice Admiral Sir Charles Kennedy-Purvis (1940–41)

=== Senior British Naval Officer, Western Atlantic ===
- Vice Admiral Sir Charles Kennedy-Purvis (1942)
- Vice Admiral Sir Alban Curteis (1942–44)
- Vice Admiral Sir Irvine Glennie (1944–45)

=== Commander-in-Chief, America and West Indies Station ===
After the end of the Second World War the former name of the station was restored.|

- Vice Admiral Sir William Tennant (1946–49)
- Vice Admiral Sir Richard Symonds-Tayler (1949–51)
- Vice Admiral Sir William Andrewes (1951–53)
- Vice Admiral Sir John Stevens (1953–55)
- Vice Admiral Sir John Eaton (1955–56)

== See also ==
- List of fleets and major commands of the Royal Navy
- List of Royal Navy ships in North America
- Military history of Nova Scotia
- Military history of Canada
- Commander-in-Chief, North America
- Newfoundland Station
- Jamaica Station (Royal Navy)
- South East Coast of America Station
