= Leopold McClintock =

Irish Royal Navy Admiral and explorer (1819–1907)

Admiral Sir Leopold McClintock KCB FRS
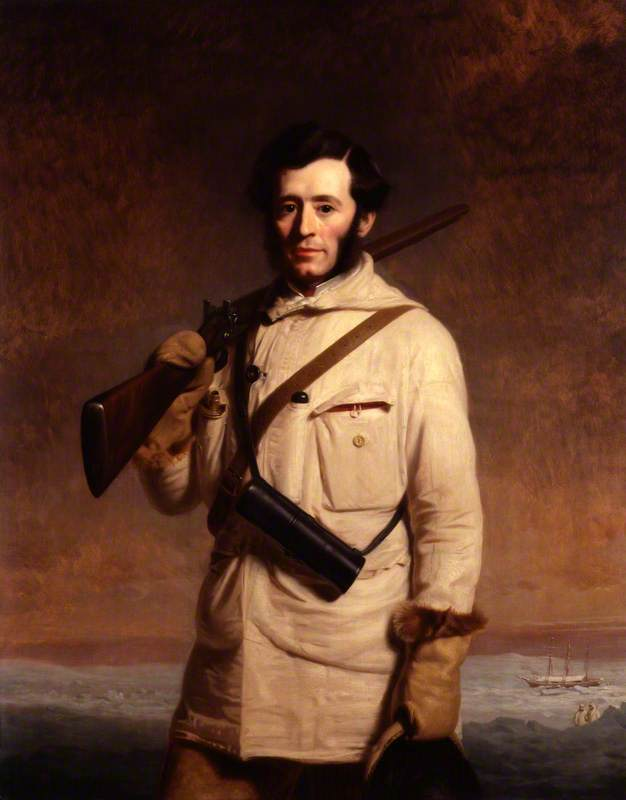
- Portrait of Leopold McClintock by Stephen Pearce, 1859

North America and West Indies Station
- Commander-in-Chief; 27 November 1879 – 7 November 1882
- Preceded by: Sir Edward Inglefield
- Succeeded by: Sir John Commerell

Jamaica Division
- Commodore; 6 September 1865 – 21 February 1868
- Preceded by: Sir Algernon de Horsey
- Succeeded by: Sir Augustus Phillimore

Personal details
- Born: Francis Leopold McClintock; 8 July 1819 Dundalk, County Louth, Ireland
- Died: 17 November 1907 (aged 88) Kensington, London, England
- Resting place: Hanwell Cemetery
- Spouse: Annette Dunlop (m. 1870)
- Children: John William McClintock
- Awards: Royal Geographical Society's Patron's Medal (1860); Knight Commander of the Order of the Bath (1891)

Military service
- Allegiance: United Kingdom
- Branch: Royal Navy
- Service years: 1835–1884
- Rank: Admiral
- Expeditions: McClintock Arctic expedition

Admiral Sir Francis Leopold McClintock KCB FRS (8 July 1819 – 17 November 1907) was an Irish explorer in the British Royal Navy, known for his discoveries in the Arctic Archipelago. He confirmed explorer John Rae's controversial report gathered from Inuit sources on the fate of Franklin's lost expedition, the ill-fated Royal Navy undertaking commanded by Sir John Franklin in 1845 attempting to be the first to traverse the Northwest Passage.

McClintock's report was received more favourably than that of Rae, who was shunned and denied recognition for having discovered the lost expedition's fate. Rae's report ultimately guided McClintock to the correct area to conduct a search. McClintock also stirred controversy with his claim that Franklin, before his death, had essentially discovered the Northwest Passage, while in reality he had not. Rae, with his discovery of Rae Strait, had discovered the real ice-free passage through North America's Arctic archipelago.

== Early life ==
McClintock was born on 8 July 1819, second of 12 children of Henry McClintock, formerly of the 3rd Dragoon Guards and a collector of customs at Dundalk in County Louth, Ireland, and his wife Elizabeth Melesina née Fleury. He was the second oldest son, although the eldest died somewhere in the Caribbean, aged over 40.

The family was well connected; McClintock's uncle, John McClintock, was a Member of Parliament for County Louth and owned Drumcar House.

== Arctic exploration ==
In July 1831, aged just 12 years old, he joined HMS Samarang at Portsmouth, as a Gentleman Volunteer. The Captain was Charles Paget (who would later marry one of his sisters, Emily Caroline) and the Lieutenant was a relation, William McClintock-Bunbury, whose son Thomas later became 2nd Lord Rathdonnell . In 1843 he passed his examination for lieutenancy and joined the steamship HMS Gorgon, which was driven ashore at Montevideo and salvaged, a feat of seamanship on the part of her captain and officers that attracted much attention. Hitherto, until 1847, McClintock's service was almost wholly on the American coasts.

Flag flown by McClintock on his sledge Perseverance during Erasmus Ommanney's 1850–1851 search for Franklin's expedition

McClintock joined a series of searches for Sir John Franklin between 1848 and 1859. He mastered travel through the manhauling of sledges, which remained the standard practice when it came to overland travel in icy territory in the Royal Navy, until the death of Robert Falcon Scott in his bid to reach the South Pole in 1912.

Flag flown by McClintock on his sledge Star of the North during Henry Kellett's 1852–1854 search for Franklin's expedition

In 1848, McClintock accompanied James Clark Ross on his survey of Somerset Island. As part of Captain Henry Kellett's expedition from 1852 to 1854, McClintock travelled 1,400 miles (2,300 km) by sled and discovered 800 miles (1,300 km) of previously unknown coastline.

=== Fate of Franklin's expedition ===
Flag flown by McClintock on his sledge Lady Franklin during his own 1857–1859 search for Franklin's expedition

In 1854, explorer John Rae travelled west from Repulse Bay, on the northern shores of Hudson Bay, and learned from the Inuit that a ship had been abandoned somewhere to the west. Previous expeditions had not searched the area because they thought it was ice-blocked.

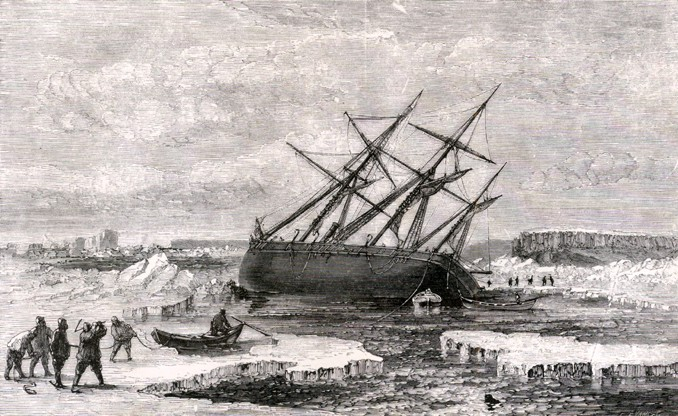
Fox on a rock near Buchan Island

In April 1857, at Lady Jane Franklin's request, McClintock agreed to take command of the Fox and led a 25-man crew in a new search for Franklin's lost expedition in the area west of Repulse Bay. At Disko Bay on the west coast of Greenland, he hired 30 sled dogs and an Inuk driver. It was a bad year for ice, and from September the Fox was beset in the ice for eight months. The following year was another disappointment, and he did not reach Beechey Island until August 1858. He entered Peel Sound, found it blocked by ice, backed up, and entered Prince Regent Inlet in the hope of passing Bellot Strait. He was glad to extricate himself from this narrow passage and found winter quarters near its entrance.

In February 1859, when sledging became practical, he went south to the North Magnetic Pole – which had been found by James Clark Ross in 1831. Here he met some Inuit who told him that a ship had been crushed by ice off King William Island, the crew had landed safely and that some white people had starved to death on an island. In April, he went south again and on the east coast of King William Island met other Inuit who sold him artefacts from Franklin's expedition. William Hobson, who had separated from him, found the only written record left by Franklin's expedition buried under a cairn on the northwest corner of the island. The document recorded Sir John Franklin's death on 11 June 1847, and also intimated Francis Crozier and James Fitzjames' plan to lead the survivors south toward the North American mainland. They also found a skeleton with European clothes and a ship's boat on runners containing two corpses. They got as far south as Montreal Island and the mouth of the Back's Great Fish River.

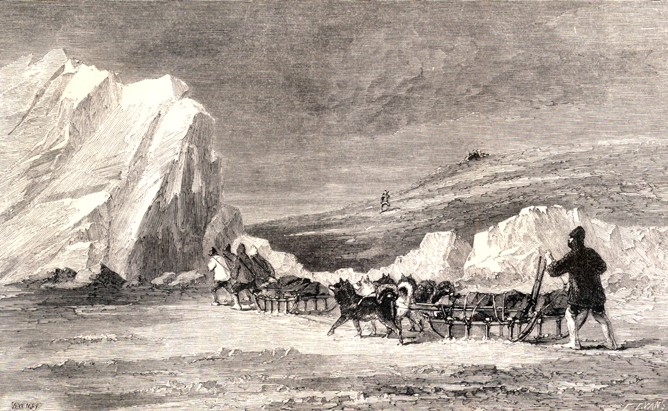
Discovery of the remains of the cairn

McClintock returned to England in September 1859, and was hailed as the discoverer of the lost expedition's fate. In addition to being knighted, the officers and men of the Fox shared a £5,000 parliamentary reward. The tale was published in The Voyage of the 'Fox' in the Arctic seas: a narrative of the discovery of the fate of Sir John Franklin and his companions. McClintock's findings were of special importance for the subsequent romantification of John Franklin's figure in British culture, since the establishment of his date of death as having occurred before the ships' abandonment and the crew's failed trek south, firmly acquitted the veteran sailor from any suspicion of cannibalism. This had been a concern since 1854, when Rae had arrived back to London with shocking reports from Inuit sources that had greatly scandalised Victorian society, particularly Lady Franklin.

McClintock's writings, on the other hand, were obsequious towards Franklin, even going so far as to celebrate his "virtual completion" of the Northwest Passage, even though Erebus and Terror never sailed through Rae Strait, the only truly navigable passageway – for a 19th-century ship – that would have allowed sailing along North America's northern Arctic coastline all the way into the Pacific.

=== Bulldog sounding expedition ===
In 1860, McClintock took command of the paddle steamer Bulldog as part of an expedition to determine the feasibility of carrying a telegraph line from Europe to America via the Faroe Islands, Iceland, and Greenland. The Fox, commanded by Allen Young who had already accompanied McClintock on the search for Franklin as sailing master, also took part. The northern telegraph route was a proposition by Colonel Taliaferro Shaffner. Although McClintock reported in favour of executing the plan, it never came to fruition.

== Later life ==
In 1865 McClintock was elected a Fellow of the Royal Society. From 1865 to 1868, he was appointed Commodore Jamaica Division, and he superintended Jamaica Dockyard. From 1872 to 1877, McClintock was admiral-superintendent of Portsmouth Dockyard. In 1879, he was appointed commander-in-chief of the North America and West Indies Station aboard the flagship HMS Northampton. McClintock retired from the Royal Navy in 1884 as a rear admiral. In 1882 he was elected an Elder Brother of Trinity House, and served actively in that capacity. He died on 17 November 1907 and was buried at Kensington Cemetery.

== Family ==
McClintock unsuccessfully contested a seat in parliament for the borough of Drogheda, but while there he made the acquaintance of Annette Delap, (later changed to Dunlop) and married her in 1870. She was the daughter of Robert Foster Delap (1809–1875) and Honourable Anna Elizabeth Foster (later Skeffington) 1817-1901. Robert Foster Delap's father, William Drummond Delap, changed their surname to Dunlop in 1861 by Special Licence.There were five children, including:

- Henry Foster McClintock, (1871–1959)
- John William Leopold McClintock (1874–1929), Vice-Admiral, RN
- Col. Robert S. McClintock. CMG, DSO (1876–1967), who married Mary Elphinstone, the youngest daughter of Major General Sir Howard Craufurd Elphinstone.
- Anna Elizabeth McClintock, (1873–1957) who married in 1902 Sir Bernard Eyre Greenwell, 2nd Baronet.
- Elizabeth Florence Mary (Bessie) (1882–1913) died unmarried.

== Bibliography ==
- McGoogan, K. (2002). Fatal passage: the story of John Rae, the Arctic hero time forgot. New York: Carroll & Graf. ISBN 9780786709939.
- Murphy, D. (2004). The Arctic Fox: Francis Leopold-McClintock, Discoverer of the Fate of Franklin. Toronto: Dundurn. ISBN 9781554883080.
