= Jamaica Division =

- Active: 1838–1905
- Country: United Kingdom
- Branch: Royal Navy
- Type: Division
- Part of: Royal Navy
- Garrison/HQ: Jamaica Dockyard, Port Royal, Jamaica

The Jamaica Division of the North America and West Indies Station was a sub-command of the British Royal Navy's North America and West Indies Station, head-quartered at Port Royal dockyard in Jamaica from 1838 to 1905.

== History ==
In 1830, the Jamaica Station merged with the North American Station to form the North America and West Indies Station. In 1838, the Royal Navy established a sub-command to the Commander-in-Chief, North America and West Indies Station. This sub-command was led by the Commodore of the Jamaica Division of North America and West Indies Station, who oversaw operations at the naval base until March 1905, when the dockyard was closed. In 1951, the Royal Naval Dockyard, Bermuda closed after which the new post of Senior Naval Officer, West Indies (SNOWI) was established as the West Indies Sub-Area Command under the Commander-in-Chief, Home Fleet. The office holder would hold the rank of Commodore.

The division primarily consisted of naval vessels assigned to this command but also included the shore establishment Jamaica Dockyard.

== Commodores on Jamaica Division ==
Post holders included:

| | Rank | Flag | Name | Term | Notes |
|---|---|---|---|---|---|
Commodore, on Jamaica Division of the North America and West Indies Station
| 1 | Commodore | | Sir John Strutt Peyton, K.C.H | 1838 - 1839 | |
| 2 | Commodore | | Sir Peter John Douglas | 1839 - 1843 | |
| 3 | Commodore | | the Hon. Henry Dilkes Byng | 26 July 1842 - 7 September 1843 | (brother of V.Adm George Byng) |
| 4 | Commodore | | Alexander Renton Sharpe C.B. | 8 September 1843 - 15 September 1845 | |
| 5 | Commodore | | Daniel Pring | 16 September 1845 - 29 November 1846 | |
post vacant 12/1847 - 01/1848
| 6 | Commodore | | Thomas Bennett | 7 February 1848 -1851 | (Adm, by 1865) |
post vacant 1852-1854
| 7 | Commodore | | Thomas Henderson | 3 October 1854 - 3 August 1855 | (and as Senior Officer, West Indies) |
post vacant 1856-1858
| 8 | Commodore | | Henry Kellett C.B. | 3 August 1855 16 March 1857/59 | (and as Senior Officer, West Indies) |
| 9 | Commodore | | Hugh Dunlop | November 1859-January 1864 | |
| 10 | Commodore | | Peter Cracroft C.B. | March 1864 – 1865 | |
| 11 | Commodore | | Algernon F.R. de Horsey | 1865 | (acting Cmdre) |
| 12 | Commodore | | F. Leopold McClintock | September 1865-February 1868 | |
| 13 | Commodore | | Augustus Phillimore | February 1868-December 1869 | |
| 14 | Commodore | | Richard W. Courtenay | December 1869-January 1872 | |
| 15 | Commodore | | Algernon F.R. de Horsey | January 1872-February 1875 | |
| 16 | Commodore | | Algernon McLennan Lyons | February 1875-February 1878 | |
| 17 | Commodore | | the Hon. William J. Ward | February 1878-August 1880 | |
| 18 | Commodore | | William S. Brown | August 1880-August 1882 | |
| 19 | Commodore | | John C. Purvis | August 1882-July 1883 | |
| 20 | Commodore | | Francis M. Prattent | July 1883-July 1886 | |
| 21 | Commodore | | Henry Hand | July 1886-September 1889 | |
| 22 | Commodore | | Rodney M. Lloyd | September 1889-September 1892 | (also styled Commodore-in-Charge, Jamaica) |
| 23 | Commodore | | Thomas S. Jackson | September 1892-September 1895 | ditto |
| 24 | Commodore | | Herbert W. Dowding | 1895-April 1898 | ditto |
| 25 | Commodore | | William H. Henderson | April 1898-February 1900 | ditto |
| 26 | Commodore | | Edward H.M. Davis C.M.G. | February 1900-May 1901 | ditto |
| 27 | Commodore | | Daniel McN. Riddel | May 1901-July 1903 | ditto |
| 28 | Commodore | | Frederic W. Fisher | July 1903-March 1905 | ditto |
