= Jamaica Dockyard =

British Royal Navy Dockyard

H.M. Dockyard, Jamaica
- Part of Jamaica Station (1675-1829), North America and West Indies Station, (1830-1905)
- Port Royal, Jamaica

Site information
- Operator: Royal Navy
- Controlled by: The Navy Board (1675-1832), Board of Admiralty (1832-1905)

Location
- Coordinates: 17.936°N 76.844°W

Site history
- In use: 1675-1905
- Fate: Naval Heritage Center

Jamaica Dockyard also known as Port Royal Dockyard was a British Royal Navy Dockyard located at Port Royal, Jamaica. It was established 1675 and closed in 1905. The dockyard was initially administered by the Navy Board then later the Board of Admiralty.

== History ==
In 1675 the British first made use of a wharf at Port Royal and assigned a resident Naval Officer to superintend these facilities;. Following the 1692 earthquake, Port Royal never fully recovered from its preeminent position as a major commercial center. Despite this the dockyard served as the headquarters of the British Royal Navy in the Caribbean. From the eighteenth century until the nineteenth century, various refurbishments and upgrade work were undertaken to improve its docks, facilities fortifications and. From 1735 new wharves and storehouses were built at this time, as well as housing for the officers of the Yard. Over the next thirty years, more facilities were added: cooperages, workshops, sawpits, and accommodation (including a canteen) for the crews of ships being careened there. by the end of the 18th century, a small Victualling Yard had been added to the east of the yard, prior to this ships had had to go to Kingston and other settlements to take on supplies) and in 1817 a Royal Naval Hospital was constructed the west of the yard. The dockyard and continued to be an important naval base until 1905 when it was closed. .

The dockyard was first administered by the Navy Board and later Board of Admiralty until 1869 after which it was administered as part of the Department of the Director Dockyards of the Admiralty. It was a component part of the Jamaica Station until 1830 then finally part of North America and West Indies Station until 1905.

== Administration of the dockyard and other key officials ==
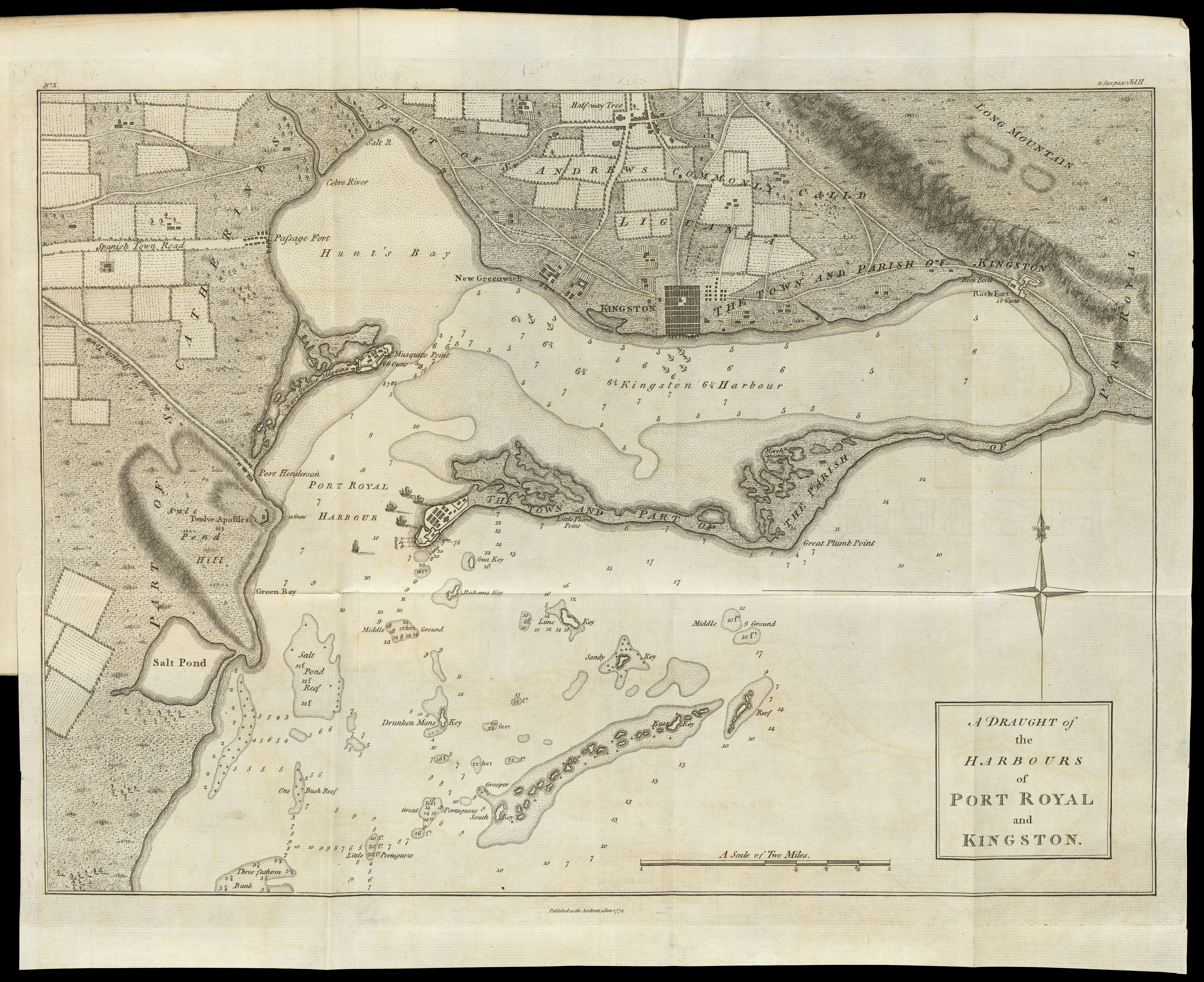
Port Royal and Kingston Harbours (map of 1774)

The Master Shipwright was usually the key official at the royal navy dockyards until the introduction of resident commissioners by the Navy Board who were responsible for administrating naval yards; after which he became deputy to the resident commissioner. In 1832 the post of commissioner was usually replaced by the post of admiral superintendent. However, the commissioner was replaced later by a Commodore-in-Charge, Jamaica.

=== Superintendent, Jamaica Dockyard ===
Post holders included:

1. 1724–1727, John Potter

=== Resident Commissioner of the Navy, Jamaica ===
Post holders included:

1. 1782–1784, Captain Alexander Lambert.
2. 1814–1820, Captain Daniel Woodriffe.
3. 1825–1827, Captain Thomas George Shortland.
4. 1827–1828, Captain Charles Inglis.
5. 1828–1832, Captain Thomas George Shortland.

=== Commodore in Charge, Naval Establishments Jamaica ===
Included:

1. 1838–1839, Commodore, Sir John Strutt Peyton.
2. 1839–1842, Commodore, Sir Peter John Douglas.
3. 1842–1843, Commodore, Hon. Henry Dilkes Byng.
4. 1843–1845, Commodore, Alexander Renton Sharpe.
5. 1845–1847, Commodore, Daniel Pring.
6. 1848–1851, Commodore, Thomas Bennett.
7. 1854–1855, Commodore, Thomas Henderson.
8. 1855–1857, Commodore, Henry Kellett.
9. 1859–1864, Commodore, Hugh Dunlop.
10. 1864–1865, Commodore, Peter Cracroft.
11. 1865, Acting Commodore, Algernon F.R. de Horsey.
12. 1865–1868, Commodore, F. Leopold McClintock.
13. 1868–1869, Commodore, Augustus Phillimore.
14. 1869–1872, Commodore, Richard W. Courtenay.
15. 1872–1875, Commodore, Algernon F.R. de Horsey.
16. 1875–1878, Commodore, Algernon McLennan Lyons.
17. 1878–1880, Commodore, Hon. William John Ward.
18. 1880–1882, Commodore, William Samuel Brown (Greive).
19. 1882, Mar-Aug, Commodore, Edward White.
20. 1883–1886, Commodore, Francis Mowbray Prattent.
21. 1886–1889, Commodore, Henry Hand.
22. 1889–1892, Commodore, Rodney M. Lloyd
23. 1892–1895, Commodore, Thomas S. Jackson.
24. 1895–1898, Commodore, Herbert W. Dowding.
25. 1898–1900, Commodore, William H. Henderson.
26. 1900–1901, Commodore, Edward H. M. Davis.
27. 1901–1904, Commodore Daniel McNab Riddel.
28. 1904–1905, Commodore Frederick. W, Fisher.

==== Master Shipwright, Jamaica ====
Post holders included:

1. 1734–1739, James Croucher.
2. 1739–1744, George Wales.
3. 1744–1747, Thomas Aldersone.
4. 1747–1748, Russel Tompkins.
5. 1748–1754, Jonathon Bowden.
6. 1754–1762, William Jerney.
7. 1762–1776, Lionel Beal.
8. 1776–1780, John North.
9. 1780–1784, Alexander Innes.
10. 1784–1793, John Bignall
11. 1793–1794, James Smith
12. 1814–1820, George Spiller.
13. 1820–1827, John Taff.
14. 1827–1828, George Hunter.

==== Master Attendant, Jamaica ====
Post holders included:

1. 1728–1731, James Patterson
2. 1731–1740, John Cock
3. 1779, William Forfar
4. 1814-1820 Francis Owen.
5. 1820–1825, William Oliver.
6. 1825–1828, William White.
7. 1901–1905, Henry H. Hatchard

==== Storekeeper, Jamaica ====
Post holders included:

1. 1727–1729, John Potter.
2. 1729 Aug-Sep, Nathaniel Shepherd.
3. 1729–1736, Edward Chiles.
4. 1736–1745, George Hinde
5. 1745–1747, William Campbell.
6. 1747–1750, Mathew Wallen.
7. 1750/-1770, John Patterson.
8. 1770–1775, James Burnett.
9. 1775–1780, Samuel Holman.
10. 1780, Robert Allen.

==== Naval Storekeeper, Jamaica ====
Included:

1. 1730–1739, Warner Tempest
2. 1814–1820, A. N. Yates.
3. 1820–1825, Charles H. Smith.
4. 1825–1828, Peter Mitch Magnan.

==== Naval and Victualling Store Officer ====
Included:

1. 1903–1905, J. H. Aitken Esq.

==== Chief Engineer, Jamaica ====
Included:

1. 1903–1905, Engineer Lieutenant, Victor E. Snook.

== Sources ==
1. Archives, National (1708–1802). "Royal Naval dockyard staff: Port Royal Dockyard, Jamaica". The National Archives. London, England: The National Archives.
2. Coad, Jonathan (2013). Support for the Fleet: architecture and engineering of the Royal Navy's bases 1700–1914. Swindon: English Heritage
3. Clowes, Sir William Laird (1897–1903). The royal navy, a history from the earliest times to the present Volume III (1763–1792). London, England: S. Low Marston.
4. Cundall, Frank (1915). Historic Jamaica : With fifty-two illustrations. England: London : Published for the Institute of Jamaica by the West India Committee.
5. Harley, Simon; Lovell, Tony (2018). "Jamaica - The Dreadnought Project". dreadnoughtproject.org. Harley and Lovell.
6. Harrison, Simon; (2010–2018), Jamaica Dockyard. https://threedecks.org.
7. Mackie, Colin. (2019), "Royal Navy Senior Appointments from 1865: Commodore, Jamaica". gulabin.com. Colin Mackie.
8. Office, Admiralty (December 1814). The Navy List. London, England: John Murray.
9. Office, Admiralty (January 1820). The Navy List. London, England: John Murray.
10. Office, Admiralty (December 1827). The Navy List. London, England: John Murray.
11. Office, Admiralty (March 1828). The Navy List. London, England: John Murray.
