= List of Royal Navy ships in North America =

List of Royal Navy ships in North America is an annotated list of some of the Royal Navy ships serving in Canada, the Thirteen Colonies and Caribbean under the North American Station.

== List ==
Ship names and details
Ship name	Type	Launched	Ship details	Fate
HMS Sapphire	32-gun ship of the line	1675 Harwich, England		Cornered in Bay Bulls Harbour by a French squadron in September 1696. Her master, Captain Thomas Cleasby, in fear that the French would capture the ship, scuttled her.
HMS Leopard	50-gun ship of the line	1775 in Portsmouth, England		Destroyed in 1814 off Anticosti Island, Quebec
HMS Speedy	Schooner	1798 – Kingston, Ontario		Sunk in Lake Ontario off Brighton, Ontario in 1804
HMS Sir Isaac Brock	—N/a	—N/a	Unfinished vessel was being built in York, Upper Canada – now Toronto	Burned and destroyed during War of 1812
HMS Detroit (1812)	6-gun brig; 200 tons	1812 – Detroit, Michigan	Captured by British forces and renamed Detroit	Burned in 1813
HMS Detroit (1813)	12- or 14-gun schooner, 305 tons	1813 in Amherstburg, Ontario	Captured by Americans and renamed USS Detroit in 1813	Sold in 1825
HMS Confiance	36-gun frigate	1814 in Île aux Noix, Lake Champlain – near Plattsburgh, New York	Served on Lake Champlain	Captured by Americans and sold in 1825
HMS Linnet	16-gun brig	1814 in Île aux Noix, Lake Champlain – near Plattsburgh, New York	Served on Lake Champlain; capture 1814
HMS Chub (I)	4-gun schooner	1807 in Bermuda		Sunk off Halifax, Nova Scotia 1812
HMS Finch / HMS Chubb (II) / HMS Shannon	11-gun sloop captured from the Americans (ex-USS Growler); 110 tons	1812?	Served on Lake Champlain; captured 1813 and renamed Shannon (and later as Chubb)	Recaptured by the Americans in 1814 and sold 1815 in Whitehall, New York
HMS Nancy	6-gun schooner	1789 in Detroit, Michigan	Served in upper Great Lakes; fitted with six 4-pounder carriage guns and six swivel guns	Sank in Nottawasaga River in 1814 after being chased by Niagara, Tigress, and Scorpion
HMS Duke of Gloucester	10-gun brig	1813 in Kingston, Ontario	Captured by Americans in 1813, renamed York
HMS Royal George	20-gun sloop	1809 in Kingston, Ontario	Took part in several engagements on Lake Ontario	Renamed Niagara (1814) and later laid up and broken up in 1833
HMS Toronto	4-gun sloop	1799 in York, Upper Canada (now Toronto)	Built as government ferry	Sank 1811 off Hanlan's Point
HMS St. Lawrence	112-gun ship of the line	1814 in Kingston, Ontario	Only ship to be built and operated on Great Lakes	Decommissioned in 1815? and broken up
HMS Hamilton	Schooner; 53 tons	1812 from American builder on Lake Ontario	Captured as USS Growler 1813; re-captured by Americans 1813 and re-captured by RN in 1814	Renamed HMS Hamilton 1814; fate unknown
HMS Erebus	18-gun sloop; converted rocket vessel	1807
HMS Nymph	Sloop	1778 at Chatham Dockyard, Kent, England		Flounder in Road Town, British Virgin Islands
HMS Resolute	Arctic exploration ship	Purchased in 1850 as Ptarmigan		Retired 1879 and broken up
HMS Halifax (1768)	Schooner	1768	Built at Halifax, Nova Scotia, the first Royal Navy ship built in Canada	Lost 1775
HMS Halifax (1780)	Sloop	1777 as United States Navy USS Ranger	Captured 1780	Decommissioned in 1781
HMS Halifax (1806)	Sloop	1806	Built at the Halifax, Nova Scotia	Decommissioned and broken up in 1814
HMS Drake	Sloop	Purchased as Resolution in 1777		Captured by USS Ranger, 24 April 1778
HMS Sultana	Schooner	1767 in Boston Shipyard	Patrolled the American coast from 1768 through 1772	Sold 1772
HMS Antelope	54-gun ship of the line	Formerly Antelope from 1803	served in the Seven Years' War and the American Revolutionary War.	Sold 1783
HMS Fame	74-gun ship of the line	1759 in Deptford, near London, England	Served later as prison ship	Sold 1814
HMS Invincible	74-gun ship of the line	Built in London 1765	Served in Seven Years' War, American Revolutionary War, Battle of Cape St. Vincent in 1780, Battle of the Chesapeake in 1781 and Battle of St. Kitts in 1782	Sank 1801

== Shipyards ==
A list of shipyards of NAS:

- Halifax Naval Yard, Nova Scotia
- Oswego, New York
- Pointe au Baril, Ontario
- Navy Island, Ontario
- Niagara
- Detroit, Michigan
- Oswegatchie
- Carleton Island
- Raven Creek
- Kingston, Ontario
- Prince Edward County, Ontario
- York, Upper Canada
- Amherstburg, Ontario
- Cleveland, Ohio
- Black Rock
- Presqu'Ile, Pennsylvania
- Erie, Pennsylvania
- Quebec, Quebec
- Penetanguishene, Ontario
- Chippawa, Ontario
- Ganaoque, Ontario
- Cobourg, Ontario
- Grand Island, New York
- Montreal, Quebec
- Buffalo, New York
- Sorel, Quebec
- Levis, Quebec
- Stromness
- Sarnia, Ontario

Some ships were shipped over from yards in England:

- Newcastle
- Portsmouth

== Sources ==
- USS Growler
- List of Vessels Employed on British Naval Service on the Great Lakes, 1755–1875
