= HMAS Encounter (1902) =

British and Australian naval cruiser

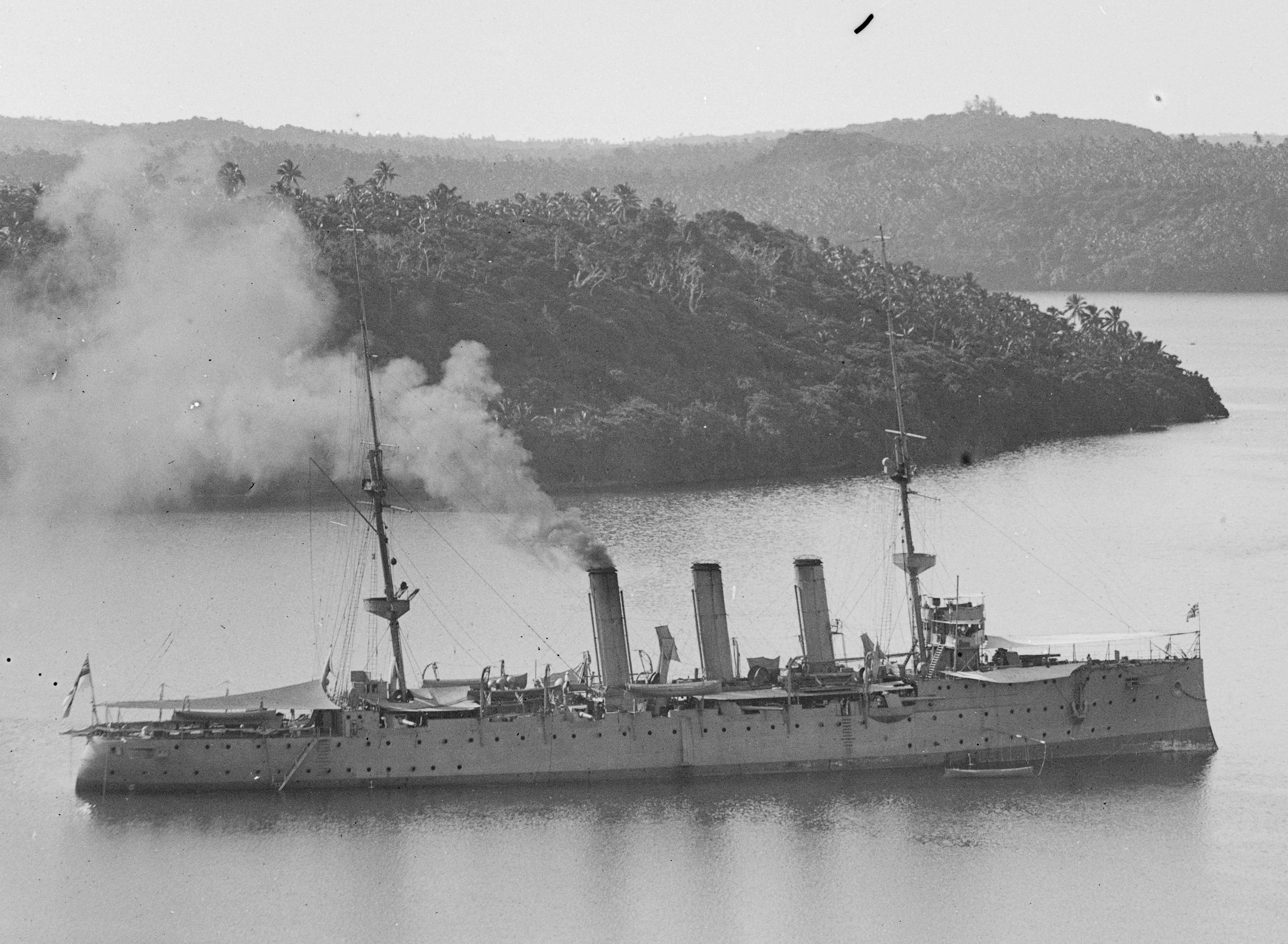
- HMAS Encounter at Vavaʻu, Tonga in April 1911

History

United Kingdom
- Name: Encounter
- Builder: HM Dockyard Devonport
- Laid down: 28 January 1901
- Launched: 18 June 1902
- Christened: Lady Sturges Jackson
- Completed: 6 December 1905
- Commissioned: 21 November 1905
- Fate: Transferred to the Royal Australian Navy

Australia
- Name: Encounter
- Acquired: 1912, permanently transferred 5 December 1919
- Commissioned: 1 July 1912
- Decommissioned: 15 August 1929
- Renamed: HMAS Penguin (May 1923)
- Reclassified: Submarine depot ship (May 1923)
- Motto: "Show the Flag"
- Nickname(s): "The Old Bus"
- Honours and awards: Battle honours: Rabaul 1914
- Fate: Scuttled off Sydney Heads, 14 September 1932
- Badge

General characteristics
- Class & type: Challenger-class cruiser
- Displacement: 5,880 long tons (5,970 t) standard
- Length: 376 ft 1.75 in (114.65 m) overall; 355 ft (108.20 m) between perpendiculars
- Beam: 56 ft 2.125 in (17.12 m)
- Draught: 21.25 ft (6.48 m)
- Propulsion: Keyham 4-cylinder triple expansion steam engine, 12,500 hp (9,300 kW), two shafts
- Speed: 21 knots (38.9 km/h; 24.2 mph)
- Complement: RN: 475; RAN: 26 officers, 269 sailors
- Armament: As completed: 11 × BL 6-inch (152 mm) guns; 9 × QF 12-pounder 12 cwt (3-inch) guns; 6 × QF 3-pounder (47 mm) guns; 3 × machine guns; 2 × 18-inch (450 mm) torpedo tubes

HMAS Encounter was a second-class protected cruiser of the Challenger class operated by the Royal Navy (RN) and Royal Australian Navy (RAN). She was built by HM Dockyard Devonport and completed at the end of 1905.

Encounter spent the first six years of her career operating with the RN's Australia Squadron, before being transferred to the newly formed RAN. During World War I, the cruiser became the first ship of the RAN to fire in anger when she bombarded Toma Ridge. Encounter operated in the New Guinea, Fiji-Samoa, and Malaya areas until 1916, when she returned to Australian waters. The ship spent the rest of the war patrolling and escorting convoys around Australia and into the Indian Ocean. In 1919, Encounter was sent to evacuate the Administrator of the Northern Territory and his family following the Darwin Rebellion.

Encounter was paid off into reserve in 1920, but saw further use as a depot ship until being completely decommissioned in 1929. In 1932, the cruiser was scuttled off Sydney.

== Design and construction ==
Challenger class vessels had a standard displacement of 5,880 tons, a length of 376 feet 1.75 inches (114.6493 m) overall and 355 feet (108 m) between perpendiculars, a beam of 56 feet 2.125 inches (17.12278 m), and a draught of 21.25 feet (6.48 m). The cruisers were propelled by a Keyham 4-cylinder triple expansion steam engine, which provided 12,500 horsepower to two propeller shafts, allowing her to reach speeds just over 21 knots (39 km/h; 24 mph). Her economical cruising speed was 10 knots (19 km/h; 12 mph), which allowed the ship to travel 5,436 nautical miles (10,067 km) before exhausting her 1,314 tons of coal. In British service, the ship's company stood at 450, but while operated by the RAN, this was reduced to 29 officers and 269 sailors.

She was among the first ships of the Royal Navy to receive water-tube Dürr boilers.

As completed, the ship's armament consisted of eleven BL 6-inch Mk VII naval guns, nine QF 12-pounder 12 cwt naval guns, six 3-pounder guns, three machine guns, and two 18-inch (450-mm) torpedo tubes mounted broadside. By the 1920s, the 6-inch and 12-pounder guns had been reduced to three and four respectively, although a 12-pounder field gun was added to the ship's arsenal. A single QF 3-pounder Hotchkiss gun replaced the six 3-pounders, while the original three machine guns were supplanted by four Maxim guns and two Lewis guns.

Encounter was laid down for the RN by HM Dockyard at Devonport in Plymouth on 28 January 1901. The ship was launched on 18 June 1902, when the naming ceremony was performed by Lady Sturges Jackson, wife of Vice-Admiral Sir Thomas Sturges Jackson, Admiral-Superintendent of Devonport Dockyard. She was commissioned into the Royal Navy on 21 November 1905, and completed on 16 December 1905. The ship sailed for Australia on 31 December.

== Operational history ==
From April 1906 to June 1912, Encounter served as part of the RN Australia Squadron. In 1909, 15 of her crew drowned when a naval longboat was run over by the small coastal steamer Dunmore in Sydney Harbour. Herbert Wilson, a petty officer aboard Encounter, published his personal log covering 1910–1912, including an account of the British expeditions to Vavaʻu for the total solar eclipse of 28 April 1911. On 1 July 1912, the ship was commissioned into the RAN on loan, for use until HMAS Brisbane was completed.

=== World War I ===
Assigned to the Pacific Station during 1914–15, Encounter was part of the force which occupied German New Guinea. In the course of that operation, she captured the steamer Zambezi on 12 August and, on 14 September, bombarded Toma Ridge to support the Australian Military and Naval Expeditionary Force which was besieging the town. That action made her the first RAN ship to fire in anger. She covered the landing at Madang on 24 September. In October, she was sent to the Fiji-Samoa area. During a patrol of the region on 25 April 1915, Encounter captured the German sailing vessel Elfriede.

In 1915, Encounter underwent refit in Sydney, then sailed on 21 July to transport a garrison to Fanning Island. Sometime in 1915, the ship sustained hull damage from a coral reef at Johnson Island. Temporary repairs were made at Suva, before the ship sailed to Hong Kong for permanent repairs. The cruiser also operated in the Malay archipelago during early 1916, but was recalled to Australian waters on 11 February 1916, because all other RAN ships had been deployed elsewhere.

In July 1916, during a visit to an unnamed island off the coast of Western Australia, two bronze cannons were discovered by Encounter officers Commander C.W. Stevens and Surgeon Lieutenant W. Roberts. The latter described:

approximately 25 paces from the water’s edge, we saw the two carronades protruding, through the sand 2/3rds of each being exposed so that they were easily lifted out. They were ... 6 feet apart and certainly had the appearance of leading marks ... a large number of the ship’s company landed and next day, shifted sand over practically the whole area for a considerable depth. The only other object found was a small portion of a brass bound chest. You can imagine the disappointment of the matelots who had visions of buried treasure

— Surgeon Commander Roberts, Letter from Surgeon Commander Roberts, 18 August 1933.

Because the guns were erroneously thought to be carronades, the place was named "Carronade Island".

On 12 January 1917, Encounter was ordered to New Zealand, where she met a convoy of Australian and New Zealand troopships. The cruiser remained with the convoy until a rendezvous point in the Indian Ocean, where responsibility was handed over to ships of the East Indies Station. On 6 July, Encounter assisted SS Cumberland, which had struck a mine off Gabo Island. In August, the cruiser assisted in the search for the missing merchantman SS Matunga; it was not known until 1918 that she had been a victim of the German raider Wolf. The ship visited Mopelia Island in September 1917, to search for the wreck of the German raider Seeadler.

From December 1917 until April 1918, Encounter underwent refit in Sydney, and then returned to Western Australia. The ship travelled between Fremantle and Sydney several times before the end of the war. The cruiser's wartime activities were later recognised with the battle honour "Rabaul 1914".

=== Post-war ===
In early 1919, Encounter was sent to Darwin to protect Administrator John Gilruth, following the Darwin Rebellion. Gilruth and his family boarded her on 20 February 1919 and were taken to Melbourne. The ship was permanently transferred to the RAN on 5 December 1919. The ship was used in a training role, and acquired the nickname "the Old Bus".

Encounter paid off into reserve on 30 September 1920. She was assigned to the naval base at Garden Island as a depot ship in May 1923, and was renamed HMAS Penguin. The ship was decommissioned on 15 August 1929. She was scuttled on 14 September 1932 off Bondi Beach, Sydney. Encounter lies at a depth of around 74 metres (243 ft) and is dived regularly.

== Gallery ==
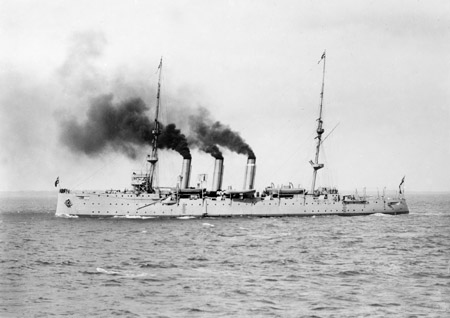
Portside view HMAS Encounter

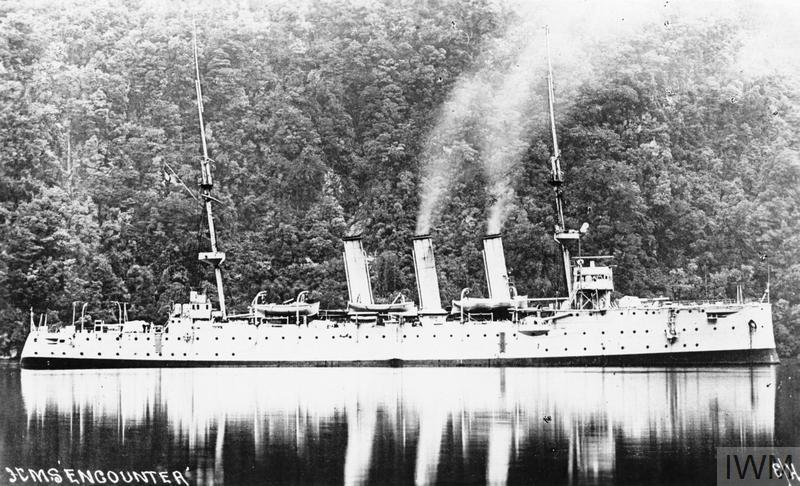
Encounter

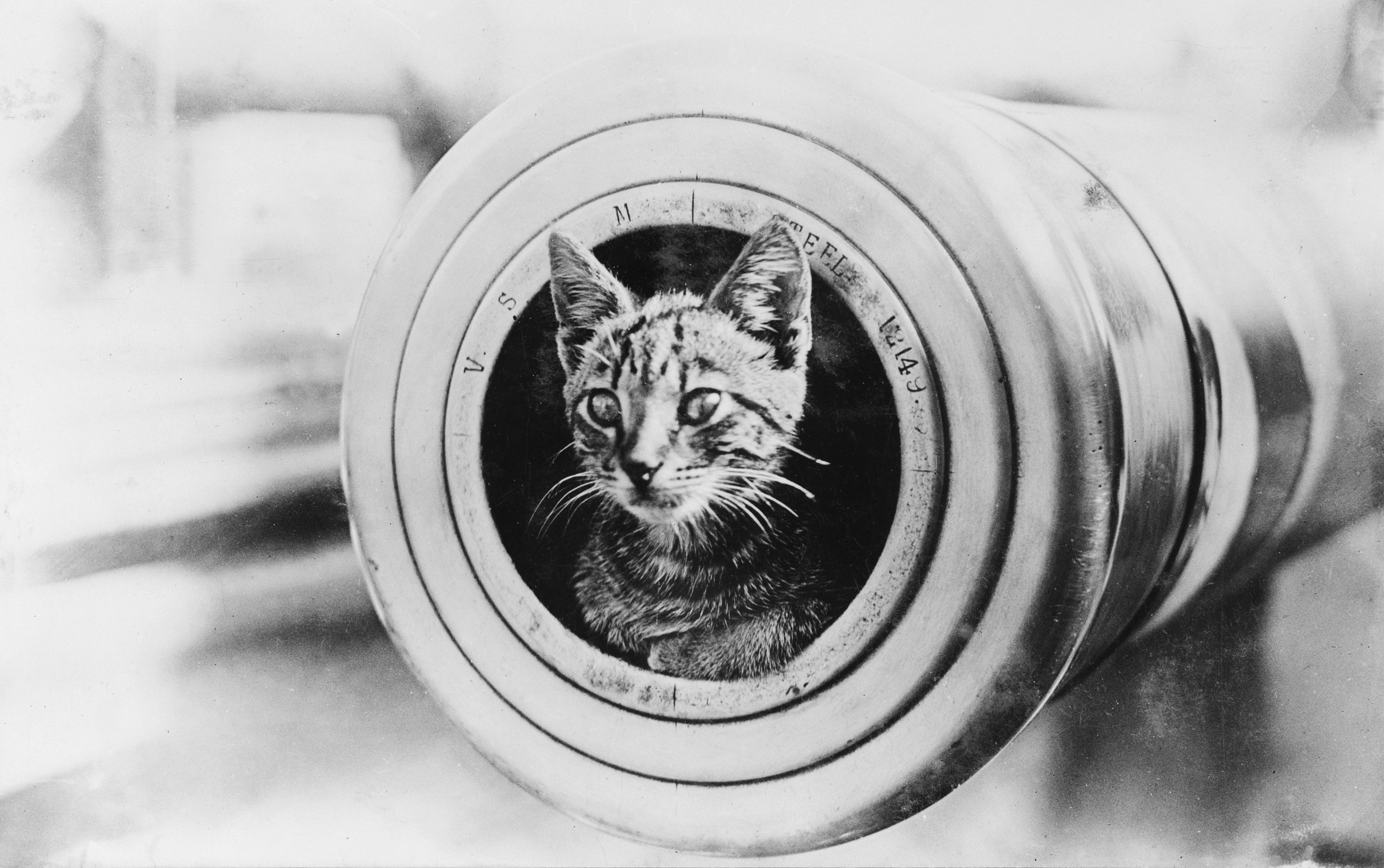
Encounter's ship's cat sitting in the muzzle of a 6-inch gun
