= HMS Challenger (1902) =

Cruiser of the Royal Navy

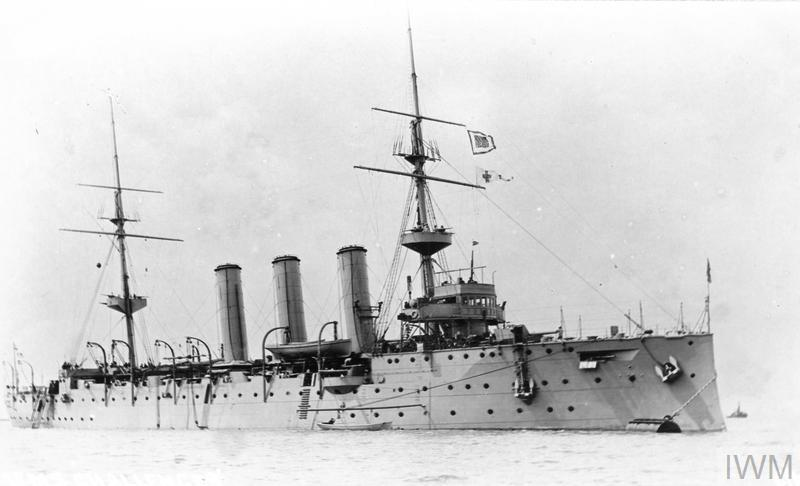
- Challenger

History

United Kingdom
- Name: HMS Challenger
- Builder: HM Dockyard Chatham
- Laid down: 1 December 1900
- Launched: 27 May 1902
- Christened: Mrs. Eva Holland
- Completed: 1904
- Fate: Broken up for scrap in 1920

General characteristics
- Class & type: Challenger-class protected cruiser
- Displacement: 5,900 tons
- Length: 355 ft (108.2 m)
- Beam: 56 ft (17.1 m)
- Draught: 21 ft 8 in (6.60 m)
- Propulsion: 12,500 horsepower
- Speed: 21 knots (39 km/h)
- Armament: 11 × BL 6-inch (152.4 mm) Mk VII guns; 8 × 12 pounder guns; 6 × 3-pounder guns; 2 × 18-inch (450-mm) torpedo tubes

HMS Challenger was a second-class protected cruiser of the Challenger-class of the Royal Navy.

== Construction ==
Challenger was designed by Sir William Henry White, Director of Naval Construction, and was built at the Chatham Dockyard, where she was laid down on 1 December 1900. She was launched there on 27 May 1902, when she was named by Eva Holland, wife of Rear-Admiral S. C. Holland, Admiral-Superintendent of Chatham Dockyard.

Her machinery was made by the Wallsend Slipway & Engineering Company, and there were 12 boilers of the Babcock & Wilcox type.

== Service history ==
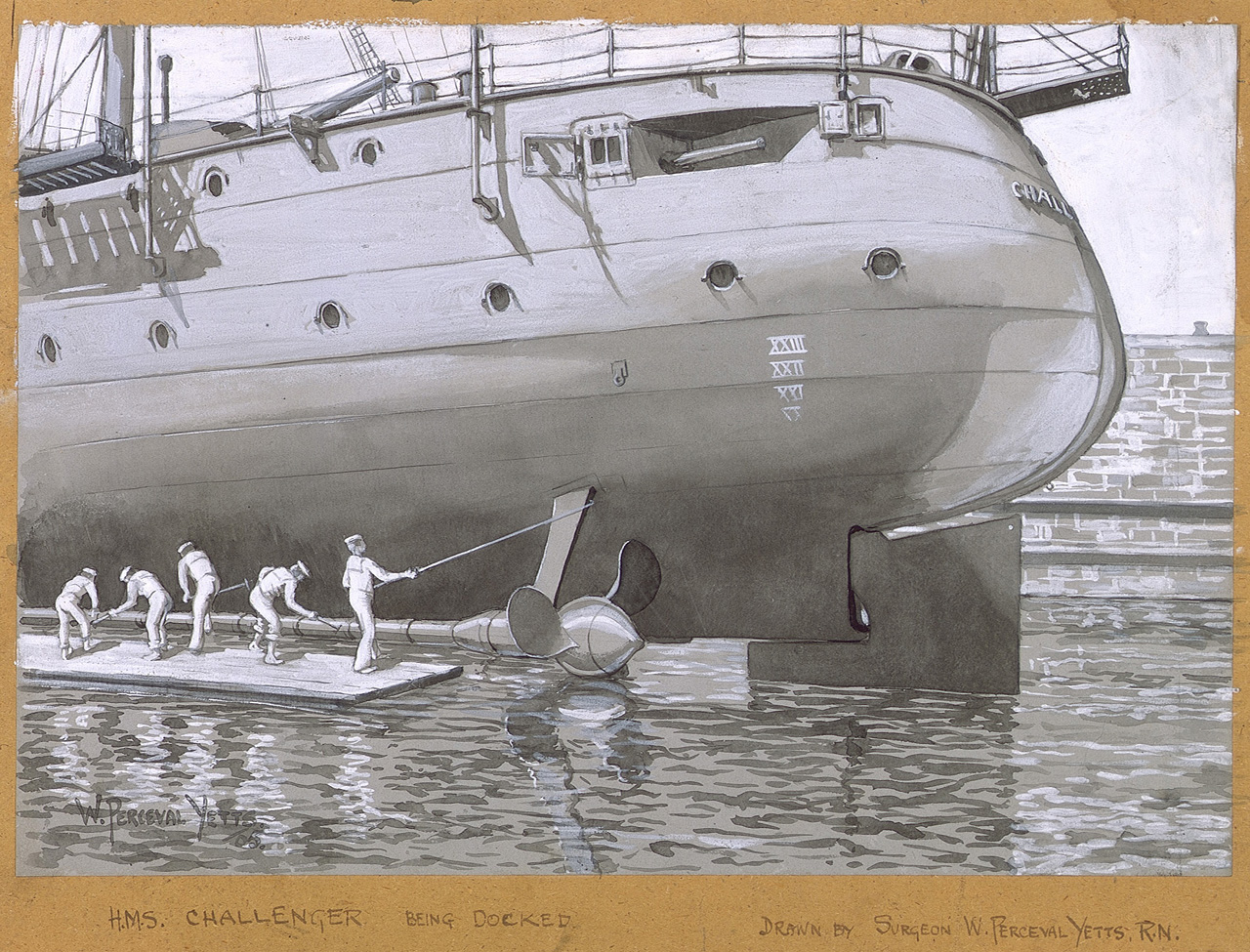
Challenger being docked in 1905

Challenger was commissioned by Captain F.C.T. Tudor, R.N., on 3 May 1904, and commenced duty on the Australia Station in July 1904 as recruit training ship. She was paid off into reserve on 10 October 1912 before recommissioning during the First World War. She initially served as part of the Ninth Cruiser Squadron off West Africa before serving in East African waters. She was sold in 1920 and was broken up for scrap.
