= HMS Melville (1817) =

Ship of the line of the Royal Navy

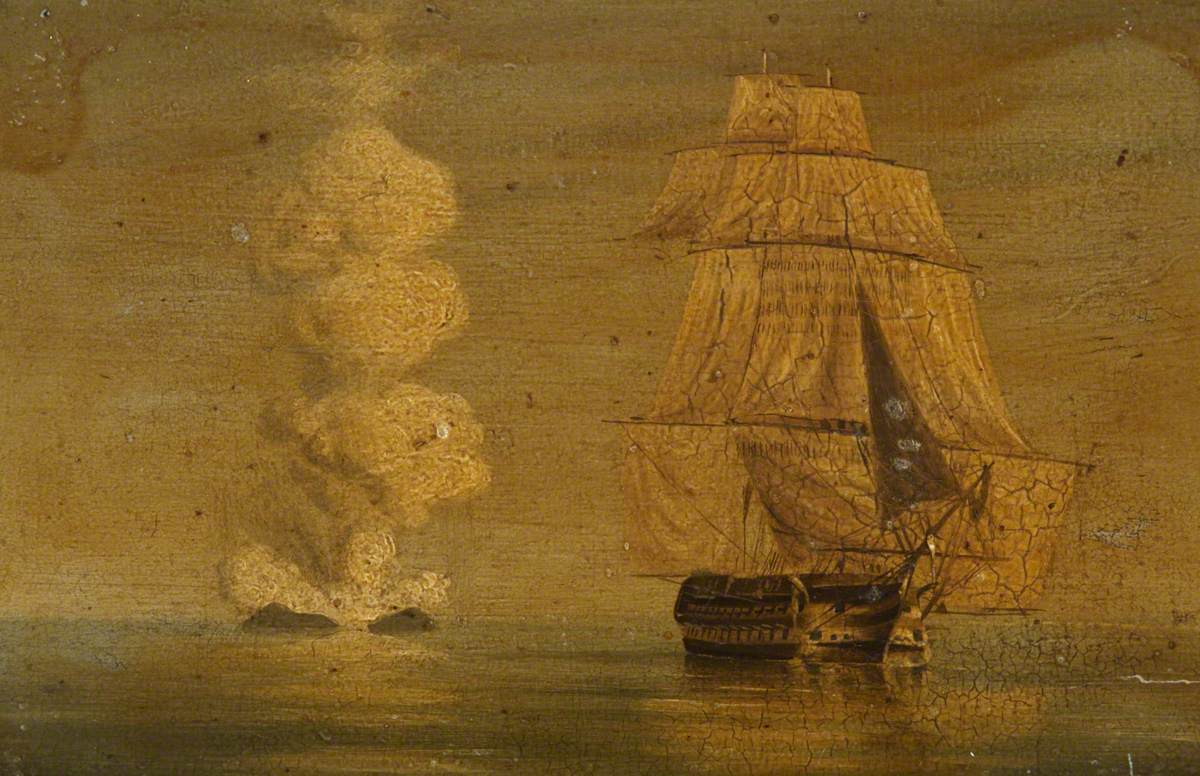
- HMS Melville guarding Graham Island

History

United Kingdom
- Name: HMS Melville
- Ordered: 6 September 1813
- Builder: Bombay Dockyard
- Laid down: July 1815
- Launched: 17 February 1817
- Fate: Sold, 1873

General characteristics
- Class & type: Black Prince-class ship of the line
- Tons burthen: 1768 bm
- Length: 176 ft (54 m) (gundeck)
- Beam: 47 ft 6 in (14.48 m)
- Depth of hold: 21 ft (6.4 m)
- Propulsion: Sails
- Sail plan: Full-rigged ship
- Armament: 74 guns: Gun deck: 28 × 32-pdrs; Upper gun deck: 28 × 18-pdrs; Quarterdeck: 4 × 12-pdrs, 10 × 32-pdr carronades; Forecastle: 2 × 12-pdrs, 2 × 32-pdr carronades; Poop deck: 6 × 18-pdr carronades

HMS Melville was a 74-gun third rate ship of the line of the Royal Navy, launched on 17 February 1817 at Bombay Dockyard.

From 19 January 1836 until August 1837 she served in North America and the West Indies as the flagship of Vice-Admiral Peter Halkett and was commanded by Captain Peter John Douglas. From 1 September 1837 to 1841 she was the flagship of Rear-Admiral George Elliot and was captained by Richard Saunders Dundas, during this time she served at the Cape of Good Hope and in the East Indies and was present during the First Opium War with China.

During the Opium War, 32 officers, 351 sailors and 75 Royal Marines served aboard her of whom 16 sailors and four marines would be killed in action at the capture of the Bocca Tigris on 7 January 1841 and the subsequent campaign along the Pearl River to Canton.

She was converted to serve as a hospital ship in 1857, and was sold out of the navy in 1873. Her sale in Hong Kong raised HK$35,000 which was used to purchase the Royal Naval Hospital at Mount Shadwell.
