= Challenger-class cruiser =

Early 20th-century British naval ship class

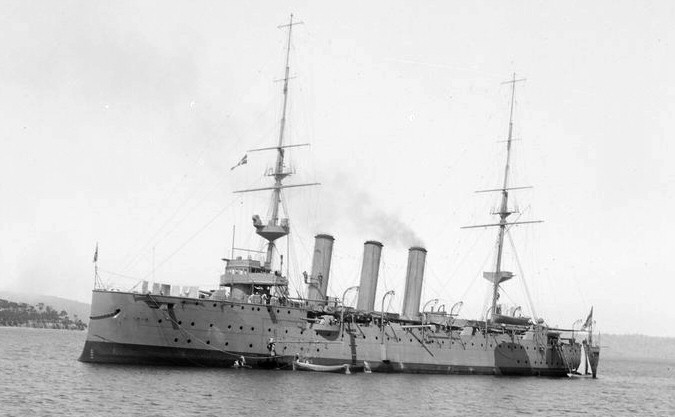
- HMS Challenger

Class overview
- Name: Challenger
- Operators: Royal Navy; Royal Australian Navy
- Preceded by: Highflyer class
- Succeeded by: Topaze class
- Built: 1900–1905
- In commission: 1904–1929
- Completed: 2
- Scrapped: 2

General characteristics (as built)
- Type: Protected cruiser
- Displacement: 5,880 long tons (5,970 t)
- Length: 355 ft (108.2 m) (p/p)
- Beam: 56 ft (17.1 m)
- Draught: 21 ft 3 in (6.5 m)
- Installed power: 12,500 ihp (9,300 kW); 18 water-tube boilers
- Propulsion: 2 shafts, 2 Triple-expansion steam engines
- Speed: 21 knots (38.9 km/h; 24.2 mph)
- Complement: 490
- Armament: 11 × BL 6-inch (152 mm) guns; 8 × QF 12-pounder 12 cwt (3-inch) guns (Note: "Cwt" is the abbreviation for hundredweight, 20 cwt referring to the weight of the gun.); 1 × QF 12-pounder 8 cwt gun; 6 × QF 3-pounder (47 mm) guns; 2 × 18-inch (450 mm) torpedo tubes
- Armour: Deck: 1.5–3 in (38.1–76.2 mm); Gun shields: 3 in (76 mm); Conning tower: 6 in (152 mm)

The Challenger-class cruisers were a pair of second-class protected cruisers built for the Royal Navy in the first decade of the 20th century. One ship, HMS Encounter, was later transferred to the Royal Australian Navy.

== Design and description ==
The Challenger-class cruisers were essentially repeats of the previous Highflyer class, albeit with more powerful propulsion machinery. They were designed to displace 5,880 long tons (5,970 t). The ships had a length between perpendiculars of 355 feet (108.2 m), a beam of 56 feet (17.1 m) and a draught of 21 feet 3 inches (6.5 m). Their crew consisted of 490 officers and other ranks.

The ships were powered by two 4-cylinder triple-expansion steam engines, each driving one shaft, using steam provided by 18 Babcock & Wilcox (Challenger) or Dürr (Encounter) water-tube boilers. These boilers were heavier and bulkier, but more powerful than the Belleville boilers used in the Highflyer class. Sir William White, Director of Naval Construction, was uncertain if the extra power would offset the weight sufficiently to reach 21 knots (39 km/h; 24 mph) and rated the ships at 20.75 knots (38.43 km/h; 23.88 mph). The boilers were designed to produce enough steam to allow the engines to reach 12,500 indicated horsepower (9,300 kW). The ships easily exceeded their designed power and speeds during their sea trials. They carried a maximum of 1,150 long tons (1,170 t) of coal.

The main armament of the Challenger class consisted of 11 quick-firing (QF) 6-inch (152 mm) Mk I guns. One gun was mounted on the forecastle and two others were positioned on the quarterdeck. The remaining eight guns were placed port and starboard amidships. They had a maximum range of approximately 10,000 yards (9,100 m) with their 100-pound (45 kg) shells. Eight QF 12-pounder 12 cwt guns were fitted for defence against torpedo boats. One additional 12-pounder 8 cwt gun could be dismounted for service ashore. They also carried six 3-pounder Hotchkiss guns and two submerged 18-inch (450 mm) torpedo tubes.

The ships' protective deck armour ranged in thickness from 1.5 to 3 inches (38 to 76 mm). The engine hatches were protected by 5-inch (127 mm) of armour. The main guns were fitted with 3-inch gun shields and the conning tower had armour 6 inches thick.

== Ships ==
- HMS Challenger - Sold 1920
- HMS Encounter - To Australia in 1912 as HMAS Encounter, renamed Penguin 1923, scuttled 1932.

== Bibliography ==
- Chesneau, Roger & Kolesnik, Eugene M., eds. (1979). Conway's All the World's Fighting Ships 1860–1905. Greenwich: Conway Maritime Press. ISBN 0-8317-0302-4.
- Corbett, Julian. Naval Operations to the Battle of the Falklands. History of the Great War: Based on Official Documents. Vol. I (2nd, reprint of the 1938 ed.). London and Nashville, Tennessee: Imperial War Museum and Battery Press. ISBN 0-89839-256-X.
- Friedman, Norman (2012). British Cruisers of the Victorian Era. Barnsley, South Yorkshire, UK: Seaforth. ISBN 978-1-59114-068-9.
- Friedman, Norman (2011). Naval Weapons of World War One. Barnsley, South Yorkshire, UK: Seaforth. ISBN 978-1-84832-100-7.
- Gardiner, Robert & Gray, Randal, eds. (1985). Conway's All the World's Fighting Ships 1906–1921. Annapolis, Maryland: Naval Institute Press. ISBN 0-85177-245-5.
