= HMS Starling (1829) =

Cutter of the Royal Navy

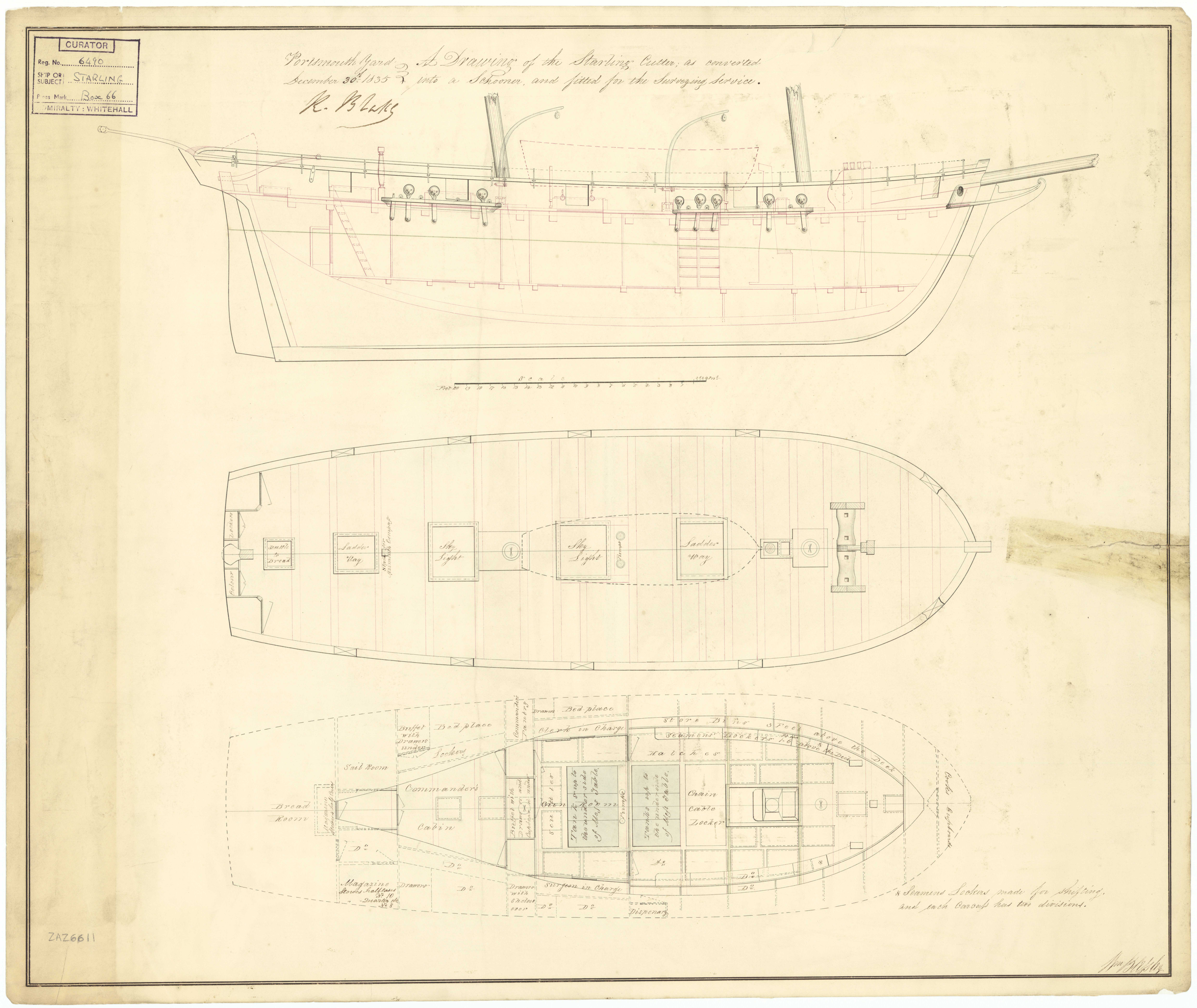
- Drawing of the Starling, 1835

History

United Kingdom
- Name: HMS Starling
- Namesake: Starling
- Ordered: 8 December 1828
- Builder: Pembroke Dockyard
- Laid down: June 1829
- Launched: 31 September 1829
- Reclassified: Converted to survey ship, 1834
- Fate: Sold, February 1844

General characteristics
- Class & type: Lark-class cutter
- Tons burthen: 107 73/94 tons bm
- Length: 60 ft 9 in (18.5 m) (gundeck); 49 ft 5 in (15.1 m) (keel)
- Beam: 20 ft 3 in (6.2 m)
- Depth of hold: 9 ft (2.7 m)
- Sail plan: Schooner rig
- Complement: 34
- Armament: 2 × 6-pounder carronades; 2 × 6-pounder guns

EIC ship Nemesis, with boats from the Sulphur, Calliope, Larne and Starling, destroying Chinese war junks in Anson's Bay, on 7 January 1841.

HMS Starling was a 4-gun schooner of the British Royal Navy, one of the two ships in an expedition led by Edward Belcher to survey the Pacific coast of the Americas.Henry Kellett was captain of the ship in the First Opium War with China.
