= Peter John Douglas =

Royal Navy Vice-Admiral (1787–1858)

Vice-Admiral Peter John Douglas
- Born: 30 June 1787; Portsmouth, Hampshire
- Died: 17 December 1858 (aged 71); Southsea, Hampshire
- Military career
- Allegiance: United Kingdom of Great Britain and Ireland
- Branch: Royal Navy
- Rank: Vice-Admiral
- Commands: HMS Reindeer; HMS Polyphemus; HMS Melville; Jamaica Division; North America and West Indies Station
- Conflicts: French Revolutionary Wars; Napoleonic Wars; Walcheren Campaign

Vice-Admiral Peter John Douglas (30 June 1787 – 17 December 1858) was an officer of the Royal Navy who served during the French Revolutionary and Napoleonic Wars.

He was born at Portsmouth on 30 June 1787, the son of Admiral Billy Douglas. He entered the Navy on 17 January 1797 and during the next six years served on a variety of ships, including the 90-gun HMS Sandwich, commanded by his father.

In March 1804, he was appointed Acting-Lieutenant of the sloop HMS Beaver for his conduct in proceeding up the river Elbe with the boats of that sloop, and capturing five vessels which had forced the blockade. On 25 October 1805 Douglas, whilst serving on the frigate HMS Franchise, commanded one of the ship's boats at the capture, on the north side of Jamaica, of the privateer General Ferrand, and, on the night of 6 January 1806, he had charge of the barge, and elicited the highest approbation for his promptitude and gallantry at the taking, in the Bay of Campeche, of the Spanish corvette Raposa, at which he was wounded. Douglas was subsequently presented by the Lloyd's Patriotic Fund with a sword.

Prior to leaving the Franchise, he further served in the boats at the capture of the Spanish schooner Carmen, and on board that ship he succeeded in making two prizes, and in driving an armed vessel on shore.

In 1808 Douglas was commanding the brig-sloop HMS Reindeer and captured four privateers within as many months. He subsequently served under Captain Charles Dashwood at the capture, towards the close of 1808, of the town of Samana, St. Domingo. On his passage to England he captured the French schooner Mouche, on 9 March 1809. He co-operated with Commodore Edward Owen's advanced division in the East Scheldt during the Walcheren Campaign.

Captain Douglas was paid off on 16 November 1812 and was unable to gain employment until 19 January 1836 when he returned to the West Indies with HMS Melville as flag captain to Peter Halkett.

On 30 March 1838, he was appointed Commodore on the Division of North America and West Indies Station and superintended the naval establishment Jamaica Dockyard and in the November following he was sent in command of a large squadron to the Gulf of Mexico, to mediate between the French and Mexican governments. He afterwards, during the intervals occasioned by the deaths of Vice-Admirals Sir Charles Paget and Sir Thomas Harvey, officiated, from 29 January to 24 May 1839, and from 28 May to 1 October 1841, as Commander-in-Chief on the North America and West Indies Station.

He was later promoted to rear-admiral, and died on 17 December 1858 in Southsea, Hampshire. He had married on 13 April 1809 in Chatham, Kent, Lydia Moriarty, eldest daughter of Vice-Admiral Sylverius Moriarty, by whom he had four daughters and two sons, of whom the eldest, William Manners Wellington, served in the navy. His eldest daughter married Captain W. Campbell Onslow, Superintendent of Coorg, in the East Indies; his second married Robert Pollock, second son of Sir Frederick Pollock, the Lord Chief Baron of the Exchequer; his third married Alexander Henry Gordon (grandson of Lord Rockville), of the Indian Navy and his fourth daughter married Reverend Augustus Frederick Bellman, Vicar of Moulton St. Mary.

== See also ==
- O'Byrne, William Richard (1849). "Douglas, Peter John" . A Naval Biographical Dictionary . John Murray – via Wikisource.
