= Thomas Jackson (Royal Navy officer) =

Royal Navy Admiral (1868–1945)

Admiral Sir Thomas Jackson KBE CB MVO
- Born: 20 February 1868; Stoke Damerel, Devon, England
- Died: 7 July 1945 (aged 77); London, England
- Military career
- Allegiance: United Kingdom
- Branch: Royal Navy
- Rank: Admiral
- Commands: HMS Thunderer (1911)
- Conflicts: World War I
- Awards: Knight Commander of the Order of the British Empire; Companion of the Order of the Bath; Member of the Royal Victorian Order

Admiral Sir Thomas Jackson, KBE, CB, MVO (20 February 1868 – 7 July 1945) was a senior Royal Navy officer during World War I.

== Naval career ==
Born the son of Admiral Sir Thomas Sturges Jackson, Jackson joined the Royal Navy in 1881. He was promoted to commander on 31 December 1899, and in early 1900 was posted in lieu of a lieutenant to the pre-dreadnought battleship HMS Revenge, stationed in the Fleet Reserve at Chatham Dockyard.

He was appointed in command of the sloop HMS Rosario on 16 March 1903, serving with her on the China station until the end of 1904.

During the Russo-Japanese War, Jackson was a military observer stationed on the Imperial Japanese Navy cruiser Azuma, and was present at the Battle of Tsushima. After the war, he was promoted captain in 1905, and remained as a military attaché in Tokyo in 1906.

In 1913 he became the Director of the Intelligence Division of the Admiralty War Staff and then served in World War I becoming Director of the Operations Division in January 1915. He played a key role in the Battle of Jutland in May 1916, providing Admiral Jellicoe with incorrect information that the German High Seas Fleet appeared to have remained in harbour. Promoted to rear admiral in June 1916, he was made Flag Officer, Egypt & The Red Sea in July 1917. He was promoted to vice admiral in March 1920. He retired in 1923 and was promoted admiral on the retired list in 1925.

== Family ==
In 1907 he married Mona Anna Murray.

== Sources ==
- Burt, R. A. (2013). British Battleships 1889–1904. Annapolis, Maryland: Naval Institute Press. ISBN 978-1-59114-065-8.
- Kowner, Rotem (2006). Historical Dictionary of the Russo-Japanese War. The Scarecrow Press. ISBN 0-8108-4927-5.

Military offices
Preceded by Alexander Bethell	Director of Naval Intelligence; 1912–1913	Succeeded by Henry Oliver
