= HMS Raposa =

Brig of the Royal Navy

History

Spain
- Name: Raposa
- Namesake: Vixen (in Spanish)
- Launched: 1804
- Captured: 7 January 1806

United Kingdom
- Name: HMS Raposa
- Builder: Spanish
- Acquired: 7 January 1806, by capture
- Fate: Grounded 15 February 1808 and scuttled by her crew

General characteristics
- Tons burthen: 173 (bm)
- Sail plan: Brig
- Complement: 55
- Armament: 12 guns

HMS Raposa was the Spanish brig Raposa, launched in 1804. A cutting out expedition in 1806 by boats from HMS Franchise in the western Caribbean captured her. The Royal Navy subsequently took her into service under her existing name. Raposa served in the Caribbean, repeatedly recapturing merchant ships that had fallen victim to French privateers. Thirteen months after being captured she ran aground while pursuing enemy ships. When they were unable to refloat Raposa, her crew set fire to her to avoid her capture, destroying her.

== British service ==
=== Capture ===
In January 1806 Captain Charles Dashwood of HMS Franchise received information that several Spanish vessels had anchored in the Bay of Campeche and he determined to try to cut them out. On the night of 6 January Franchise arrived some five leagues off the town of Campeche and Dashwood had her anchor in four fathoms as the water was too shallow to come any closer. He then sent in three of Franchise's boats under the command of Lieutenants John Fleming and Peter Douglas, his first and third lieutenants, and Lieutenant Mends of the Marines.

Because of the distance they had to row, the British were unable to approach closely until 4am, by which time the moon had risen, they had been spotted, and the Spaniards alerted. The Spanish vessels consisted of two naval brigs, one of 20 guns and 180 men, and another of 12 guns and 90 men, a schooner armed with eight guns, and seven gunboats, each armed with two guns. They opened fire on the approaching row boats and might have destroyed the attack had Lieutenant Fleming not led his three boats to the smaller of the brigs and boarded her. After about ten minutes of hand-to-hand fighting, the British captured her and were sailing her out, pursued by the other Spanish vessels, which continued to fire on them. The British returned fire from their prize and their boats and the Spanish vessels withdrew.

The captured vessel turned out to be the brig Raposa, pierced for 16 guns but mounting only 12, and also carrying some coehorns, swivel guns, and small arms. She had a crew of 90 men, but her captain, Don Joaquin de la Cheva and most of his officers were ashore, with the result that there were only 75 men on aboard. The Spanish suffered five men killed, not including some who drowned when they jumped overboard, and the senior officer on board and 25 men wounded, many mortally. The British had only seven men wounded. Dashwood sent all the Spanish wounded and prisoners ashore under a flag of truce as they could receive better care ashore.

=== British service ===
The British took the corvette into service under her existing name, commissioning her at Jamaica under Lieutenant Colin Campbell. In June Lloyd's List reported that Raposa had detained Union, Smart, master, as she was sailing from New York to St Domingo. On 27 May 1807 two French privateers captured Eliza, Grantham, master, off Heneagn as Eliza was sailing from Jamaica to Dublin. The next day a French privateer captured Valentine, Nicholson, master, off Cuba as Valentine was sailing from Jamaica to Liverpool. Raposa recaptured Eliza and Valentine and sent them into Jamaica.

In August, Rapsoa was at Port Royal, Jamaica, having delivered a letter and some enclosures from General Francisco de Miranda, the Venezuelan revolutionary. Campbell's replacement was Lieutenant James Violet (or Violett) On 15 December, a French privateer captured Lady Nugent, Staples, master, as Lady Nugent was sailing from Port Antonio to Morant Bay, Jamaica. Raposa recaptured Lady Nugent the same day.

=== Grounded and burnt ===
On 14 February 1808, Raposa was cruising in the Caribbean Sea some 50 nautical miles (93 km; 58 mi) west of Cartagena, New Granada, when she sighted a schooner and three sloops. Spanish records state that these were Volador and three gunboats (cañoneras), all under the command of Teniente de fragata Antonio Gastón de Iriarte y Navarrete.

Raposa chased them to an island where they anchored and formed a line abreast. As Raposa sailed towards them she hit a sandbank. Seeing that she was aground, the enemy vessels came towards her in the late afternoon, and at dusk took up position in line abreast ahead of her. During the night Raposa's crew endeavoured to lighten her, but were unable to free her. At five in the morning Violett surrendered, but not before he and the crew were able to set fire to Raposa and take to her boats. The enemy ships then took all 55 men prisoner.

The subsequent court martial of Violett, his officers, and crew, took place on 11 April aboard HMS Arethusa at Port Royal. The court martial honourably acquitted them all, and praised Lieutenant Violet's gallant conduct. It presented him his sword "with a very handsome eulogium."
