= Augustus Phillimore =

Royal Navy Admiral (1822–1897)

Admiral Sir Augustus Phillimore KCB FRGS
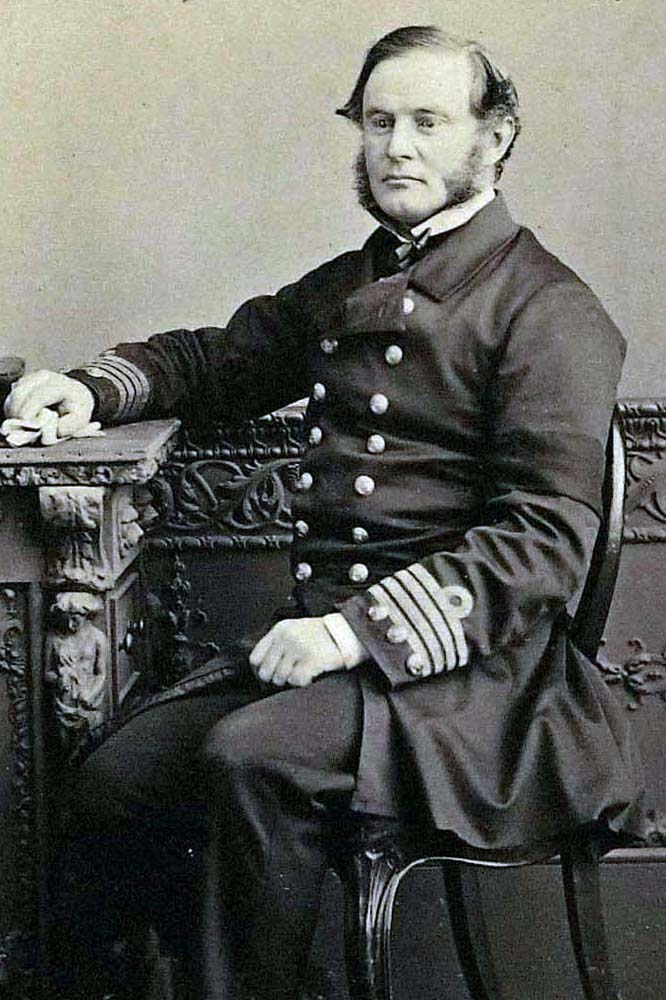
- Captain Phillimore
- Born: 24 May 1822; Whitehall, London, England
- Died: 25 November 1897 (aged 75); Botley, Hampshire
- Military career
- Allegiance: United Kingdom
- Branch: Royal Navy
- Service years: 1835–1887
- Rank: Admiral
- Commands: HMS Medea; HMS Curacoa; HMS Defence; Plymouth Command
- Conflicts: Carlist Wars; First Opium War
- Awards: Knight Commander of the Order of the Bath

Admiral Sir Augustus Phillimore KCB FRGS (24 May 1822 – 25 November 1897) was a Royal Navy officer who served as Commander-in-Chief, Plymouth. He is credited with first proposing the creation of a modern naval dockyard in Gibraltar.

== Early life ==
Phillimore was born on 24 May 1822 at Whitehall in Westminster, London the son of Joseph Phillimore later a professor of civil law at Oxford and his wife Elizabeth. He was educated at Westminster before joining the Royal Navy College at Portsmouth.

== Naval career ==
Phillimore joined the Royal Navy in 1835. He served in the Carlist Wars and in the First Opium War. Promoted Commander in 1852, he was given command of HMS Medea in 1853 and, promoted Captain in 1855, he commanded HMS Curacoa and then HMS Defence.

He was appointed Senior officer Jamaica Division in 1868 and in charge of Jamaica Dockyard. Then Senior officer at Gibraltar in 1869 when he would have stayed in The Mount (Gibraltar). In 1871 he made the proposal that a new naval dockyard should be constructed in Gibraltar. Phillimore's scheme lied dormant in the Admiralty for 22 years before it was put to Parliament in 1895. The idea was to take five years and just under £1.5m pounds. In 1896 the scheme was further extended with the creation of new moles and three dry docks and a new budget of £4.5m pounds. The transformation was large and the government were still passing enabling legislation in 1905. Today the docks are known as Gibdock.

Phillimore became Second-in-command of the Channel Squadron in January 1876 and Superintendent of the Royal Naval Reserve in November 1876. Promoted Admiral in October 1884, he was made Commander-in-Chief, Plymouth in December 1884. He retired in 1887.

He died at his home at Shedfield House near Botley, Hampshire on 25 November 1897.

== Family ==
In 1864 he married Harriet Eleanor Fortescue, daughter of George Fortescue MP; they had six sons and one daughter:

- Adm. Sir Richard Fortescue Phillimore (1864–1940), Royal Navy Officer
- George Grenville Phillimore (1867–1925), barrister and legal scholar
- Violet Elizabeth Annie Phillimore (1869–1960), married John Willis Fleming
- Charles Augustus Phillimore (1871–1949), civil servant
- John Swinnerton Phillimore (1873–1926), classical scholar and poet
- Capt. Valentine Egerton Bagot Phillimore (1875–1945), Royal Navy Officer
- Rev. Edward Granville Phillimore (1876–1959), Vicar of St Mary's Church, Dorchester

== See also ==
- O'Byrne, William Richard (1849). "Phillimore, Augustus" . A Naval Biographical Dictionary . John Murray – via Wikisource.

Military offices
Preceded by Sir William Stewart	Commander-in-Chief, Plymouth; 1884–1887	Succeeded by Lord John Hay
