= Edward H. M. Davis =

Royal Navy Admiral (1846–1929)

Admiral Edward H. M. Davis CMG OBE JP
- Born: August 18, 1846; Galway
- Died: October 6, 1929 (aged 83)
- Military career
- Allegiance: United Kingdom
- Branch: Royal Navy
- Rank: Admiral
- Commands: HMS Daring; HMS Medusa; HMS Colossus; HMS Royalist; HMS Royal Sovereign; HMS Trafalgar; HMS Howe; Commodore-in-Charge, Jamaica Division

Edward Henry Meggs Davis (18 August 1846, in Galway – 6 October 1929) was a Royal Navy captain, then admiral, who served in the Cape of Good Hope Station, Pacific Station, Mediterranean Fleet and the Jamaica Division.

== Life and career ==
He served in the Naval Brigade at the Bombardment of Kagoshima, Japan, from 15 to 17 August 1863, which was part of the Shimonoseki campaign (1863–64), and at the storming of the stockade at Shimonoseki in September 1864.

Davis was promoted to the rank of Lieutenant in 1870. In 1877-78, he served in the Cape Colony with the Naval Brigade in the ninth and final frontier war against the Xhosa armies, In 1878, he was promoted to the rank of Commander, for his services. He also served in the Naval Brigade in the Anglo-Zulu War in 1879.

Davis was promoted to the rank of Captain in 1887 and was given command of HMS Royalist. In September 1891 the Royalist was sent to punish a village of the Kalikoqu tribe in the Roviana Lagoon, on the southern side of New Georgia in the Solomon Islands, following a murder of a trader; the sailors shot some of the men who were believed to be the leaders, set fire to the village and destroyed canoes.

The Royalist conducted a survey in 1891–92, visiting: New Hebrides and New Caledonia (10 December 1889 to 18 June 1891); Territory of Papua and British Solomon Islands (18 June 1891 to 9 April 1892); and Gilbert Islands, Marshall Islands and Ellice Islands (14 April 1892 to 30 August 1892).

On 27 May 1892, Captain Davis proclaimed the Gilbert Islands to be a British Protectorate. Captain Davis reported that in the Ellice Islands, requests were made to him to hoist the British flag on the islands, however he did not have any orders regarding such a formal act.

In the 1894 New Year Honours, he received the C.M.G. "for services connected with certain islands in the Western Pacific."

He was appointed in command of HMS Royal Sovereign in 1897, and was assigned to the Mediterranean Fleet. He was appointed in command of HMS Howe in 1898, which was a port guardship at Queenstown (Cobh), Ireland. He was the Commodore on Jamaica Division from February 1900 to May 1901.

He promoted to the rank of Vice-Admiral on 8 June 1905, then at his request he retired later that month. In 1908, he advanced to the rank of Admiral on the Retired List.

== Sources ==
- "Admiral E. H. M. Davis" (Obituaries). The Times. Monday, 7 October 1929. Issue 45327, col B, p. 16.
- The Dreadnought Project article
