= HMS Retribution =

Four ships of the Royal Navy have borne the name HMS Retribution:

- HMS Retribution was a 32-gun fifth rate launched in 1782 as HMS Hermione. Her crew mutinied and handed her over to the Spanish in 1797. After her capture in 1799 she was renamed HMS Retaliation, and then HMS Retribution in 1800. She was broken up in 1805.
- HMS Retribution was a convict hulk launched in 1799 as the 74-gun third rate HMS Edgar. Edgar was converted into a convict hulk in 1813, renamed HMS Retribution in 1814 and broken up in 1835.
- HMS Retribution (1844) was a wooden paddle frigate built as HMS Watt, but renamed HMS Retribution before her launch in 1844. She was sold in 1864.
- HMS Retribution (1891) was an Apollo-class protected cruiser launched in 1891 and sold in 1911.
