= Henry Kellett =

Royal Navy admiral (1806–1875)

Vice-Admiral Sir Henry Kellett KCB
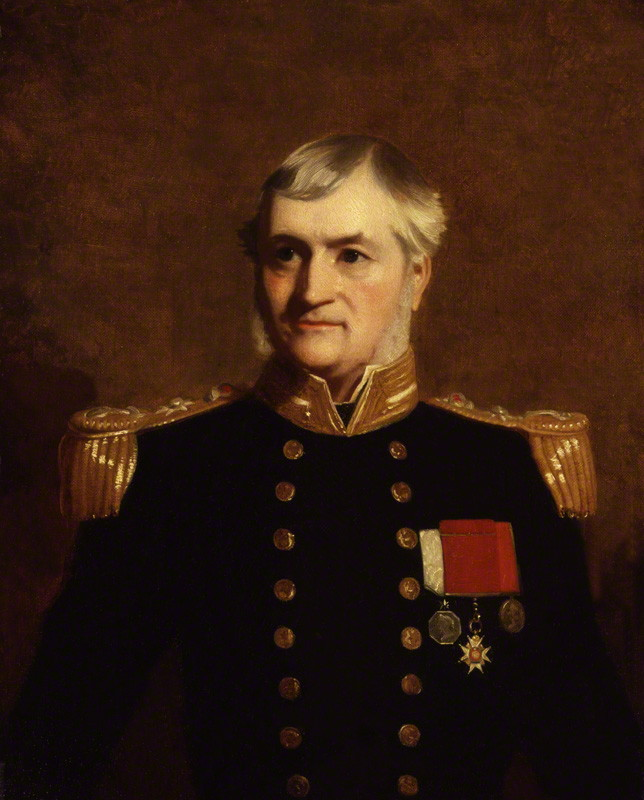
- Sir Henry Kellett
- Born: 2 November 1806; Clonacody, County Tipperary, Ireland
- Died: 1 March 1875 (aged 68); Clonacody, County Tipperary, Ireland
- Military career
- Allegiance: United Kingdom
- Branch: Royal Navy
- Service years: 1822–1871
- Rank: Vice-Admiral
- Commands: China Station; Jamaica Division; HMS Resolute; HMS Herald; HMS Starling
- Conflicts: First Opium War
- Awards: Knight Commander of the Order of the Bath

Vice-Admiral Sir Henry Kellett, KCB (2 November 1806 – 1 March 1875) was an Irish naval officer and explorer.

== Career ==
Born at Clonacody in County Tipperary, Ireland, on 2 November 1806, Kellett joined the Royal Navy in 1822. He spent three years in the West Indies and then served on survey vessels under William Fitzwilliam Owen in Africa, as second-in-command of HMS Sulphur under Edward Belcher in the East Indies, and as captain of HMS Starling in the First Opium War with China during which he was promoted to commander in 1841 and post-captain in 1842.

Admiralty Chart of the Strait of Juan de Fuca, surveyed by Kellett in 1847

In 1845, Kellett was appointed captain of the survey ship HMS Herald as part of a hydrography survey mission, the primary objective of which was to survey the coast of the Americas from Guayaquil to Vancouver, including the Galápagos Islands. He was temporarily reassigned in 1848 to join the search for Sir John Franklin. During this voyage he sailed through the Bering Strait across the Chukchi Sea and discovered Herald Island. Kellett landed on Herald Island and named it after his ship. He also sighted Wrangel Island in the western horizon. William Pullen was on this expedition.

Flag flown by Kellett on his sledge Erin during the 1852–1854 search for Franklin's expedition

In 1852, he commanded HMS Resolute and went to the aid of Robert McClure, whose vessel, Investigator, was trapped in the Arctic. His men constructed a storehouse on Dealy Island off the south coast of Melville Island.

Kellett became Senior Officer in the West Indies in 1855 and superintended the Jamaica Dockyard. He served as Admiral Superintendent of the Malta Dockyard in 1864 and Commander-in-Chief, China Station in 1869. Kellett retired in 1871. His final years were spent at Clonacody, where he died on 1 March 1875.

== Legacy ==
Several places in Hong Kong have been named after him: Kellett Island, Kellett Bay and Mount Kellett. Kellett Bluff on Henry Island, Washington, USA, was probably named after Captain Kellett as well. It is a place with extreme currents, views, and is frequented by feeding orcas. Kellet's whelk Kelletia kelletii is named after him. On Bank's Island in the Canadian Arctic, Cape Kellett and the Kellett River are named after him.

Military offices
Preceded by Horatio Austin	Admiral Superintendent, Malta Dockyard; 1864–1868	Succeeded by Edward Fanshawe
Preceded by Sir Henry Keppel	Commander-in-Chief, China Station; 1869–1871	Succeeded by Sir Charles Shadwell
