= HMS Cleopatra =

Several ships of the Royal Navy have been named HMS Cleopatra, after the Egyptian Queen Cleopatra:

- HMS Cleopatra (1779) was a 32-gun fifth rate, built in 1779 and broken up in 1814. The French captured her in 1805 and she spent several days in their hands before being recaptured.
- HMS Cleopatra (1835) was a 26-gun sixth rate built in 1835 and broken up in 1862.
- HMS Cleopatra (1878) was a Comus-class screw corvette built in 1878, and used for harbour service from 1905. She was renamed Defiance III in 1922 and sold for breaking up in 1931.
- HMS Cleopatra (1915) was a C-class light cruiser built in 1915 and broken up in 1931.
- HMS Cleopatra (33) was a Dido-class cruiser built in 1940 and broken up in 1958.
- HMS Cleopatra (F28) was a Leander-class frigate launched in 1964 and sold for scrap in 1993.

The name can also refer to Cleopatra (1839), an East India Company paddle frigate built in 1839 and sunk by a tropical cyclone in the Indian Ocean in 1847.
