= Thomas Sturges Jackson =

Royal Navy Admiral (1842–1934)

Admiral Sir Thomas Sturges Jackson KCVO
- Born: 6 March 1842
- Died: 9 September 1934 (aged 92)
- Military career
- Allegiance: United Kingdom
- Branch: Royal Navy
- Rank: Admiral
- Commands: Devonport Dockyard
- Awards: Knight Commander of the Royal Victorian Order (KCVO)

Admiral Sir Thomas Sturges Jackson, KCVO (6 March 1842 – 9 September 1934) was a Royal Navy officer who was Admiral-Superintendent of Devonport Dockyard.

== Naval career ==
Jackson entered the Royal Navy in 1856, and served in the Second Opium War in China, where he was present at the capture of Canton in 1857, and the capture of Peiho Forts in 1858, for which he received the China medal, with Canton and Taku clasps. He was promoted to commander on 1 November 1873, and captain on 14 October 1881. He was naval officer in charge in Jamaica 1892–1895, and was promoted to flag rank as a rear admiral on 20 October 1896.

Jackson was appointed Admiral-Superintendent of HM Dockyard Devonport on 7 July 1899, and served as such until 11 July 1902. During these years he hoisted his flag on several ship. He transferred his flag to HMS Indus on 11 April 1900. He was promoted to Vice admiral on 24 January 1902, and knighted as a Knight Commander of the Royal Victorian Order (KCVO) on 8 March 1902, during a visit of King Edward VII and Queen Alexandra to Devonport and the dockyard.

He was promoted to admiral on 5 July 1905, and placed on the retired list at his own request later the same month.

== Personal life ==
Jackson was born in 1842 in Stepney, London, to the Rev. Thomas Jackson and Elizabeth Fiske. He married first, in 1867, Helen Gordon, daughter of C. A. Gordon, of Lahore. She died in 1884, and he remarried, in 1892, Marian Crane, daughter of Hon. W. H. Crane, of Sackville, New Brunswick. Lady Jackson was godmother to HMS Encounter, launched and christened at Devonport Dockyard on 18 June 1902. She died in 1920. He had a total of three sons and six daughters with his two wives, including Vice-Admiral Sir Thomas Jackson, KBE (1868–1945), and Helen Douglas Jackson (1869–1949), wife of Major-General Clifford Coffin.

Jackson died in September 1934 in Colchester, England.

Military offices
Preceded by Rear-Admiral Henry John Carr	Admiral -Superintendent of Devonport Dockyard; 1899–1902	Succeeded by Vice-Admiral William Hannam Henderson
