= De Horsey =

de Horsey is a British surname and may refer to:

== People ==
- Algernon Frederick Rous de Horsey (1827–1922), Knight and Royal Navy Admiral
- Spencer Horsey de Horsey (1790–1860), Conservative Party politician in the UK

Spencer Horsey de Horsey (1790 – 20 May 1860), known until 1832 as Spencer Horsey Kilderbee, was a British Tory politician. ...

- William Henry Beaumont de Horsey (died 1915), British soldier, son of Spencer Horsey de Horsey and brother of Algernon Frederick Rous de Horsey and Adeline Louisa Marie de Horsey
- Adeline, Countess of Cardigan and Lancastre, born Adeline Louisa Marie de Horsey

== Places ==
- De Horsey Island, British Columbia, named for Admiral de Horsey
  - De Horsey Passage, British Columbia, named for Admiral de Horsey
