= Kshaoom Indian Reserve No. 23 =

Coordinates: 54°08′00″N 130°09′00″W

Kshaoom Indian Reserve No. 23, officially Kshaoom 23, 2.3 hectares in size, is an Indian reserve on the northwest tip of De Horsey Island, which is immediately south of the Tsimpsean Peninsula at the mouth of the Skeena River in the North Coast region of British Columbia, Canada. It and Dashken Indian Reserve No. 22, across De Horsey Passage on the east tip of Smith Island, are shared between the Metlakatla and Lax Kw'alaams band governments.

== See also ==
- List of Indian reserves in British Columbia
