= Edmund Buckley (politician, born 1780) =

British Conservative politician

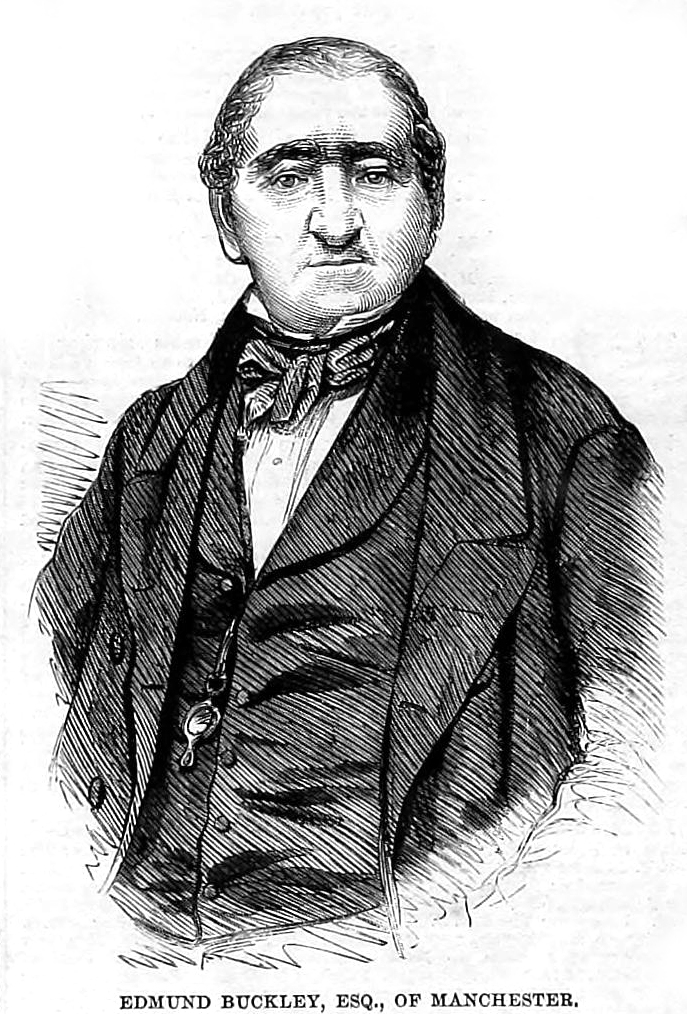
- Sir Edmund Buckley
- Born: Edmund Buckley; 25 December 1780
- Died: 21 January 1867
- Occupation: Industrialist
- Children: 16

Edmund Buckley (24 December 1780 – 21 January 1867) was a British Conservative Party politician. He was a successful industrialist, owning iron works, collieries and cotton mills. He was the Chairman of the Manchester Exchange during the 1850s, resigning that post in 1860.

He was elected at the 1841 general election as a member of parliament (MP) for Newcastle-under-Lyme, and held the seat until the 1847 general election, when he did not stand again.

His illegitimate son Edmund Peck, was born in 1834. Peck later adopted his father's surname and inherited his fortune, and became Sir Edmund Buckley, 1st Baronet.

Parliament of the United Kingdom
Preceded by Spencer de Horsey; William Henry Miller	Member of Parliament for Newcastle-under-Lyme; 1841 – 1847; With: John Quincey Harris 1841–1842; John Campbell Colquhoun 1842–1847	Succeeded by Samuel Christy; William Jackson
