= Marcus Passage =

- Kennedy Gap
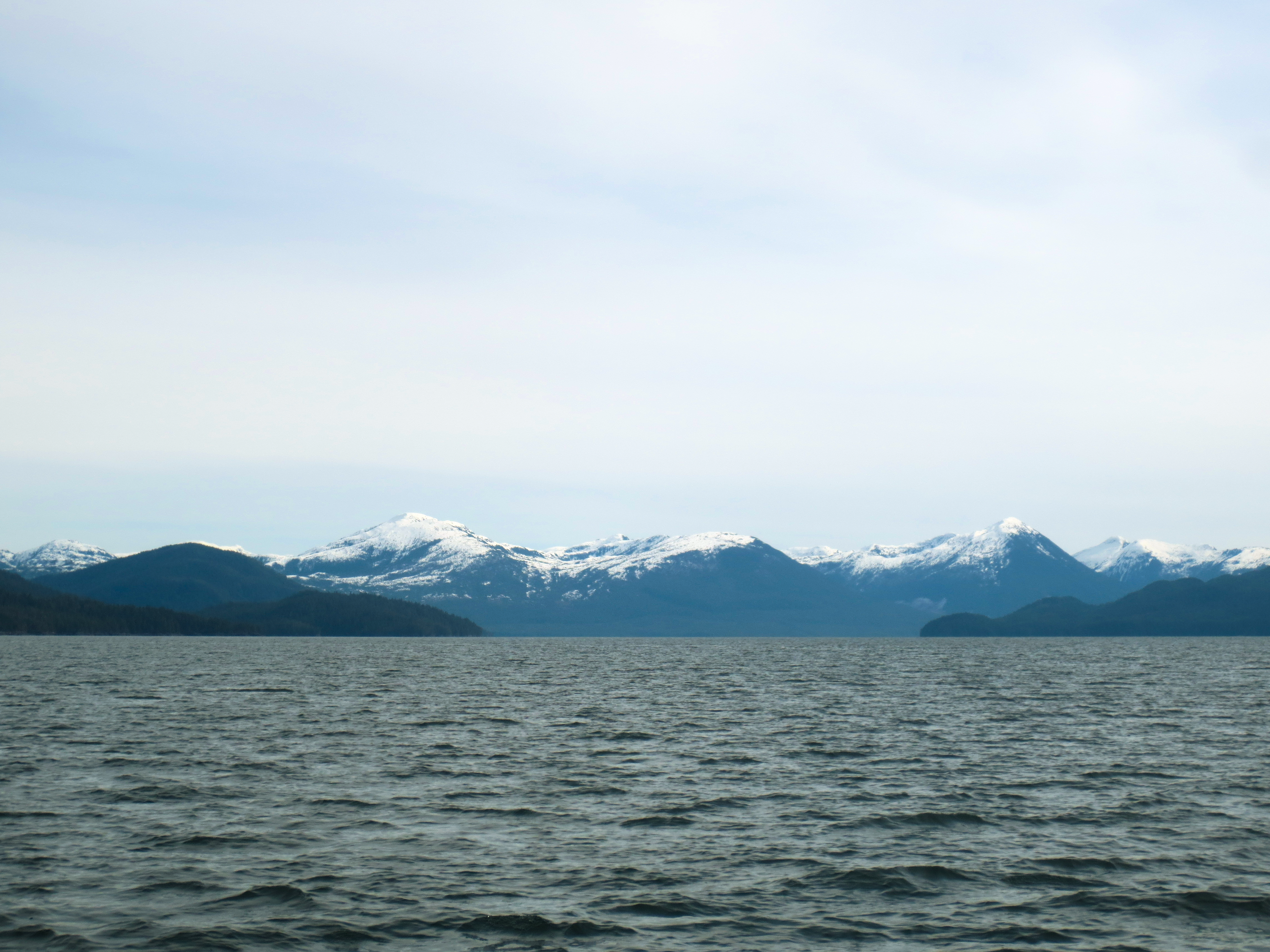
- Looking Southeast across Marcus Passage, Smith Island is to the left, and Kennedy Island is to the right

- Location within British Columbia
- Location: British Columbia, Canada
- Coordinates: 54°06′22″N 130°15′24″W

Marcus Passage is a stretch of saltwater on the North Coast region of British Columbia, Canada, offshore from the mouth of the Skeena River, south and west of Smith Island. Marcus Passage connects Chatham Sound with Telegraph Passage. The south side of Marcus Passage is defined by an extensive drying bank called Base Sand (locally known as Wilson Bar).

== Hydrography ==
The easterly tidal flood attains a rate of 3.5 knots (6.5 km/h; 4.0 mph), and the westerly tidal ebb can stream at up to 5 knots (9.3 km/h; 5.8 mph).

Two shoals obstruct Marcus Passage, the first extends from De Horsey Passage to Base Sand, the second extends from De Horsey Island to Kennedy Island. Sand waves with amplitudes of 1.6 metres (5 ft 3 in) are known on these shoals.

== See also ==
- Inside Passage
- Chatham Sound
- Skeena River
