= HMS Sidon (1846) =

Frigate of the Royal Navy

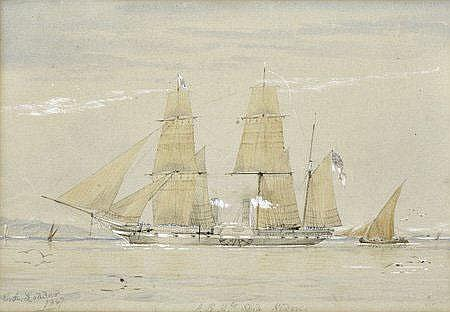
- Watercolour of HMS Sidon

History

United Kingdom
- Name: HMS Sidon
- Builder: Deptford Dockyard, London
- Laid down: 26 May 1845
- Launched: 26 May 1846
- Fate: Sold 15 July 1864

General characteristics
- Tons burthen: 1329 bm
- Length: 211 ft (64 m)
- Beam: 37 ft (11 m)
- Draught: 27 ft (8.2 m)
- Propulsion: Two direct-acting Seaward engines of combined 560 nhp
- Speed: 10 kt (19 km/h)
- Armament: Middle deck: 14 × 8 in (203 mm)/60 hundredweight (3 t) guns; Two x 68 pounder (31 kg)/88 hundredweight (4.5 t) pivots (fore and aft); Quarter deck: Four x 8 in (203 mm)/52 hundredweight (2.6 t) on slides; Fo'c'sle: Two x 8 in (203 mm)/52 hundredweight (2.6 t) on slides.

HMS Sidon was a first-class paddle frigate designed by Sir Charles Napier. Her name commemorated his attack on the port of Sidon in 1840 in the Syrian War. Her keel was laid down on 26 May 1845 at Deptford Dockyard, and she was launched on 26 May 1846. She had a fairly short career for a warship, but it included the rescue of the crew of the sinking P&O ship Ariel on 28 May 1848, and a trip up the Nile that same year, when her passengers included the explorer and botanist Joseph Dalton Hooker.

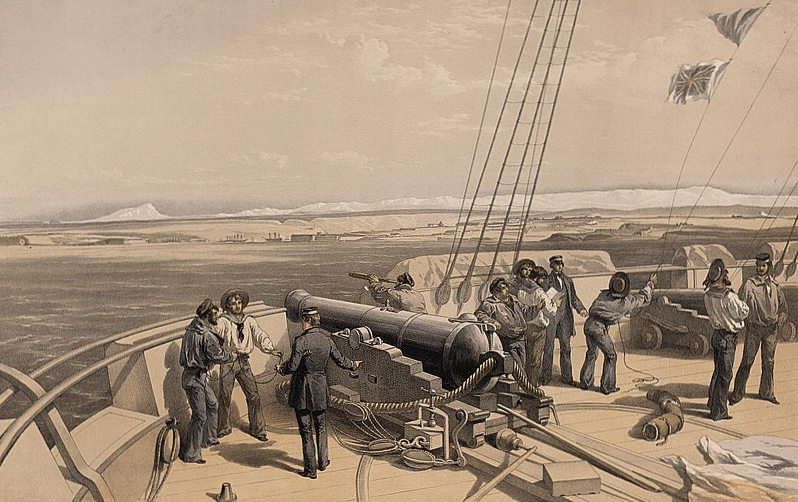
View of Sevastopol from Sidon's deck in 1855 in the Crimean War

Sidon served in the Black Sea in the Crimean War, 1854–55 under the command of Captain George Goldsmith. In April 1854, in company with HMS Firebrand (Captain William Houston Stewart), she blockaded the coast from Kavarna to the mouths of the River Danube. In September, in the Allied invasion of the Crimea, she was assigned to escorting the French troop transports, and assisted the French line-of-battleship Algiers, which had gone aground in Eupatoria Bay. She was then sent to monitor Russian movements around Odessa, and on 4 October attacked a marching column of 12,000 men on their way to the Crimea. On this occasion Russian rocket hit her funnel.

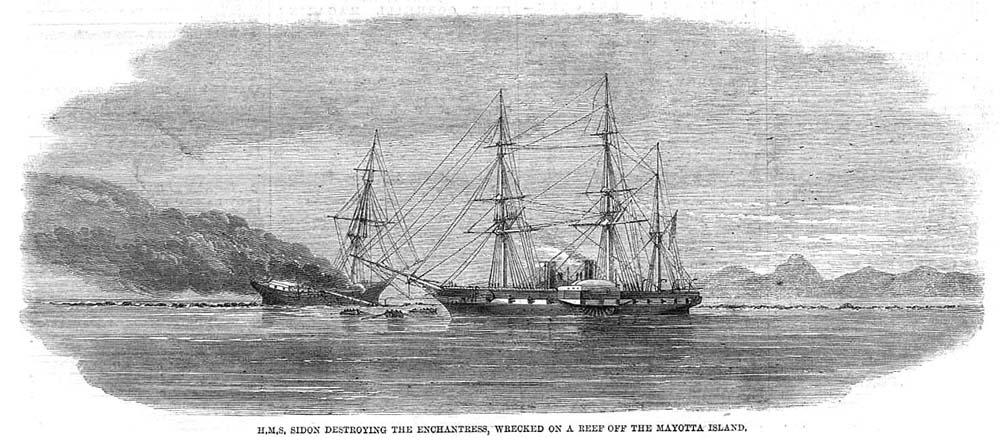
HMS Sidon destroying Enchantress at Mayotte

On 11 June 1860, Sidon ran aground at "Pomong Harbour", Cape Colony. Repairs cost £678. She returned to the east coast of Africa and in 1861 destroyed the Royal Navy tender Enchantress, which had wrecked on 20 February 1861 on a reef off Mayotte in the Mozambique Channel.

== Fate ==
Sidon was sold for breaking up on 15 July 1864 to Castle and Beech.
