= Battle of Pacocha =

1877 battle

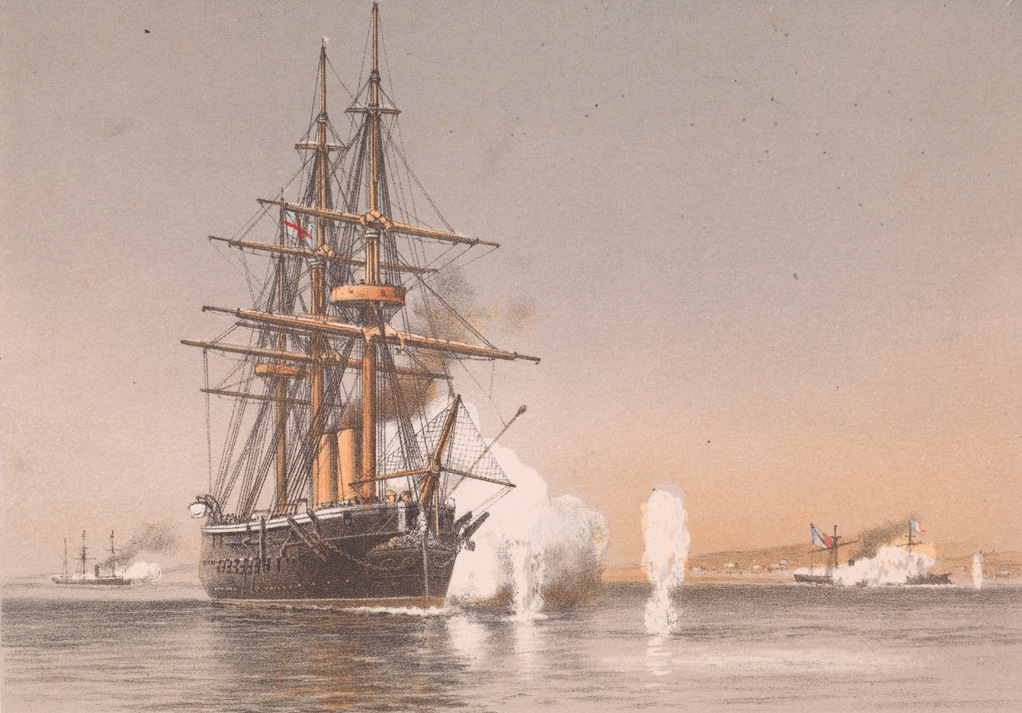
- 1880 engraving of a William Frederick Mitchell painting of the battle
Date	29 May 1877
Location	Off Ylo, Pacific Ocean
Result	Inconclusive

Belligerents
United Kingdom	Peruvian rebels

Commanders and leaders
Algernon de Horsey	Luis Germán Astete

Strength
1 frigate 1 corvette 2 artillery boats	1 monitor

Casualties and losses
Unknown	1 killed

The Battle of Pacocha took place on 29 May 1877 between the rebel-held Peruvian monitor Huáscar and the Royal Navy warships HMS Shah and HMS Amethyst. The vessels did not inflict significant damage on each other, however the battle is notable for seeing the first combat use of the self-propelled torpedo.

== Background ==
In May 1877, Nicolás de Piérola, former Minister of Finance, initiated an attempt to overthrow then-President Mariano Ignacio Prado. As part of this coup attempt, on 6 May two of his supporters, Colonel Lorranaga and Major Echenique, boarded Huáscar at the port of Callao while the captain and executive officer were ashore. Officers remaining on the ship were part of the plot and persuaded the crew to join their cause. Now in rebel hands, Huáscar put to sea with Luis Germán Astete in command. Other Peruvian naval ships present in the port, such as Atahualpa, were in a state of disrepair and unable to pursue.

The rebels used the ship to harass commercial shipping, especially off Callao, the main commercial port of Peru. However, after she forcibly boarded some British merchant ships, British authorities sent HMS Shah and HMS Amethyst, under command of Rear Admiral Algernon de Horsey of Pacific Station, to capture the vessel, with authorization and reward offered by the Peruvian government of Mariano Ignacio Prado.

On May 16, Huáscar appeared in the port of Antofagasta, Bolivia, where it picked up Nicolás de Piérola, as Supreme Chief of Peru, and his entourage of followers.

== Battle ==
Huáscar escaped after a fierce exchange of fire. Her guns were undermanned, and she fired just 40 rounds. Shah's mast was damaged by splinters. On the British side, Shah fired 237 shots and Amethyst 190, but they carried no armour-piercing ammunition. Huáscar was hit 60 times, but her armour shield caused all the shots to bounce off harmlessly. In a last-ditch effort to sink Huáscar, two small torpedo rams from Shah attempted to torpedo her, but Huáscar escaped under the cover of darkness. The rebel crew was forced to surrender their ship to the Peruvian government ships squadron just two days later.

This battle saw the first use of the newly invented self-propelled torpedo, which at the time had just entered limited service with the Royal Navy. The monitor Huáscar evaded the torpedo.
