= Barretto Junior =

Transport barque built in 1818

Barretto Junior was a wood-hulled barque built in Calcutta in 1818 that served as a passenger-cargo ship and expeditionary support vessel as well as a transport for both troops and convicts. She is best known for supplying Franklin's lost expedition.

== History ==
=== Early history ===
Barretto Junior was launched in June 1818 by Michael Smith at Howrah, Calcutta (modern day Kolkata, West Bengal) for R. Ford & Company, and likely named after the Portuguese-descended Joseph Barretto Junior, of wealthy India-based merchants Barretto & Co. She was initially a cargo ship, measured as 485 tons burthen, and later as 523 gross register tons. Licensed to use the facilities of the East India Company and to carry their cargoes, Barretto Junior was recorded at Canton (modern day Guangzhou) in October 1818. In Autumn 1826 she brought an East India company cargo to London, where she was put up for sale at auction in the East India Docks.

In 1829 the ship was bought by Fairlie & Co, London who refitted her in 1831 as a passenger ship for the London-Madras-Calcutta route, which continued until 1838. In 1836 Barretto Junior's registered owner became Reid & Co, but two years later she was bought by a leading British shipowner, Joseph Somes of London. In September 1838 she sailed from Cove of Cork with troops for Cape Town and Mauritius, a prelude to being taken up as an army transport in 1839. After Somes' death in June 1845, Barretto Junior was transferred to J & F Somes, and re-rigged as a barque.

=== Franklin expedition ===
Still owned by Somes, in 1845 Iden Huggins was appointed master of Barretto Junior. Royal Navy lieutenant Edward Griffiths was put in charge of the ship on 18 April 1845, and placed under orders of John Franklin at the Woolwich Dockyard, to help preparation for his expedition to chart the Northwest Passage. Barretto Junior was to carry stores of supplies, provision, and clothing which would be transferred to the expedition ships HMS Erebus and HMS Terror once they had arrived in the arctic. This allowed a larger amount of supplies to be brought on the expedition without overburdening the main vessels, and helped safeguard supplies for the journey across the Atlantic. Barretto Junior also carried live cattle to be slaughtered for fresh meat.

Barretto Junior was accompanied by two steam tugs that helped tow Erebus and Terror to Greenland: HMS Rattler and HMS Blazer. All five ships arrived in Disko Bay on 4 July 1845, and Barretto Junior's stores were transferred to the two expedition ships. On 12 July 1845, she took on all mail from the personnel of the expedition to deliver to England. Among these was a scientific paper entitled "On the Anatomy of Forbesia," written by Harry Duncan Spens Goodsir, which was published posthumously by his brother John Goodsir five years later. Five men of the expedition also returned to England aboard Barretto Junior: William Aitken (marine, Terror), John Brown (able seaman, Terror), Thomas Burt (armourer, Erebus), Robert Carr (armourer, Terror) and James Elliot (sailmaker, Terror).

The ship returned to Deptford, Kent on 11 August 1845 and Griffith reported that Franklin's men were confident and in good health. She briefly reverted to troop transport duties with a round trip to Halifax, Nova Scotia, returning to the Thames on 6 November.

=== Convict transport ===
From December 1845 to 1850, Barretto Junior operated as a convict transport, firstly to Bermuda, as well as delivering naval stores and troops. In 1850 she carried female convicts from England to Van Diemen's Land (from 1856, Tasmania), Australia. Most of the women were young first-time offenders, mostly convicted for theft, and the ship's conditions were dangerous, with prevalent disease, malnourishment, and abuse. On a July 1850 voyage, three women and two children died before reaching land, and the ship was caught in a hurricane off the Cape of Good Hope. One of the women, 23 year old Elizabeth Wilson, committed suicide by jumping overboard and drowning. The 1850 voyage ended this period as a Government transport, and she reverted to commercial trading. Changing hands by 1853 to Hall, Brothers & Co, London, she was sent in June as an emigrant ship to Port Phillip, Colony of Victoria.

=== Final years and loss ===
During the Crimean War, Barretto Junior was again taken up as a cargo transport, loading a cargo of huts at Lowestoft, Suffolk, in 1855 for the British troops and returning to the Thames the following year with stores.

On 10 June 1859, on a voyage from the Tyne to Alicante with 750 tons of coal, she put in to Portsmouth, having developed a leak, but on departure on 25 June gave destination as "Mayotte, Mozambique". When nearing Mayotte on 25 October, she struck a reef and then capsized. Eleven of the eighteen crew died, with the survivors being picked up by HMS Brisk.

== See also ==
- Convict ships to Tasmania
- Personnel of Franklin's lost expedition
- List of shipwrecks in October 1859
