= John Campbell Colquhoun =

Scottish writer and politician

Member of Parliament for Newcastle-under-Lyme
- In office 1842–1847
- Preceded by: John Quincey Harris; Edmund Buckley
- Succeeded by: Samuel Christy-Miller; Sir William Jackson

Member of Parliament for Kilmarnock Burghs
- In office 1837–1841
- Preceded by: John Bowring
- Succeeded by: Alexander Johnston

Member of Parliament for Dunbartonshire
- In office 1832–1835
- Preceded by: Lord Montagu Graham
- Succeeded by: Alexander Dennistoun

Personal details
- Born: 23 January 1803; Edinburgh
- Died: 17 April 1870 (aged 67)
- Spouse: Henrietta Maria
- Parents: Archibald Colquhoun (father); Mary Ann Erskine (mother)

John Campbell Colquhoun (23 January 1803 – 17 April 1870) was a Scottish writer and politician.

== Life ==
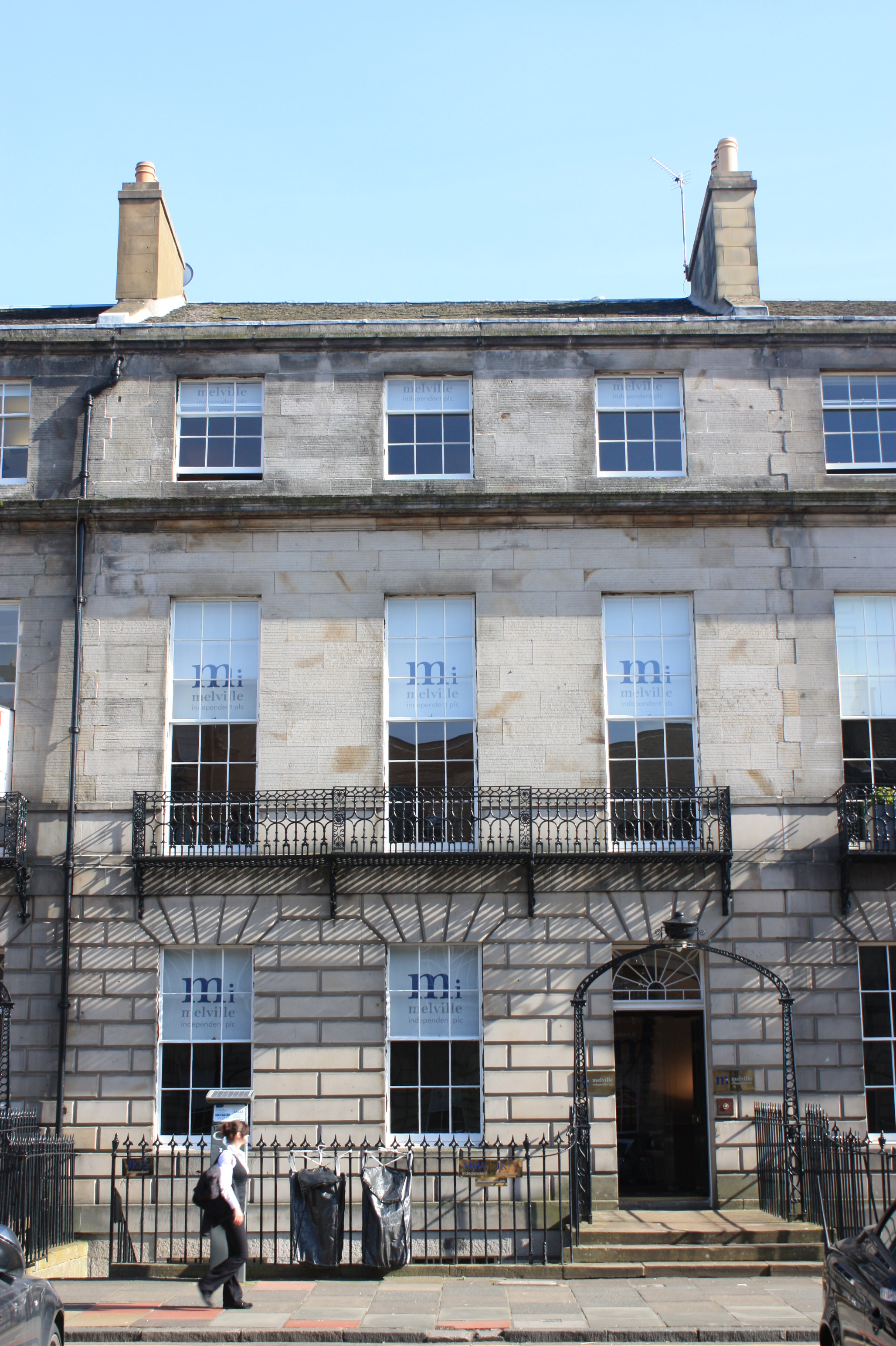
10 Melville Street, Edinburgh

Colquhoun was born in Edinburgh on 23 January 1803, son of Archibald Colquhoun and Mary Ann, daughter of the Rev. William Erskine, episcopalian minister at Muthill, Perthshire. He was educated at Edinburgh High School, and Oriel College, Oxford.

In 1832 Colquhoun is listed as living at 10 Melville Street in the west end of Edinburgh, then newly built. In the same year he was elected Member of Parliament for Dumbartonshire, and in 1837 for Kilmarnock Burghs. He unsuccessfully contested the Kilmarnock burghs in July 1841, however was elected in July 1842 as a member for Newcastle-under-Lyme, which he continued to represent until the dissolution of 1847, when he retired from reasons of health.

A wealthy Conservative and evangelical, Colquhoun served as president of the Glasgow Society. He was chairman of the general committee of the National Club, the Church of England Education Society, and the Irish Church Mission to Roman Catholics.

Disraeli gave a pen-portrait of him (Reminiscences, ed. H.M. and M. Swartz, 1975, pp. 31–2).

Colquhoun died 17 April 1870 and was buried in Dean Cemetery near Edinburgh.

== Works ==
Colquhoun wrote political and religious pamphlets on questions of the day in Scotland and Ireland. He was also the author of:

- Isis Revelata: An Inquiry into the Origin, Progress and Present State of Animal Magnetism, 1836;
- Short Sketches of some Notable Lives, 1855;
- Life in Italy and France in the Olden Time, 1858;
- Scattered Leaves of Biography, 1864;
- William Wilberforce, his Friends and his Times. London: Longmans, Green, Reader, & Dyer. 1866 – via Google Books., 2nd edit. 1867; and
- Memorials of Henrietta Maria Colquhoun, 1870.

== Family ==
In 1827 Colquhoun married Henrietta Maria, daughter of Thomas Powys, 2nd Baron Lilford. They had two sons.

== Notes ==
Attribution

This article incorporates text from a publication now in the public domain: Stephen, Leslie, ed. (1887). "Colquhoun, John Campbell (1803-1870)". Dictionary of National Biography. Vol. 11. London: Smith, Elder & Co.

Parliament of the United Kingdom
Preceded by Lord Montagu Graham	Member of Parliament for Dumbartonshire; 1832 – 1835	Succeeded by Alexander Dennistoun
Preceded by John Bowring	Member of Parliament for Kilmarnock Burghs; 1837 – 1841	Succeeded by Alexander Johnston
Preceded by John Quincey Harris; Edmund Buckley	Member of Parliament for Newcastle-under-Lyme; 1842 – 1847; With: Edmund Buckley	Succeeded by Samuel Christy-Miller; William Jackson
