= Oceanic, British Columbia =

Coordinates: 54°07′00″N 130°13′00″W

Oceanic is an unincorporated settlement at the southern tip of Smith Island in the area of the Skeena estuary on the North Coast of British Columbia, Canada.

== See also ==
- List of settlements in British Columbia
