= Chatham Sound =

Sound on the coast of British Columbia, Canada

- French: Bassin de Chatham
- Looking Northeasterly across Chatham Sound

- Location within British Columbia
- Location: British Columbia, Canada, between Dundas Islands, Stephens Islands and Tsimpsean Peninsula
- Coordinates: 54°22′30″N 130°35′30″W
- Primary inflows: Nass River, Skeena River
- Primary outflows: Dixon Entrance, Hecate Strait
- Max. length: 70 kilometres (43 mi)
- Max. width: 15–25 kilometres (9.3–15.5 mi)
- Surface area: 1,600 square kilometres (600 mi^{2})

Chatham Sound is a sound on the North Coast of British Columbia, Canada, bordering on Alaska, United States. It is an ecologically and economically important semi-enclosed basin located between the Dundas and Stephens Islands and the Tsimpsean Peninsula,

The sound is part of the Inside Passage and extends from Portland Inlet in the north to Porcher Island in the south. It can be divided into two parts, by a line drawn between Tugwell and Melville Islands. The northern part, is influenced by the Nass River outflows and village of Lax Kw'alaams, and the southern part influenced by the Skeena River outflows and the city of Prince Rupert.

It may have been named in 1788 by British Captain Charles Duncan after John Pitt, 2nd Earl of Chatham, who was First Lord of the Admiralty at that time.

Tsimshian have relied on Chatham Sound for millennia, and the continued use and health of its resources remain central to their cultural and economic vitality.

== Geography ==
Chatham Sound is a semi-enclosed basin with an area of about 1,600 square kilometres (600 mi^{2}). It is connected to the open waters of the Hecate Strait and Dixon Entrance via several channels, such as Main, Brown, Hudson Bay, and Edye Passages. Along its southern end, the sound provides access to inland passages such as the Marcus and Arthur Passages, and the Grenville Channel beyond that.

The two major rivers that drain into the sound are the Nass River (via the Portland Inlet) and Skeena River (via the Inverness and Marcus Passages). Because of the large inflow of fresh water the salinity of the sound is lower than the adjacent ocean.

== Hydrography ==
Chatham Sound contains many rocks, reefs, and shoals, and is mostly under 100 fathoms (600 ft; 180 m) deep, except in the northern part of the sound where depth exceeds 300 fathoms (1,800 ft; 550 m). The sound is characterized by lower salinity near-surface waters on its eastern side, transitioning to higher salinity near-surface waters on the western side.

Chatham Sound is an area of very large tides, with tidal ranges reaching peak values of 7.7 metres (25 ft) and an average tidal range of 4.9 metres (16 ft). Currents are proportionately strong, and highly variable due to a combination of large tidal ranges, seasonally strong winds, and large peak freshwater discharges from the Skeena and Nass Rivers. Tidal streams in the sound rarely exceed 4 km/h (2.5 mph), with lower speeds in the north between Dundas Island and the northern extent of Tsimpsean Peninsula.

Surface circulation is dominated by a strongly seasonal freshwater current, which flows into the southeast from three channels: approximately 75% of the Skeena River flows equally through Marcus Passage and Telegraph Passage, while the remaining 25% of the Skeena River flows through Inverness Passage.

An underwater fiber-optic cable extends westward from Ridley Island, then proceeds north along Chatham Sound to Dixon Entrance, before continuing northwest across Dixon Entrance into United States territorial waters.

== Ecology ==
As a result of tidal mixing, Chatham Sound is an area of particularly high primary productivity and highly concentrated phytoplankton biomass. The sound has the largest diversity of shrimp species in the Pacific North Coast Integrated Management Area, with numbers dominated by humpback shrimp. There are also major aggregations of Dungeness crab in the area.

Once thought to be extinct, sponge reefs are now known to be a significant component of the sound floor. The largest cluster is now designated the Chatham Sound Reef Complex.

The sound is part of the Pacific Flyway migration route, providing important habitats for geese, sea ducks, raptors, and crows.

The majority of shoreline has a NOAA Environmental Sensitivity Index in the high to very high range, which includes the southern intertidal flats. The NOAA Oil Residence Index indicates that 75% of the shoreline has a high oil residence time of months to years.

== See also ==
- Chatham Strait - nearby strait in the Alaska Panhandle, named after the William Pitt, 1st Earl of Chatham
