= 1842 Newcastle-under-Lyme by-election =

UK parliamentary by-election

The 1842 Newcastle-under-Lyme by-election of 14 June 1842 was caused by the voiding of the election in 1841 of the Liberal John Quincey Harris, on the grounds of bribery by his agents. Harris, who had not been proved personally cognisant of the bribery, offered himself for reelection against the Conservative candidate John Campbell Colquhoun. The Conservatives publicly proclaimed before the poll their case that Harris was to be barred from re-standing.

== Result ==
Newcastle-under-Lyme by-election, 1842
| Party | Candidate | Votes | % | ±% |
|---|---|---|---|---|
| Whig | John Quincey Harris | 499 | 51.0 | +17.8 |
| Conservative | John Campbell Colquhoun | 479 | 49.0 | −17.8 |
| Majority | | 20 | 2.0 | −6.7 |
| Turnout | | 978 | 91.0 | −3.1 |
| Whig hold | | Swing | +17.8 | |

A further Election Committee convened on 21 July 1842 to consider a petition that Harris was disqualified from re-standing in a by-election caused by the voiding of his own election, that this was notorious before the by-election, that votes cast for Harris were thrown away, and that Colquhoun should be declared elected. The Committee agreed, and Colquhoun was seated.
