= William Henry Miller (book collector) =

Scottish book collector and member of parliament

Member of Parliament for Newcastle-under-Lyme
- In office 1830–1841

Personal details
- Born: 1789 Craigentinny, Midlothian, Scotland
- Died: 1848 (aged 58–59) Craigentinny, Midlothian, Scotland

William Henry Miller (1789 – 31 October 1848) was a Scottish book collector and parliamentarian. He sat in the House of Commons from 1830 to 1837.

== Early life ==
Miller, the only child of William Miller of Craigentinny, Midlothian, was born in 1789. He received a liberal education, and throughout life retained a taste for classical literature.

== Career ==
At the 1830 general election he entered Parliament as a Whig defeating Evelyn Denison (who was later Speaker) to become one of the two Members for the borough of Newcastle-under-Lyme. He was re-elected in 1831 as a Tory, and in 1832, 1835 and 1837, each time after a contest, and on two occasions at the head of the poll. In 1841, however, he was defeated, and he was again unsuccessful as a candidate for Berwick at the general election of 1847.

== Death ==
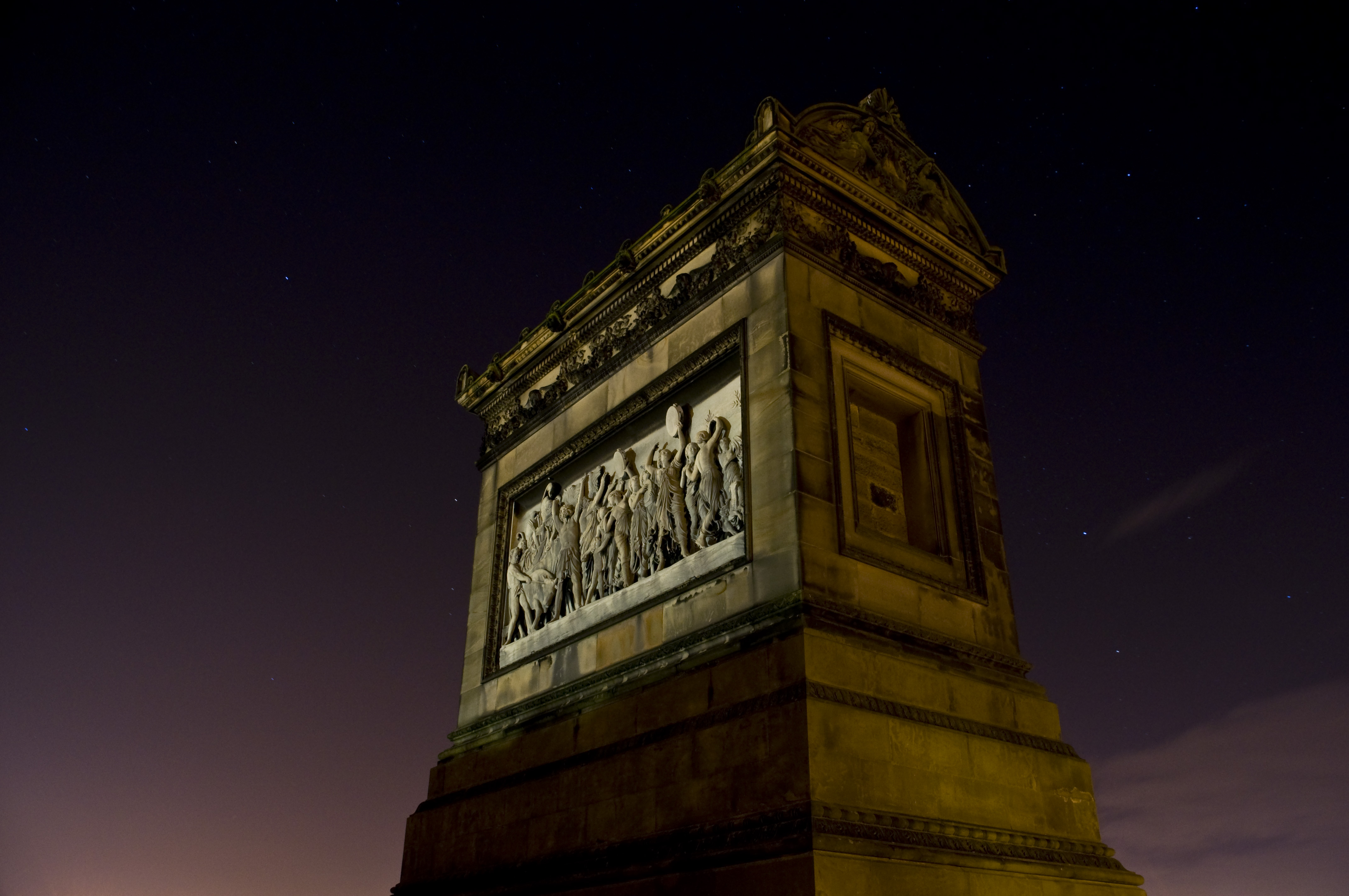
The Craigentinny Marbles

He died, unmarried, at Craigentinny House, near Edinburgh, on 31 October 1848, aged 60. According to his wishes, Miller was buried on his estate in a mausoleum built after his death, and decorated with sculptured friezes by Alfred Gatley, subsequently referred to as the Craigentinny Marbles.

A portrait of William Henry Miller, by painter Sir Thomas Lawrence, was engraved.

== Britwell Court Library ==
As a book collector, Miller was regarded as the successor of Richard Heber, and many of the rarest works from his collections of the latter passed into the library which he formed at Britwell Court, near Burnham, Buckinghamshire. He was particular in his choice of copies, and from his habit of carrying about with him a foot rule to measure the size of a 'tall' copy of a book which he wished to buy, he became known at sales and among collectors as 'Measure Miller.’

The Britwell Library, formed chiefly at the time of the dispersal of the Heber and other important collections, and then added to by acquisitions from Thomas Corser, Laing, and other sales, was unrivalled among private libraries for the number, rarity, and condition of its examples of early English and Scottish literature. It contained six works from William Caxton's press, many printed by Wynkyn de Worde and Richard Pynson, and the greater part of the Heber collection of ballads and broadsides. It was especially rich in early English poetry, and possesses also the finest and most complete series in existence of Theodor de Bry's collections of voyages to the East and West Indies. Britwell Court and its libraries were bequeathed by Miller to his cousin Miss Marsh, from whom they passed to Samuel Christy-Miller, M.P. for Newcastle-under-Lyme from 1847 to 1859, and on his death, on 5 April, to Wakefield Christie-Miller (d.1898), whose sons inherited them.

The Library had a crest showing a right hand holding an open book. The collection of rare books was housed in a library built in 1864 which, with the provision of steel doors and mains water hydrants, was intended to be fire-proof. The house and library collection stayed within the family until 1919, at which point the house and the collection were sold, and the collection split up.

Parliament of the United Kingdom
Preceded by Richardson Borradaile; Robert John Wilmot	Member of Parliament for Newcastle-under-Lyme; 1830–1841; With: Richardson Borradaile 1826–1831; Edmund Peel 1831–1832; Sir Henry Willoughby 1832–1835; Edmund Peel 1835–1837; Spencer de Horsey from 1837	Succeeded by John Quincey Harris; John Campbell Colquhoun
