= Algernon de Horsey =

Royal Navy Admiral (1827–1922)

Admiral Sir Algernon de Horsey KCB DL
- Born: 25 July 1827
- Died: 22 October 1922 (aged 95)
- Military career
- Allegiance: United Kingdom
- Branch: Royal Navy
- Service years: 1840–1892
- Rank: Admiral
- Commands: HMS Devastation; HMS Victor; HMS Brisk; HMS Wolverine; HMS Aurora; HMS Hector; Pacific Station
- Awards: Knight Commander of the Order of the Bath

Admiral Sir Algernon Frederick Rous de Horsey KCB DL (25 July 1827 – 22 October 1922) was a Royal Navy officer, appointed aide-de-camp to Queen Victoria. He distinguished himself in Canada during the Fenian raids, and was thanked in Parliament for suppressing riots in Jamaica.

== Early life ==
De Horsey was the son of Spencer de Horsey, of Great Glemham Suffolk, and Lady Louise, a daughter of the first Earl of Stradbroke. His only sister was the Countess of Cardigan, whose reminiscences caused a scandal when they were published.

== Naval career ==
De Horsey joined the Royal Navy in 1840 and served on the coast of Syria later that year. He received the Naval General Service Medal and bar for his service in Syria as well as a medal for his service in Acre given by the Sultan of the Ottoman Empire. Promoted to lieutenant in July 1846 and to commander in June 1853, he was given command of the paddle sloop HMS Devastation that same month and of HMS Victor from November 1855. Promoted to captain in September 1857, he commanded HMS Brisk from May 1859, HMS Wolverine from May 1864, HMS Aurora from November 1865 and HMS Hector from May 1868. He was Senior Officer on the Lakes of Canada during the Fenian raids; for this he was awarded the Canadian Medal. In 1871 he was made ADC to Queen Victoria. In July 1872, having been promoted to commodore, he became Senior Naval Officer in Jamaica with his pennant in HMS Aboukir and responsible for superintending Jamaica Dockyard. He captured the Spanish slave ship Manuela, and suppressed riots in Jamaica for which he was thanked in Parliament. He was promoted to rear-admiral in 1875.

He was appointed Commander-in-Chief, Pacific Station in 1876, with his flag in HMS Repulse, HMS Shah and then HMS Triumph. In this capacity he engaged with the Huáscar during the Peruvian civil war. He was made Commander-in-Chief, Channel Squadron with his flag in HMS Northumberland in December 1884. He was promoted to full Admiral in April 1885 and placed on retired list in July 1892.

On 8 September 1878, Admiral de Horsey in the Shah visited Pitcairn Island. His Admiralty report includes the remark, "One stranger, an American, has settled on the island – a doubtful acquisition." This line inspired Mark Twain to write the short story The Great Revolution in Pitcairn (1879).

He was appointed KCB in the 1903 Birthday Honours and lived at Melcombe House in Cowes. He frequently contributed letters to The Times and wrote An African Pilot and The Rule of the Road at Sea. He was chairman of Isle of Wight magistrates for many years and Deputy Lieutenant. On 7 November 1913, he was appointed a deputy governor of the Isle of Wight. He died on 22 October 1922 and was described by The Times as "Doyen of the Navy". He is buried, together with his wife Caroline, at Carisbrooke (Mountjoy) Cemetery within sight of Carisbrooke Castle.

== Family ==
He married Caroline, daughter of Admiral Andrew Drew, in 1861 and was the father of Louisa Mary Adeline de Horsey Phillips and grandfather of Admiral Tom Phillips. His son was Vice Admiral Victor Yorke de Horsey while his other daughter married Major William Croughton of the 3rd Dragoon Guards.

== Legacy ==
De Horsey Island at the mouth of the Skeena River on the North Coast of British Columbia, Canada, was named for de Horsey, as was De Horsey Passage, which separates it from Smith Island to its west.

Military offices
Preceded by George Hancock	Commander-in-Chief, Pacific Station; 1876–1879	Succeeded by Frederick Stirling
Preceded by The Duke of Edinburgh	Senior Officer in Command of the Channel Squadron; 1884–1885	Succeeded by Charles Fellowes
