= De Horsey Passage =

Strait in British Columbia, Canada

- Coordinates: 54°07′20″N 130°10′03″W

Location
- Interactive map of De Horsey Passage

De Horsey Passage is a short strait in the North Coast of British Columbia, Canada, separating De Horsey Island to the east from Smith Island to the west. The passage, like the island, was named for Rear Admiral Algernon Frederick Rous de Horsey, commander in chief on this station from 1876 to 1879. His flagship was HMS Shah, 26 guns, under Captain Bedford.

Kshaoom Indian Reserve No. 23 is on its northwestern end on De Horsey Island. Opposite is Dashken Indian Reserve No. 22, on the eastern trip of Smith Island.
