= John Quincey Harris =

British politician

Member of Parliament for Newcastle-under-Lyme
- In office 29 June 1841 – 23 July 1842 Serving with Edmund Buckley
- Preceded by: Spencer Horsey de Horsey; William Henry Miller
- Succeeded by: Edmund Buckley; John Campbell Colquhoun

Personal details
- Born: 1815
- Died: 3 August 1846 (aged 30–31)
- Party: Whig

John Quincey Harris (1815 – 3 August 1846) was a British Whig politician.

Harris was elected a Whig Member of Parliament for Newcastle-under-Lyme at the 1841 general election but was unseated via election petition on 11 May 1842 due to bribery by his agent. While he stood again at the resulting by-election, and topped the poll, he was again unseated by election petition due to bribery, and his Conservative rival John Campbell Colquhoun was declared elected in his place.

Parliament of the United Kingdom
Preceded by Spencer Horsey de Horsey; William Henry Miller	Member of Parliament for Newcastle-under-Lyme; 1841–1842; With: Edmund Buckley	Succeeded by Edmund Buckley; John Campbell Colquhoun
