= Comet (clipper) =

1851 American extreme clipper

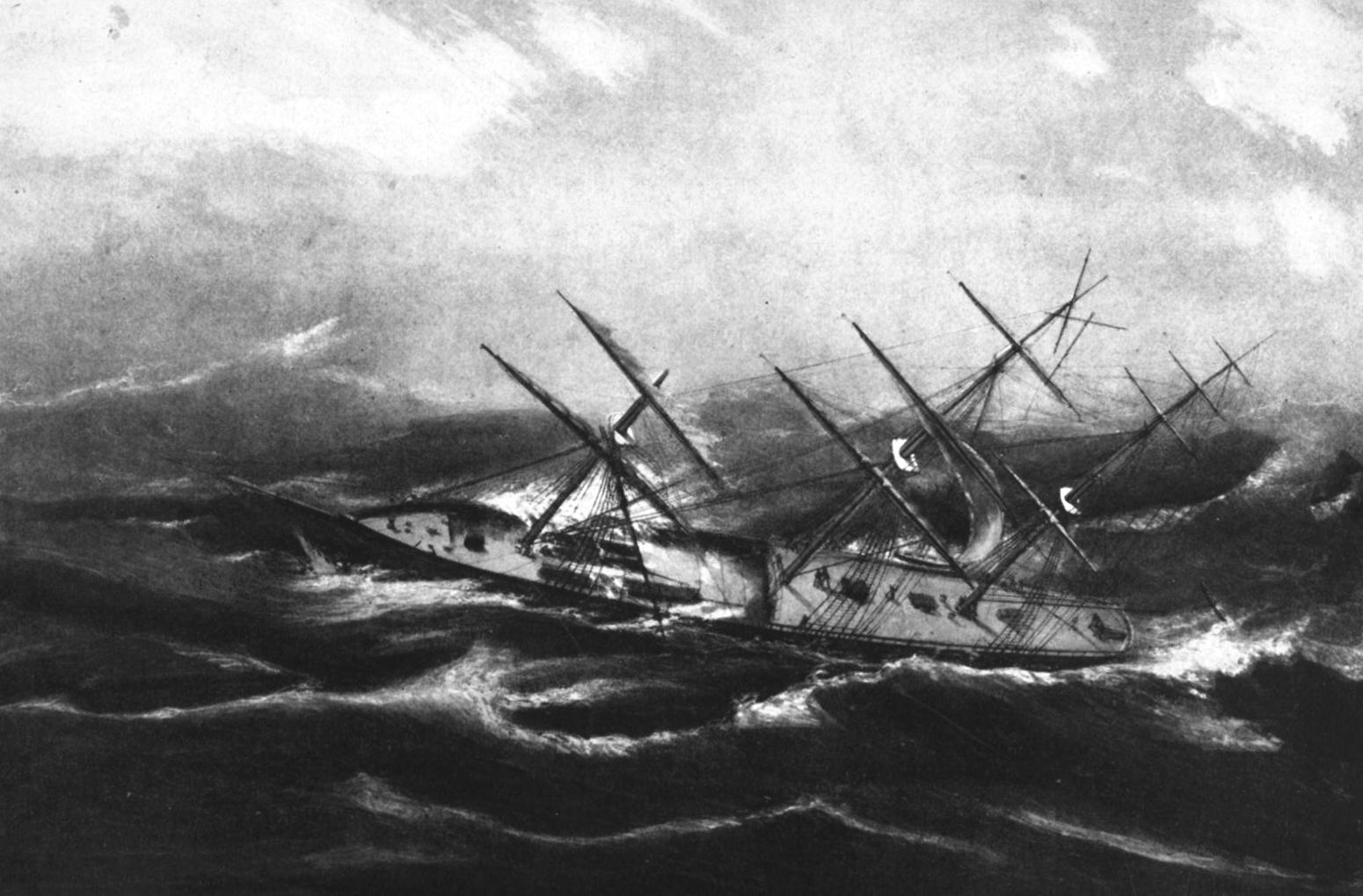

History

United States
- Name: Comet
- Owner: Bucklin & Crane, New York City
- Builder: William H. Webb, New York
- Launched: 10 July 1851
- Fate: Sold to the United Kingdom, 1863

United Kingdom
- Owner: Black Ball Line
- Operator: T. M. Mackay & Co., Liverpool
- Cost: £8,100
- Acquired: 1863
- Renamed: Fiery Star [VNKF]
- Fate: Sank, 12 May 1865

General characteristics
- Class & type: Extreme clipper
- Tons burthen: 1836 tons OM, 1361 tons NM
- Length: 241 ft (73 m) LOA
- Beam: 41 ft 4 in (12.60 m)
- Draft: 22 ft 2 in (6.76 m)
- Notes: 2 decks

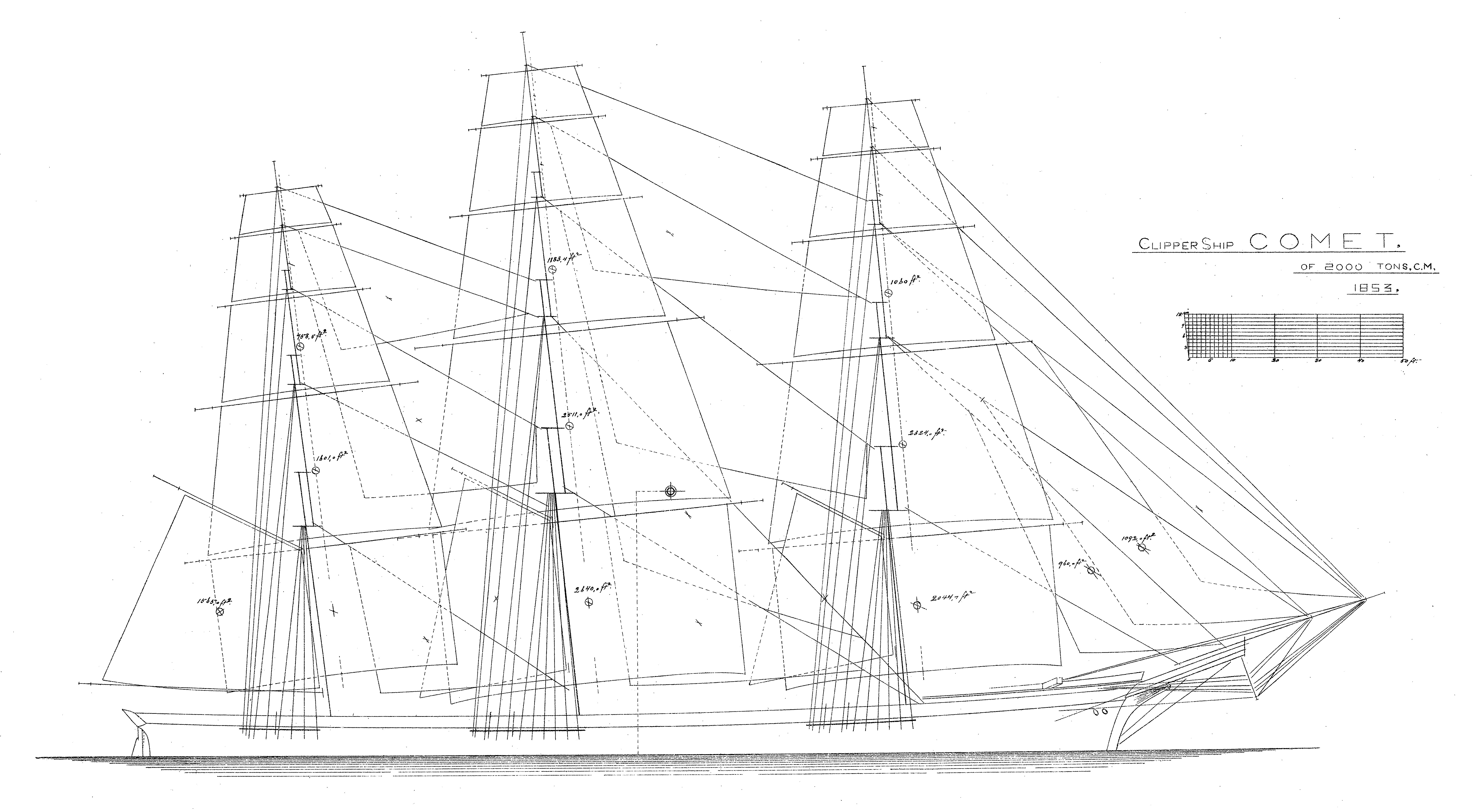
Comet (1851 California clipper) - spars and sails from "PLANS OF WOODEN VESSELS..." by William H. Webb

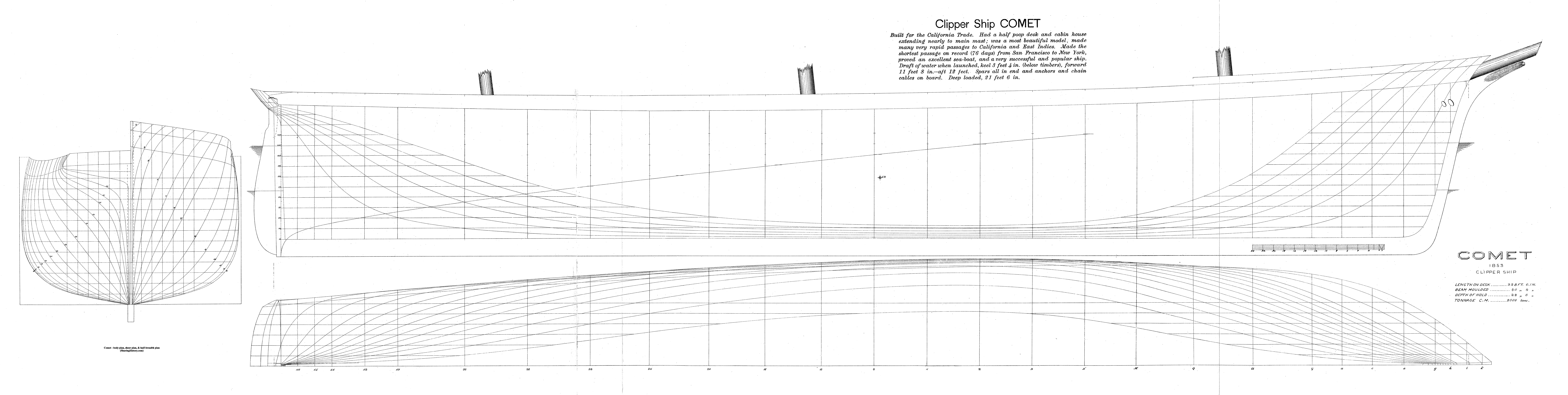
Comet (1851 California clipper) - body plan, sheer plan, & half-breadth plan from "PLANS OF WOODEN VESSELS..." by William H. Webb

Comet was an 1851 California clipper built by William H. Webb which sailed in the Australia trade and the tea trade. This extreme clipper was very fast. She had record passages on two different routes: New York City to San Francisco, and Liverpool to Hong Kong, and beat the famous clipper Flying Dutchman in an 1853 race around the Horn to San Francisco.

In 1863 the Comet was sold to the Black Ball Line and renamed the Fiery Star. She was lost at sea on 12 May 1865 after a fire had broken out in her cargo of wool.

== Ship history ==
=== As the Comet ===
Her first Captain was E. C. Gardner, previously of the Celestial. Her first voyage was from New York to San Francisco, departing on 1 October 1851 and arriving on 12 January 1852 in 103 days. She made a return journey to New York arriving back in San Francisco on 18 January 1853. From there she sailed to Whampoa, where she loaded a cargo of tea and silk for New York. She arrived in New York on 6 May 1853, an 83-day journey.

==== Record passages ====
In February 1853 she raced the Flying Dutchman, another William H. Webb-built clipper, from San Francisco to New York, beating her by 30 hours in a time of 83 days and 18 hours. She returned to San Francisco on 10 December 1853. Sailing to New York again on 27 December, she reached Cape Horn in 35 days 7 hours, which was a record for the route. She reached New York on 14 March 1854 in 76 days (pilot to pilot). She then sailed across the Atlantic to Liverpool. From Liverpool she sailed to Hong Kong arriving there in 83 days 21 hours (pilot to pilot) on 9 September 1854, a record time. Her best days run on the voyage was 350 miles.

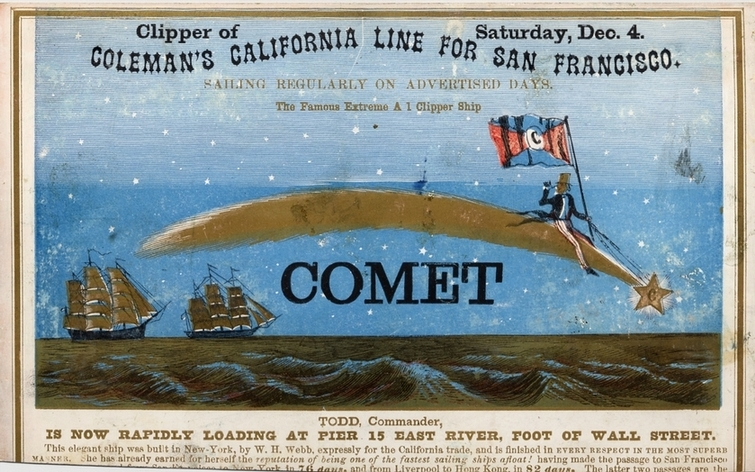
Sailing card

Arriving back in New York from Bremen on 19 August 1855 Captain Arquit replaced Captain Gardner. She made further journeys to San Francisco, New York, and Wampoa through 1856 to 1858. On 15 December 1858 Captain Todd took command of her. In 1859 she sailed to Manila and Anjer. Further trips were made between New York and San Francisco in between 1859 and 1862, as well as journeys to Hong Kong and Macao.

==== Damage ====
On her journey from New York to San Francisco on 2 October 1861 her bowsprit was badly sprung off at Cape Horn. This was followed by her rudderhead being sprung in her 1862 journey from Macao to New York when she encountered a typhoon in the South China Sea.

=== As the Fiery Star ===
On 11 March 1863 she sailed from New York for the final time as the Comet. Arriving in England she had been acquired by T. M. McKay & Co. of Liverpool for the Black Ball Line. She sailed out of London, England, on 11 April 1863 in the Australia trade, with voyages to Queenstown, Moreton Bay, and Brisbane.

==== Loss of the ship ====
The Fiery Star left Moreton Bay, Queensland, Australia, for Liverpool on 1 April 1865 with a crew of 42 under Captain W. Hunter Yule. She had a cargo of wool and 63 passengers. On 17 April she encountered a severe gale and two days later, on 19 April when she was 400 miles north west of the Chatham Islands a fire was discovered by one of the crew, James Adams, in the cargo of wool in her forward hold. Her position at the time was given as being in latitude 46 degrees 10' south and longitude 170 degrees west.

She changed course for Lyttelton while efforts were made to put out the fire. However, the wind changed and a gale rose forcing her to change course for the Hauraki Gulf. By 7 p.m. on 20 April after unsuccessfully trying to put out the fire the captain and 86 people, including all but one of the passengers, abandoned ship in four boats intending to make for the Chatham Islands. There had been six boats on board, but two were lost overboard in the earlier storm. As the remaining boats were too small to carry everyone, the chief officer - W. C. Sargent, a passenger - John Ormond, and 16 crew members volunteered to remain on board. During the night the life boats parted company with the Fiery Star. The remaining crew then constructed a raft in case they had to abandon the ship.

By 25 April the weather began to deteriorate and the seas were rough until 28 April.

By 3 May the ship was thought to be about 98 miles from New Zealand and two islands, possibly Mercury and Alderman were sighted. Another gale struck the ship on 4 May and drove her back out to sea. The wind again changed and by 11 May the ship was thought to be about 25 miles from shore. At 10 p.m. on 11 May lights of another ship, the barque Dauntless was sighted and rockets and cannon were fired, and blue lights shown to attract its attention. The Dauntless sent a lifeboat over and this remained alongside overnight.

At daylight the Chief Officer invited Captain Moore from the Dauntless to come on board to assess the situation. Captain Moore agreed with the Chief Officer's decision to abandon her as the fire was worsening and the ship badly damaged. After transferring as much that was salvageable she was abandoned at 4 p.m. and the crew transferred to the Dauntless. Her position was given as being off Great Barrier Island in latitude 37 degrees 5' south and longitude 175 degrees 42' east (GPS 46.10°S 170.0°W). The Dauntless remained near the Fiery Star until it sank at about 10:30 p.m. (11:30 p.m. in some accounts). The origin of the fire was undetermined.

Seventeen of the eighteen survivors were John Ormond - passenger; W. C. Sargent - Chief Officer; William Marshall - quarter-master; George Maber - engineer; George Strickland - chief steward; John Sutton Palmer - second steward; Charles White - boatswain's mate; David Hariot - sailmaker; James North - carpenter; Knight Stevens, Charles Applequist, John Hargett, Charles Smith, David Payne, John Bullin, Richard Breton - seamen; Richard Herdman - butcher.

A search was mounted on 16 May of the Chatham Islands for the passengers and crew who had left in the lifeboats by HMS Brisk under Captain Charles Webley Hope. The Brisk arrived in the Chathams on 20 May and a search of the island and neighboring Pitt Island found no trace of the missing crew and passengers. Given their distance from the Chathams when they left the Fiery Star and the bad weather in the intervening period, they were presumed to have perished.
