= William Henry Beaumont de Horsey =

William Henry Beaumont de Horsey (born 1826; died 6 May 1915) was a British soldier.

He was the son of Spencer Horsey de Horsey and brother of Algernon Frederick Rous de Horsey and Adeline Louisa Marie de Horsey. He was educated at Eton College.

At the age of sixteen he joined the army, and through the influence of the Duke of Wellington he was commissioned as ensign and lieutenant in the Grenadier Guards on 22 November 1844. His promotion to lieutenant and captain was purchased on 22 March 1850. He served in the Crimean War, and was given army rank as major by brevet dated 12 December 1854. On 13 March 1857 was promoted to captain and lieutenant-colonel, again by purchase, and on 2 March 1858 he was authorised to accept the Order of the Medjidie, fifth class, conferred upon him by Sultan Abdülmecid I of Turkey.

On 29 April 1868 he was granted brevet rank of colonel in the army, and on 9 April 1870 was appointed to the regimental rank of Major. On 27 February 1872 he served as Field Officer in Brigade Waiting for the Thanksgiving at St Paul's Cathedral following the recovery of the Prince of Wales from typhoid. On 22 September 1875 he was promoted to Lieutenant-Colonel of the Grenadier Guards, and on 15 September 1877, having served nearly thirty-three years in the regiment, he retired on half-pay. On 7 May 1878, when he was living at 1 Cleveland Row, St James's, his bankruptcy was announced in the Gazette. Nevertheless, on 11 June 1878 his promotion to Major-General was announced, effective from 13 February 1878. On 13 February 1883 he retired from the Army with the honorary rank of Lieutenant-General, due to ill-health.

Military offices
| Preceded by Michael Bruce | Commanding Officer of the Grenadier Guards; 1875–1877 | Succeeded by George William Alexander Higginson |
