= Dashken Indian Reserve No. 22 =

Coordinates: 54°09′00″N 130°09′00″W

Dashken Indian Reserve No. 22, officially Dashken 22, is an Indian reserve in the North Coast region of British Columbia, Canada, located on the east tip of Smith Island, which is immediately south of the Tsimpsean Peninsula and the City of Prince Rupert.

Dashken IR No. 22, which is 3.0 ha in area, is shared by the Lax Kw'alaams and Metlakatla governments.

== See also ==
- List of Indian reserves in British Columbia
