= HMS Brisk (1851) =

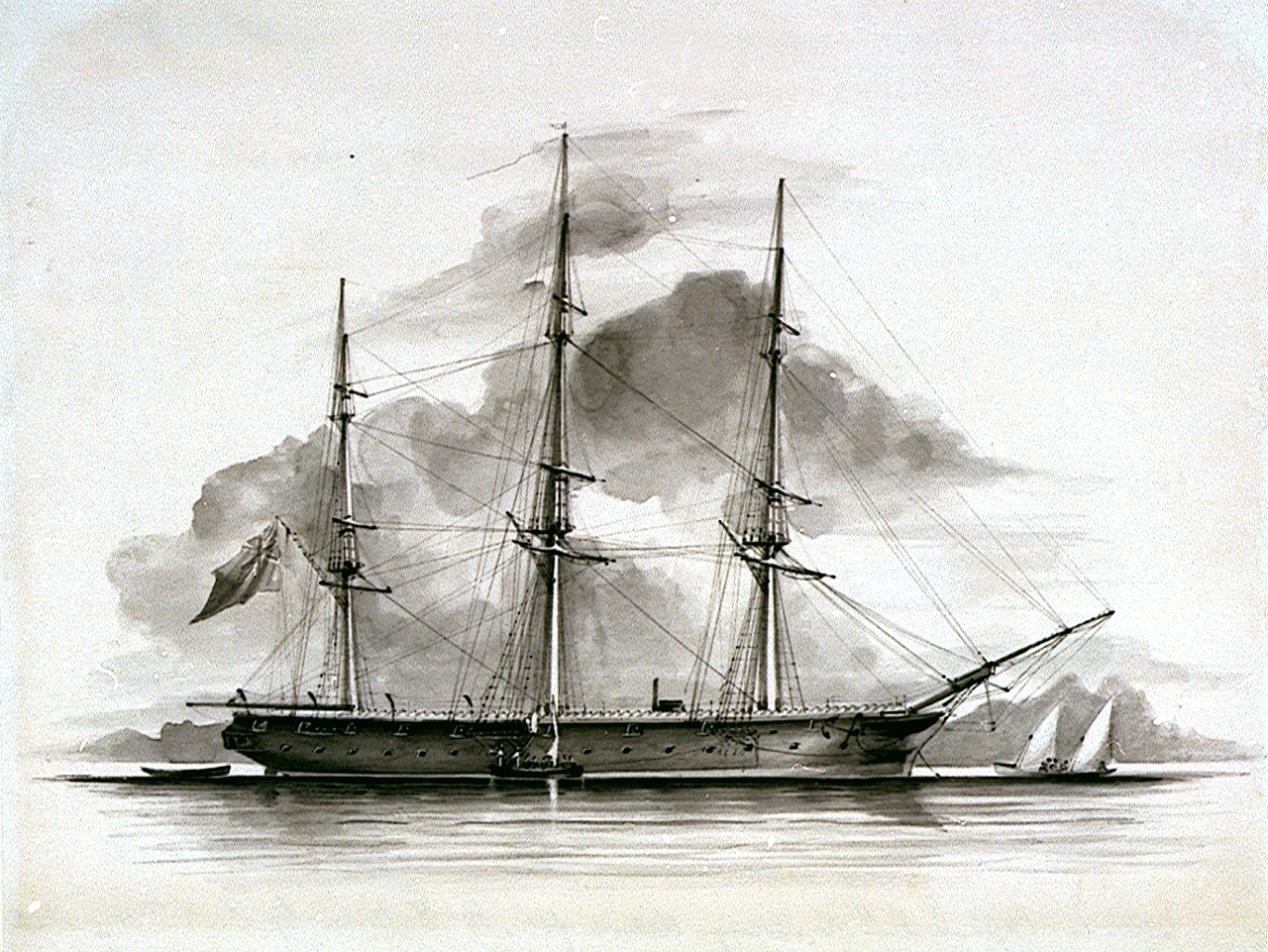
- Brisk, Capt A. F. R. de Horsey drawn in 1860

History

United Kingdom
- Name: HMS Brisk
- Ordered: 25 April 1847
- Builder: Woolwich Dockyard
- Cost: £47,482
- Laid down: January 1849
- Launched: 2 June 1851
- Completed: 24 August 1853 at Devonport Dockyard
- Commissioned: 24 May 1853
- Decommissioned: 19 January 1869
- Honours and awards: Pacific 1854–55
- Fate: Sold on 31 January 1870

General characteristics as built
- Type: Screw sloop (corvette from 1862)
- Displacement: 1,474 long tons (1,498 t)
- Tons burthen: 1,086 90/94 bm
- Length: 193 ft 7 1/4 in (59.0 m) gundeck; 169 ft 9 1/4 in (51.7 m) keel reported for tonnage
- Beam: 35 ft (10.7 m) maximum, 34 ft 6 in (10.5 m) reported for tonnage
- Draught: 14 ft 8 in (4.5 m) forward, 16 ft 8 in (5.1 m) Aft
- Depth of hold: 20 ft 5 1/4 in (6.2 m)
- Installed power: 250 nominal horsepower; 505 ihp (377 kW); (From 1864: 200 nhp & 837 ihp)
- Propulsion: Scott, Sinclair & Co. 2-cylinder horizontal single-expansion steam engine; Single screw; (From 1864: Miller, Ravenhill & Salkeld 2-cylinder HSE steam engine)
- Speed: 7.35 kn (13.61 km/h); (From 1864: 9.989 kn (18.500 km/h))
- Complement: 170 to 175
- Armament: 2 × 68-pounder (87 cwt) MLSB guns; 8 × 32-pounder (42 cwt) MLSB guns (increased to 12); final armament; 1 × 68-pounder (87 cwt) MLSB gun; 14 × 32-pounder (32 cwt) MLSB guns

HMS Brisk was a 14-gun wooden-hulled screw sloop designed by the Committee of Reference as part of the 1847 program. She is considered an enlarged Rattler with the design approved in 1847. She was ordered on 25 April 1847 from Woolwich Dockyard as a 10-gun sloop, but the guns were later increased due to the Russian War, to 14 guns by increasing the number of 32-pounder guns. She was launched on 2 June 1851 from Woolwich Dockyard. She served in the Russian War of 1854- 55 and as part of the Southern African anti-slavery patrol, with a final commission on the Australian Station. She was sold in 1870 for use in a pioneer, but unsuccessful, telegraph service.

Brisk was the fourth vessel of the name, since it was introduced for a 16-gun sloop launched by Jacobs of Sandgate on 6 May 1784 and sold in May 1805.

== Construction and specifications ==
Brisk's keel was laid in January 1849 at Woolwich Dockyard and she was launched on 2 June 1851. Her gun deck was 193 ft 7.25 in (59.0 m) with her keel length reported for tonnage calculation of 169 ft 10 in (51.8 m). Her maximum breadth was 35 ft 2.25 in (10.7 m) reported for tonnage was 34 ft 8.25 in (10.6 m). She had a depth of hold of 20 ft 5.25 in (6.2 m). Her builder's measure tonnage was 1,086 tons and displaced 1,087 tons. Her minimum draught was 14 ft 8 in (4.5 m) forward and 16 feet 8 inches 16 ft 8 in (5.1 m) aft.

On 26 June 1851, she arrived at Greenock to have her machinery fitted by Scott, Sinclair & Company. She shipped two rectangular fire tube boilers. Her engine was a 2-cylinder horizontal single expansion (HSE) steam engine with cylinders of 52 in (1,320.8 mm) in diameter with a 42 in (1,066.8 mm) stroke, rated at 250 nominal horsepower (NHP). She had a single screw propeller. Brisk arrived at Devonport from Scotland on 21 May 1852.

In 1864, her engine was replaced by a Miller, Ravenhill & Salkeld engine with two cylinders of 45 in (1,143.0 mm) diameter pistons with a 24 in (609.6 mm) stroke rated at 200 NHP.

Her initial armament consisted of two Dundas 1853 68-pounder 87 hundredweight (cwt) muzzle-loading smoothbore (MLSB) 10-foot solid-shot gun and eight Monk's 'C' 1839 32-pounder 42 cwt MLSB 8.5-foot solid-shot guns on broadside trucks. The 32-pounders were increased to twelve guns for the Russian War. In 1856 she was rearmed with a single Dundas 1853 68-pounder MLSB of 87 cwt 10-foot solid-shot gun on a pivot mount and fourteen Monk's 'C' 1839 32-pounder 42 cwt MLSB solid-shot guns on broadside trucks.

=== Trials ===
During steam trials her engine generated 505 ihp (377 kW) for a speed of 7.35 kn (13.61 km/h). On her trials after the engine change, the engine generated 637 ihp (475 kW) for a speed of 9.989 kn (18.500 km/h).

Brisk was completed for sea on 24 August 1853 at a cost of £47,482 (including hull of £20,677).

== Commissioned service ==
=== First commission ===
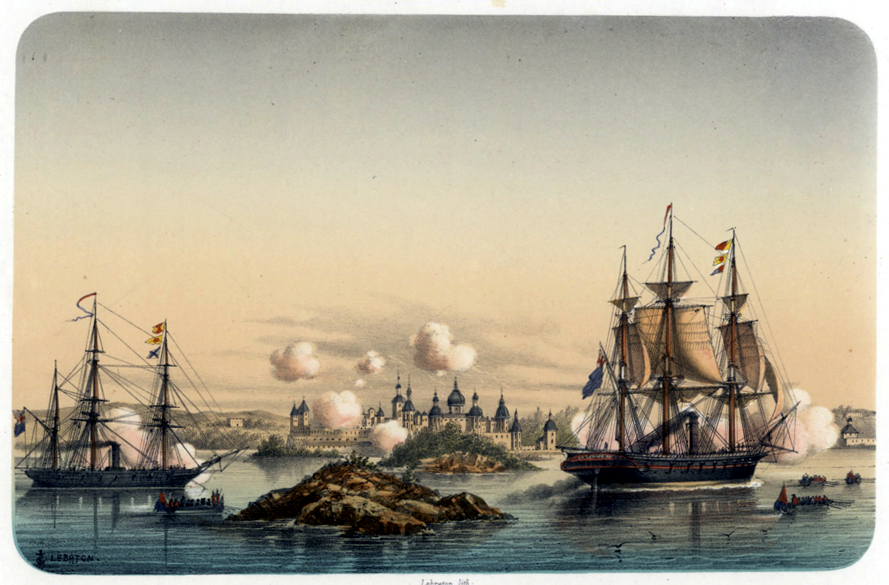
Attack on the small town of Novitska (near Kola) by HMS Brisk and HMS Miranda, August 1854.

She was commissioned on 24 May 1853 under the command of Commander Frederick Beauchamp Paget Seymour for service on the North America and West Indies Station. During her transit to Jamaica she carried the new governor to Port Royal, Jamaica. With the Russian War, she returned to Home Waters and joined Captain Sir Erasmus Ommanney's Squadron for service in the White Sea. The squadron searched for Russian ships then bombarded the port of Kola on 24 August. The squadron withdrew from the White Sea before the winter freeze up. With Commander Alfred J. Curtis, RN, taking command on 20 October 1854 she was sent to the Russian Pacific Coast to blockade Russian ports. On 1 June 1855 the squadron entered the harbour of Petropavlovsk, but found it abandoned. The batteries and magazines were then destroyed. On 7 June an eruption of Kozelsky was witnessed. Upon the sessation of hostilities, she returned to Home Waters, paying off at Plymouth on 13 June 1857.

=== Second commission ===
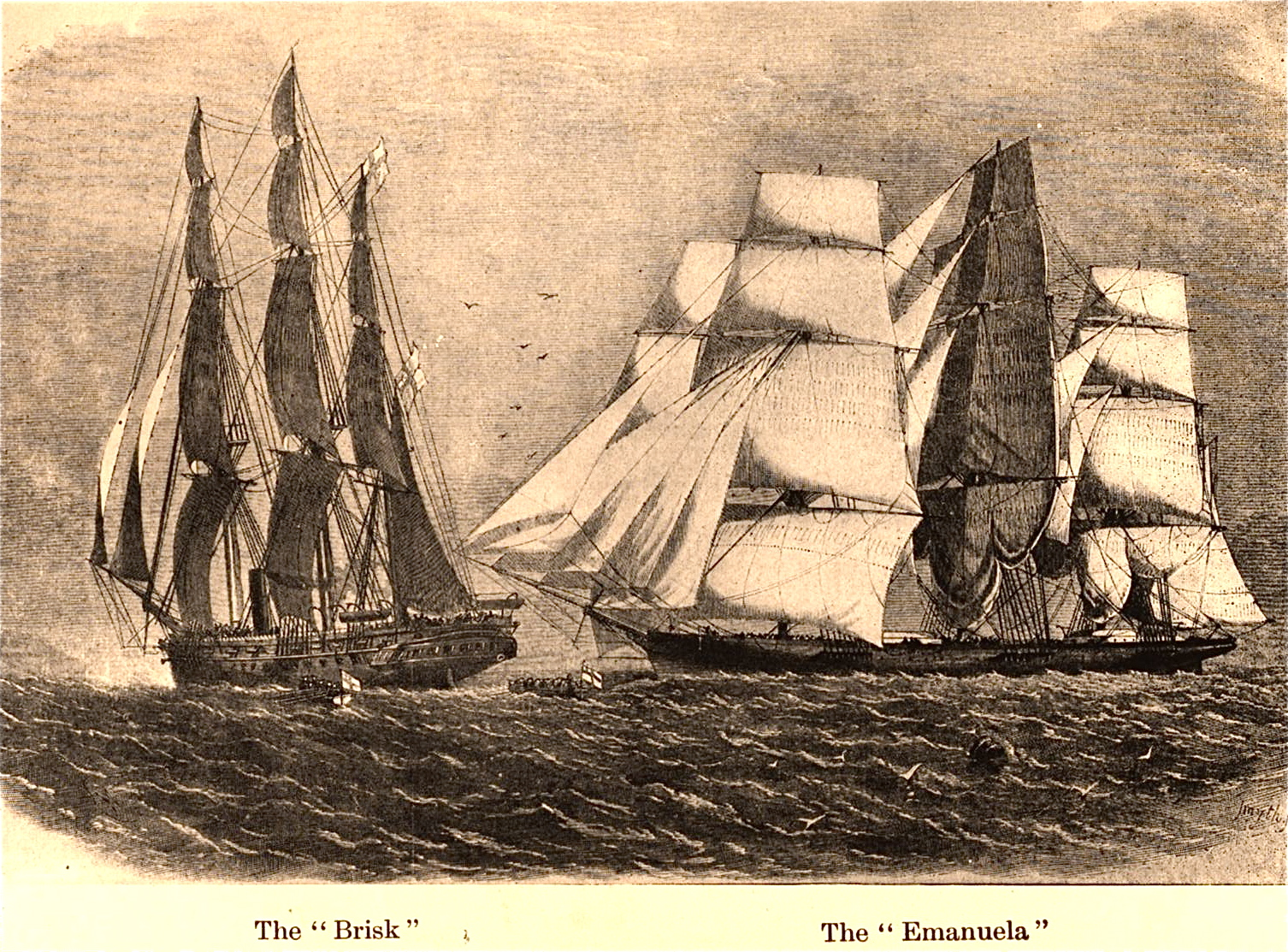
Brisk captures the slave ship Emanuela in 1860

After almost two years in reserve, she was commissioned under Captain Algernon F.R. de Horsey for service on the Cape of Good Hope Station. Apart from anti-slavery patrols, she also searched for Dr. Livingstone on 15 September 1859 at the River Kongone. In November she picked up the survivors of the Barretto Junior which had run aground on Mayotte Reef while heading for Mayotte. On 10 August 1860 she captured the clipper ship Emanuela in the Mozambique Channel with more than 800 slaves aboard. With Captain de Horsey becoming invalid due to illness, he was replaced with Captain John P. Luce, RN, and assigned to the West Coast of Africa on 24 February 1862. She returned to Home Waters in 1863, paying off at Plymouth on 22 August.

=== Third commission ===
Brisk's last commission was on 30 August 1864 under Captain Charles W. Hope, RN, for service on the Australia Station. She was sent to relieve HMS Miranda. Sailing around the Cape of Good Hope, she arrived in Sydney on 15 January 1865. Once there she received orders to proceed immediately to New Zealand and join the squadron at Auckland. She arrived in Auckland on 5 February, with the Miranda departing the same day. The Brisk was to undertake escort duties during the New Zealand Wars.

Her first task was to take 300–400 troops of the 2nd Battalion, 14th Regiment, under Colonel W. C. Trevor from Manukau to Whanganui on 1 March 1865. Returning to Auckland she took Governor Grey to Kawau on 1 May. On 15 May she received news from the Dauntless of the demise of the clipper Fiery Star. She sailed for the Chatham Islands to search for the missing passengers and crew. None were found and she returned to Auckland.

On 6 August she took 300 soldiers of the 70th Regiment from Taranaki to Napier and from there she was involved in the fighting around Ōpōtiki. In early 1866 she took soldiers of the 43rd Regiment to Taranaki. After this she left Auckland and sailed around the south sea islands, returning to Sydney on 26 September for a refit. From 10 January to 3 May 1867 she took Governor Grey on a tour around New Zealand's South Island.

In September 1868 she left the Australia Station.

== Telegraph service ==
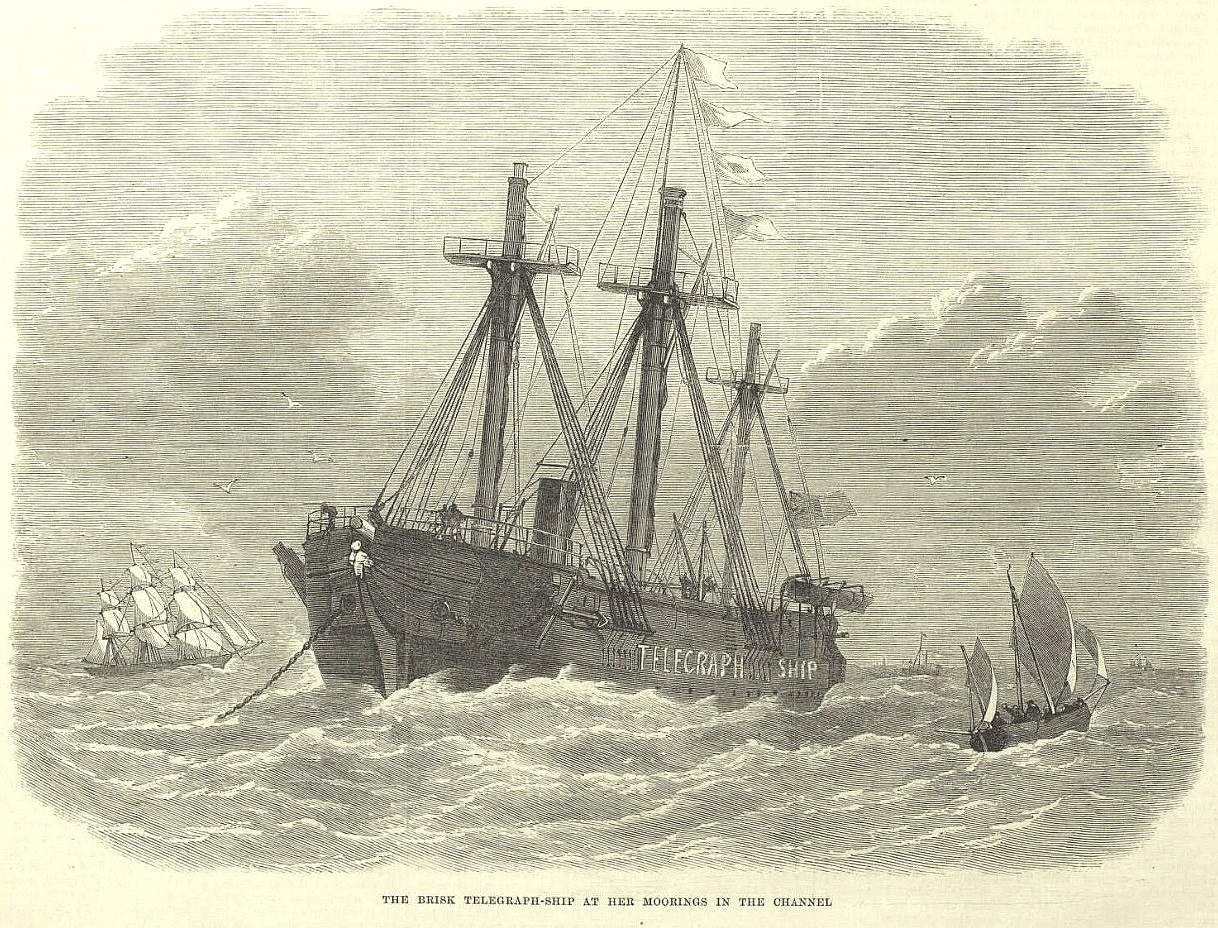
Brisk in 1870, moored southwest of Land's End, as an experimental telegraph ship

She was decommissioned on 19 January 1869, then sold on 31 January 1870 to the International Mid-channel Telegraph Company Ltd and registered under the same name at London (Official number 63570). Anchored at 49°20′N 6°17′W on Admiralty Patch, 49 nautical miles (91 km) south southwest of Land's End in April 1870, Brisk was part of an experimental telegraph service based at Porthcurno, Cornwall. Cable breakages and sea-sickness amongst the signallers ended the venture after two months, in June 1870. In August 1870 the telegraph company was bankrupt and Brisk was sold at London by the liquidators.

== Legacy ==
Brisk Bay in Queensland, Australia, is named after her.
