= De Horsey Island =

Island in British Columbia, Canada

Coordinates: 54°07′09″N 130°08′34″W

De Horsey Island is an island at the mouth of the Skeena River in the North Coast region of British Columbia, Canada, immediately south of the southern tip of the Tsimpsean Peninsula and immediately east of Smith Island. Separating it from that island is De Horsey Passage; and to its north, separating it from the Tsimpsean Peninsula, is Eleanor Passage. Kshaoom Indian Reserve No. 23 is on its northwest tip.

== Name origin ==
The island was named in 1877 for Rear Admiral Algernon Frederick Rous de Horsey, commander in chief on the Pacific Station from 1876 to 1879. His flagship was HMS Shah, 26 guns, under Captain Bedford.

== See also ==
- List of islands of British Columbia
