= Adeline, Countess of Cardigan and Lancastre =

British noble

The Right Honourable The Countess of Cardigan
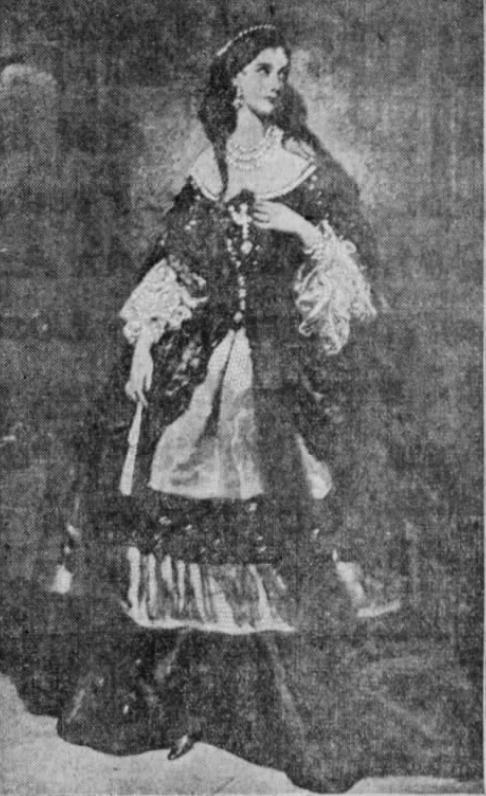
- Adeline at the time of her wedding in 1858
- Born: Adeline Louisa Maria Kilderbee; 24 December 1824; London, England
- Died: 25 May 1915 (aged 90); Deene Park, Northamptonshire, England
- Notable work: My Recollections memoir
- Spouses: James Brudenell, 7th Earl of Cardigan (m. 1858; died 1868) António Manuel de Saldanha e Lancastre, 1st Count of Lancastre (m. 1873; died 1898)

Adeline Louisa Maria, Countess of Cardigan, Condessa de Lancastre (24 December 1824 – 25 May 1915) was the second wife of the English peer James Brudenell, 7th Earl of Cardigan, and later the wife of the Portuguese nobleman Dom António Manuel de Saldanha e Lancastre, 1st Count of Lancastre. After her marriage to the Earl of Cardigan in 1858, Queen Victoria refused to have her at court because Cardigan had left his first wife. She was the claimed author of scandalous memoirs, My Recollections, published in 1909, under the name Adeline Louisa Maria de Horsey Cardigan and Lancastre, though strictly speaking she was not allowed by the rules governing the British peerage to join her former and current titles together. Her book detailed events and people coupled with gossip concerning the establishment of Victorian England.

== Early life ==
Adeline was born near Berkeley Square, London, the first child and only daughter of Spencer Horsey Kilderbee and his wife, Lady Louisa Maria Judith (daughter of John Rous, 1st Earl of Stradbroke). From 1832, her father took the surname "de Horsey", after his mother's maiden name. Her younger brothers were Algernon Frederick Rous de Horsey and William Henry Beaumont de Horsey. She made her entry into society in 1842, and became engaged to Infante Carlos, Count of Montemolin, the Carlist claimant to the Spanish throne, in 1848.

== Countess of Cardigan ==
Rumours spread after Adeline was frequently seen riding without a chaperone in the company of seventh Earl of Cardigan, who famously led the Charge of the Light Brigade at the Battle of Balaclava in 1854, and was a friend of her father. The Earl was still married to the former Mrs. Elizabeth Tollemache Johnstone, after she was divorced by another army officer. Criticism from her father caused Adeline de Horsey to leave home in 1857. After a period in a hotel, she took a furnished house in Norfolk Street, Park Lane, and became the Earl of Cardigan's mistress. After the Earl's wife died in July, 1858, the couple sailed away together on the Earl's yacht and married in Gibraltar on 28 September, 1858. Although shunned by polite society, Adeline de Horsey was an accomplished musician and horsewoman, and acknowledged as a leading courtesan. She was left a life interest in the Cardigan estates on her husband's death in March 1868.

== Second marriage ==
After she was widowed, the Countess of Cardigan received a number of marriage proposals. One was from Benjamin Disraeli, whom she had known all her life. She reported that although she liked him very well, he had one drawback – his bad breath. She decided not to marry Disraeli and shortly after, while holidaying in Paris, she met and became engaged to a Portuguese nobleman, Dom António Manuel de Saldanha e Lancastre, 1st Count of Lancastre, a descendant of John of Gaunt. They were married at the Roman Catholic Chapel, King Street, Portman Square on 28 August 1873. Against usual custom, she merged her former title as an English dowager countess with her new title as wife of a Portuguese count, and styled herself the Countess of Cardigan and Lancastre. When first married, the couple lived in England. However the Count, who suffered from chronic bronchitis, was unable to tolerate the English fogs and winter weather. He was also bored by country life, preferring to live in Paris. In 1879 however, the Countess realised she needed to return to England as her estates were suffering from her absence. The marriage lasted until the Count's death from bronchitis in 1898 and, although the Countess regularly travelled to the continent to visit her husband, they did not live together after 1879.

Her title as Countess of Lancastre caused displeasure to Queen Victoria, who liked to travel incognito in Europe as "Countess of Lancaster."

== Later life ==
She became more eccentric in old age. As a widow, she scandalised society by wearing thick make-up and organizing steeplechases through the local graveyard "and became everyone's idea of a merry widow." She kept her coffin in the house, and she would often lie in it, asking for opinions on her appearance. Eventually her profligate spending led to bankruptcy, which forced the sale of many of her clothes, carriages and horses. She was often seen, locally, cycling clad in her first husband's regimental trousers. She smoked cigarettes in public at a time when it was considered improper for a lady to do so. She died at Deene Park on 25 May 1915 and was buried near her first husband in the Deene parish church.

A character who may have been very loosely based on her was portrayed in the 1968 film, The Charge of the Light Brigade.

Her memoirs, My Recollections, were ghostwritten by the author Maude Ffoulkes.
