= Spencer Horsey de Horsey =

British politician

Spencer Horsey de Horsey (1790 – 20 May 1860), known until 1832 as Spencer Horsey Kilderbee, was a British Tory politician. He sat in the House of Commons between 1829 and 1841.

== Family ==
He was the son of the Rev. Samuel Kilderbee, DD, rector of Campsey Ash, and his wife Caroline, the only daughter (and heir) of Samuel Horsey from Bury St Edmunds. In 1824, at Wangford, he was married to Lady Louisa Rous, youngest daughter of John Rous, 1st Earl of Stradbroke, by whom he was the father of Algernon Frederick Rous de Horsey (born 1827), William Henry Beaumont de Horsey (born 1826) and Adeline Louisa Maria de Horsey (born 1824). He died at his house in Cowes, but also lived at 8, Upper Grosvenor Street, Mayfair (from 1830 to 1858) and at Great Glemham in Suffolk. He was buried in the Kilderbee family vault in St. Mary's Churchyard, Carisbrooke on 25 May 1860.

== Career ==
He was elected as a member of parliament (MP) for Aldeburgh in Suffolk at a by-election in May 1829, and held the seat until the 1830 general election, when he was returned for Orford, also in Suffolk. He was re-elected in 1831, and held the seat until the 1832 general election, when the borough was disenfranchised under the Reform Act.

In April 1832 he changed his name by Royal Licence to Spencer Horsey de Horsey, after his mother's maiden name.

He returned to Parliament after a five-year absence when he was elected at the 1837 general election as MP for the borough of Newcastle-under-Lyme in Staffordshire. He held the seat until the 1841 general election, when he did not stand again.

== Sources ==
- Death notice in The Gentleman's Magazine, 1860, online at Google Books
- "Upper Grosvenor Street: North Side | British History Online" – via British History Online.

Parliament of the United Kingdom
Preceded by Joshua Walker; Marquess of Douro	Member of Parliament for Aldeburgh; 1829–1830; With: Marquess of Douro	Succeeded by Marquess of Douro; John Wilson Croker
Preceded by Sir Henry Frederick Cooke; Quintin Dick	Member of Parliament for Orford; 1830–1832; With: Sir Henry Frederick Cooke	Constituency abolished
Preceded by William Henry Miller; Edmund Peel	Member of Parliament for Newcastle-under-Lyme; 1837–1841; With: William Henry Miller	Succeeded by Edmund Buckley; John Quincey Harris
