= Smith Island (British Columbia) =

Island in British Columbia, Canada

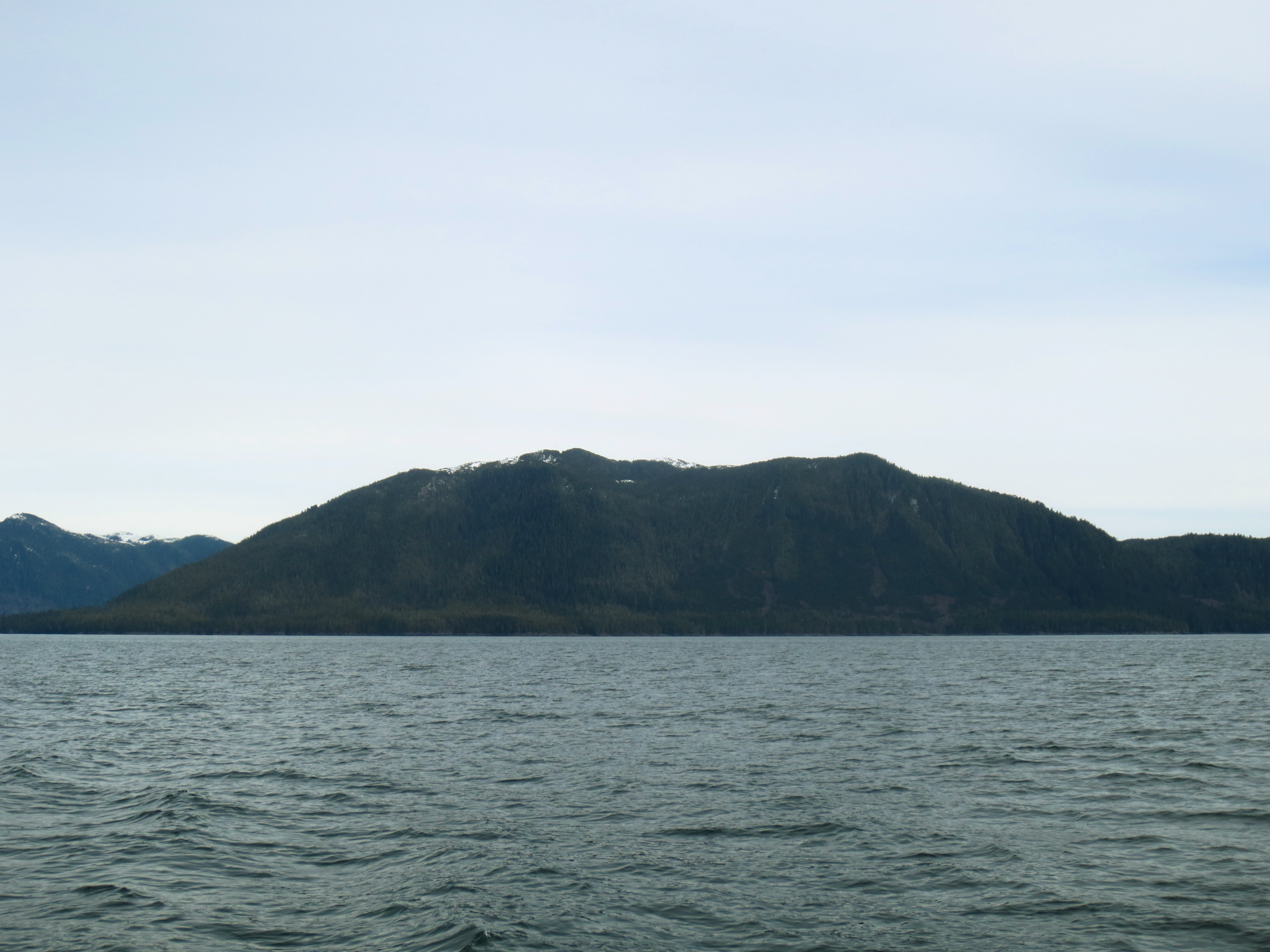
- West side of Smith Island as seen from the northern approach to Marcus Passage

- Location within British Columbia

Geography
- Coordinates: 54°09′03″N 130°13′26″W

Smith Island is an island just north of the mouth of the Skeena River in the North Coast region of British Columbia, Canada.

== Geography ==
Mount McGrath, facing Chatham Sound is a notable feature of the east side of the island.

Tsum Tsadai Inlet is a narrow inlet on the north side of the island, with its opening to the west. The inlet provides a well protected anchorage for small craft, but should be approached with caution at slack tide, as a group of drying reefs surround the approach, and tidal currents upwards of 5 knots (9.3 km/h; 5.8 mph) are known at the entrance.

To the south of the island is Marcus Passage. To the north is Inverness Passage, separating Smith Island from the Tsimpsean Peninsula. Eleanor Passage, connects Osborn Point, the most eastern point on the island, with the mouth of the Skeena River. De Horsey Passage separates De Horsey Island from Smith Island on the latter's east side. Croasdaile Island is to the south of the southern tip of Smith Island.

== Settlements ==
Dashken Indian Reserve No. 22 is on the east side of Smith Island, facing De Horsey Island which is to the east. South of the reserve, also facing De Horsey Island, is the ruins of the former post office and wharf of Osland. Hazel Point marks the southern tip of the island, just east of the point is a bay that is site of the former cannery and settlement of Oceanic.
