= Tsimpsean Peninsula =

Peninsula in British Columbia, Canada

- Peninsula
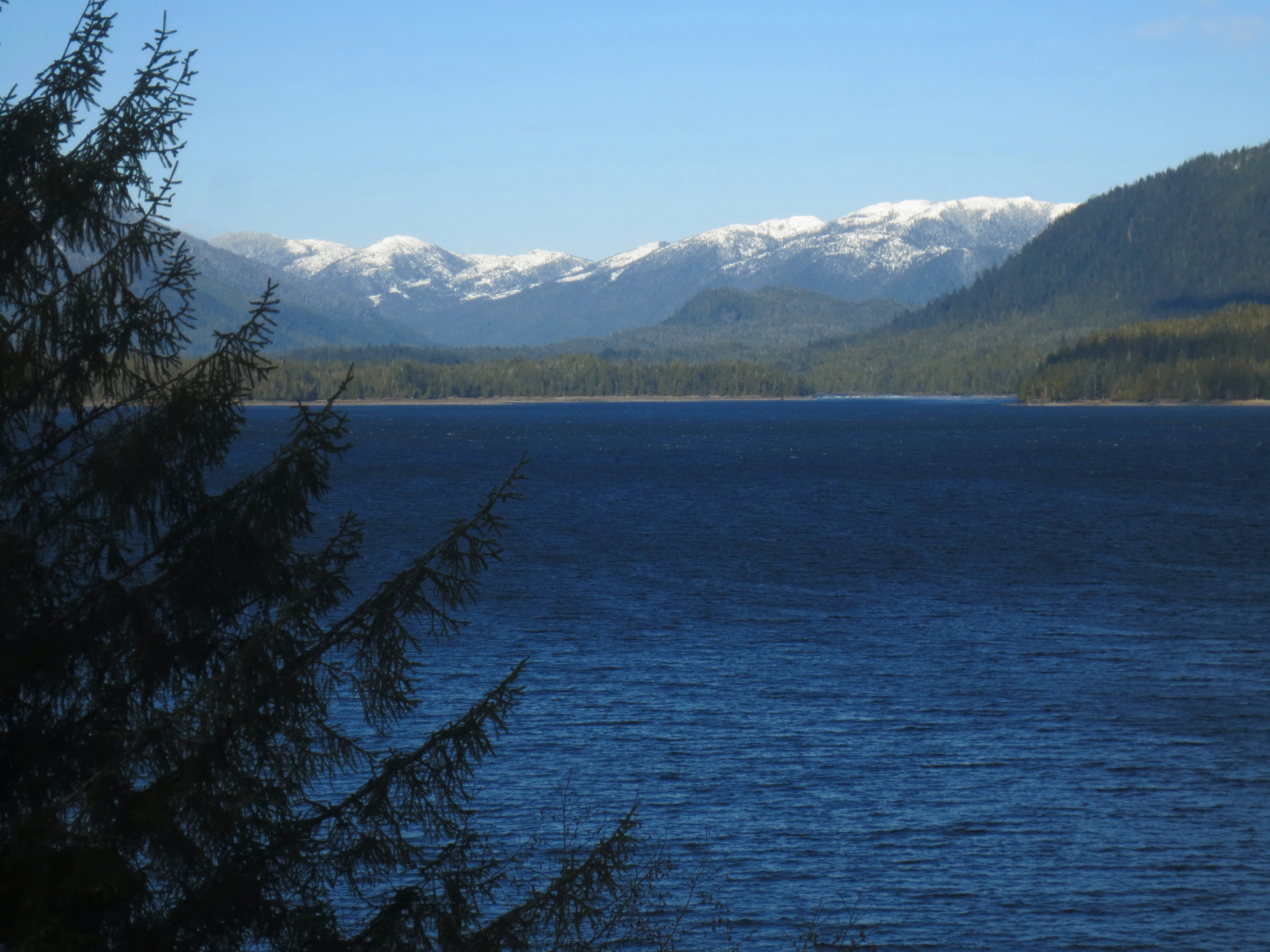
- Looking up the Tsimpsean Peninsula from across Morse Basin

- Coordinates: 54°24′16″N 130°11′59″W
- Topo map: NTS 103J8 Prince Rupert

The Tsimpsean Peninsula is a peninsula in the Range 5 Coast Land District on the North Coast of British Columbia, extending between Chatham Sound and Work Channel, and extending south to the Skeena River.

== Name ==
The name is that of the Tsimshian peoples, and was conferred in 1927 by the Geographic Names Board of Canada, who noted the variety of spellings then in use i.e. "Tsimshean, Timshian, Chimsain, Tsimpsian, Tsimp-Sheean, Chimsyan" before settling on this one.

Aberdeen Passage and Eleanor Passage separate the peninsula from Smith and De Horsey Islands, which are immediately south, and like other waters in the area are part of the Skeena estuary.

== Ecosystems ==
The Tsimpsean Peninsula is broken into two main ecosystems:

Coastal Lowlands are characterized by low topography, alternating bedrock and muskeg. Notable wildlife associated with this habitat includes Sandhill Cranes, Canada Geese, Wilson's snipe, Sitka Deer, Wolf, and Black Bear.

Central Highlands consist of rugged mountains covered by montane vegetation and temperate rainforest. Notable wildlife associated with this habitat includes Deer, bald eagle, grouse, squirrel and marten.

== Images ==
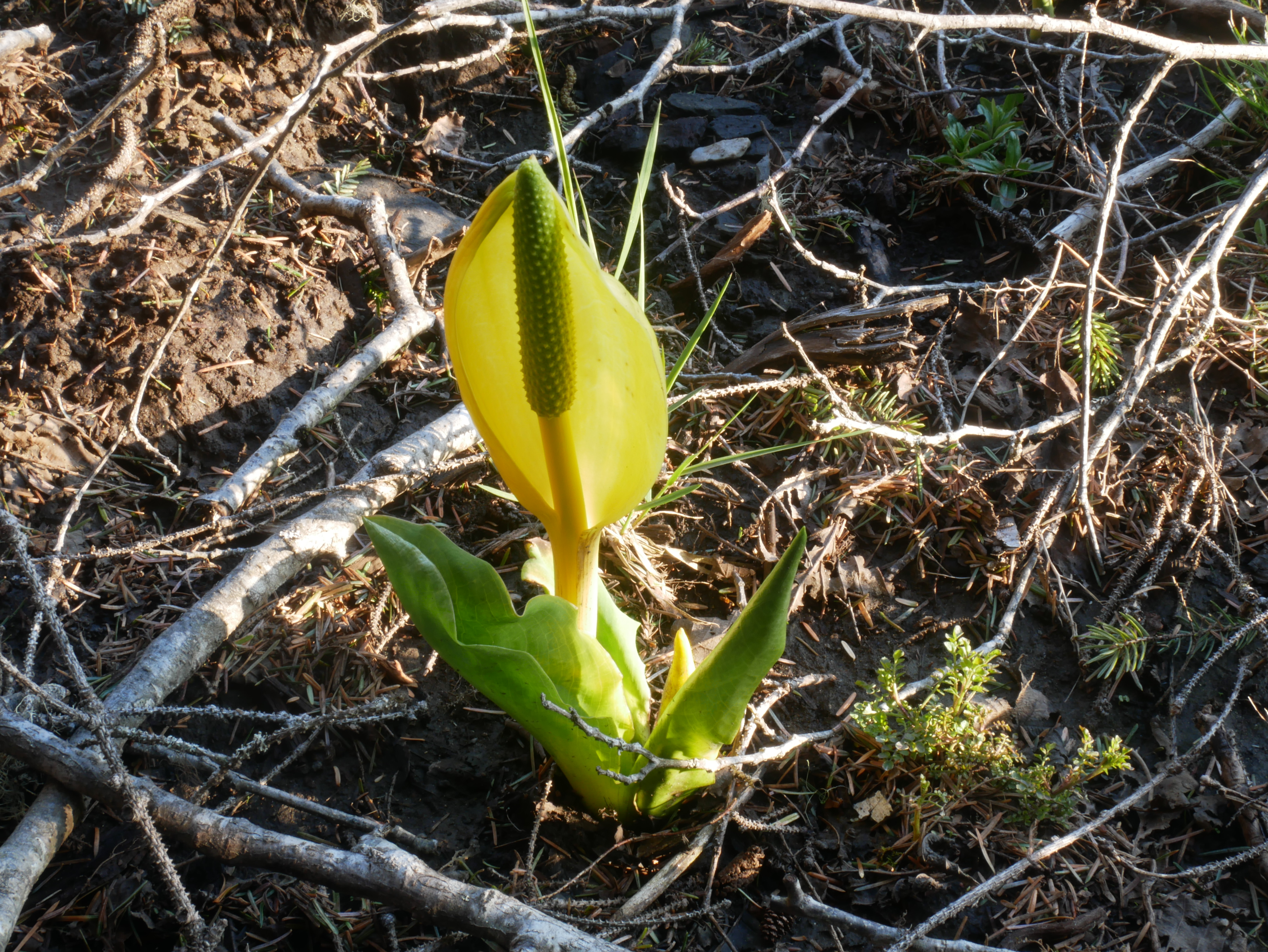
Skunk Cabbage sprouting in the Tsimpsean Peninsula
