= Samuel Christy-Miller =

British politician and businessman

Samuel Christy-Miller, originally Samuel Christy and from 1862 by royal licence actually Samuel Christie Miller (1810–1889) was an English businessman and politician, from 1847 to 1859 one of the two members of parliament for Newcastle-under-Lyme, elected as a Peelite.

== Life ==
He was the second son of Thomas Christy of Brooklands, Essex, eldest son of Miller Christy, founder of the hat-making firm Christy & Co, and Rebecca Hawlings. He became a partner in the family hat-making firm.

Christy was related, though distantly, to William Henry Miller (a first cousin of his grandfather), who died in 1848. He inherited indirectly from Miller estates at Craigentinny and Britwell Court near Burnham, which had a noted library. At that point he changed surname to Christy-Miller. Miller had been Member of Parliament for Newcastle-under-Lyme, and Christy-Miller also stood successfully for that constituency. He was a Peelite.

Having married Mary Hardcastle in 1842, he had a son, William Henry Archibald (1850-1884), who predeceased him without issue. His heir was his nephew Wakefield Christie Miller.
