= HMS Shah (1873) =

Frigate of the Royal Navy

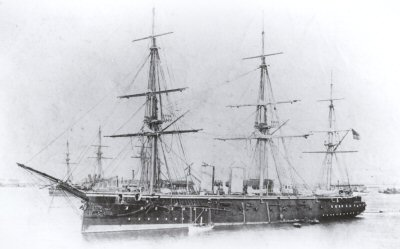
- Shah at anchor

History

United Kingdom
- Name: HMS Shah
- Namesake: Shah of Persia
- Owner: Royal Navy
- Builder: Portsmouth Dockyard
- Laid down: 7 March 1870
- Launched: 10 September 1873
- Completed: December 1875
- Commissioned: 14 August 1876
- Out of service: December 1904
- Fate: Converted to Coal Storage Hulk C.470; Sold 19 September 1919; Wrecked in Bermuda 1926

General characteristics
- Type: Unarmored steam frigate
- Displacement: 6,250 long tons (6,350 t)
- Tons burthen: 4,210 bm
- Length: 334 ft (101.8 m) (p/p)
- Beam: 52 ft (15.8 m)
- Draught: 25 ft 7 in (7.8 m)
- Installed power: 7,480 ihp (5,580 kW)
- Propulsion: 1 shaft; 1 × 2-cylinder compound expansion steam engine; 10 cylindrical boilers
- Sail plan: Ship rig
- Speed: 16 knots (30 km/h; 18 mph)
- Range: 6,840 nmi (12,670 km; 7,870 mi) at 10 knots (19 km/h; 12 mph)
- Complement: 600
- Armament: 2 × 9-inch (229 mm) rifled muzzle-loading guns; 16 × 7-inch (178 mm) 6½ ton rifled muzzle-loading guns; 8 × 5-inch (127 mm) breech-loading guns; 3 × quick-firing guns; 12 × machine guns; 4 × torpedo launcher

The first HMS Shah was a nineteenth-century unarmoured iron hulled, wooden sheathed frigate of Britain's Royal Navy designed by Sir Edward Reed. She was originally to be named HMS Blonde but was renamed following the visit of the Shah of Persia in 1873.

== Building programme ==
The following table gives the build details and purchase cost of the Shah and the other two iron frigates: Inconstant and Raleigh. Standard British practice at that time was for these costs to exclude armament and stores.

Ship	Builder	Engines				Cost according to			
Ship	Builder	Engines	Laid down	Launched	Completed	Brassey's 1887			King
Ship	Builder	Engines	Laid down	Launched	Completed	Hull	Machinery	Total excluding armament	King
Inconstant	Pembroke Dockyard	a John Penn & Son	27 November 1866	12 November 1868	14 August 1869 *	£138,585	£74,739	£213,324	$1,036,756
Raleigh	Chatham Dockyard	Humphrys, Tennant & Co.	8 February 1871	1 March 1873	13 January 1874 *	£147,248	£46,138	£193,386	$939,586
Shah	Portsmouth Dockyard	Ravenhill	7 March 1870	10 September 1873	14 August 1876	£177,912	£57,333	£235,245	$1,119,861

*Date first commissioned.

Her complement was 469 officers and men, 46 boys and 87 marines.

== Armament ==
As of 1888, Shah was armed with two 9-inch rifled muzzle-loading guns, sixteen 7-inch 6½ ton rifled muzzle-loading guns, eight 5-inch breech-loading guns, three quick-firing guns, twelve machine-guns, and four torpedo launchers.

== Service career ==
She was in service for only three years. In 1876, she was deployed as flagship of the Royal Navy's Pacific Station under Admiral de Horsey, relieving HMS Repulse.

On 29 May 1877, in company with the corvette HMS Amethyst, she fought an action near Ilo, Peru, the Battle of Pacocha. This was against the Peruvian armoured single-turret ship Huáscar, which had been taken over by anti-government rebels, and had boarded some British merchant ships.

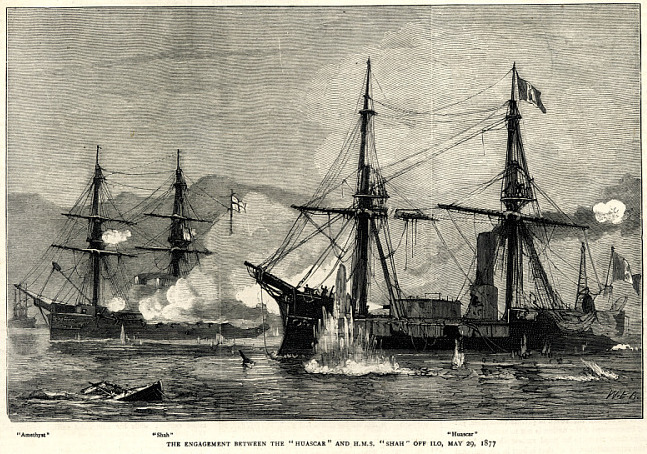
The engagement between HMS Shah (left) and the Huascar off Ilo, 29 May 1877

The armoured Huáscar proved virtually impenetrable to the British guns, but the two unarmoured British ships had to keep clear of the Huáscar’s turret guns. Although Shah was the fastest battleship then afloat, the smaller Huáscar was more maneuverable in the shallow waters. In the course of the action, Shah fired the first torpedo to be used in anger, although it missed – being outrun by Huáscar.

During her time as flagship she also visited Pitcairn Island. On her voyage home in 1879, she called at St. Helena, where news was received of the British defeat at Isandhlwana. Shah was diverted to carry soldiers to Durban in South Africa. She then formed part of a Royal Naval contingent that assisted in the Anglo-Zulu War, before she completed her voyage to Britain.

On 24 October 1879 some of her crew were paid off at Portsmouth and Shah was placed in the fourth division of the Steam Reserve, then joined the North America and West Indies Station at the Royal Naval Dockyard on Ireland Island, Bermuda, to provide accommodation. HMS Malabar took over this task in 1897.

In December 1904, Shah was converted to a coal storage hulk and renamed C.470. The hulk was sold on 19 September 1919. In 1926 the hulk was wrecked, at Bermuda.

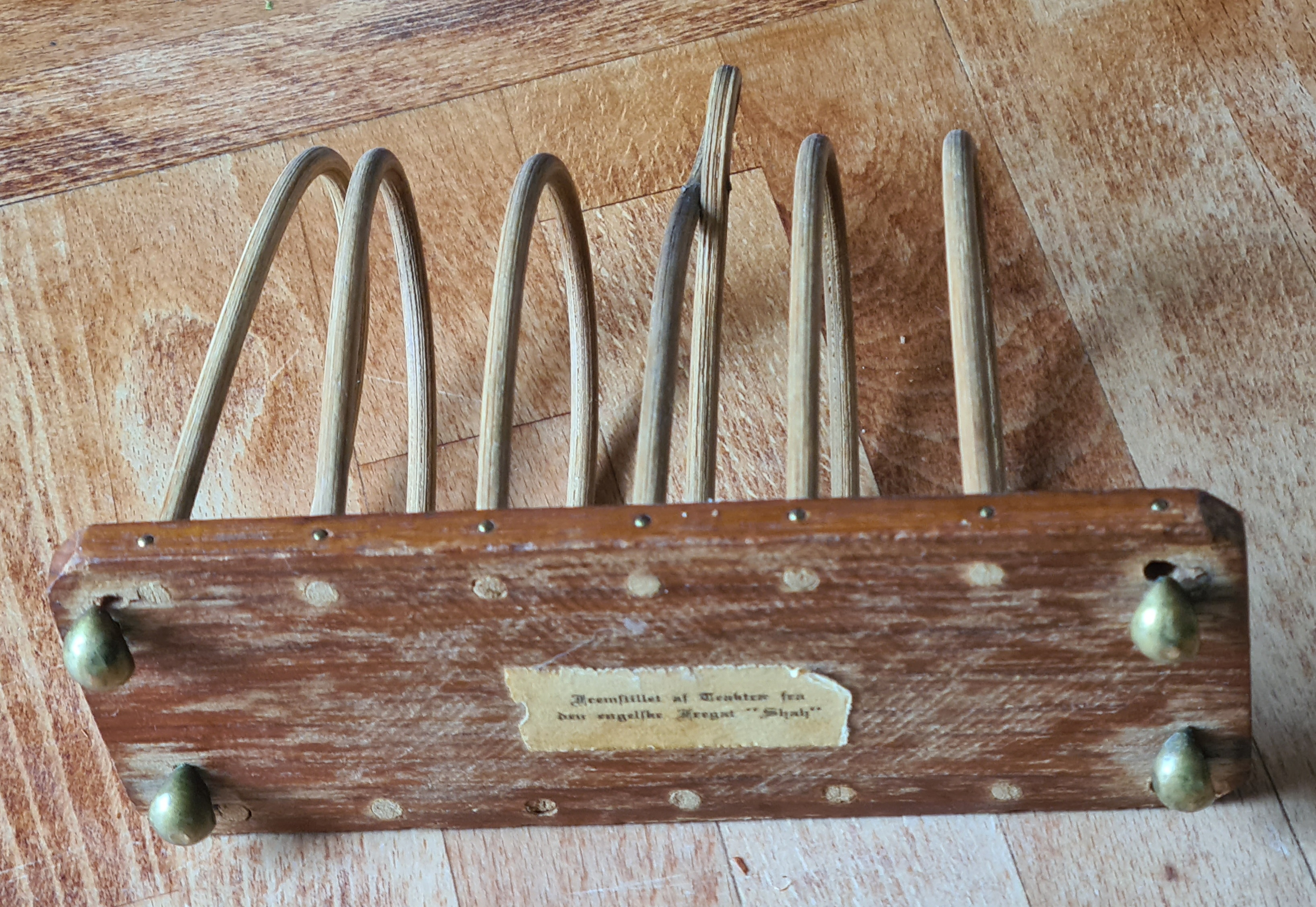
Photo of antique toast rack with a label saying, in Danish gothic script:"Manufactured of teak wood from the English frigate "Shah""

According to some sources (primarily Danish), the ship was eventually sold to Danish salvage company Petersen & Albeck in 1934, towed to Copenhagen, and dismantled there. Part of the teakwood interior was later used as floor planks at the Royal Castle in Gråsten in 1936.

Her masts survive. Being iron, they were deemed to be a lighter, more durable, replacement for the wooden masts of HMS Victory. They were probably fitted to Victory when she was dry docked in 1887, and survive to the present day in her preserved state.

Her stern-plaque, a gift from the Shah of Persia, was restored in 1974 by HMS Malabar (Her Majesty's Naval Base Bermuda, the remnant of the Royal Naval Dockyard). It is on display at the St. George's Historical Society Museum, in the Mitchell House in St. George's Town, Bermuda).

There is a monument to the ship's crew in Victoria Park, Portsmouth.

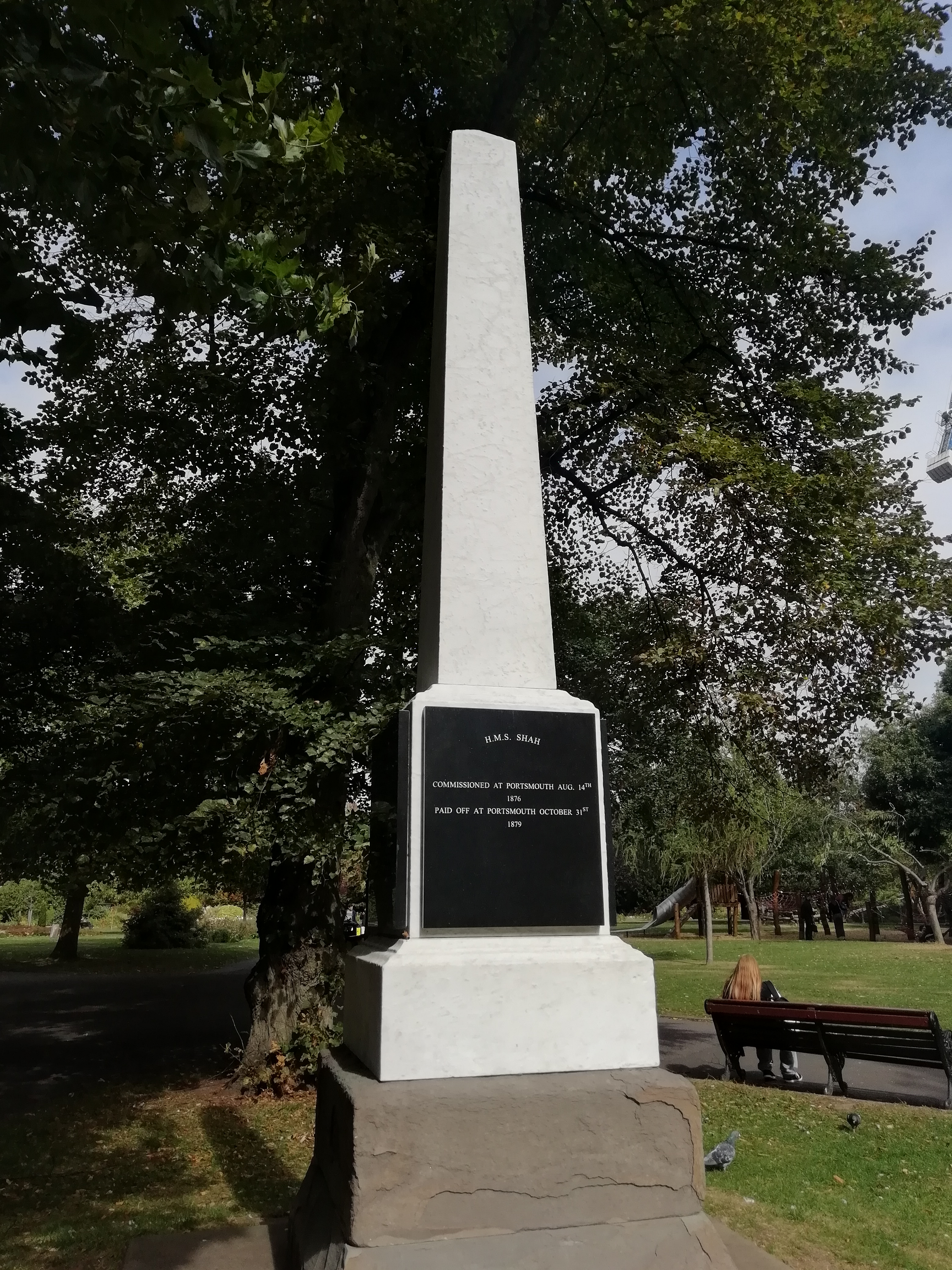
The monument to the ship's crew in Victoria Park, Portsmouth.
