= List of shipwrecks in 1769 =

The List of shipwrecks in 1769 includes some ships sunk, wrecked or otherwise lost during 1769.

table of contents
1769
Jan	Feb	Mar	Apr
May	Jun	Jul	Aug
Sep	Oct	Nov	Dec
Unknown date

== January ==
=== 10 January ===
List of shipwrecks: 10 January 1769
Ship	State	Description
Providence	Great Britain	The ship was driven ashore at King's Lynn, Norfolk. She was on a voyage from King's Lynn to London. She was later refloated and resumed her voyage.

=== 12 January ===
List of shipwrecks: 12 January 1769
Ship	State	Description
St. Antonio	Portugal	The ship was wrecked on the Goodwin Sands, Kent, Great Britain. Her crew were rescued.

=== 15 January ===
List of shipwrecks: 15 January 1769
Ship	State	Description
Royal Charlotte	Great Britain	The ship was driven ashore and wrecked on the west coast of Ireland. She was on a voyage from the Grenades to London.

=== 24 January ===
List of shipwrecks: 24 January 1769
Ship	State	Description
Billy	Great Britain	The ship was driven ashore near Balbriggan, County Dublin, Ireland. She was on a voyage from Liverpool, Lancashire to Dublin.

=== 30 January ===
List of shipwrecks: 30 January 1769
Ship	State	Description
Savage	Great Britain	The ship foundered in the Atlantic Ocean. Her nine crew were rescued by Nancy and William and Mary (both Great Britain). Savage was on a voyage from Charles Town, South Carolina, British America to Madeira.

=== Unknown date ===
List of shipwrecks: Unknown date 1769
Ship	State	Description
Ann & Betty	Great Britain	The ship foundered off Ramsgate, Kent.
Duchess of Leinster	Ireland	The ship foundered in the Irish Sea off Waterford with some loss of life. She was on a voyage from Waterford to Milford, Pembrokeshire, Great Britain.
Earl of Sandwich	Great Britain	The ship was driven ashore and wrecked on the Barbary Coast. She was on a voyage from Málaga, Spain to London.
Industry	Great Britain	The ship ran aground and capsized near "Monpistown", Ireland. She was on a voyage from London to Cork, Ireland and Jamaica.
La Concorde	France	The ship capsized in the Bristol Channel off Aberthaw, Glamorgan. The local inhabitants plundered the wreck, 35 of them are said to have drunk themselves to death on her cargo of brandy and rum.
Le Marquis de Foudoucer	France	The ship was driven ashore and wrecked on the coast of Brittany. She was on a voyage from Newcastle upon Tyne, Northumberland, Great Britain to Bordeaux.
Molly	Great Britain	The ship was run down and sunk off Madeira by Magnacarta (Great Britain).
Nancy	Great Britain	The ship was wrecked on the North Bull, in the Irish Sea off the coast of County Dublin, Ireland. She was on a voyage from Liverpool, Lancashire to London.
Prins Frederick	Denmark	The East Indiaman was driven ashore near Gothenburg, Sweden.
St. Andrew	Ireland	The ship was driven ashore on the coast of County Kerry. She was on a voyage from Porto, Portugal to Cork.
Valasco	Kingdom of Sicily	The ship foundered in the North Sea off Texell, Dutch Republic. She was on a voyage from Messina to Hamburg.
Williams	Great Britain	The ship foundered in the Irish Sea off Belfast, County Antrim. She was on a voyage from Liverpool to Jamaica.

== February ==
=== 10 February ===
List of shipwrecks: 10 February 1769
Ship	State	Description
Britannia	Ireland	The ship was driven ashore and wrecked 4 leagues (12 nautical miles (22 km) from "the Groyne". She was on a voyage from Cork to Cádiz, Spain.
Gustavus Adolphus	Sweden	The ship was lost near Calais, France with the loss of all but one of her crew. She was on a voyage from Gothenburg to Cork, Kingdom of Ireland.
John & Andrew	Ireland	The ship was lost near Calais with the loss of all hands.

=== Unknown date ===
List of shipwrecks: Unknown date 1769
Ship	State	Description
Africa	Great Britain	The ship was lost at Porto, Portugal with the loss of all hands. She was on a voyage from Carolina, British America to Porto.
Eltham	Great Britain	The ship was lost at Porto with the loss of all hands. She was on a voyage from Carolina to Porto.
Labonne Esperanza	Portugal	The ship was lost at Porto. Her crew were rescued. She was on a voyage from Hamburg to Porto.
Liberty	Great Britain	The ship was lost at Liverpool, Lancashire.
Maria	Ireland	The ship foundered in the Irish Sea. Her crew survived. She was on a voyage from Dublin to Liverpool and Galway.
Montrose Herring Buss	Great Britain	The ship was lost off Montrose, Forfarshire.
Prince George	Great Britain	The ship was lost on the coast of Portugal. She was on a voyage from Appledore, Devon to Lisbon Portugal.
St. Michael	Stettin	The ship was driven ashore and wrecked at Arcasson, France. She was on a voyage from Stettin to Bordeaux, France.
Susannah	Ireland	The ship was driven ashore and wrecked on the west coast of Ireland. She was on a voyage from Lisbon, Portugal to Cork.
Swan	Sweden	The ship foundered in the English Channel off Calais, France with the loss of all but her captain. She was on a voyage from Gothenburg to Madeira.

== March ==
=== 9 March ===
List of shipwrecks: 9 March 1769
Ship	State	Description
Three Brothers	Great Britain	The ship was run down in the North Sea off Orfordness, Suffolk with the loss of two of her four crew.

=== 10 March ===
List of shipwrecks: 10 March 1769
Ship	State	Description
Prince George	Great Britain	The ship struck a rock at Douglas, Isle of Man and was wrecked. She was on a voyage from Liverpool, Lancashire to Cork, Ireland.
Two Friends	Great Britain	The ship was wrecked in Trawmore Bay with the loss of nine of her crew. She was on a voyage from London to Waterford, Ireland.

=== 14 March ===
List of shipwrecks: 14 March 1769
Ship	State	Description
Nancy	Ireland	The ship was lost near Calais, France. She was on a voyage from Ireland to Rotterdam, Dutch Republic.

=== 21 March ===
List of shipwrecks: 21 March 1769
Ship	State	Description
Industry	Great Britain	The ship departed from Naples, Kingdom of Sicily for London. No further trace, presumed foundered with the loss of all hands.

=== Unknown date ===
List of shipwrecks: Unknown date 1769
Ship	State	Description
Active	Great Britain	The ship was driven ashore and wrecked at Mogadore, Morocco. Her crew were rescued.
Chance	Great Britain	The ship was driven ashore at Christchurch, Hampshire.
George	Great Britain	The ship was driven ashore in the Orkney Islands.
Harrietta	Great Britain	The ship was driven ashore and wrecked at Mogadore. Her crew were rescued.
Jennett	Great Britain	The ship was driven ashore and wrecked near Portaferry, County Down, Ireland. She was on a voyage from Liverpool, Lancashire to Virginia, British America.
Little Franck	Great Britain	The ship was driven ashore and wrecked near Ferrol, Spain. She was on a voyage from Bristol, Gloucestershire to A Coruña and Cádiz, Spain.
St Antonio de Padeca	Spain	The ship was driven ashore and wrecked on the Spanish coast. She was on a voyage from [Mogadore to Marseille, France.
Thomas & Elizabeth	Great Britain	The ship was reported missing, presumed foundered.

== April ==
14 April

List of shipwrecks: April 1769
Ship	State	Description
Harmosize	Great Britain	The ship was driven out to sea crewless and capsized in the Atlantic Ocean off Porto, Portugal.

=== 20 April ===
List of shipwrecks: 20 April 1769
Ship	State	Description
Porland	Great Britain	The ship was wrecked on the Manchiniel Rocks, Jamaica.

=== 26 April ===
List of shipwrecks: 26 April 1769
Ship	State	Description
Mary	(Kingdom of Great Britain) British America	The schooner struck the Gridiron Rock and foundered. Her crew survived. She was on a voyage from New London, Connecticut, to New York.

=== 28 April ===
List of shipwrecks: 28 April 1769
Ship	State	Description
Three Friends	Great Britain	The ship was lost on this date. Her crew were rescued. She was on a voyage from the Grenades to London.

=== Unknown date ===
List of shipwrecks: Unknown date 1769
Ship	State	Description
Adriana Luppas	Dutch Republic	The ship was driven ashore and wrecked at Rye, Sussex, Great Britain. She was on a voyage from Bordeaux, France to Amsterdam.
Betty	Great Britain	The ship was lost near Great Yarmouth, Norfolk.
John	Great Britain	The ship was lost near Great Yarmouth.
Liberty	Great Britain	The ship ran aground on rocks in the Isles of Scilly. She was refloated and beached. Liberty was on a voyage from King's Lynn, Norfolk to Bristol, Gloucestershire.
Manners	Great Britain	The ship foundered off "St Se Luca". She was on a voyage from San Sebastián to Cádiz, Spain.
Prince Frederick	Great Britain	The whaler was sunk by ice off the coast of Greenland in late April. Her crew were rescued by Jenny (Great Britain).
Ricksenstander	(Sweden) Swedish East India Company	The East Indiaman was lost off the coast of Norway.
Silver Eel	Great Britain	The ship ran aground in Riga Bay.

== May ==
=== 1 May ===
List of shipwrecks: 1 May 1769
Ship	State	Description
Rainbow	Great Britain	The ship foundered in the Atlantic Ocean. Her crew were rescued by Greyhound. She was on a voyage from North Carolina, British America to London.

=== 6 May ===
List of shipwrecks: 6 May 1769
Ship	State	Description
Friendship	(Kingdom of Great Britain) British America	The sloop was wrecked on the Colorados. All on board survived. She was on a voyage from Jamaica to North Carolina.

=== 8 May ===
List of shipwrecks: 8 May 1769
Ship	State	Description
Seaflower	(Kingdom of Great Britain) British America	The sloop was wrecked on Cape Florida. All on board were rescued. She was on a voyage from the Bay of Honduras to Philadelphia, Pennsylvania.

=== 13 May ===
List of shipwrecks: 13 May 1769
Ship	State	Description
Friendship	Great Britain	The ship foundered in the Atlantic Ocean off Land's End, Cornwall with the loss of all but one of her crew. She was on a voyage from London to Cork, Ireland.

=== 17 May ===
List of shipwrecks: 17 May 1769
Ship	State	Description
Nancy	(Kingdom of Great Britain) British America	The ship was wrecked on Heneaga. Her crew were rescued. She was on a voyage from "St Nichola Mole", Hispaniola to Georgia.

=== 29 May ===
List of shipwrecks: 29 May 1769
Ship	State	Description
Sieralion Paquet	Great Britain	The ship was destroyed by fire off the coast of Africa. Her crew were rescued. She was on a voyage from Jamaica to Senegal.

=== Unknown date ===
List of shipwrecks: Unknown date 1769
Ship	State	Description
Advice	Great Britain	The ship caught fire in the North Sea off Hornsey, Yorkshire. She was beached on the Holderness coast but was destroyed. Advice was on a voyage from Memel, Prussia to Great Yarmouth, Norfolk.
Jane	Ireland	The ship foundered in the Atlantic Ocean off the coast of Portugal. She was on a voyage from Kinsale, County Cork to Madeira.
Nancy	Great Britain	The ship was destroyed by fire off Great Orme Head, Caernarfonshire before 16 May. Her crew survived. She was on a voyage from Liverpool, Lancashire to North Carolina, British America.

== June ==
=== 19 June ===
List of shipwrecks: 19 June 1769
Ship	State	Description
Sally	Great Britain	African slave trade: The ship was driven ashore in Grand Roy Bay, Grenades and severely damaged. The slaves were rescued.

=== Unknown date ===
List of shipwrecks: Unknown date 1769
Ship	State	Description
Dartmouth	Great Britain	The ship was driven ashore and wrecked in Rigbury Bay.
Felicity	Danzig	The ship was driven ashore and wrecked on the coast of Jutland. She was on a voyage from Dunkirk, France to Danzig.

== July ==
=== 3 July ===
List of shipwrecks: 3 July 1769
Ship	State	Description
Graham	Great Britain	The ship was wrecked on the Back Reef, off Saint Croix. Her crew were rescued. She was on a voyage from the Grenades to London.

=== 19 July ===
List of shipwrecks: 19 July 1769
Ship	State	Description
HMS Liberty	(Kingdom of Great Britain) Royal Navy	The sloop was set afire and sunk off Goat Island, Rhode Island, British America by a mob of Rhode Islanders.

=== 20 July ===
List of shipwrecks: 20 July 1769
Ship	State	Description
Nancy	Great Britain	The ship foundered off the Saltee Islands, County Wexford, Ireland with the loss of all hands.

=== 21 July ===
List of shipwrecks: 21 July 1769
Ship	State	Description
Britannia	Great Britain	The whaler was sunk by ice in the Greenland Sea. Her 49 crew were rescued by North-star (Great Britain) and another vessel.

=== 26 July ===
List of shipwrecks: 26 July 1769
Ship	State	Description
Edward & Ann	Great Britain	The snow was driven ashore and wrecked at Dominica.
Mary	Ireland	The ship departed from Jamaica for Dublin. No further trace, presumed foundered in the Atlantic Ocean with the loss of all hands.

== August ==
=== 7 August ===
List of shipwrecks: 7 August 1769
Ship	State	Description
Sathe Hambro Arms	Great Britain	The ship was wrecked on the Lizard Rocks, Cornwall. Her crew were rescued. She was on a voyage from Bordeaux, France to Hamburg.

=== Unknown date ===
List of shipwrecks: Unknown date 1769
Ship	State	Description
La Père de Famille	France	The ship foundered in the Baltic Sea.

== September ==
=== 5 September ===
List of shipwrecks: 5 September 1769
Ship	State	Description
Neptune	Great Britain	The ship foundered in the Atlantic Ocean off the coast of North Carolina, British America with the loss of all hands. She was on a voyage from North Carolina to London.

=== 16 September ===
List of shipwrecks: 16 September 1769
Ship	State	Description
Sally	Great Britain	The ship was driven ashore and wrecked at Northam, Devon. Her crew were rescued. She was on a voyage from Porto, Portugal to Bristol, Gloucestershire.

=== 16 September ===
List of shipwrecks: 16 September 1769
Ship	State	Description
Lapomink (Лапоминк)	Imperial Russian Navy	The pink was wrecked on a reef off Skagen, Denmark. Her crew were rescued. She was on a voyage from Kronstadt to the Mediterranean Sea.
Lord Holland	British East India Company	The East Indiaman was lost whilst on a voyage from the Bengal River to Madras, India.

=== 29 September ===
List of shipwrecks: 29 September 1769
Ship	State	Description
Ledbury	Great Britain	The ship was driven ashore and wrecked 15 leagues (45 nautical miles (83 km) north of Cape Florida, British America. Her crew were rescued. She was on a voyage from Jamaica to Bristol, Gloucestershire.

=== Unknown date ===
List of shipwrecks: Unknown date 1769
Ship	State	Description
Bristol	Great Britain	The ship foundered in the North Sea off Margate, Kent.
British King	Great Britain	The ship foundered in the Baltic Sea.
Favourite	Great Britain	The yacht foundered in the Irish Sea off Dungarvan, County Waterford, Ireland. All on board were rescued. She was on a voyage from Bristol, Gloucestershire to Cork, Ireland.
Friendship	Great Britain	The ship was driven ashore and damaged on the coast of Virginia before 29 September. She was later refloated.
L'Adelaide	France	The ship was lost near Havre de Grâce. She was on a voyage from Dieppe to Rouen.
Latham	Great Britain	The ship was driven ashore on the coast of Virginia before 29 September. She was later refloated.
Nancy	(Kingdom of Great Britain) British America	The sloop was driven ashore in a hurricane at York, Virginia.
New Packett	(Kingdom of Great Britain) British America	The ship was driven ashore in a hurricane at Sewell's Point, Virginia.
Porgy	(Kingdom of Great Britain) British America	The sloop was driven ashore and wrecked at Barnegat, New Jersey, before 28 September. Her crew survived. She was on a voyage from Edenton, North Carolina, to New York.
Superbe Countess de Argouge	Spain	The ship was driven ashore and wrecked near Rye, Sussex, Great Britain. She was on a voyage from Alicante to Havre de Grâce, France.
Three Brothers	Great Britain	The ship was driven ashore and wrecked near Northam, Devon. Her crew were rescued. She was on a voyage from Chester, Cheshire to La Rochelle, France.

== October ==
=== 11 October ===
List of shipwrecks: 11 October 1769
Ship	State	Description
Chichagov (Чичагов)	Imperial Russian Navy	The transport ship was wrecked on a reef off Porkkalanniemi in the Gulf of Finland, a lifeboat with seven lives was lost. She was on a voyage from Kronstadt to the Mediterranean Sea.

=== 20 October ===
List of shipwrecks: 20 October 1769
Ship	State	Description
Love Oak	(Kingdom of Great Britain) British America	The sloop was driven ashore and wrecked at Squan Beach, New Jersey.

=== 30 October ===
List of shipwrecks: 30 October 1769
Ship	State	Description
Kronverk (Кронверк)	Imperial Russian Navy	The galiot was torn from her anchor at Baltic Port and wrecked on a reef off Väike-Pakri. Her crew were rescued.

=== Unknown date ===
List of shipwrecks: Unknown date 1769
Ship	State	Description
Apollo	Great Britain	The ship was wrecked on the coast of Portugal. Her crew were rescued. She was on a voyage from London to Venice.
Bland	Great Britain	The ship foundered in the North Sea off Great Yarmouth, Norfolk. She was on a voyage from Newcastle upon Tyne, Northumberland to London.
Dragon	Great Britain	The ship ran aground in the River Thames at Cuckold's Point and was wrecked. She was on a voyage from London to New York, British America.
Drottingham	Sweden	The ship was wrecked on North Ronaldsay, Orkney Islands, Great Britain.
Friendship	Great Britain	The ship was driven ashore and wrecked on the Dutch coast. She was on a voyage from Saint Petersburg, Russia to Genoa and Livorno, Grand Duchy of Tuscany.
Fortune	Great Britain	The ship was driven ashore and wrecked on the Dutch coast. She was on a voyage from Saint Petersburg to Livorno.
John & Jane	Great Britain	The ship foundered in the North Sea off Great Yarmouth. She was on a voyage from Newcastle upon Tyne to London.
Justitia	Sweden	The ship was driven ashore and wrecked on Skagen, Denmark. She was on a voyage from Stockholm to London.
Mercury	Great Britain	The ship was lost near Málaga, Spain. She was on a voyage from Málaga to London.
New Nancy	Great Britain	The ship was destroyed by fire at Nice, France.
Noble Bounty	Great Britain	The ship was wrecked on the Whitings, in the North Sea. She was on a voyage from Saint Petersburg to London.

== November ==
=== 4 November ===
List of shipwrecks: 4 November 1769
Ship	State	Description
Esperance	France	The ship was driven ashore and wrecked at Penzance, Cornwall, Great Britain with the loss of three of her crew. She was on a voyage from the Canary Islands to Dunkirk.

=== 10 November ===
List of shipwrecks: 10 November 1769
Ship	State	Description
Gertrudyda	Russia	The ship was driven ashore and wrecked on Öland, Sweden. She was on a voyage from Saint Petersburg to Ferrol, Spain.

=== 11 November ===
List of shipwrecks: 11 November 1769
Ship	State	Description
Mary Harriott	Great Britain	The ship was driven ashore near Poole, Dorset. She was on a voyage from Antigua to London.

=== 16 November ===
List of shipwrecks: 16 November 1769
Ship	State	Description
Friendship	Great Britain	The brig struck rocks near Land's End, Cornwall and foundered. Her crew were rescued. She was on a voyage from King's Lynn, Norfolk to Liverpool, Lancashire.

=== 25 November ===
List of shipwrecks: 25 November 1769
Ship	State	Description
Bridge-town	Great Britain	The ship ran aground in Lancaster Bay and was abandoned by her crew. She was on a voyage from Barbados to Lancaster, Lancashire.

=== 27 November ===
List of shipwrecks: 27 November 1769
Ship	State	Description
Field	Great Britain	The ship departed from Hull, Yorkshire for London. No further trace, presumed foundered in the North Sea with the loss of all hands.

=== Unknown date ===
List of shipwrecks: Unknown date 1769
Ship	State	Description
Elizabeth	Great Britain	The ship was destroyed by fire at Saint Petersburg, Russia.
Good Intent	Great Britain	The ship was driven ashore at Portland, Dorset. She was on a voyage from "Grunenne", Spain to London.
Fame	Great Britain	The ship was lost whilst on a voyage from London to Saint Petersburg.
Hartly Trader	Great Britain	The ship was wrecked on the Happisburg Sands, Norfolk. She was on a voyage from Hartly, County Durham to London.
Houghton	Great Britain	The ship was driven ashore and wrecked on Gotland, Sweden. She was on a voyage from Saint Petersburg to London.
Jane & Betsy	Great Britain	The ship was in collision with a sloop and foundered. She was on a voyage from "Cape Nicholo Molo" to "Sunberry".
Juffrow Jannetgie	Hamburg	The ship was driven ashore and wrecked near Calais, France. She was on a voyage from Hamburg to Lisbon, Portugal.
Lady Mary	Great Britain	The ship was destroyed by fire at Hamburg.
Molly	Great Britain	The ship was wrecked on the Dutch coast. She was on a voyage from Inverness to Veere, Dutch Republic and Dunkirk, France.

== December ==
=== 4 December ===
List of shipwrecks: 4 December 1769
Ship	State	Description
William	Ireland	The ship was driven ashore and wrecked in Framove Bay.

=== 13 December ===
List of shipwrecks: 13 December 1769
Ship	State	Description
Twee Gebroders	Stettin	The ship was driven ashore and wrecked on the east coast of the Isle of Wight, Great Britain. She was on a voyage from Bordeaux, France to Stettin.

=== 14 December ===
List of shipwrecks: 14 December 1769
Ship	State	Description
Afrique	France	The full-rigged ship foundered in Quiberon Bay.
Duke of York	Great Britain	The ship was abandoned off Dartmouth, Devon. Her crew survived. She was on a voyage from Málaga, Spain to London.

=== 22 December ===
List of shipwrecks: 22 December 1769
Ship	State	Description
Jupiter	Ireland	The brig struck the East Bank, in the Atlantic Ocean off Sandy Hook, New Jersey, British America and sank. She was on a voyage from New York, British America to Dublin.
William	Great Britain	The ship sprang a leak and foundered in the North Sea. Her crew survived.

=== 23 December ===
List of shipwrecks: 23 December 1769
Ship	State	Description
Admiral Hawke	Great Britain	The ship was driven ashore and wrecked on Horse Island, County Galway, Ireland. She was on a voyage from Sint Eustatius to Rotterdam, Dutch Republic.
Lively	Great Britain	The sloop was driven ashore at Great Yarmouth, Norfolk. She was on a voyage from London to Boston, Lincolnshire.
Prince Frederick	Great Britain	The ship was wrecked on the Cockles, in the North Sea off the coast of Norfolk.

=== 25 December ===
List of shipwrecks: 25 December 1769
Ship	State	Description
Nancy	Great Britain	The ship struck the pier at Whitehaven, Cumberland and sank. She was on a voyage from Virginia, British America to Whitehaven.

=== 28 December ===
List of shipwrecks: 28 December 1769
Ship	State	Description
Glasgow	Great Britain	The schooner was in collision with a Dutch Galliot in the English Channel and was abandoned. She was on a voyage from Lisbon, Portugal to Dartmouth, Devon. Glasgow was subsequently discovered off Alderney, Channel Islands and taken in to port there.

=== Unknown date ===
List of shipwrecks: Unknown date 1769
Ship	State	Description
Albion	Great Britain	The ship was wrecked on Wrangeroog, Electorate of Hanover with the loss of two of her crew. She was on a voyage from Hamburg to Cádiz, Spain.
Britannia	Great Britain	Captain Pup's ship was wrecked on the Hammes, in the Baltic Sea.
Britannia	Great Britain	Captain Young's ship was lost near Danzig.
Frederick	Stettin	The ship was driven ashore and wrecked at Swinemünde, Prussia. She was on a voyage from London, Great Britain to Stettin.
Hope	Ireland	The ship was wrecked in Cardigan Bay. She was on a voyage from Jamaica to Dublin.
Jenny	Great Britain	The ship was wrecked on Texel, Dutch Republic. She was on a voyage from British Honduras to Amsterdam, Dutch Republic.
Maria	Russia	The ship was lost on "Coso". She was on a voyage from Saint Petersburg to Lisbon, Portugal.
Neptune	Great Britain	The ship was driven ashore near Narva, Russia. She was on a voyage from London to Saint Petersburg.
Thames	Great Britain	The ship foundered in Cardigan Bay with the loss of three lives. She was on a voyage from Dublin, Ireland to Bristol, Gloucestershire.
HMS Winchelsea	(Kingdom of Great Britain) Royal Navy	The Niger-class frigate struck rocks at Cádiz and was severely damaged. She was taken in to Gibraltar for repairs.

== Unknown date ==
List of shipwrecks: Unknown date 1769
Ship	State	Description
Betsey	Great Britain	The ship was driven ashore and wrecked on the coast of Virginia, British America.
Brothers	Great Britain	The ship was wrecked on a reef off Saint Croix. Her crew were rescued. She was on a voyage from Virginia to Lisbon, Portugal.
Charming Nancy	Great Britain	The ship was wrecked on the coast of North Carolina, British America before 11 October.
Doyard	France	The ship was driven ashore at Calicutt, Kingdom of Mysore. She was burnt by the French after her cargo and stores had been salvaged.
Earl of Chatham	Great Britain	The ship was driven ashore and wrecked on the coast of Maryland, British America. She was on a voyage from Dublin, Ireland to Philadelphia, Pennsylvania, British America.
Elizabeth	Great Britain	The ship was driven ashore on the coast of Virginia. She was later refloated.
Elizabeth	Great Britain	The ship foundered in the Atlantic Ocean. She was on a voyage from Antigua to London.
Fortune	Great Britain	The ship was lost in Maryland, British America.
Freedom	Great Britain	The ship was wrecked on the coast of Carolina.
Industry	Great Britain	The ship was wrecked on the Pallisados, off Kingston, Jamaica. She was on a voyage from Liverpool, Lancashire to Jamaica.
John & Mary	Great Britain	The ship foundered. Her crew were rescued by a French vessel. She was on a voyage from Hull, Yorkshire to Virginia, British America.
King David	Great Britain	The ship sank at Port Royal, Jamaica.
Kitty	Great Britain	The ship was lost at "Terrelland". She was on a voyage from Bristol, Gloucestershire to Newfoundland, British America.
Leviathan	Great Britain	The whaler was sunk by ice in the Greenland Sea.
Lord Holland	British East India Company	The East Indiaman was lost on the Eastern Braces. She was on a voyage from Bengal to Madras, India.
Lyon	Great Britain	The ship was lost at "Auracabesa", on the north coast of Jamaica. She was on a voyage from Jamaica to London.
Mary	Great Britain	The ship was lost near Cape Blanco, Oregon, British America. She was on a voyage from Senegal to London.
Meylor	Great Britain	The ship was lost in the "Caucas's". She was on a voyage from Bristol to Boston, Massachusetts, British America and Jamaica.
Neptune	Great Britain	The ship foundered 150 leagues (450 nautical miles (830 km)) off the coast of Newfoundland. She was on a voyage from Barbados to Milford, Pembrokeshire.
Peggy	Great Britain	The ship sank at Bath, North Carolina, British America. She was on a voyage from Jamaica to Bath.
Prince George	Great Britain	The ship was lost at St Augustine. She was on a voyage from London to St. Augustine.
Priscilla	Great Britain	The ship was wrecked on the coast of Newfoundland. Her crew were rescued. She was on a voyage from Newfoundland to Labrador, British America.
Providence	France	The ship ran onto rocks and was wrecked. She was on a voyage from Livorno, Grand Duchy of Tuscany to Smyrna, Ottoman Empire.
Prudence	Great Britain	The ship foundered in the Atlantic Ocean off the coast of Georgia, British America. She was on a voyage from Cádiz, Spain to Georgia.
Randolph	Great Britain	The ship foundered in the Atlantic Ocean off Cape Henry, Virginia. Her crew were rescued. She was on a voyage from Bristol to Maryland.
Resource	France	The ship was lost on a voyage from Saint-Domingo to Bordeaux.
Richmond	Great Britain	The ship foundered in the Atlantic Ocean. Her crew were rescued. She was on a voyage from Jamaica to Bristol.
Squirrel	Great Britain	The ship foundered at Bonny, Nigeria with the loss of twelve lives.
Windsor	Great Britain	The ship was lost on "Rattuan Island".
