= Molly (1770 ship) =

British merchant ship (1770–1783)

History

Great Britain
- Name: Molly
- Launched: 1770, Liverpool
- Fate: Last listed 1783

General characteristics
- Tons burthen: 200, or 254, or 280 (bm)
- Complement: 26
- Armament: 1779: 18 × 6-pounder gun

Molly was launched at Liverpool in 1770. Between 1777 and 1779 she made three voyages to the British northern whale fishery. Afterwards, she sailed as a West Indiaman. From 1779 she sailed under a letter of marque, and captured one prize. Around the end of 1781 she engaged in a single ship action in which her captain was killed. She was captured but her captor gave her up. She was last listed in 1783.

== Career ==
Molly was first listed in an online volume of Lloyd's Register (LR) in 1776.

Year	Master	Owner	Trade	Source
1776	Jn.Bell; J.Brocklbank	M.Dobson	Virginia–Bristol; Liverpool–Greenland	LR

Molly became a whaler in the British northern whale fishery. She made two voyages to Greenland and one to Davis Strait.

Year	Master	Whales	Tons of oil	Seals
1777		2	30	20
1778		5	65	400
1780		8	120	1,800

Year	Master	Owner	Trade	Source
1779	Brocklebank; J.Jordan	M.Dobson	Liverpool; Davis Strait	LR
1780	J.Jordan	J.Myton	Liverpool–Antigua	LR

New owners returned Molly to merchant trade. Captain John Jordan acquired a letter of marque on 7 August 1779. In March 1780 Lloyd's List reported that Molly, Jordan, master, had arrived at Antigua with a prize. From Jamaica Molly sailed to Georgia, and Charleston, South Carolina.

Lloyd's List reported in January 1782 that Molly, Jordain (or Jordan), master had been on her way to Liverpool from Jamaica when she encountered the privateer Terror of England, of 22 guns, Captain Kelly, off the Tuskar Rock, Ireland. After an engagement of three hours Molly struck. Captain Jordain and four of his crew had been killed, and several men had been wounded. However, a gale came up and the prize crew, whom Kelly had put on board Molly, not knowing what to do with her, delivered her up to her own crew, who had been left on board. They then took her into Greenock. (Note: Terror of England was also known as Anti-Briton. HMS Stag captured Anti-Briton on 4 January 1782. The Royal Navy took her into service as HMS Trimmer.) From Greenock her crew took her to Liverpool.

Year	Master	Owner	Trade	Source
1782	J.Jordan; M'Koon	J.Myton	Liverpool–Antigua	LR; good repairs 1779, & 1782

== Fate ==
Molly was last listed in 1783.
