= Joseph Deane (Royal Navy officer) =

British Naval officer

Commodore Joseph Deane
- Born: c.1730
- Died: 12 January 1780
- Military career
- Allegiance: United Kingdom
- Branch: Royal Navy
- Rank: Commodore
- Commands: HMS Eurus; HMS Lowestoffe; HMS Pearl; HMS Mermaid; HMS Stag; HMS Royal Oak; HMS Ruby
- Conflicts: Seven Years' War

Commodore Joseph Deane (c. 1730 – 12 January 1780) was a senior Royal Navy officer who served as Commander-in-Chief, North American Station from September 1766 to November 1766.

== Naval career ==
Deane joined the Royal Navy in 1746. Promoted to captain on 17 October 1758, he was given command of the sixth-rate HMS Eurus. He went on to command the sixth-rate HMS Lowestoffe and saw action during the siege of Quebec in 1760. He went on to command the fifth-rate HMS Pearl and then the sixth-rate HMS Mermaid before briefly serving as Commander-in-Chief, North American Station from September 1766 to November 1766. After that, he commanded, successively, the fifth-rate HMS Stag, the third-rate HMS Royal Oak and, finally, the third-rate HMS Ruby and took part in the action of 7 March 1779.

Deane died at Port Royal in Jamaica, on 12 January 1780.
