= HMS Trimmer =

British sloop or brig (1782–1801)

History

France
- Name: Anti-Briton (or Terror of England)
- Builder: Dunkirk (probably)
- Launched: c.1781
- Captured: 1782

Great Britain
- Name: HMS Trimmer
- Acquired: January 1782
- Fate: Sold 1801

General characteristics
- Tons burthen: Privateer: 250 (French; "of load"); HMS:27525/94 (bm)
- Length: 83 ft 9 1/2 in (25.5 m) (overall); 64 ft 1 5/8 in (19.5 m) (keel)
- Beam: 24 ft 4 7/8 in (7.4 m)
- Depth of hold: 10 ft 9 3/4 in (3.3 m)
- Sail plan: Cutter, Sloop, then Brig
- Complement: Privateer: Commissioned:162; Capture: 104; HMS: 110 men
- Armament: Privateer: 14 × 6-pounder guns + 10 swivel guns; 22 × 6-pounder guns (reported at capture); HMS: Sloop: 14 × 6-pounder guns + 10 × 1/2-pounder swivel guns; Fire ship: 8 × 18-pounder carronades

HMS Trimmer was the French privateer cutter Anti-Briton (or Terror of England), which HMS Stag captured in January 1782 and which the Royal Navy took into service. Early in the French Revolutionary Wars Trimmer captured a privateer. Though she never sailed again after December 1793, the Navy converted her to a temporary fire ship in 1798. The Admiralty sold her in 1801.

== Capture ==
Anti-Briton was commissioned at Dunkirk. From 1781 she was under the command of Captain John Kelly, who went under the alias of Jean Grumlé.

Kelly captured the cutter Hope in August 1781.

Lloyd's List reported in January 1782 that Molly, Jordain, master had been on her way to Liverpool from Jamaica when she encountered the privateer Terror of England, of 22 guns, off the Tuskar Rock, Ireland. After an engagement of three hours Molly struck. Captain Jordain and four more of his crew had been killed, and several men had been wounded. However, a gale came up and Terror of England gave Molly up. Molly then sailed into Greenock, and on to Liverpool.

Terror of England had captured the yacht Tyrone, Roach, master, and ransomed her for 200 guineas. Tyrnone had been on her way from Killibegs to Waterford, and came into Dublin.

On 4 January 1782, Terror of England captured several vessels: Elizabeth, Mollineaux master, which had been sailing from Plymouth to Liverpool, a schooner that had been sailing from London to Cork, and several other vessels that Terror of London had ransomed. Stag came up and set off in pursuit of the privateer, capturing her later that day.

On 4 January 1782, Stag, under the command of Captain Robert Palliser Cooper, captured Anti-Briton, which was under the command of John Kelly. Cooper had received intelligence that a privateer cutter had taken several vessels in the channel between Ireland and Britain. As soon as the weather permitted, Cooper set sail and was fortunate enough to encounter and capture her. Cooper reported that he took great pleasure in capturing her as she was quite new and had done a great deal of mischief.

Cooper brought Anti-Briton into Dublin. There it was discovered that she had been fitted out in Dunkirk and that almost all her crew were English or Irish. These men were incarcerated at Newgate Prison as traitors. Kelly was a native of Rush, County Dublin, but held a commission as a lieutenant in the French navy. He had reportedly captured some 170 vessels that he had destroyed or ransomed for large prices. Kelly would ensure that he received the ransom money by holding sufficient hostages until the bills drawn for the ransom were paid.) (When Stag captured Anti-Briton, there were reportedly twelve hostages aboard representing some £60,000 in ransom money.) Kelly had been a smuggler; in later life he ended up a porter on the quay at Bordeaux.)

Although there is a great deal of ambiguity about how many crew were abroad Anti-Briton, ultimately the authorities determined that 36 men were French. These the British treated as prisoners-of-war and incarcerated at Kilkenny. Sixty men the authorities deemed traitors. However, the men never came to trial as Stag had delivered them to Dublin, not Britain, and legal opinion was that an Admiralty court there would not have jurisdiction, and a British court would not convict them. The men were released in 1783 after the end of the war with France.

Before her capture, Anti-Briton had captured Sally, Durham, master, which had been sailing from Leverpool to Cork. Sally was forced on shore at Barnstable. Her cargo was mostly saved but it was feared that Sally herself was destroyed.

== Career ==
The Admiralty registered Anti-Briton as a sloop on 7 May. However, the Navy fitted and rigged her at Plymouth as a brig between May and September.

Commander John Hutt commissioned Trimmer in July. From February 1783 she was under the command of Commander William Titcher until April, when she was paid off. She was recommissioned in September, and then in May 1784 came under the command of John Luck.

In February 1785 Commander Charles Tyler recommissioned her. Under Tyler she was employed in the Bristol Channel in the suppression of smuggling. In 1787 Lieutenant George M'Kinley went in pursuit of a smuggler in Trimmer's jolly boat. He was gone for 30 hours because of a heavy gale and all but lost.

Commander Mark Robinson became her captain in March 1789. Commander Francis Fayerman recommissioned Trimmer in October 1791.

In 1793 Trimmer was on the Jersey station. There she captured one of the first armed French vessels flying the tri-colour flag. On 5 April Trimmer and the brig Liberty, under the command of George M'Kinley, captured the French privateer Courier.

Commander Charles Craven took command in May, for the Channel. However, she was paid-off shortly afterwards because she was in a defective state. In December she was laid up at Sheerness.

Between June and July 1798 fitted Trimmer as a fireship, but then laid her up again. Commander Edward Parker recommissioned her in March 1801, for the North Sea, but the Admiralty cancelled the deployment and ordered her sold.

== Fate ==
On 30 June 1801, the Navy offered the "Fire Brig" Trimmer for sale at Sheerness. She was sold on 18 July for £710.
