= Action of 30 September 1780 =

1780 naval battle

- Part of the American Revolutionary War and the Anglo-French War (1778–1783)
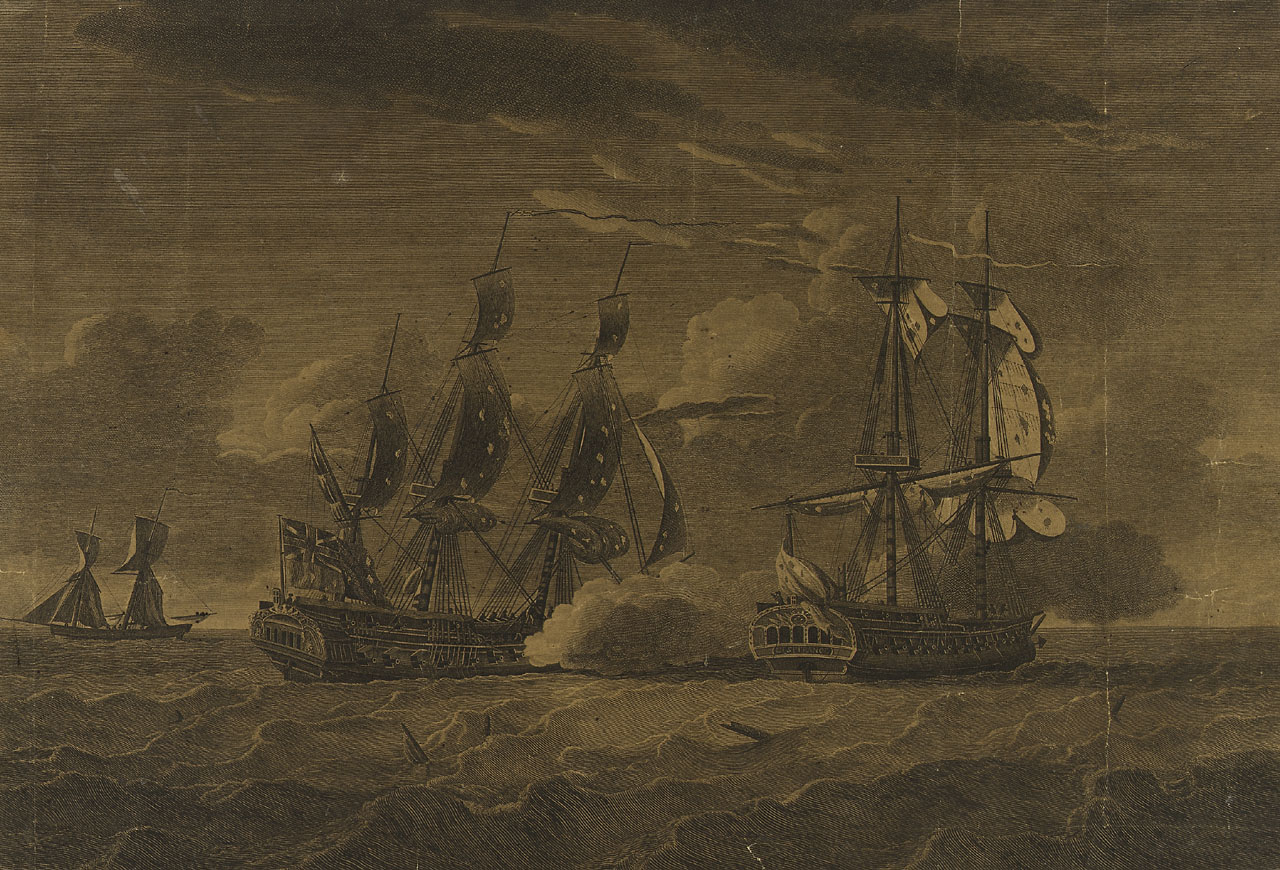
- The Pearl taking Esperance - 30 Sep 1780
Date	30 September 1780
Location	off the Bermudas
Result	British victory

Belligerents
Great Britain	France

Commanders and leaders
George Montagu	Unknown

Strength
1 Frigate HMS Pearl	1 frigate Espérance

Casualties and losses
Total Losses: 16; 6 killed; 10 wounded	Total Losses: 200; 20 killed; 24 wounded; 156 captured; 1 Ship: 1 frigate captured

The action of 30 September 1780 was a minor naval engagement off the Bermudas, where HMS Pearl captured Espérance, a French frigate of 32 guns launched in 1779.

HMS Pearl under the command of George Montagu was sent out to North America, and on 30 September 1780, soon encountered a frigate off the Bermudas. As Pearl closed Montagu cleared for action and engaged close for two hours, then maintained a running fight for a further two hours and more when the frigate struck.

The prize turned out to be the French frigate Espérance of about 850 tons of thirty-two guns consisting of twelve- and six-pounders, nearly 200 men and with a valuable cargo heading from Cape Francois to Bordeaux. Espérance lost 20 killed and 24 wounded as well as the crew and marines captured, while Pearl's losses were six killed and ten wounded. The captured French frigate was put into Royal Naval service and renamed HMS Clinton.
