= HMS Santa Monica =

Spanish frigate, in service 1777–1782

- U.S. National Register of Historic Places
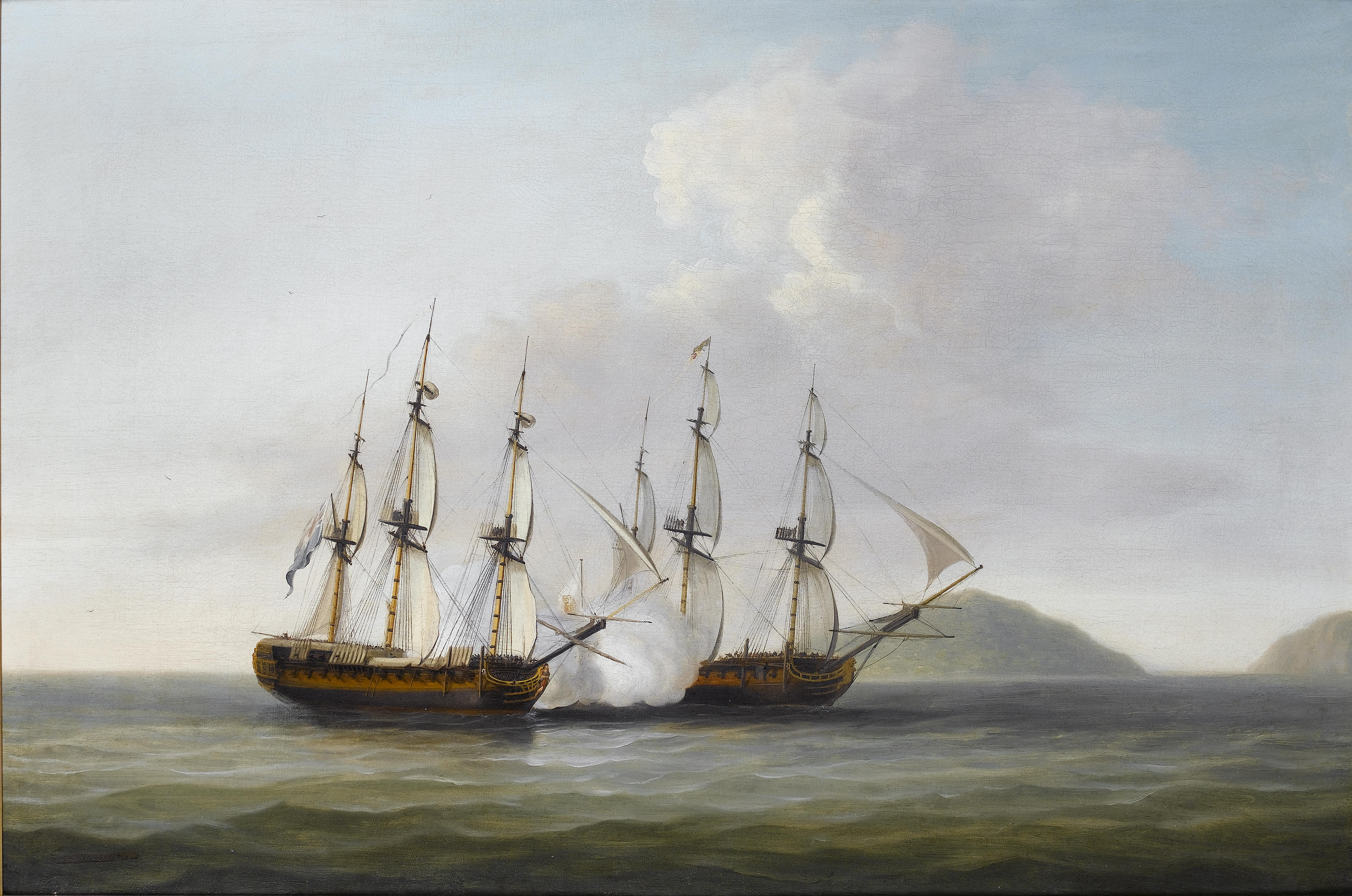
- Pearl engaging Santa Ammonica off the Azores
- Location: Address restricted
- Nearest city: Coral Bay, U.S. Virgin Islands
- Area: less than one acre
- NRHP reference No.: 78003163
- Added to NRHP: February 17, 1978

HMS Santa Monica was a Spanish frigate which battled the British HMS Pearl in 1778, off the Azores. It was built in 1777 in Cartagena, Spain and launched as Santa Ammonica. It was taken as a prize in the 1778 battle, commissioned into the Royal Navy and renamed in 1779, but a few years later was grounded off Tortola in the British Virgin Islands, and was broken up. Its wreck was later found in what is now the territory of the U.S. Virgin Islands.

== History ==
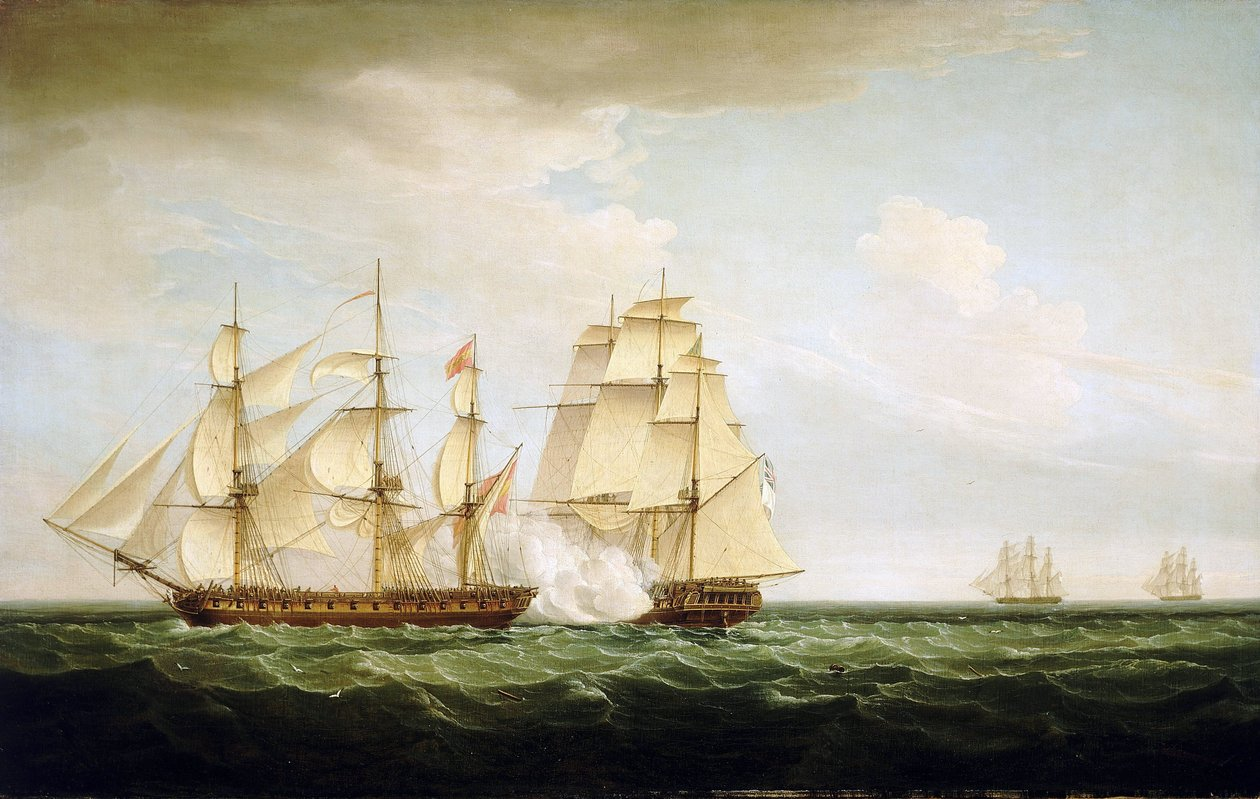
Santa Ammonica and HMS Pearl in combat

On 14 September 1779, HMS Pearl engaged the 28-gun Santa Monica off the Azores. At 6:00 that morning, the Spanish frigate was spotted to the north-west and was brought to action after a 3 1/2-hour chase. The Santa Monica surrendered after a two-hour engagement, having 38 men killed and 45 wounded. Pearl had 12 killed and 19 wounded. The Santa Monica was a larger frigate than Pearl, at 956 long tons (971 t) burden, but not as well armed; she was rerated as a 36-gun when taken into British service.

There was a mutiny aboard the ship on 16 July 1781. It was grounded off Tortola on 1 April 1782.

The shipwreck was found in the general area of Coral Bay, off Saint John in what is now the U.S. Virgin Islands. It was listed on the National Register of Historic Places in 1978. Its specific location is not disclosed.
