= HMS Pearl (1762) =

Royal Navy frigate, in service 1762–1832

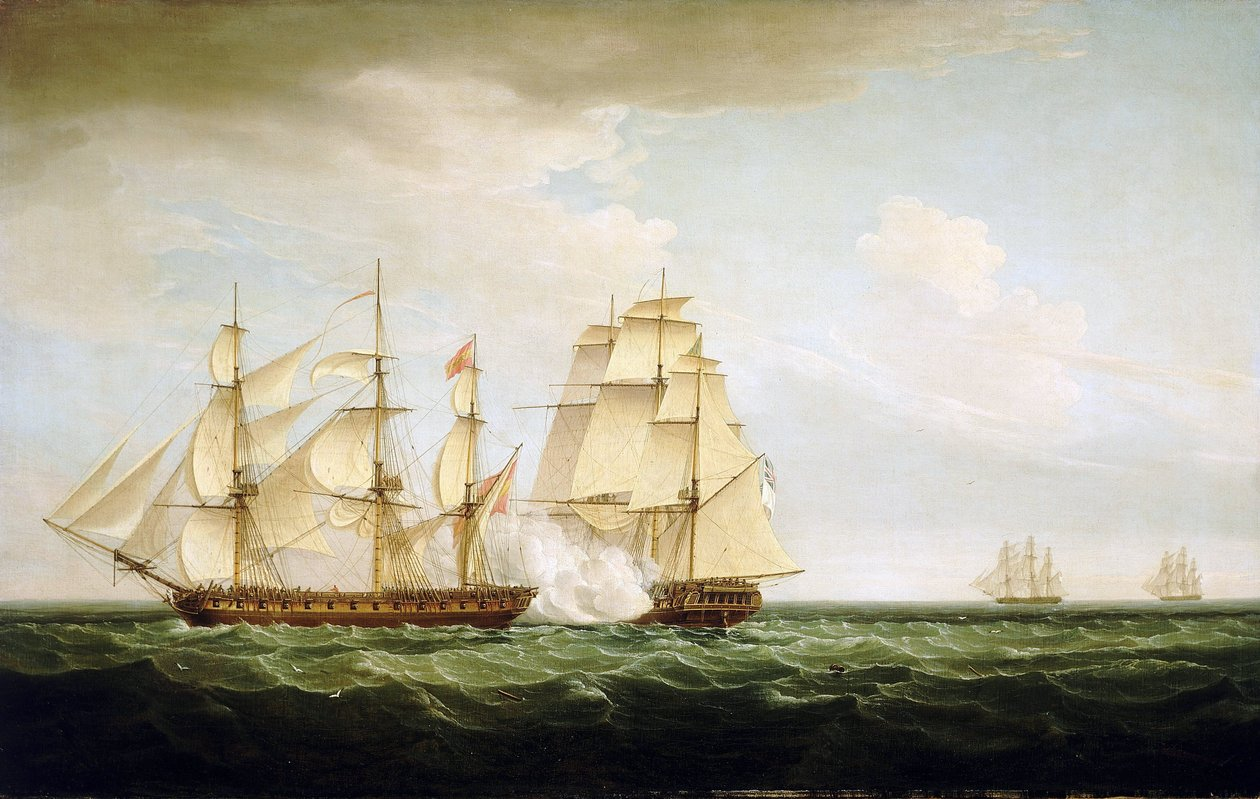
- Pearl (right) battling the Santa Monica off the Azores in 1779

History

Great Britain
- Name: HMS Pearl
- Ordered: 24 March 1761
- Cost: £16,573.5.4d
- Laid down: 6 May 1761
- Launched: 27 March 1762
- Completed: 14 May 1762
- Commissioned: April 1762
- Renamed: Protheé (March 1825)
- Fate: Sold 1832

General characteristics
- Class & type: Niger-class fifth-rate frigate
- Tons burthen: 683 16/94 (bm)
- Length: 125 feet 0 1/2 inch (38.1 m) (gun deck); 103 feet 4 3/8 inches (31.5 m) (keel)
- Beam: 35 feet 3 inches (10.7 m)
- Depth of hold: 12 feet (3.7 m)
- Propulsion: Sails
- Sail plan: Full-rigged ship
- Complement: 220
- Armament: Gundeck: 26 × 12-pounder guns; Quarterdeck: 4 × 6-pounder guns; Forecastle: 2 × 6-pounder guns

HMS Pearl was a fifth-rate, 32-gun British Royal Navy frigate of the Niger-class. Launched at Chatham Dockyard in 1762, she served in British North America until January 1773, when she sailed to England for repairs. Returning to North America in March 1776, to fight in the American Revolutionary War, Pearl escorted the transports which landed troops in Kip's Bay that September. Much of the following year was spent on the Delaware River where she took part in the Battle of Red Bank in October. Towards the end of 1777, Pearl joined Vice-Admiral Richard Howe's fleet in Narragansett Bay and was still there when the French fleet arrived and began an attack on British positions. Both fleets were forced to retire due to bad weather and the action was inconclusive. Pearl was then despatched to keep an eye on the French fleet, which had been driven into Boston.

Pearl was part of the British fleet that captured the island of St Lucia from the French in December 1778, and was chosen to carry news of the victory to England, capturing the 28-gun Spanish frigate Santa Monica off the Azores on her return journey. She joined Vice-Admiral Marriot Arbuthnot's squadron in July 1780, capturing the 28-gun French frigate Esperance while stationed off Bermuda in September; the following March she took part in the First Battle of Virginia Capes, where she had responsibility for relaying signals. Pearl returned to England in 1783, where she underwent extensive repairs and did not serve again until 1786, when she was recommissioned for the Mediterranean.

Taken out of service in 1792, she was recalled in February 1793, when hostilities resumed between Britain and France. On her return to the American continent, she narrowly escaped capture by a French squadron anchored between the Îles de Los and was forced to put into Sierra Leone for repairs following the engagement. In 1799, Pearl joined Vice-Admiral George Elphinstone's fleet in the Mediterranean where she took part in the Battle of Alexandria in 1801. In 1802, she sailed to Portsmouth where she served as a storeship for sailors' clothes and then a receiving ship. She was renamed Protheé in March 1825 and eventually sold in 1832.

== Construction and armament ==
Pearl was a British fifth-rate, 32-gun, Niger-class frigate designed for the Royal Navy by naval architect, Thomas Slade. Eleven were eventually built, all requested during the Seven Years' War, and Pearl was the seventh ship in her class to be finished. She was ordered, with HMS Emerald, on 24 March 1761, and her keel was laid down at Chatham Dockyard on 6 May. When launched on 27 March 1762, Pearl was 125 feet 0 1/2 inch (38.1 m) along the gun deck, 103 ft 4 3/8 in (31.5 m) at the keel, had a beam of 35 ft 3 in (10.7 m) and a depth in the hold of 12 ft (3.7 m). She was 683 16/94 tons burthen and by the time she had been completed, on 14 May 1762, she had cost the Admiralty £16,573.5.4d. Niger-class frigates, were full-rigged ships, carrying 32 guns: a main battery of twenty-six 12-pounder (5.4 kg) guns on the upper deck, four 6-pounder (2.7 kg) guns on the quarterdeck and two on the forecastle. When fully manned, they carried a complement of 220.

== Service ==
Pearl was first commissioned in April 1762, under Captain Joseph Deane, who took her to the Downs, to be fitted-out. In March 1763 she was recommissioned under Captain Charles Saxton and on 22 May 1764, she left for Newfoundland in British America. Pearl served there under captains Patrick Drummond and, subsequently, John Elphinston, until she was paid off in December 1768. She was recommissioned the following month under John Leveson-Gower, who was succeeded by Sir Basil Keith in November.

From April 1770, Pearl spent time on and off the Newfoundland station, under first John Ruthven and then James Bremer. Towards the end of 1772, she sailed for Portsmouth where she underwent repairs and a refit, at a total cost of £9,008.15.11d. The combined works took until February 1776. John O'Hara, who had been in command since November 1775, was replaced by Thomas Wilkinson in March 1776, shortly after completion.

=== American Revolutionary War ===
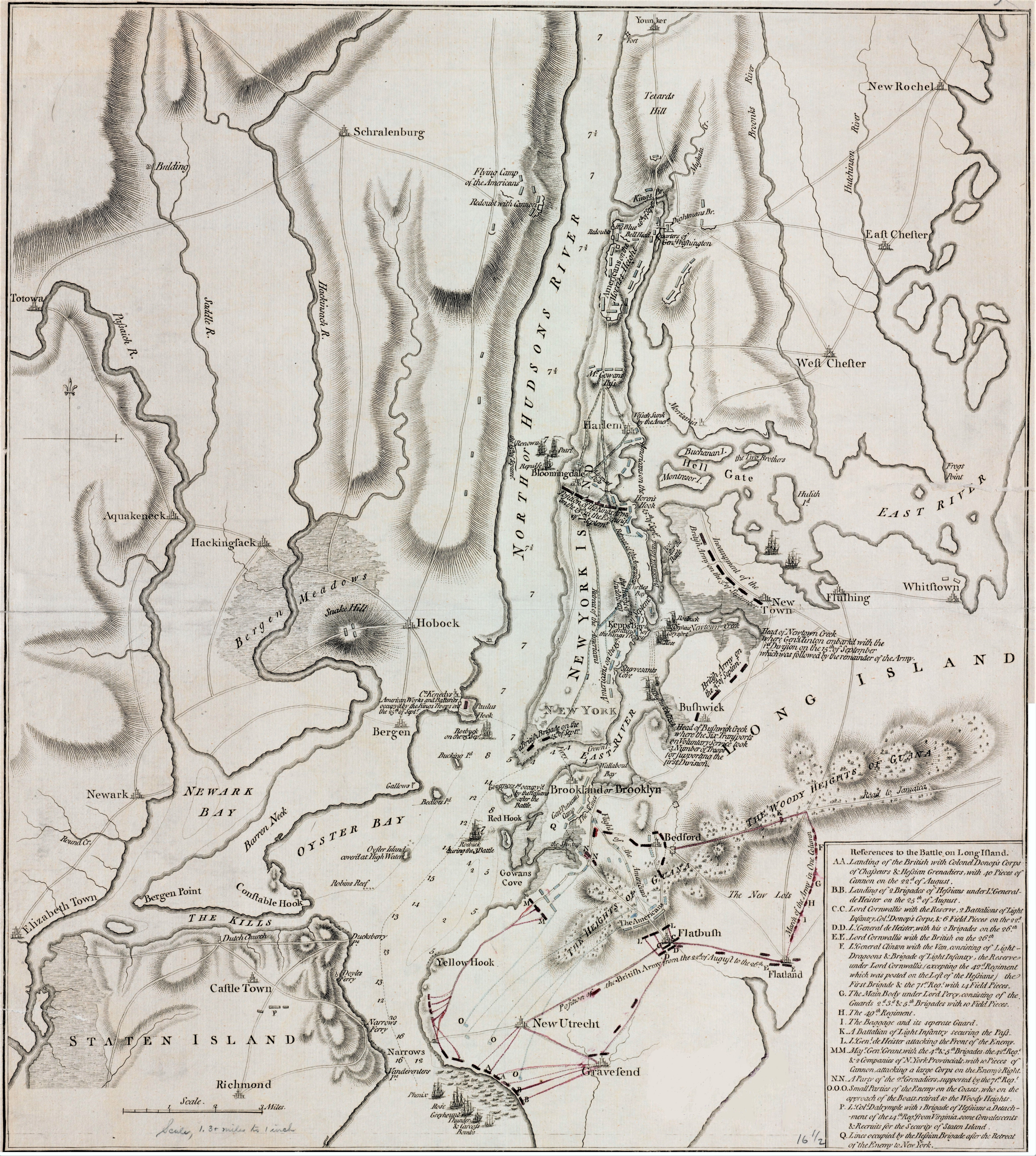
British chart showing the attack on New York in 1776. Pearl is depicted creating a diversion in the North River, opposite Bloomingdale, with HMS Repulse and Renown.

Wilkinson returned Pearl to North America in April to fight in the American Revolutionary War, bringing a convoy of troopships from Ireland to Quebec, with the sixth-rate frigate HMS Carysfort, before escorting transports along the Hudson River to take part in the landings at Kip's Bay, New York, in September. On the evening of 13 September, the British began moving into position. Six troopships with three fifth-rates, HMS Roebuck, HMS Phoenix and HMS Orpheus, and the smaller Carysfort, moved up the East River and anchored in Bushwick Creek, opposite Kip's Bay. At the same time, Pearl, the fourth-rate, 50-gun HMS Renown and fifth-rate, 32-gun HMS Repulse, were sent up the North River as a diversion. On the day of the landings, 15 September, the small squadron passed the enemy batteries without incident and anchored at Bloomingdale, 6 miles (9.7 km) upstream of New York. The following night the Americans sent fireships but these caused no damage other than the inconvenience to the British of having to move their ships.

Towards the end of the year, Pearl joined a small squadron under Captain Andrew Snape Hamond on a cruise along the coast to South Carolina and, on 20 December, captured the USS Lexington, a 16-gun sloop of war of the Continental Navy. A strong gale prevented the removal of prisoners and the allocation of an adequate prize crew, and with only eight British sailors on board, she was retaken that night. Sometime later, Pearl detained a French vessel, carrying arms and ammunition. Wilkinson saw this as proof that the French were aiding the Americans but as there had been no formal declaration of war at that point, he was obliged to let her go.

From South Carolina Pearl sailed to Antigua where she arrived on 27 January 1777 to await careening and refitting. While this was being carried out, on 13 February, Wilkinson died from disease and was replaced by George Elphinstone. Work was completed in mid-March, after long delays caused by a shortage of skilled labour, and she returned to the American coast, leaving English Harbour on 18 March, in the company of Roebuck and the two 20-gun post ships HMS Perseus and HMS Camilla.

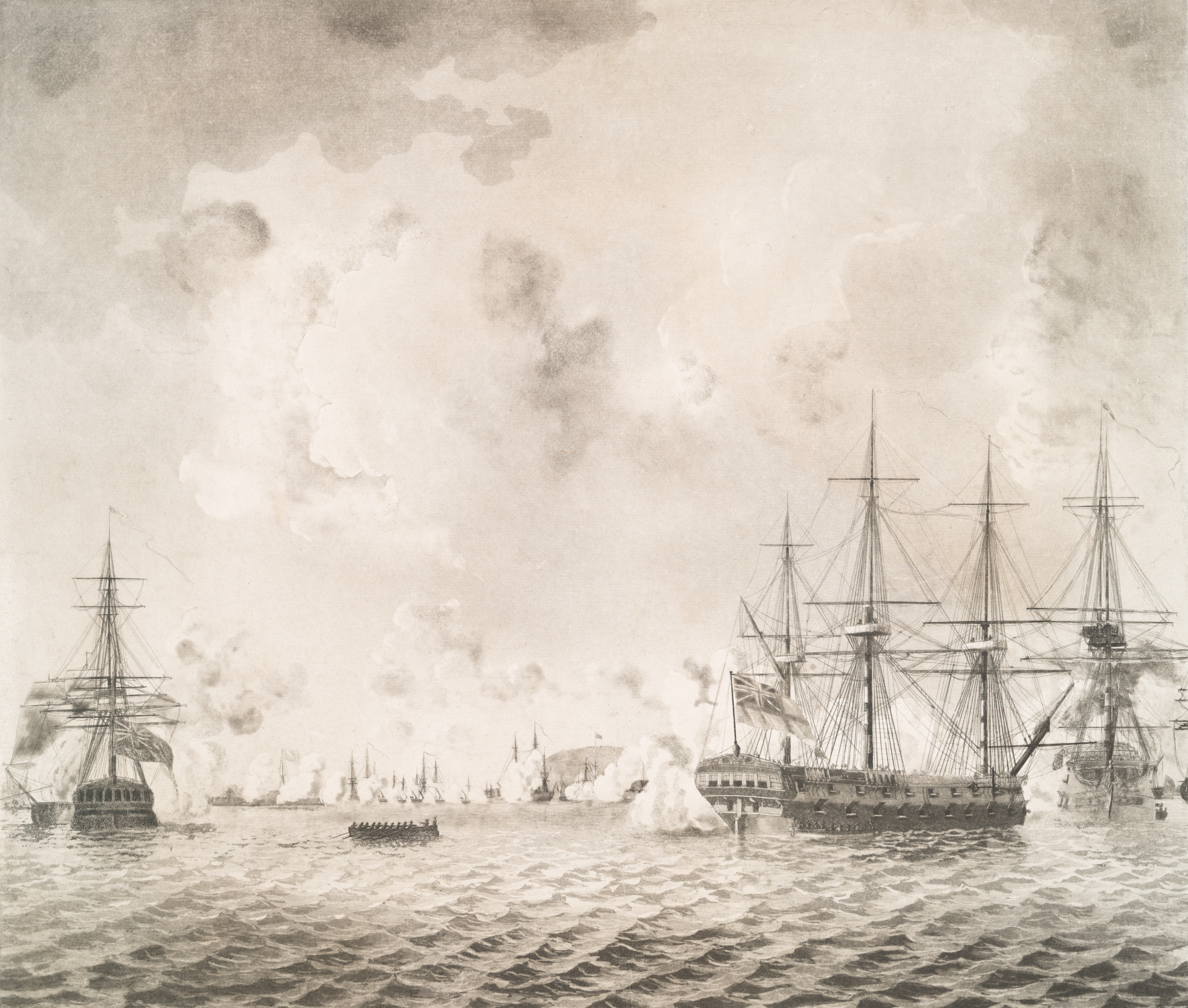
Pearl (second from left) at the action off Mud Fort in the River Delaware, 15 November 1777

Despite the time spent in port, Pearl managed more than a dozen captures between January and May 1777, including Batchelor on 21 March (suspected of piracy because of its armament) and a whaleboat from Lewes, Delaware, on 29 May that was thought to be spying. Another change in command occurred in 1777 when John Linzee was appointed as captain (Note: Winfield's book gives the date of this change as December 1777, however, copies of Linzee's journal, reprinted in Morgan's Naval Documents of the American Revolution indicate he was in command at the capture of Mosquito in July.) and on 6 July, boats from Pearl and Camilla captured and burnt the schooner, USS Mosquito in a cutting out expedition. The American vessel of six cannon and four swivel guns was moored in a tributary of the Delaware River when, at 03:00, the British sailors boarded without opposition. The only two people guarding her, the master and the gunner, were taken off and she was set alight.

Pearl was anchored off Bombay Hook, Delaware, on 21 July. At 15:00, a fleet of twelve Continental Navy vessels, under the command of Charles Alexander in the frigate USS Delaware, came in sight. A signal gun was fired to warn her tender, which was ashore collecting supplies, then the ship weighed anchor and sailed off but ran aground on Cross Ledge. The tender was captured along with a fortnight's worth of provisions but Pearl managed to get free and escape downriver. At 11:00 the following morning she spotted Camilla some 6 nautical miles (11 km; 6.9 mi) away. Pearl requested she join her and the two ships anchored to await the enemy fleet. On the morning of 23 July, an American vessel came under a flag of truce but by this time the sixth-rate, HMS Liverpool, had sailed into view. At 06:00 the next day, the American fleet arrived and made a second attempt to discuss terms but were dismissed. The three British frigates cleared for action, the Americans scattered and were pursued up the river but not caught; the British losing sight of their quarry and giving up the chase the next day.

==== Assault on Philadelphia ====
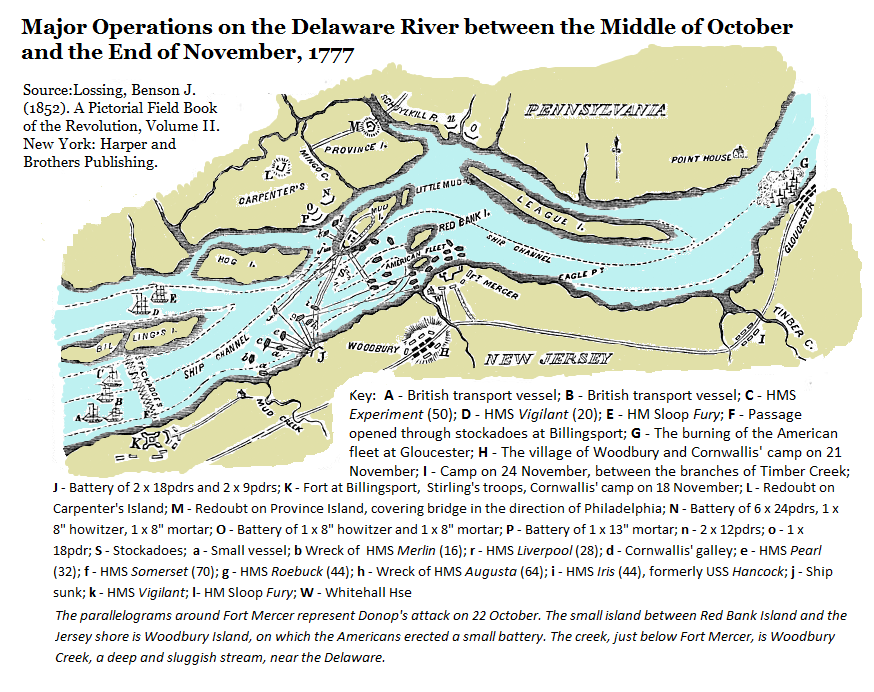
British chart showing American defences on the Delaware in 1777. Pearl is shown attacking a battery opposite Hog Island before travelling up the river to engage the American fleet.

When American land forces were defeated at the Battle of Brandywine near Chadds Ford, Pennsylvania, and retreated to Philadelphia that September, Pearl was part of a squadron tasked with opening up the Delaware River, which had been heavily protected with redoubts and sunken obstructions to prevent its navigation. Led by Vice-Admiral Richard Howe in Roebuck, the small force worked its way upstream to Billingsport, New Jersey, where a large earthworks and gun battery protected a channel, blocked with a submerged cheval de frise – large wooden frames, filled with stones and fronting iron-tipped spears. Stationed along the river were floating batteries and gunboats, and 3 miles (4.8 km) further upstream, another set of obstacles had been sunk between Fort Mifflin and Fort Mercer. On 22 September, Pearl, Roebuck, Liverpool and the third-rate, 64-gun HMS Augusta, forced a passage in order to support an attack on Red Bank by British troops. Joined later by the fourth-rate, 50-gun HMS Isis and the 16-gun sloop HMS Merlin, the British vessels were subjected to heavy fire when they engaged the American flotilla and batteries. Augusta ran aground and caught fire, and Merlin blew up; Pearl and the remaining force broke off the attack and returned to Billingsport.

British troops entered Philadelphia on 26 September but a supply route was needed and control of the river was therefore crucial. In November, Province Island was captured and Howe began erecting batteries. A hulk was converted to a floating gun platform and with the assistance of Pearl, Roebuck and Liverpool, a six-day bombardment of Fort Mifflin forced the Americans out. Two days later Fort Mercer fell and the British vessels pushed upriver in pursuit of the American fleet which was later scuttled at Gloucester, Massachusetts.

At the end of the year, Howe's fleet removed to Narragansett Bay where Pearl and her compatriots patrolled the coast and preyed on enemy shipping. On 18 March, 1778 boats from Pearl and HMS Camilla captured Pennsylvania Navy armed boat named Fame (A.K.A. No. 71) up a creek above Reedy Point. The next day her boats captured an armed boat and a yawl. At dawn on 25 July 1778, a large vessel was seen off Sandy Hook in Lower New York Bay and Pearl, anchored nearby, was sent in pursuit. The stranger turned out to be the Industry, an American frigate of 26 guns operating under a letter of marque. Pearl came up with her at 09:00 and the privateer fought for an hour and a half before striking her colours.

Pearl was present when the French fleet from Toulon arrived at the end of July, and was at the ensuing engagement in August. The French force, under Comte d'Estaing, entered the bay on 29 July and attacked British positions on Conanicut and Goat Island the following day. On 8 August, 4,000 French soldiers and sailors were landed to reinforce the 10,000 American troops who had just crossed from the mainland to lay siege to the British garrison on Rhode Island.

Howe positioned his fleet off Point Judith on 9 August. D'Estaing had superior numbers and guns, so sailed out the next morning, fearing that the British might soon be reinforced. A violent gale scattered the fleets and ended several days of manoeuvring, during which both commanders sought the weather gage. When the British were eventually reunited, it was evident that repairs were required and they sailed for New York City on 15 August. D'Estaing's ships had fared even worse and were forced to retire to Boston. Howe left for England in September 1778, and Pearl joined a squadron under Rear-Admiral John Byron, watching the French fleet in Boston harbour.

==== Operations in the West Indies ====
D'Estaing's fleet of 15 ships-of-the-line left Boston on 3 November 1778, two days after Byron's squadron had been blown off station and driven into Newport, Rhode Island by more bad weather. Pearl was despatched to carry news of the escape to the Commander-in-Chief of the Leeward Islands Station, Rear-Admiral Samuel Barrington; Byron was to follow two to three days later if he was unable to locate the French. Not knowing Barrington's precise whereabouts, Pearl at first sailed to Antigua, arriving on 4 December, before immediately heading for Barbados. En route, she stopped a Dutch vessel which had encountered a French warship out of Boston on the previous night. From the information received, Linzee deduced that d'Estaing's fleet was somewhere near Barbados and arrived there himself on 13 December.

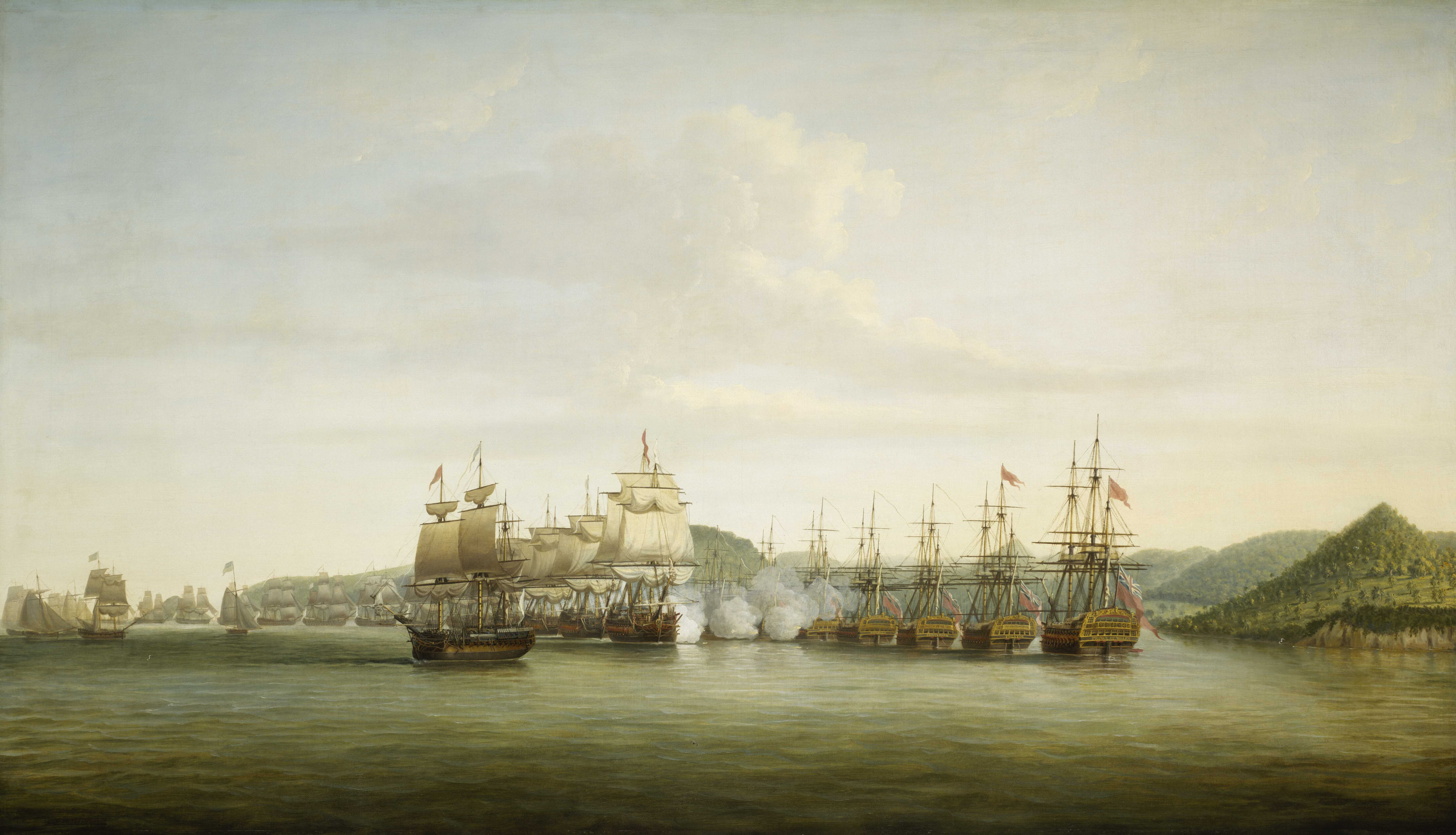
D'Estaing's fleet attacks Barrington's at St Lucia.

With the arrival of winter and the associated impracticalities of keeping a fleet at sea during bad weather, the British switched their attention to the Leeward Islands, where the French had already been active; capturing the Island of Dominica in September. On 10 December, Commodore William Hotham with a convoy of 5,000 troops and a small escort, arrived at Barbados, giving the British numerical superiority in the area. Joining with Barrington's ships, the escort squadron comprised two 64-gun and three 50-gun ships-of-the-line, a bomb vessel, and two frigates, Pearl and the 36-gun HMS Venus. On 13 December, the convoy landed troops on the French colony of St Lucia. The troops quickly captured the batteries on the west side of the island, and with the support of these batteries, Barrington's much smaller fleet was twice able to repulse d'Estaing's when it arrived the following day. Although the French were able to land 7,000 troops of their own, British command of the high ground meant they were beaten off. The French troops were re-embarked, and when d'Estaing's fleet left on 29 December, the island surrendered. (Note: Clowes has Pearl as one of the two frigates (the other being the 36-gun Venus) in Hotham's fleet at St Lucia. This fleet left New York on 4 November however and the London Gazette has Pearl with Byron until 17 November. The Gazette also records that Pearl did not arrive in Barbados until the day after the fleet had left.)

News of the capture of St Lucia was carried back to England in Pearl. Captain Alexander Graeme took command of the ship on 9 January 1779 and she left Antigua on 16 February in the company of the 74-gun third-rate, HMS Sultan with despatches from both Byron and Barrington, and arrived at Spithead on 22 March. She was then paid off, sheathed in copper, and refitted at Plymouth. Graeme left Pearl on 13 April. She served for a short while in the Channel before returning to the North American Station under Captain George Montagu.

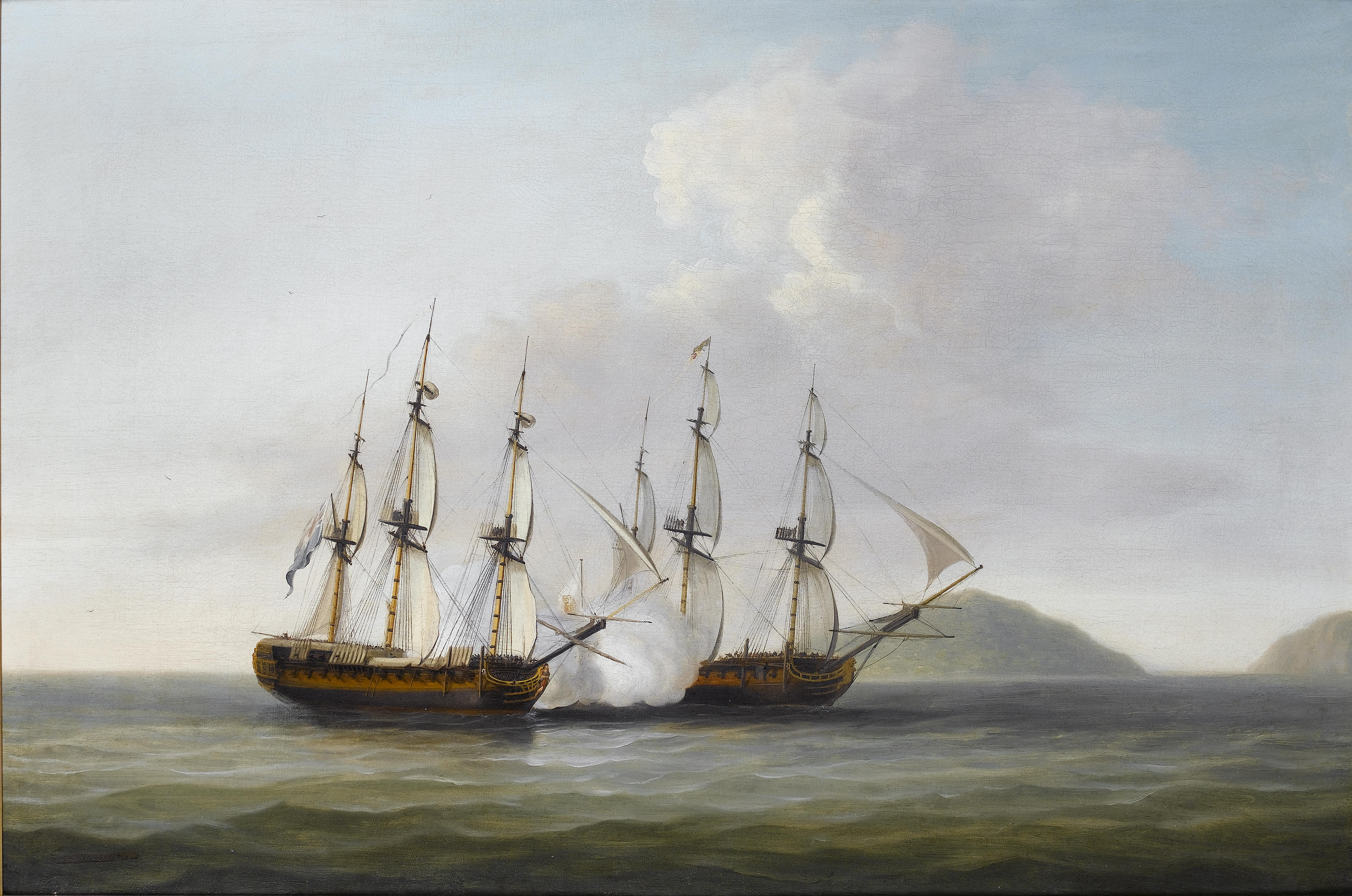
Pearl engages the Santa Monica in the action of 14 September 1779.

On her return to the American continent in September, Pearl spent two days resupplying at Fayal in the Azores, leaving on 13 September. At 06:00 the following morning, a Spanish frigate was spotted to the north-west and was brought to action after a three-and-half-hour chase. The 28-gun Santa Monica surrendered after a two-hour engagement, having 38 men killed and 45 wounded. Pearl had 12 killed and 19 wounded. The Santa Monica was the larger vessel at 956 tons burthen, but not as well armed; she was re-rated as a 36-gun when taken into British service.

On 8 January 1780, Pearl took part in an attack on a Spanish convoy from Caracas comprising 22 ships, including seven men of war; the entire convoy was taken. A portion of the captured ships were carrying naval supplies and these were despatched to England with Pearl and 64-gun third-rate, HMS America as escorts, while the remaining prizes were sent to Gibraltar. The ship later returned to North America, spending some time at Halifax, Nova Scotia before leaving, with the 74-gun third-rate, HMS Robust, to join Vice-Admiral Marriot Arbuthnot's squadron off Sandy Hook on 3 July 1780, where preparations were being made to repel an expected attack by the French fleet.

Arbuthnot set sail on 13 July, after being reinforced with six ships-of-the-line under Rear-Admiral Thomas Graves. Hearing that the French fleet had put into Narragansett Bay on 17 July, Arbuthnot's squadron arrived on 22 July to find the French encamped on Rose Island and their ships strung out between there and Conanicut Island. Arbuthnot sent orders for transports from New York, in case the British Army thought an attack on the island necessary, then anchored his squadron off Block Island. After re-provisioning on 6 August, the British squadron stationed itself off Newport, then retired to Gardiner's Island on 9 August, leaving on 17 August for an eight-day cruise between the Nantucket Shoals and the east end of Long Island, returning to lie off Martha's Vineyard.

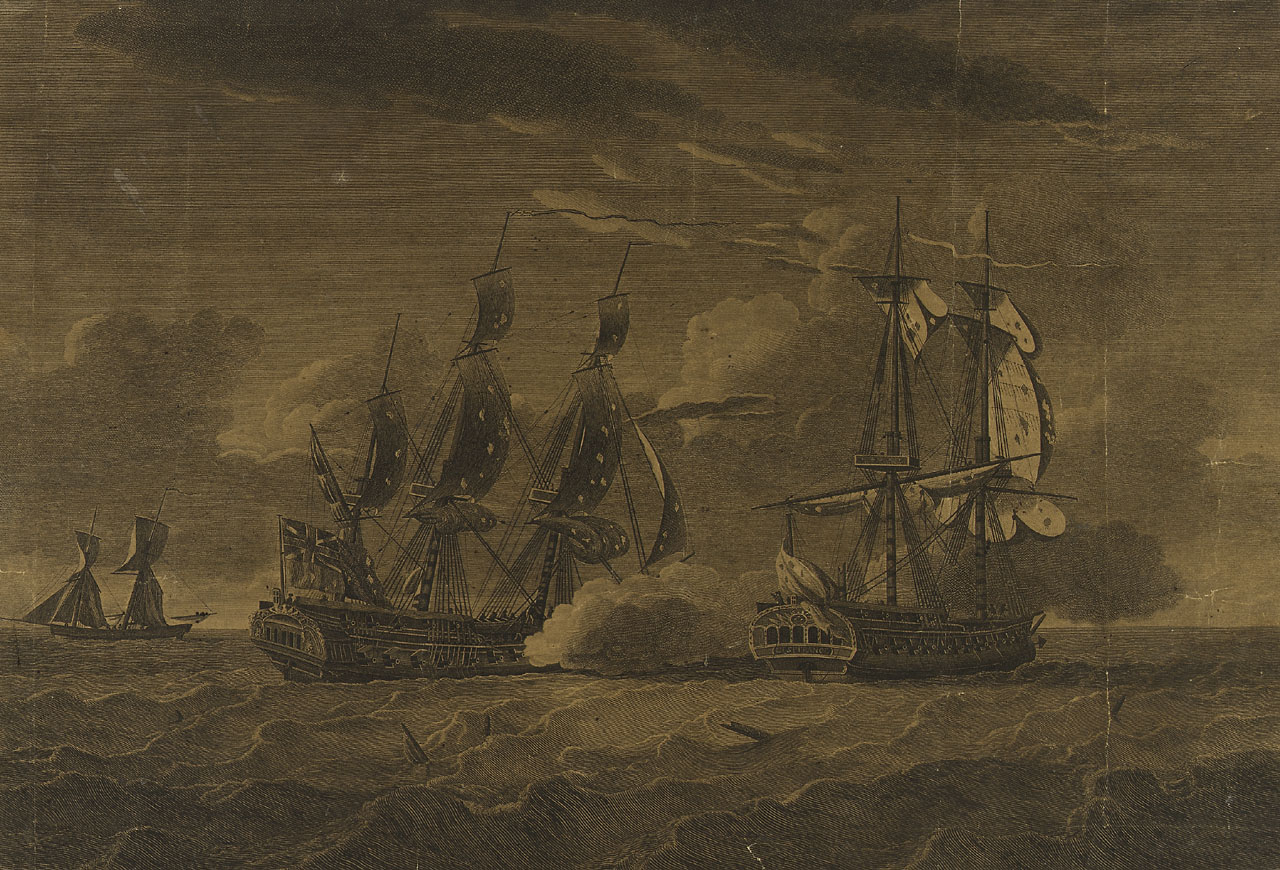
Pearl engages Esperance in an action on 30 September 1780.

Pearl fell in with the 28-gun French frigate, Esperance off Bermuda on 30 September 1780. After a two-hour fight, Esperance broke off but was pursued and the two ships engaged in a running battle for a further two and a half hours, after which the French ship was forced to capitulate. She had 20 men killed and 24 wounded; Pearl had 6 men killed and 10 wounded.

==== Battle of Virginia Capes ====
In January 1781, Arbuthnot had a French squadron blockaded in Newport. On 23 January, his ships were caught in a squall off the east end of Long Island which resulted in the loss of one 74-gun third-rate ship, HMS Culloden, and the dismasting of another, HMS Bedford. America was blown out to sea but turned up two weeks later undamaged. Pearl escaped relatively unharmed. The French, however, now had a numerical advantage; they broke out on 8 February and captured the British fifth-rate, HMS Romulus. The British brought Bedford back into service by salvaging the masts from the wreck of the Culloden and set sail to look for the French on 9 March. The two forces discovered each other at 06:00 on 16 March in a thick fog some 40 nautical miles (74 km; 46 mi) off Cape Henry. The British caught up by 13:00 and found themselves to windward of the French after some manoeuvring, where the increasingly strong winds and high seas prevented them from opening their lower gunports. The French, downwind, leaned away from their opponents; they were not so disadvantaged and could bring more and larger guns to bear. The fleets engaged by 14:30 with the heaviest action upon the leading three ships of the British vanguard. The three ships were so badly damaged that the British were unable to pursue when the French broke off and turned towards Newport, so they put into Chesapeake Bay. The British casualties were 30 killed, 73 wounded, while the French had 72 killed and 112 wounded. Pearl was too small to be in the line of battle and had stood off with the other frigates, incurring no loss or damage. She had responsibility for relaying signals during the battle.

Arbuthnot's ships were seaworthy by 24 March and he set sail for Delaware, where he assumed that the French fleet had gone, but contrary winds forced him to return. Two days later, Pearl was sent out with the 28-gun sixth-rate, HMS Iris to search for the French but again was unable to locate them.

Pearl remained in American waters until July 1782. She continued to harass enemy shipping, taking the French privateer Singe, a large polacca, on 10 July 1781 and the 8-gun American Senegal of 50 tons burthen, on 19 August, plus three merchant vessels before the year was out. Two schooners and three brigs were captured in 1782, before Pearl paid off and returned to England for substantial repairs. The cost of repairs amounted to £19,267.13.8d and took until June 1784, after which she was laid up at Deptford. (Note: Winfield's book gives the year of these repairs as 1884 but this is a typographical error because 1786 is the following year in Winfield's timeline and Pearl was sold in 1825.)

==== Prizes taken during the American Revolutionary War ====
Vessels captured or destroyed during the American Revolution for which Pearl's crew received full or partial credit (Note: Does not include prizes taken in fleet actions.)
20 December 1776	Lexington	American	Naval sloop (16 guns)	Captured then retaken
3 January 1777	Betsey	American	Sloop	Captured
6 January 1777	Little John	American	Slaver	Captured
21 March 1777	Batchelor	American	Privateer	Captured
24 March 1777	Speedwell	American	Schooner	Captured
24 March 1777	Anna Maria	American	Merchant	Captured
6 April 1777	Willing Maid	American	Brig	Sunk
6 April 1777	Harmony	Not recorded	Brig	Captured
6 April 1777	Mary	French	Merchant	Captured
21 April 1777	Not recorded	Not recorded	Sloop	Captured
29 May 1777	Chance	American	Sloop	Captured
29 May 1777	Not recorded	American	Whaler	Captured
29 May 1777	Not recorded	Not recorded	Merchant	Captured
6 July 1777	Mosquito	American	Naval schooner	Cut out and burnt
Before 20 April 1778	Maria	Not recorded	Schooner	Captured
Before 8 July 1778	Read	American	Schooner	Captured
Before 8 July 1778	Welcome	Not recorded	Schooner	Captured
Before 8 July 1778	Kitty	Not recorded	Brig	Captured
Before 8 July 1778	Friendship	Not recorded	Schooner	Captured
25 July 1778	Industry	American	Frigate (26 guns)	Captured
6 November 1778	Humbird	Not recorded	Schooner	Captured
6 November 1778	Betsey	Not recorded	Sloop	Captured
December 1778	Nancy	Not recorded	Schooner	Captured
14 September 1779	Santa Monica	Spanish	Frigate (26 guns)	Captured
29 January 1780	Roy Midas	French	Snow	Captured
30 September 1780	Esperance	French	Frigate (28 guns)	Captured
13 June 1781	Singe	French	Polacca	Captured
19 August 1781	Senegal	American	Privateer (8 guns)	Captured
20 August – 31 October 1781	Long Splice	Not recorded	Merchant (30 tons burthen)	Captured
20 August – 31 October 1781	Eleanor	Not recorded	Merchant (70 tons burthen)	Captured
20 August – 31 October 1781	Friendship	Not recorded	Merchant (100 tons burthen)	Captured
26 April 1782	Eliza	Not recorded	Schooner	Captured
26 April 1782	Salmon	Not recorded	Schooner	Captured
Before July 1782	Fox	American	Brig	Captured
Before July 1782	Dandy	American	Brig	Captured
Before July 1782	Charming Sally	American	Brig	Captured

=== Mediterranean service and the outbreak of war ===
Between July and December 1786, Pearl underwent a refit. She sailed to the Mediterranean on 22 March 1787, returning home in 1789 to be recommissioned under Captain George Courtnay. She rejoined the Mediterranean fleet in May 1790. Sometime in 1792, the ship was taken out of service but was recalled the following year when France declared war on Britain once more. She was fitted out at Plymouth between June and August at a cost of £7,615, before sailing to the Irish Station under Captain Michael de Courcy where she served until November 1795. Following a small repair at Plymouth, costing £9,686, Captain Samuel James Ballard took command in February 1796.

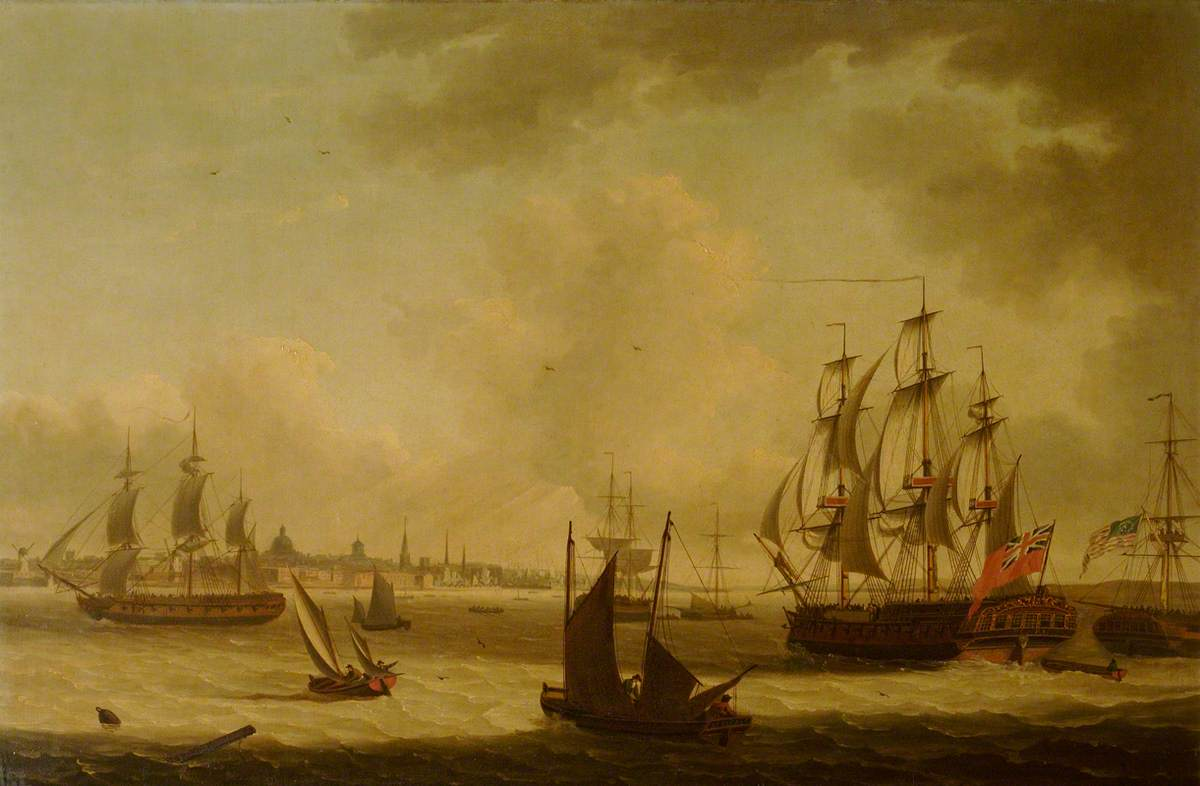
The Pearl off Liverpool, 1796 by John Thomas Serres

Aided by the 36-gun fifth-rate, HMS Flora, Pearl captured the 24-gun privateer, Incroyable, on 14 April 1797. Reputed to be a very fast sailing vessel, Incroyable left her home port of Bordeaux on 2 April. She had yet to take a prize, when, on the morning of 11 April, she was seen and chased by Pearl. The next day, the two ships were some 200 nmi (370 km; 230 mi) off the west coast of Spain, when Flora appeared, forcing Incroyable to haul to windward. On 13 April, Incroyable became becalmed, allowing the British frigates to catch up, which they did at 23:45. After receiving a single broadside, the French privateer surrendered.

In March 1798, Pearl sailed for the Leeward Islands via West Africa, where, on 24 April, she escaped from two French frigates. While passing through the Îles de Los, an archipelago off the coast of Guinea, she discovered an enemy squadron comprising four large ships at anchor and a brig under sail. As she approached, one of the ships hoisted a French flag and opened fire. Forced to run between two frigates, Pearl engaged both as she passed then hove to, continuing to fire for a further hour before making off with one, or possibly both frigates in pursuit. The chase continued through the night and all through the following day before Pearl managed to escape, arriving at Sierra Leone on 27 April, where she was inspected for damage. She had been holed in several places, although all were above the waterline; her fore-topgallant yard and foreyard had been shot away and a number of lower shrouds and other rigging had been cut through. In addition, two of her carronades had been dismounted, causing the death of one man. (Note: William James claims the ship that chased Pearl was the 36-gun Régénérée, while Onésime-Joachim Troude, in his third volume of "Batailles navales de la France", states the 40-gun Vertu was the ship in pursuit. Clowes' book says that both the frigates chased Pearl.) Pearl eventually arrived in the West Indies, capturing the 10-gun privateer, Scocvola, in October and the 12-gun privateer, Independence, in December, both off the coast of Antigua.

On 22 October 1799, Pearl was sent to the Mediterranean where she spent much of the following 12 months attempting to disrupt enemy trade by attacking the numerous merchant vessels along the European coast. Spain had re-entered the war as an ally of France in 1796 and in January 1800, the British frigate took both a Spanish brig, and a French brig with accompanying settee. Then on 9 February, near Narbonne, she drove ashore and destroyed a large Genoese polacca of 14 guns. The crew escaped as did the small convoy of settees that were being escorted. While off Marseille, Pearl captured a Genoese brig and settee on 28 April, two more Genoese settees on 2 and 3 May and, with the fourth-rate HMS Hindostan, a Ragusan brig on 20 May.

Cruising off Alicante in June and July, Pearl captured three more Ragusan ships, a French settee, two Spanish settees and a xebec. Then, on 20 July, the crew of Pearl took part in a cutting out expedition which resulted in the capture of two xebecs and six settees. Shortly after the action a storm blew up and three of the prizes had to be scuttled though their cargo was removed first. She captured four more settees on 31 August, destroyed a further two on 11 October and on the same day, she took a French ketch on its way to Nice. Two Genoese ships were taken on 14 October and three French settees the following day while a fourth was burnt.

Pearl received a share of the prize money for a transport, wrecked off Minorca and salvaged on 20 October with the aid of the 18-gun sloop HMS Lutine, the 8-gun bomb vessel HMS Strombolo, and the 6-gun tender HMS Alexander. On 31 October, with Lutine, Strombolo, the 20-gun corvette HMS Bonne Citoyenne and the 12-gun polacca, Transfer, she took another transport from Port Mahon.

==== Alexandria ====
In January 1801, a large force of 16,000 troops and more than 100 vessels was assembled in Malta in preparation for an invasion of French-occupied Ottoman Egypt. The escorting fleet, to which Pearl was attached, was commanded by her former captain, Elphinstone, by this time a vice-admiral. The expedition arrived in Aboukir Bay on 1 February 1801. The subsequent Battle of Alexandria was brought to a successful conclusion when the French surrendered on 2 September, following a protracted siege. In 1850, a general service medal with the clasp "Egypt" was retrospectively awarded to the surviving members of Pearl's crew, for their part in the campaign.

While cruising with the 32-gun fifth-rate HMS Santa Teresa on 28 February, Pearl took a Genoese merchant ship on its way home, laden with goods from Marseille. The two British frigates later managed to save some cargo from a sinking Genoese tartan and a French tartan that had been scuttled. Both ships were out of Marseille. On 20 March, a French ship bound for Alexandria was intercepted and captured by Pearl, Santa Teresa and the 40-gun heavy frigate, HMS Minerve. With the 16-gun sloop HMS Peterel and 14-gun brig HMS Victorieuese, Pearl seized a Genoese ship carrying arms to Alexandria on 29 April. The three British ships took a French aviso, also going to Alexandria, on the same day. On 1 July, Pearl took a small privateer.

==== Siege of Porto Ferrajo ====
Pearl was in Commodore John Borlase Warren's squadron when, on 1 August, it was called to the island of Elba to relieve the British garrison at Porto Ferrajo, which had been under siege since the beginning of May. The arrival of the British ships caused the two French frigates guarding the port to retreat to Leghorn in the Kingdom of Etruria, a French client state. Warren then initiated a blockade of the island. The two escaped frigates were later brought to action on 2 September when the fifth rates, HMS Pomone, HMS Phoenix and Minerve recaptured Succès and destroyed Bravoure after she had run aground. (Note: Succès was previously HMS Success, captured off Gibraltar by Ganteaume's force on 9 February 1801.)

The next day at 14:30, Phoenix, Pomone and Pearl were cruising off the west side of Elba, when they spotted the 40-gun Carrère, on her passage from Porto-Ercole to Porto-Longone with a convoy of small vessels. Pearl sailed to cut off the frigate's destination but only Pomone got close enough to engage. Carrère surrendered to her after a 10-minute action but the convoy managed to escape.

His majesty's ships Pearl, Pomone, the ships-of-the-line Renown, Gibraltar, Dragon, Alexander, Généreux and Stately, and the brig Vincejo, supplied nearly 700 seamen and marines for an attack on the French batteries investing the town. The action took place on 14 September but was only partially successful, and eight days later the British ships left Elba, though Porto Ferrajo remained in British hands until the end of the war.

==== Prizes taken during the French Revolutionary War ====
Vessels captured or destroyed during the French Revolutionary War for which Pearl's crew received full or partial credit (Note: Does not include prizes taken in fleet actions.)
12 March 1797	Incroyable	French	Privateer (24 guns)	Captured
27 March 1798	Santa Margarita	Spanish	Brig	Captured
14 October 1798	Scocvola	French	Sloop (10 guns)	Captured off Antigua
December 1798	Independence	French	Privateer (12 guns)	Captured off Antigua
14 January 1799	Andreas and Lauritz	Not recorded	Not recorded	Captured
13 January 1800	Signor Montserrat	Spanish	Brig	Captured
27 January 1800	Dillon	French	Brig	Captured
27 January 1800	Not recorded	French	Settee	Captured
9 February 1800	Not recorded	Genoese	Polacca (14 guns)	Driven ashore and destroyed
28 April 1800	Vertue	Genoese	Brig	Captured off Marseille
28 April 1800	Cofianza	Genoese	Settee	Captured off Marseille
2 May 1800	Annunciation	Genoese	Settee	Captured off Marseille
3 May 1800	Not recorded	Genoese	Settee	Captured off Marseille
20 May 1800	Veloce	Ragusan	Brig	Captured off Marseille
5 June 1800	Not recorded	French	Settee	Burnt
11 June 1800	Santa Formiglia	Ragusan	Ship	Captured
24 June 1800	St Catherine	Spanish	Xebec	Captured off Alicante
24 June 1800	St Antonio	Spanish	Settee	Captured off Alicante
24 June 1800	Not recorded	Spanish	Settee	Captured off Alicante
10 July 1800	Neva Sorte	Ragusan	Slaver	Captured
10 July 1800	Aimable Marie	Ragusan	Slaver	Captured
20 July 1800	Santo Christo	Spanish	Xebec	Captured off Cape Couronne
20 July 1800	Veloce como Penser	Spanish	Xebec	Captured off Cape Couronne
20 July 1800	Virgin del Carmen	Spanish	Settee	Captured off Cape Couronne
20 July 1800	Not recorded	Spanish	Settee	Captured off Cape Couronne
20 July 1800	Not recorded	Spanish	Settee	Captured off Cape Couronne
20 July 1800	Not recorded	Spanish	Settee	Scuttled off Cape Couronne
20 July 1800	Not recorded	Spanish	Settee	Scuttled off Cape Couronne
20 July 1800	Not recorded	Spanish	Settee	Scuttled off Cape Couronne
31 August 1800	Gloire	French	Settee	Captured
31 August 1800	Not recorded	French	Settee	Captured
31 August 1800	Not recorded	French	Settee	Captured
31 August 1800	Not recorded	Spanish	Settee	Captured
11 October 1800	Not recorded	French	Settee	Burnt
11 October 1800	Not recorded	French	Settee	Burnt
11 October 1800	Not recorded	French	Ketch	Captured
14 October 1800	Not recorded	Genoese	Ship	Captured
14 October 1800	Not recorded	Genoese	Ship	Captured
15 October 1800	Not recorded	French	Settee	Captured
15 October 1800	Not recorded	French	Settee	Captured
15 October 1800	Not recorded	French	Settee	Captured
15 October 1800	Not recorded	French	Settee	Burnt
22 October 1800	Venus	Not recorded	Transport ship	Captured at Minorca
31 October 1800	Fowler	Not recorded	Transport ship	Captured in Port Mahon
16 November 1800	Pelican	Danish	Brig	Captured
28 February 1801	Virgo Potens	Genoese	Ship	Captured
28 February 1801	Not recorded	Genoese	Tartan	Sunk
28 February 1801	Vierge	French	Tartan	Scuttled
20 March 1801	Julie Rosalie	French	Ship	Scuttled
29 April 1801	St Joseph and Maria Veloce	Genoese	Ship	Captured
30 April 1801	Prevoyant	French	Aviso	Captured
25 June 1801	Jem	Neapolitan	Brig	Captured
25 June 1801	Alemeone Pion	Genoese	Tartan	Captured
25 June 1801	Gesu Maria Giuseppe	Not recorded	Not recorded	Cargo taken
28 June 1801	St Michael L'Ami del Purgatoria	Neapolitan	Tartan	Cargo taken
28 June 1801	Madone Adollaratta St Michael	Neapolitan	Tartan	Cargo taken
1 July 1801	Not recorded	French	Tartan	Captured
1 July 1801	Not recorded	French	Tartan	Captured
1 July 1801	Not recorded	French	Tartan	Destroyed
1 July 1801	Not recorded	French	Tartan	Destroyed
1 July 1801	Not recorded	French	Tartan	Destroyed
3 August 1801	Carriere	French	Frigate	Captured
9 August 1801	Madonna di Idra	Not recorded	Not recorded	Captured
15 September 1801	St Nicolo	Not recorded	Not recorded	Captured

== Fate ==
After the Treaty of Amiens had brought the French Revolutionary War to an end, Pearl remained in the Mediterranean under Ballard until May 1802. She then returned to England and was laid up in ordinary at Portsmouth. In April 1804, she was fitted out as a slop ship, a vessel for the storage and distribution of sailor's clothing. She was laid up again in 1812, then fitted as a receiving ship in April 1814. In March 1825, Pearl was renamed Protheé and put up for sale on 13 April 1831 but was not purchased. The Admiralty eventually disposed of her on 4 January 1832, when she sold for £1,230.0.00d.
