= Niger-class frigate =

1759 class of British fifth-rate frigates

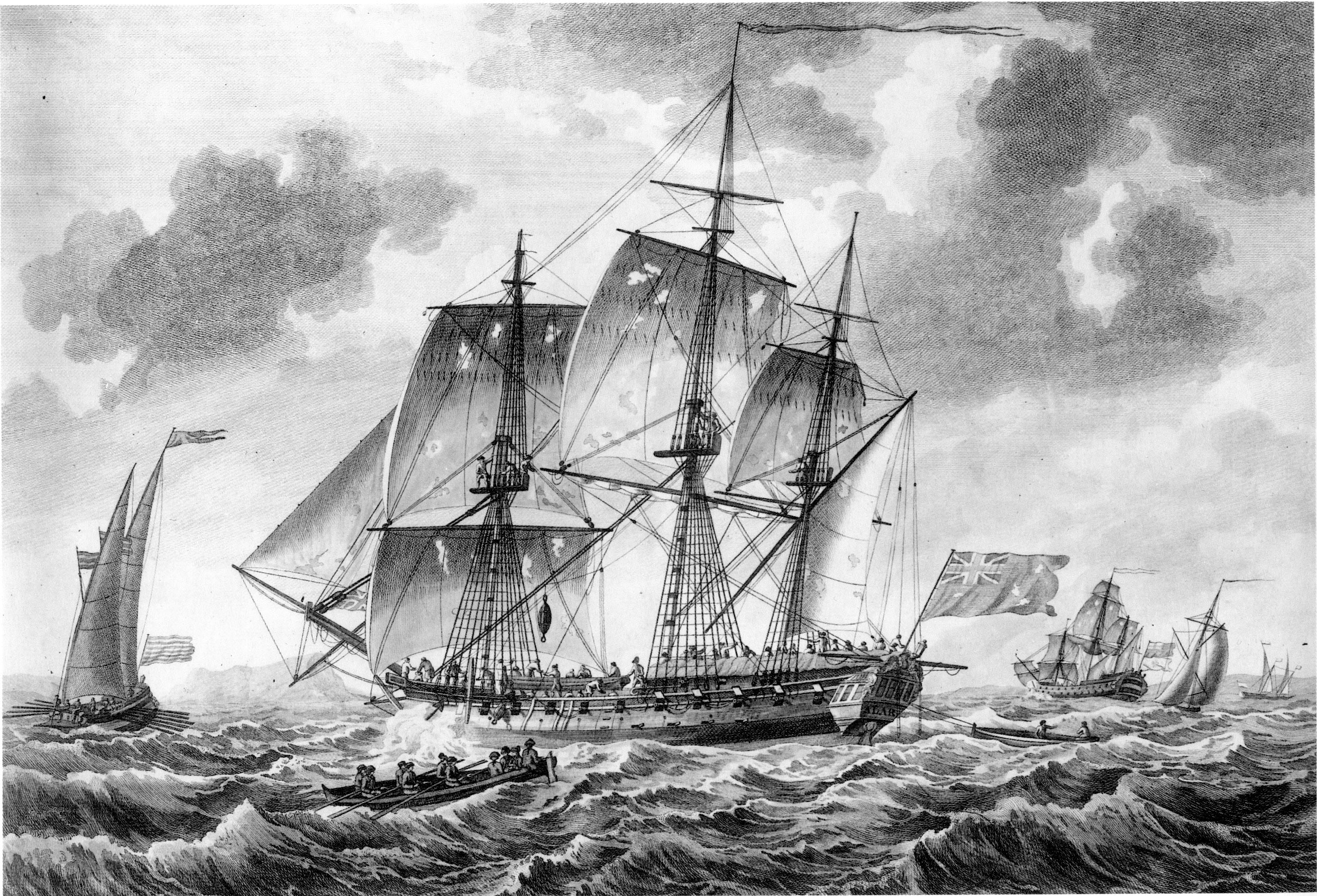
- HMS Alarm in 1758

Class overview
- Name: Niger class
- Built: 1757–1766
- In commission: 1759–1814
- Completed: 11

General characteristics
- Type: Frigate
- Tons burthen: 679 67/94 (as designed)
- Length: 125 ft (38 m)
- Beam: 35 ft 2 in (11 m)
- Depth of hold: 12 ft (4 m)
- Sail plan: Full-rigged ship
- Complement: 220
- Armament: 32 guns comprising: Upperdeck: 26 × 12-pounder guns; Quarterdeck: 4 × 6-pounder guns; Forecastle: 2 × 6-pounder guns

The Niger-class frigates were 32-gun sailing frigates of the fifth rate produced for the Royal Navy. They were designed in 1757 by Sir Thomas Slade, and were an improvement on his 1756 design for the 32-gun Southampton-class frigates.

Slade's design was approved in September 1757, on which date four ships were approved to be built to these plans - three by contract and a fourth in a royal dockyard. Seven more ships were ordered to the same design between 1759 and 1762 - three more to be built by contract and four in royal dockyards. Stag and Quebec were both reduced to 28-gun sixth rates in 1778, but were then restored to 32-gun fifth rates in 1779.

== Ships in class ==
- Stag
  - Ordered: 19 September 1757
  - Built by: Thomas Stanton & Company, Rotherhithe.
  - Keel laid: 26 September 1757
  - Launched: 4 September 1758
  - Completed: 4 December 1758 at Deptford Dockyard.
  - Fate: Taken to pieces at Deptford Dockyard in July 1783.
- Alarm
  - Ordered: 19 September 1757
  - Built by: John Barnard & John Turner, Harwich.
  - Keel laid: 26 September 1757
  - Launched: 19 September 1758
  - Completed: 24 June 1759 at the builder's shipyard.
  - Fate: Taken to pieces at Portsmouth Dockyard in September 1812.
- Aeolus
  - Ordered: 19 September 1757
  - Built by: Thomas West, Deptford.
  - Keel laid: September 1757
  - Launched: 29 November 1758
  - Completed: 18 January 1759 at Deptford Dockyard.
  - Fate: Renamed Guernsey on 7 May 1800. Taken to pieces at Sheerness Dockyard in April 1801.
- Niger
  - Ordered: 19 September 1757
  - Built by: Sheerness Dockyard.
  - Keel laid: 7 February 1758
  - Launched: 25 September 1759
  - Completed: 24 November 1759.
  - Fate: Renamed Negro 1813. Sold at Portsmouth Dockyard on 29 September 1814.
- Montreal
  - Ordered: 6 June 1759
  - Built by: Sheerness Dockyard.
  - Keel laid: 26 April 1760
  - Launched: 15 September 1761
  - Completed: 10 October 1761.
  - Fate: Captured by French squadron off Gibraltar on 1 May 1779.
- Quebec
  - Ordered: 16 July 1759
  - Built by: John Barnard & John Turner, Harwich.
  - Keel laid: July 1759
  - Launched: 14 July 1760
  - Completed: 9 August 1760 at the builder's shipyard.
  - Fate: Blew up and sunk in action against French frigate La Surveillante off Ushant on 6 October 1779.
- Pearl
  - Ordered: 24 March 1761
  - Built by: Chatham Dockyard.
  - Keel laid: 6 May 1761
  - Launched: 27 March 1762
  - Completed: 14 May 1762.
  - Fate: Renamed Prothee 19 March 1825. Sold at Portsmouth Dockyard on 14 January 1832.
- Emerald
  - Ordered: 24 March 1761
  - Built by: Hugh Blaydes, Hull.
  - Keel laid: 13 May 1761
  - Launched: 8 June 1762
  - Completed: October 1762 at the builder's shipyard.
  - Fate: Taken to pieces at Deptford Dockyard in October 1793.
- Winchelsea
  - Ordered: 11 August 1761
  - Built by: Sheerness Dockyard.
  - Keel laid: 29 March 1762
  - Launched: 31 May 1764
  - Completed: 26 June 1766.
  - Fate: Sold at Sheerness Dockyard on 3 November 1813.
- Glory
  - Ordered: 30 January 1762
  - Built by: Hugh Blaydes & Thomas Hodgson, Hull.
  - Keel laid: March 1762
  - Launched: 24 October 1763
  - Completed: December 1763 at the builder's shipyard.
  - Fate: Taken to pieces at Woolwich Dockyard in January 1786.
- Aurora
  - Ordered: 8 December 1762
  - Built by: Chatham Dockyard.
  - Keel laid: 10 October 1763
  - Launched: 13 January 1766
  - Completed: 24 July 1769.
  - Fate: Lost with all hands in the Indian Ocean (disappeared, fate unknown) in January 1770.
