= HMS Winchelsea (1764) =

Royal Navy frigate

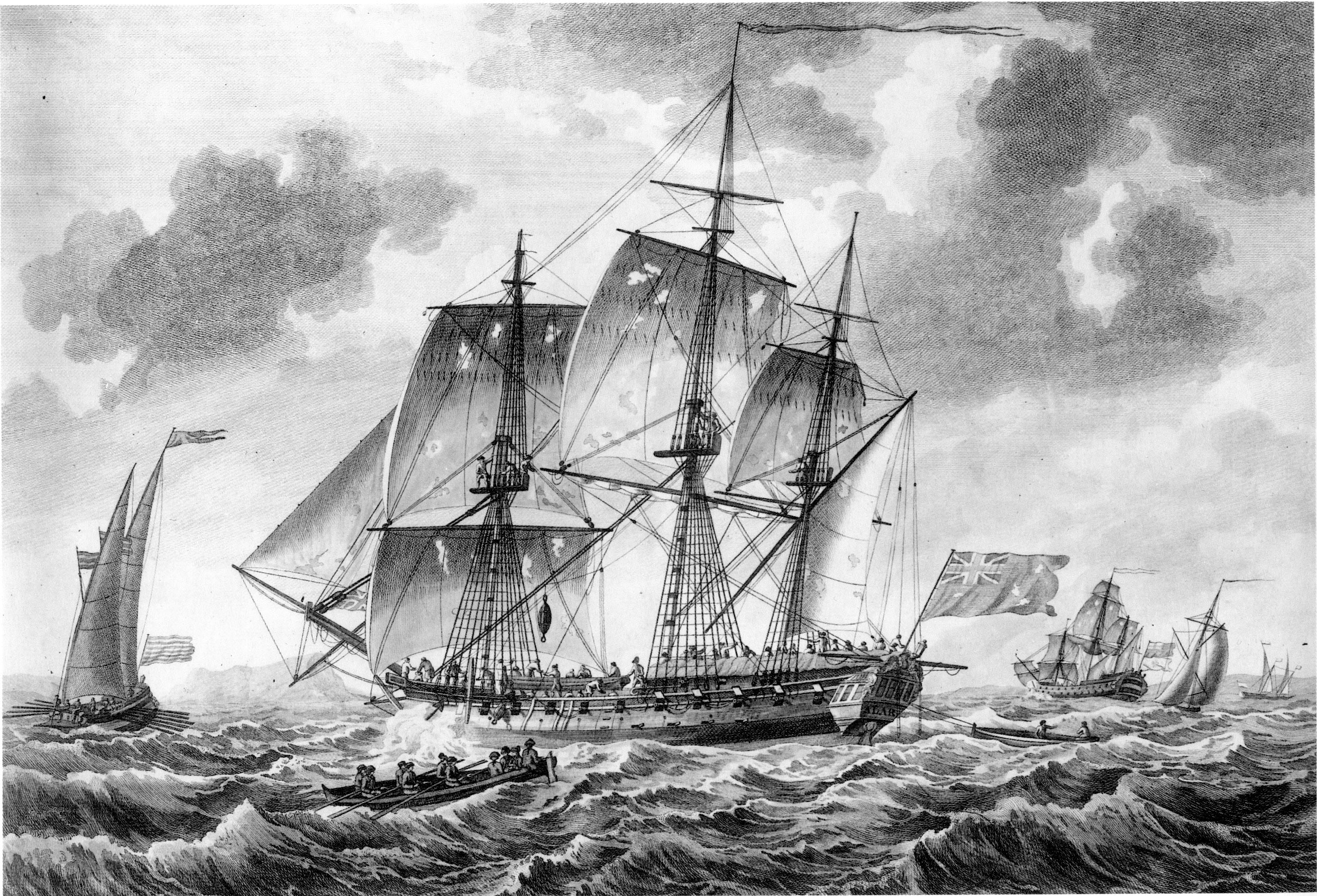
- HMS Alarm, a sister ship of HMS Winchelsea, in 1758

History

Great Britain
- Name: Winchelsea
- Ordered: 11 August 1761
- Builder: Sheerness Dockyard
- Laid down: 29 March 1762
- Launched: 31 May 1764
- Commissioned: February 1769
- Honours and awards: Naval General Service Medal with clasp "Egypt"
- Fate: Sold to be broken up November 1814

General characteristics
- Class & type: Niger-class fifth-rate frigate
- Tons burthen: 679.7 bm
- Length: 125 ft (38 m)
- Beam: 35 ft 2 in (10.72 m)
- Depth of hold: 12 ft (3.7 m)
- Sail plan: Full-rigged ship
- Complement: 220
- Armament: Upperdeck: 26 × 12-pounder guns; QD: 4 × 6-pounder guns; Fc: 2 × 6-pounder guns; 12 × ½-pounder swivels

HMS Winchelsea was a 32-gun fifth-rate Niger-class frigate of the Royal Navy, and was the sixth Royal Navy ship to bear this name (or its archaic form Winchelsey). She was ordered during the Seven Years' War, but completed too late for that conflict. She cost £11,515-18-0d to build.

== Career ==
HMS Winchelsea was brought into service in February 1769, under Captain Samuel Goodall and sailed for service to the Mediterranean. In December 1769 she struck rocks off Cádiz, Spain and was severely damaged. Refloated, she was taken in to Gibraltar for repairs. Command was passed to Captain Thomas Wilkinson in June 1771 with the ship remaining at her Mediterranean station.

In June 1775 she was paid off and returned to Sheerness Dockyard to be placed in ordinary.

She saw later service during the American War of Independence. In December 1776, under command of N. Bateman, she captured the brig Fraiture. Between late December 1776 and early March 1777 she captured the schooners Sally and St. Ann. On 14 May 1777 she captured the brigantine Anne. On 19 May she captured the sloop Lamulant. On 18 August 1777 she captured the polacca, La Providance. She captured the sloops Esprence and Elizabeth, the brig L'Creetia, probably between 12 September and 18 October 1777. She captured the sloop Lidia in early November 1777. She captured the schooner Dorothy on 18 November 1777. She captured St. Joseph between 18 November and 7 December 1777. She captured the sloop Betsy between 7–9 December 1777. She captured the sloops Revenge, Catherine, and the schooner Oxford probably between 5–12 January 1778. She captured the schooner Betsy and sloop Victory probably in late January 1778. On 31 May 1778 she captured an unknown sloop, and possibly privateer Rose, 27 leagues (130 km) south of Cape Hatteras. The ship served until 1794, and was refitted as a troop ship at Portsmouth Dockyard in 1799–1800. Because Winchelsea served in the Navy's Egyptian campaign (8 March to 2 September 1801), her officers and crew qualified for the clasp "Egypt" to the Naval General Service Medal that the Admiralty authorised in 1850 for all surviving claimants. (Note: A first-class share of the prize money awarded in April 1823 was worth £34 2s 4d; a fifth-class share, that of a seaman, was worth 3s 11½d. The amount was small as the total had to be shared between 79 vessels and the entire army contingent.)

== Fate ==
She became a convalescent ship at Sheerness in 1803, finally being sold there to be broken up in November 1814.
