= HMS Stag (1758) =

Frigate of the Royal Navy

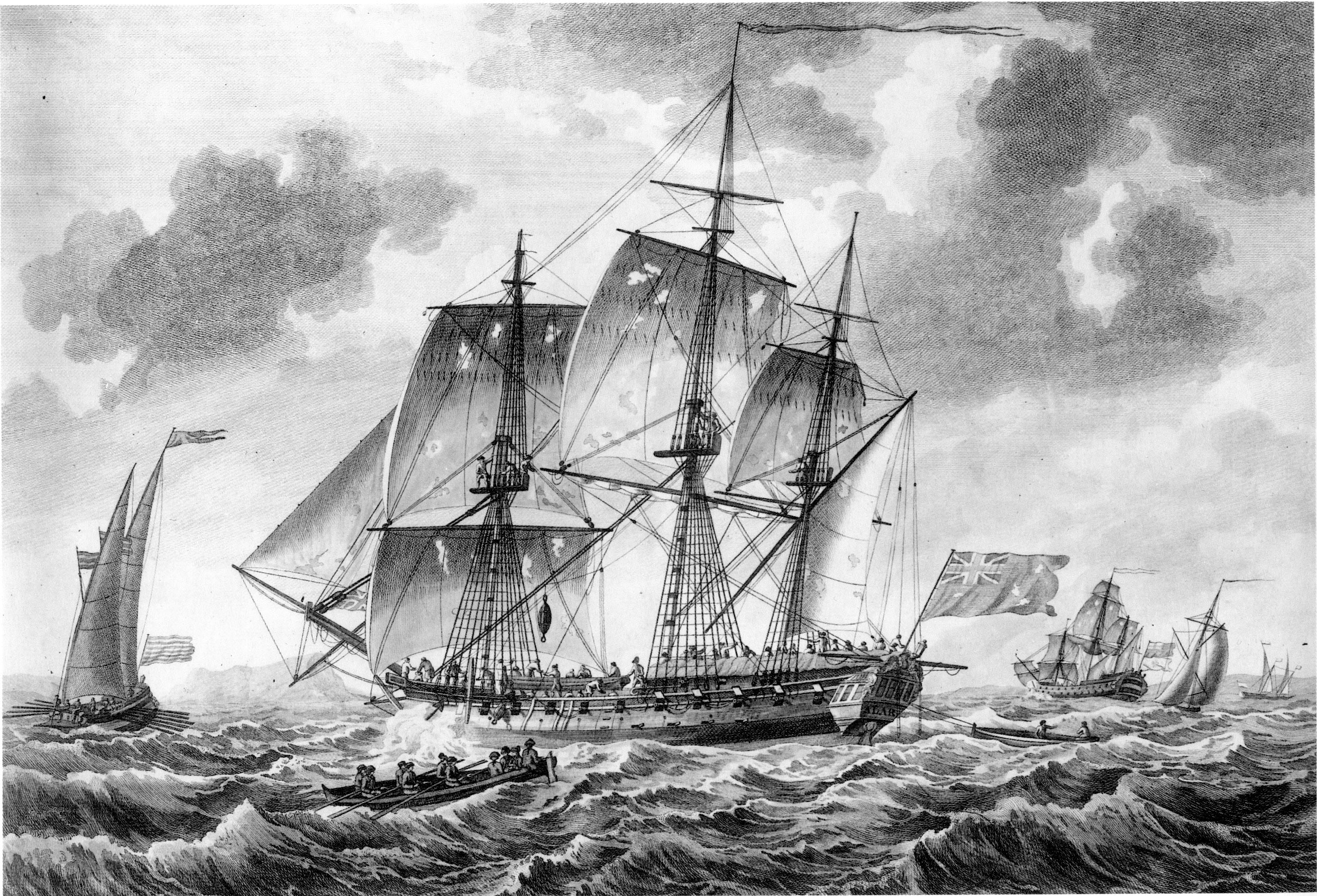
- The HMS Alarm, a sister ship of HMS Stag, in 1758

History

Great Britain
- Name: HMS Stag
- Ordered: 19 September 1757
- Builder: Thomas Stanton, Rotherhithe
- Laid down: 26 September 1758
- Launched: 4 September 1758
- Commissioned: October 1758
- Fate: Broken up July 1783

General characteristics
- Class & type: Niger-class fifth-rate frigate
- Tons burthen: 706 63/94 (bm)
- Length: 125 ft (38.1 m)
- Beam: 35 ft 2 in (10.7 m)
- Depth of hold: 12 ft (3.7 m)
- Sail plan: Full-rigged ship
- Complement: 220
- Armament: Upperdeck: 26 × 12-pounder guns; QD: 4 × 6-pounder guns; Fc: 2 × 6-pounder bow chasers; 12 × swivel guns

HMS Stag was a 32-gun Niger-class fifth-rate frigate of the Royal Navy, and was the first Royal Navy ship to bear this name. She was ordered during the Seven Years' War, and saw service during that conflict and also during the American War of Independence.

== History ==
Stag was brought into service in October 1758, under Captain Henry Angel. She cost £7,136 19s 8d to build, plus fitting-out costs of £4,370 15s 2d.She was reduced to a 28-gun sixth rate in 1777, but restored as a 32-gun fifth rate in 1779. In August 1781, Stag and Viper were in company when they recaptured the sloop Peggy and the cutter Hope.

On 4 January 1782, Stag under the command of Captain Robert Palliser Cooper, captured the French privateer Anti-Briton. Anti-Briton was armed with twenty-two 6-pounder guns and had a crew of 104 men under the command of John Kelly. Cooper had received intelligence that a privateer cutter had taken several vessels in the channel between Ireland and Britain. As soon as the weather permitted, Cooper set sail and was fortunate enough to encounter and capture her. Cooper reported that he took great pleasure in capturing her as she was quite new and had done a great deal of mischief. Kelly had captured the cutter Hope in August 1781. The Royal Navy took Anti-Briton into service as HMS Trimmer.

Then on 18 June Stag captured the French privateer cutter Victoire after an eleven-hour chase. Cooper had received intelligence on the 14th that two French privateers were cruising off Waterford. He immediately set off in pursuit and caught up with Victoire off Dungarvan. Victoire was armed with two 8-pounder and fourteen 6-pounder guns, six of which she threw overboard during the chase, and a crew of 91 men. Victoire was a new, copper-bottomed cutter, sixteen days out of Brest. The other French privateer, the cutter Eagle, of Dunkirk, was reportedly of the "same force" as Victoire, but had already left the area.

== Fate ==
Stag was broken up in July 1783 at Deptford.
