= Canadian Arctic Rift System =

North American geological structure

- Rift system
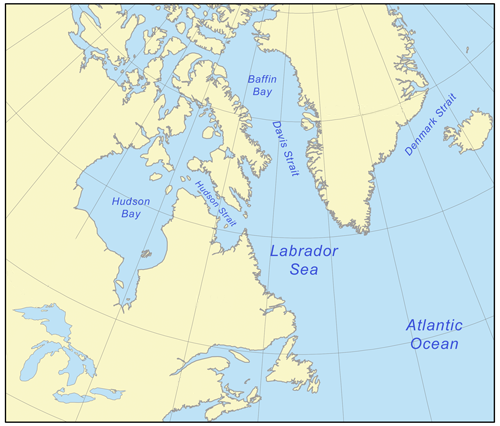
- Map of water bodies in northeastern Canada, including Baffin Bay and the Labrador Sea, which occupy basins created by the Canadian Arctic Rift System.
- Interactive map of Canadian Arctic Rift System
- Coordinates: 65°N 58°W
- Location: Canada/Greenland
- Age: Paleozoic-to-Cenozoic

Dimensions
  - Length: 4,800 km (3,000 mi)

The Canadian Arctic Rift System is a major North American geological structure extending from the Labrador Sea in the southeast through Davis Strait, Baffin Bay and the Arctic Archipelago in the northwest. It consists of a series of interconnected rifts that formed during the Paleozoic, Mesozoic and Cenozoic eras. Extensional stresses along the entire length of the rift system have resulted in a variety of tectonic features, including grabens, half-grabens, basins and faults.

Development of the Canadian Arctic Rift System was accompanied by two plate tectonic episodes that originated on opposite sides of the North American plate and were propagated toward each other. Both were strongly controlled by pre-existing structures, which either guided the propagating faults or impeded their growth. The rift system is now inactive apart from minor adjustments that are indicated by occasional earthquakes in Baffin Bay and the Labrador Sea.

== Geology ==
The Canadian Arctic Rift System is a branch of the Mid-Atlantic Ridge that extends 4,800 km (3,000 mi) into the North American continent. It is an incipient structure that diminishes in degree of development northwestward, bifurcates at the head of Baffin Bay and disappears into the Arctic Archipelago. The rift system is mainly an extensional structure, which has allowed Greenland and Canada to rotate apart and form intervening seaways. The segment extending from the Labrador Sea to Baffin Bay is sometimes referred to as the Labrador Sea–Baffin Bay rift system or the North Atlantic–Labrador Sea rift system.

=== Tectonic evolution ===
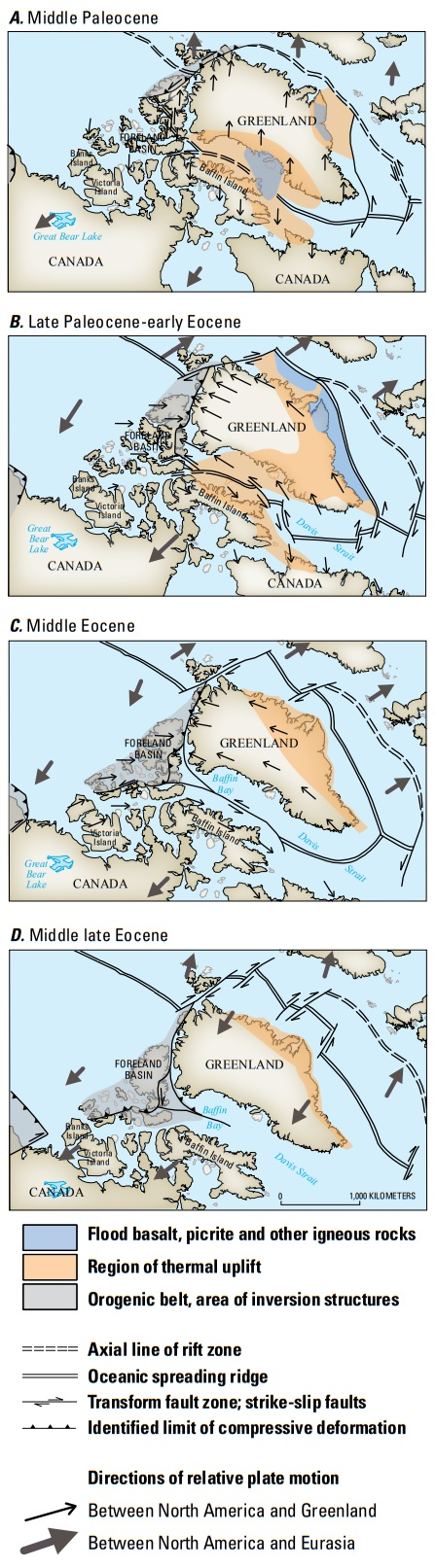
Middle Paleocene to middle late Eocene tectonics of Northern Canada and Greenland

Two rifting episodes created the Canadian Arctic Rift System. The first is referred to as the Boreal Rifting Episode which followed compression and exposure brought on by the Ellesmerian orogeny. The second is referred to as the Eurekan Rifting Episode and created most of the structures that comprise the Canadian Arctic Rift System. Both rifting episodes were active simultaneously from the Early Cretaceous to mid-Tertiary.

==== Boreal Rifting Episode ====
The Boreal Rifting Episode began in the Late Devonian and emanated southeastward from the Canada Basin into the North American continent. It caused uplift of the Pearya Geanticline and Sverdrup Rim, as well as crustal extension which led to thinning and subsidence of the regional lithosphere. The rifting extended only into the area that would be occupied by the future central Queen Elizabeth Islands and was aborted there due to interfering structural trends. In the extreme west, in the Banks Island area, extension of the Boreal Rifting Episode continued uninterrupted until the mid-Tertiary.

==== Eurekan Rifting Episode ====
The Eurekan Rifting Episode commenced in the Early Cretaceous as the Boreal Rifting Episode declined. Crustal stretching began at the south end of the rift system 130 million years ago, during which supercontinent Laurasia was in the process of breaking apart. Rifting began from the Atlantic Ocean then propagated northwest where the Labrador Sea started opening in the Late Cretaceous. Seafloor spreading commenced in the southern Labrador Sea 75–60 million years ago, during which Greenland moved north relative to mainland North America. This northward movement gave rise to compressive forces between northern Greenland and the Arctic Archipelago, setting the stage for the Eurekan orogeny. Seafloor spreading reached the northern Labrador Sea 60–40 million years ago and Greenland moved simultaneously past Ellesmere Island along the Nares Strait. Approximately 170 km (110 mi) of Paleocene separation occurred between Greenland and Baffin Island, producing oceanic crust within Baffin Bay.

With the commencement of active seafloor spreading in the Norwegian Sea during the Early Eocene, the direction of seafloor spreading changed in both the Labrador Sea and Baffin Bay. Continued spreading in the Norwegian Sea eventually separated Greenland from Eurasia, resulting in the creation of the Greenland plate and the South Greenland triple junction. By this time spreading within Baffin Bay and the Labrador Sea had slowed and became oblique, eventually ceasing between 45 and 36 million years ago.

The final phase of rifting was marked by continental extension in the mid-Tertiary. It breached the North American continent and reached the Arctic Ocean, resulting in the formation of the Parry and Nares submarine rift valleys, the Queen Elizabeth Islands and the Queen Elizabeth Islands Subplate. This rifting lasted until the Early Miocene or later.

==== The rift system today ====
Little seismicity takes place on the Canadian Arctic Rift System, indicating it is now a nearly inactive structure and that the entire system is travelling as a part of the North American plate. Several earthquakes occur, but their patterns indicate tectonic forces characteristic of plate margins are not acting directly within the Canadian Arctic today. As a result, there are questions as to whether the Greenland plate should still be considered a separate plate. The present seismic activity may be mainly an expression of readjustment of existing rift structures to a regional stress field associated with post-glacial rebound.

The area between Greenland and Baffin Island is one of the most seismically active regions in eastern Canada. It was not known as a seismic zone until November 20, 1933, when an earthquake with a surface-wave magnitude of 7.3 occurred beneath Baffin Bay. This is the largest instrumentally recorded earthquake to have occurred along the passive margin of North America and possibly the largest passive-margin earthquake worldwide. Coincidentally, it is also the largest north of the Arctic Circle. In spite of its size, the 1933 Baffin Bay earthquake did not result in any damage due to its offshore location combined with the sparse population of the adjacent onshore areas. Analysis of seismograms indicate strike-slip faulting played a role in the occurrence of this earthquake. Earthquakes of magnitude 6.0 or greater have since been recorded in 1934, 1945, 1947 and 1957.

A linear belt of medium-amplitude earthquakes known as the Labrador Sea Seismic Zone is coincident with the extinct spreading axis of the Mid-Labrador Ridge. Earthquakes as large as magnitude 5.0 have been recorded along this zone since 1982.

=== Structure ===
==== Faults ====
The Ungava Fault Zone is a major tectonic feature of Davis Strait separating the failed Labrador Sea and Baffin Bay spreading centres. It was associated with leaky transform motion related to the northward motion of Greenland relative to mainland North America during the Paleogene. The fault zone has a length of roughly 1,000 km (620 mi) and an elongate north-northeast trend. A northern extension called the Ikermiut Fault Zone is dominated by Late Paleocene to Early Eocene thrust faults due to strike-slip movements between the Greenland and North American plates.

Situated on Bathurst Island is the Southeast Bathurst Fault Zone, a north–south trending system of normal faults forming a graben-like structure. It originally formed during the Boreal Rifting Episode, but was reactivated during a period of regional uplift and compression brought on by the Eurekan Rifting Episode. The South Cape Fault Zone to the northeast is a major east–west trending fault extending throughout much of the length of Jones Sound. It cuts across the peninsulas of southern Ellesmere Island.

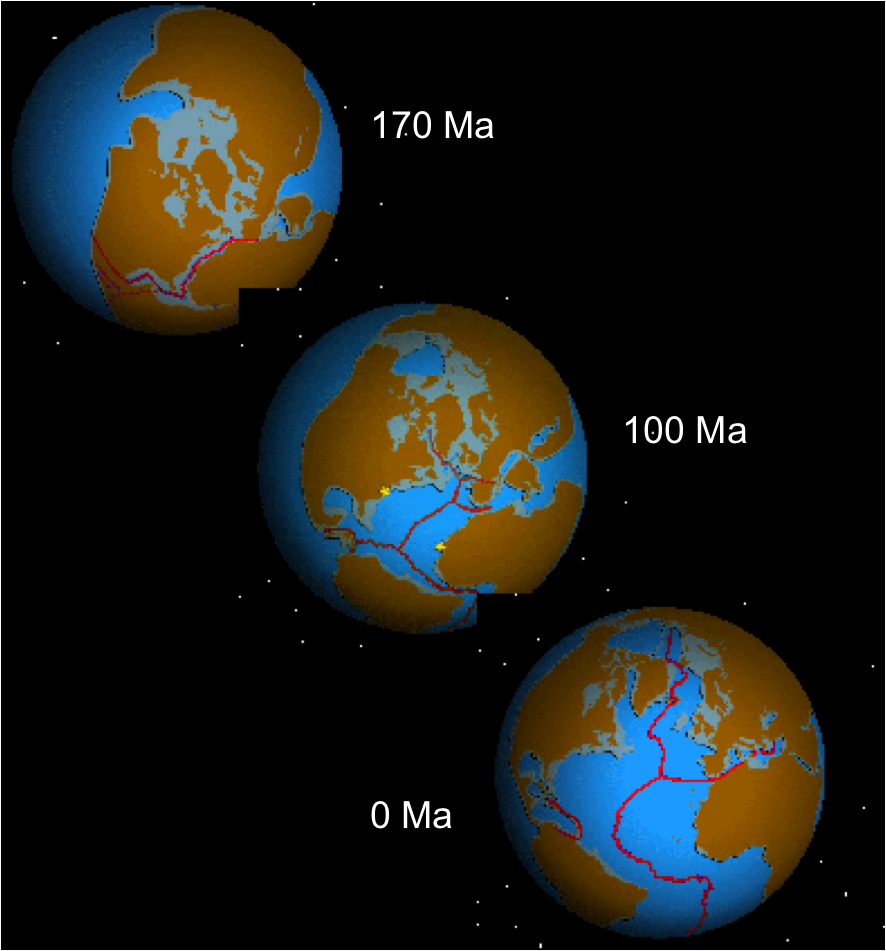
Opening of Central and North Atlantic from 170 million years ago to the present. Middle figure shows Eurekan rifting between Greenland and the Labrador Peninsula 100 million years ago.

Extending several hundred kilometres through Crozier Strait is the Crozier Strait Fault Zone. It lies within a north-trending anticline of the Cornwallis Fold Belt and appears to contain a lowered fault block. Bathymetric data suggest it is a possible graben structure with steep, linear, north–south margins that formed during the Eurekan Rifting Episode. The faults forming the supposed graben appear to have been guided in part by the structure of the Cornwallis Fold Belt, but probably were controlled ultimately by trends in the Precambrian crystalline basement.

The Kaltag Fault is a northeast trending structure extending along the continental margin northwest of the Queen Elizabeth Islands. It forms a boundary between the Canadian Arctic Rift System and other rifted structures to the northwest. The Kaltag acted as a transform fault with intermittent pulses of both extension and strike-slip displacement during three time intervals. Tectonism during the first time interval from Carboniferous to Permian was coeval with an early stage of the Boreal Rifting Episode. This was followed by a second time interval of tectonism from the latest Cretaceous to early Tertiary when the Boreal Rifting Episode was active and the Eurekan Rifting Episode was in an early stage of development. A third and final time interval of tectonism during the Miocene or Pliocene coincided with the final phase of the Eurekan Rifting Episode, during which the Kaltag Fault was the northwestern boundary of the Queen Elizabeth Islands Subplate.

Trending along the north side of Lancaster Sound is a major steeply dipping normal fault called the Parry Channel Fault. As much as 8 km (5.0 mi) of vertical displacement took place along this fault during the Eurekan Rifting Episode. The Northern Baffin and Admiralty faults trend along the south side of Lancaster Sound, the former of which is dominant. It extends from Admiralty Inlet in the west then trends eastward along the north coasts of Baffin and Bylot islands to Baffin Bay where it possibly connects with other rift structures.

The Prince Regent Fault is a major fault that trends along the east coast of Somerset Island. It forms the southwestern boundary of the Lancaster Aulacogen and is west of the inferred Brodeur Peninsula Fault, which presumably trends along the northwest coast of Baffin Island's Brodeur Peninsula. The main evidence of the Prince Regent Fault is the straightness of Somerset Island's east coast, but the southern end of this fault also connects with a lineament that is a known fault on land.

A series of fracture zones are present in the Labrador Sea. These include the northeasterly trending Julian Haab and Cartwright fracture zones, as well as the north-northeasterly trending Hudson, Snorri, Minna and Leif fracture zones. The change in trend corresponds with a more northerly spreading direction of the Mid-Labrador Ridge during the Eocene.

==== Basins ====
Sverdrup Basin is a Carboniferous rift basin in the Queen Elizabeth Islands that formed during the Boreal Rifting Episode. It has a northeast–southwest axis of about 1,300 km (810 mi) and a width of up to 400 km (250 mi), encompassing an area of 313,000 km^{2} (121,000 mi^{2}).

Baffin Basin is a north-northwest trending geologic structure underlying much of central Baffin Bay. It formed as a result of seafloor spreading during the Tertiary opening of Baffin Bay around 56 million years ago. The northern extent of the basin is bounded by the Jones Sound, Lancaster Sound and Nares Strait aquatic sills 150 to 200 m (490 to 660 ft) below sea level while its southern extent is delimited by the Davis Strait aquatic sill roughly 600 m (2,000 ft) below sea level.

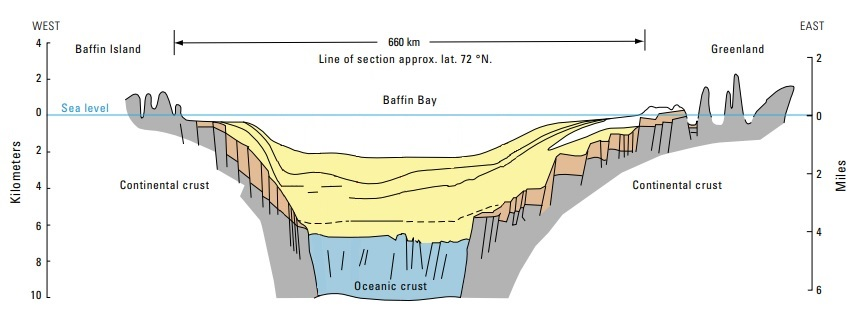
Cross section of Baffin Basin showing sediment infilling (yellow) and underlying oceanic crust (blue)

Lancaster Basin is a half-graben forming the eastern mouth of the larger Parry Submarine Rift Valley. It contains several block faulted structures and is filled with Mesozoic, Tertiary and Quaternary sediments.

Barrow Basin is a prominent topographic depression and, like Lancaster Basin to the east, represents a half-graben of the Parry Submarine Rift Valley bounded on the north by high-angle normal faults. Non-marine Tertiary sediments up to approximately 1,100 m (3,600 ft) thick exist in the Barrow Basin.

Lady Franklin Basin is one of the deepest basins offshore West Greenland. It was established during Early Cretaceous rifting and lies within a fault zone delimiting the northern end of the Labrador Sea. A thick succession of Cretaceous and Cenozoic sediments occupies the Lady Franklin Basin.

Labrador Basin is an immense structural trough between Greenland and Labrador that formed as a result of seafloor spreading from the Late Cretaceous to the Late Eocene. Its seabed consists of a slightly southeast trending plain that ranges 3,000 to 4,500 m (9,800 to 14,800 ft) below sea level. In the southeastern part of the basin are a series of seamounts that gradually decrease in height to the northwest. Geophysical data suggest they are the tops of the buried Mid-Labrador Ridge, which in the southeast is conjugated with the Mid-Atlantic Ridge. The P wave velocity structure under the Labrador Basin resembles that of the Mid-Atlantic Ridge, supporting the interpretation that the Canadian Arctic Rift System is a branch of that ridge. A characteristic feature of the Labrador Basin is the Northwest Atlantic Mid-Ocean Channel. This is a 100-to-150-metre-deep (330 to 490 ft) turbidity current system of channels that extend southward along the axis of the basin and then into the Newfoundland Basin.

Situated on Bylot Island and northern Baffin Island are a series of grabens and horsts that constitute the North Baffin Rift Zone. These structures formed intermittently from late Proterozoic to early Tertiary time, with the latest period of reactivation having taken place during the Eurekan Rifting Episode.

=== Igneous petrology ===
Like many rifts worldwide, the Canadian Arctic Rift System was a site of magmatic activity during active tectonism. This activity was associated with seafloor spreading in the Baffin and Labrador basins as well as continental rifting within the Arctic Archipelago. Several episodes of intrusive and extrusive activity took place from the Paleozoic to Cenozoic with the emplacement of dikes, sills, lava flows and pyroclastic rocks.

The Sverdrup Basin Magmatic Province in the east-central Sverdrup Basin is an Early Cretaceous to Paleogene large igneous province. It consists of pyroclastic deposits, thin lava flows, flood basalts and central volcanoes, as well as hypabyssal sills and dikes. Argon–argon dating of mafic igneous rocks from the province suggests mafic magmatism peaked during two time intervals. The first time interval between 127 and 129 million years ago was characterized by the widespread intrusion of sills and dikes. Flood basalt volcanism during the second time interval between 92 and 98 million years ago was coeval with the development of the proto-Arctic Ocean. Sills and flood basalts of the Sverdrup Basin Magmatic Province are well-exposed in the Princess Margaret Range, a north–south trending mountain range extending across the length of Axel Heiberg Island. Basaltic lava flows occur in the Isachsen and Strand Fiord formations. Sills intrude the entire Mesozoic succession and are particularly abundant in the Triassic shales of the Blaa Mountain Group.

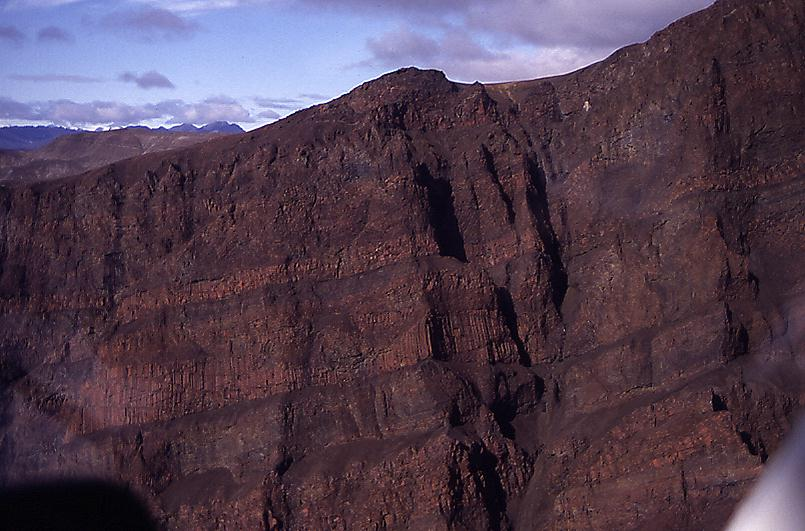
Strand Fiord Formation basalt flows on Axel Heiberg Island are a product of volcanism in the Canadian Arctic Rift System.

A volcanic suite of Eocene age occurs in the Freemans Cove area of Bathurst Island. It is confined to the Southeast Bathurst Fault Zone, consisting of sills, dikes, agglomeratic vents and small plugs. Most of the suite consists of nephelinite or larnite-normative nephelinites and basanites, with rarer olivine melilite nephelinite, phonolite and tholeiitic and alkali basalt rocks. Extensive erosion has removed all traces of lava flows but lava fragments, bombs and scoria occur as clasts within the agglomerates. Erosional remnants of 50-metre-thick (160 ft) sills form the prominent mesas of North Mesa, Peaked Hill and Round Hill, the latter two of which consist of tholeiitic basalt and alkali basalt respectively.

A major episode of Tertiary magmatism related to the opening of Baffin Bay emplaced mafic intrusions and volcanic rocks on Baffin Island and in West Greenland. Basaltic breccias and lavas on Baffin Island are exposed mainly along a narrow coastal strip between Cape Dyer and Cape Searle. They have a total thickness of over 200 m (660 ft) and are bounded in the north by minor intrusions. The volcanic suite in West Greenland consists mainly of lava flows and occurs on Disko Island, Illorsuit Island and the Nunavik and Nuussuaq peninsulas. A central volcano formed on Illorsuit Island with the emplacement of the Sarqâta qáqâ gabbro-granophyre intrusion roughly 56 million years ago. The Tertiary volcanic rocks of Baffin Island and West Greenland form part of the North Atlantic Igneous Province, which extends roughly 3,000 km (1,900 mi) eastward through East Greenland, Iceland, the Faroe Islands, Ireland and Scotland. This large igneous province has been linked to the Iceland hotspot.

== Oceanography ==
Extending through northern North America is a major seaway system connecting the Atlantic and Arctic oceans. This system was created by geological events of the Canadian Arctic Rift System and is still controlled by rift structures. It includes the Northwest Passage, which cuts through the Labrador Sea, Baffin Bay, Parry Channel and other channels within and adjacent to the Arctic Archipelago. Inflow from the Atlantic Ocean and outflow from the Arctic Ocean has resulted in ocean currents flowing along the rifted continental margins of West Greenland, Baffin Island and Labrador.

=== Waterbodies ===
Nares Strait lies within the Nares Submarine Rift Valley between North Greenland and Ellesmere Island. It is a north-northeast trending channel connecting Baffin Bay in the south with the Arctic Ocean in the north. From south to north, the strait includes Smith Sound, Kane Basin, Kennedy Channel, Hall Basin and Robeson Channel.

Parry Channel is a waterway in the Arctic Archipelago formed by the Parry Submarine Rift Valley. It consists of four waterbodies: Lancaster Sound, M'Clure Strait, Viscount Melville Sound and Barrow Strait. With a length of over 1,100 km (680 mi), Parry Channel connects Baffin Bay in the east with Beaufort Sea in the west. The north and south sides of the channel are opened by a number of smaller waterways. Of these, Admiralty Inlet penetrates deep into the northwestern part of Baffin Island from the south side of Lancaster Sound. At the west end of Parry Channel, Prince of Wales Strait leads southwest from the junction of Viscount Melville Sound and M'Clure Strait into Amundsen Gulf.

Jones Sound occupies a rift valley between Ellesmere Island in the north and Devon Island in the south. It has an east–west length of roughly 210 km (130 mi) and a width varying from about 47 to 116 km (29 to 72 mi). Surface data and the existence of corresponding seaward-dropping fault blocks on the north coast of Devon Island and on the south coast of Ellesmere Island suggest Jones Sound may be a graben structure.

Baffin Bay is a 1,200 km (750 mi) long and 500 km (310 mi) wide semi-enclosed sea surrounded by Ellesmere Island and Devin Island in the north, Greenland in the east and Baffin Island in the west. It is an example of a failed proto-ocean, centrally underlain by oceanic crust of the Baffin Basin which is surrounded by extended continental crust that varies approximately 25 to 30 km (16 to 19 mi) thick. Connected to the North Atlantic Ocean in the south through Davis Strait and to the Arctic Ocean in the north through Nares Strait, Jones Sound and Lancaster Sound, the ocean water in Baffin Bay is highly stratified. The surface water, of Arctic origin, is cold and fresh. Below the Arctic layer is a layer of Atlantic origin, which is warm and saline. Below the Atlantic layer are Baffin Bay Deep Water and Baffin Bay Bottom Water, both of which are cold and saline. On a net annual basis, approximately 1.7 Sv of water flows out of the Arctic Ocean through Baffin Bay, making the bay the second most important conduit between the Arctic Ocean and the rest of the world's oceans.

The Labrador Sea is an arm of the North Atlantic Ocean occupying the Labrador Basin between Greenland and Labrador. It shallows and passes into Davis Strait in the north and is open to the North Atlantic Ocean in the southeast. The sea is flanked by continental shelves with banks less than 200 m (660 ft) deep separated by glacially eroded channels: the southern West Greenland shelf in the northeast, the Labrador shelf in the southwest and the Baffin Island shelf in the northwest. An intermediate cold water mass known as Labrador Sea Water is formed by convective processes in the Labrador Sea. It represents a key component of the Atlantic Meridional Overturning Circulation, which is a major contributor to the transport and storage of heat, freshwater and other tracers in the Atlantic Ocean.

Crozier Strait between Bathurst Island and Little Cornwallis Island dominates the Crozier Strait Fault Zone. It is a narrow but extremely deep body of water measuring roughly 30 km (19 mi) long and 8 km (5.0 mi) wide at its narrowest point. The strait, an arm of the Arctic Ocean, connects Queens Channel in the north with McDougall Sound in the south.

Prince Regent Inlet occupies a southern branch of the Lancaster Aulacogen between Baffin Island and Somerset Island. It is a deep waterbody measuring 64 km (40 mi) wide at its northern end and over 105 km (65 mi) at its southern end. The inlet connects Lancaster Sound in the north with the Gulf of Boothia in the south.

Davis Strait is a narrow and relatively shallow area connecting Baffin Bay in the north with the Labrador Sea in the south. It varies in width from 300 km (190 mi) to over 950 km (590 mi), with the shallowest waters found along the Davis Sill. This aquatic sill is a submarine ridge 350 to 550 m (1,150 to 1,800 ft) below sea level extending from Baffin Island in the west to Greenland in the east. Unlike Baffin Bay and the Labrador Sea, Davis Strait is bounded by volcanic passive margins. Paleogene volcanic rocks are exposed on both sides of the strait: the Disko-Svartenhuk area of West Greenland in the east and near Cape Dyer on Baffin Island in the west.

Hudson Strait–Evans Strait–Foxe Channel is a 1,000-kilometre-long (620 mi) waterbody connecting Hudson Bay and Foxe Basin in the west-northwest with the Labrador Sea in the south-southeast. It comprises several half-grabens that may have developed during the initial stages of extension in the Labrador Sea. They form sub-basins that are controlled by steeply-dipping normal faults, which predominately dip toward the north.

=== Ocean currents ===
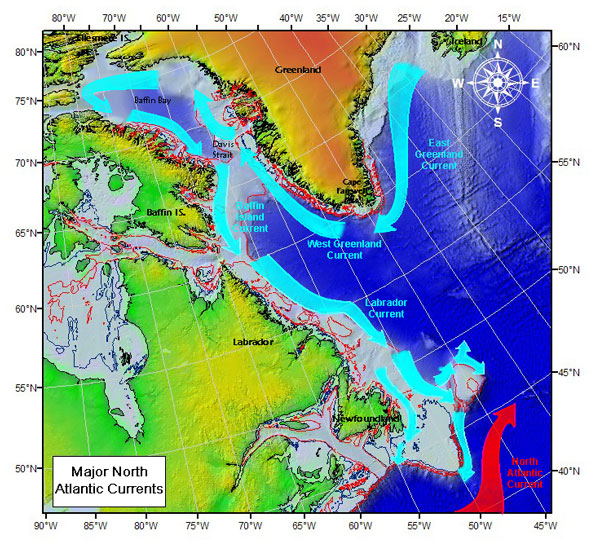
Map of the Labrador, Baffin Island and West Greenland currents

West Greenland Current originates from the movement of Atlantic water flowing around the southern point of Greenland caused by the East Greenland and Irminger currents. It transports freshwater into the Labrador Sea, influencing the formation of Labrador Sea Water. The current flows north along the coast of West Greenland, steadily losing volume through low-velocity westward branching as water is fed into the anticyclonic circulatory system of the Labrador Sea. Just south of Davis Sill, a major westward branching occurs, the remainder of the West Greenland Current continuing across Davis Sill into Baffin Bay where it eventually peters out.

Baffin Island Current consists mainly of relatively fresh Arctic waters that enter northern Baffin Bay through Nares Strait, Jones Sound and Lancaster Sound. First detectable off Devon Island, the Baffin Island Current flows south along the length of western Baffin Bay and the western half of Davis Strait. It then divides at Hudson Strait; one branch sets westward along the northern half of Hudson Strait whereas another branch continues southward towards the Labrador Sea.

Labrador Current is a continuation of the West Greenland and Baffin Island currents. It flows down the west side of the Labrador Sea then back into the North Atlantic Ocean where it continues southward along the east coast of Newfoundland and completely floods the northeastern part of the Grand Banks. Here it divides; one branch sets southwestward along the Avalon Peninsula while another and usually major branch continues southward down the east side of the Grand Banks.

== See also ==
- Geology of Greenland
- Geology of Newfoundland and Labrador
- Geology of the Northwest Territories
- Geology of Nunavut
- List of largest rifts, canyons and valleys in the Solar System
- Opening of the North Atlantic Ocean
