= Geology of Canada =

The geology of Canada is a subject of regional geology and covers the country of Canada, which is the second-largest country in the world. Geologic units and processes are investigated on a large scale to reach a synthesized picture of the geological development of the country.

Geologically, Canada is one of the oldest regions in the world, with more than half of the region consisting of Precambrian rocks that have been above sea level since the beginning of the Palaeozoic era. Canada's mineral resources are diverse and extensive. Across the Canadian Shield and in the north there are large iron, nickel, zinc, copper, gold, lead, molybdenum, and uranium reserves. Large diamond concentrations have been recently developed in the Arctic, making Canada one of the world's largest producers. Throughout the Shield there are many mining towns extracting these minerals. The largest, and best known, is Sudbury, Ontario. Sudbury is an exception to the normal process of forming minerals in the Shield since there is significant evidence that the Sudbury Basin is an ancient meteorite impact crater. The nearby, but less known Temagami Magnetic Anomaly has striking similarities to the Sudbury Basin. Its magnetic anomalies are very similar to the Sudbury Basin, and so it could be a second metal-rich impact crater. The Shield is also covered by vast boreal forests that support an important logging industry.

== By province and territory ==
- Geology of Alberta
- Geology of British Columbia
- Geology of Manitoba
- Geology of New Brunswick
- Geology of Newfoundland and Labrador
- Geology of Nova Scotia
- Geology of Northwest Territories
- Geology of Nunavut
- Geology of Ontario
- Geology of Prince Edward Island
- Geology of Quebec
- Geology of Saskatchewan
- Geology of Yukon
