= Thomas Abernethy (explorer) =

Scottish seafarer and polar explorer (1803–1860)

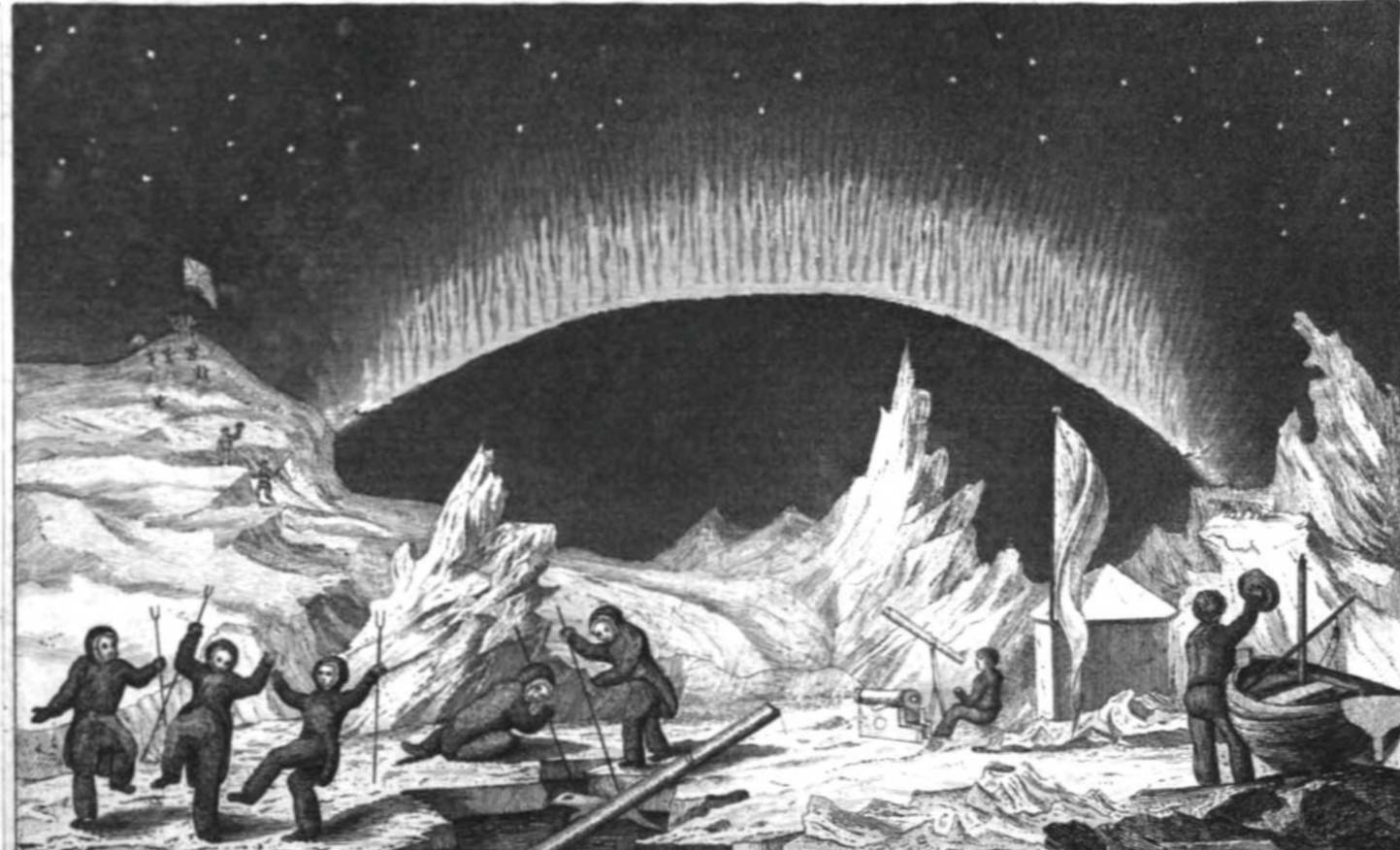
- Illustration from 1835 depicting Abernethy's party at the North Magnetic Pole
- Born: 1803 (Note: Abernethy's gravestone gives 1803 but Markham gives 1802.) Longside, Northeast Scotland
- Died: 13 April 1860 (aged 57) Peterhead, Northeast Scotland
- Branch: Royal Navy
- Rank: Gunnery petty officer
- Awards: Arctic Medal
- Memorials: Gravestone, Peterhead Old Kirkyard
- Spouses: Barbara Fiddes (1829–1854, her death); Rebecca Young (1857–1860, his death)

Thomas Abernethy (1803 – 13 April 1860) was a Scottish seafarer, gunner in the Royal Navy, and polar explorer. Because he was neither an officer nor a gentleman, he was little mentioned in the books written by the leaders of the expeditions he went on, but was praised in what was written. In 1857, he was awarded the Arctic Medal for his service as an able seaman on the 1824–25 voyage of HMS Hecla, the first of his five expeditions for which participants were eligible for the award. He was in parties that, for their time, reached the furthest north, the furthest south (twice), and the nearest to the South Magnetic Pole. In 1831, along with James Clark Ross's team of six, Abernethy was in the first party ever to reach the North Magnetic Pole.

== Early and personal life ==
Thomas Abernethy was born in 1803 at Longside in northeast Scotland. While he was a child, his family moved to Peterhead, a nearby port. His parents were James Abernethy, a stonemason, and Isabella Robertson. Thomas had an elder sister, Ann, who was born in 1801, and twin brothers, James and William, who were both born in 1816. Thomas went to sea at the age of ten and when he was about twelve he was apprenticed as a merchant seaman on the sloop Friends. He travelled to the West Indies and twice to Newfoundland. In 1819, he became a greenhand (Note: A greenhand was a trainee on his first voyage on a 19th-century whaler and who would have the smallest share of the profits.) on the maiden voyage of the Peterhead whaling ship Hannibal, which hunted bowhead whales around the eastern coast of Greenland, and in its third season sailed into the Davis Strait on the western coast, where ice conditions can be much heavier. In 1829, Abernethy married Barbara Fiddes, the daughter of a ship's carpenter, and they lived at Deptford, southeast London, near the Royal Naval docks. They had no children.

Abernethy was nearly six feet tall and well built – there are no known photographs or portraits of him. He had dark hair and a ruddy complexion. In 1829, John Ross described him as "decidedly the best-looking man in the ship" and he thought that men of his appearance were best able to endure cold. Clements Markham described him as "a handsome man with a well-knit frame, and was resourceful and thoroughly reliable."

== Arctic with Parry, 1824–1827 ==
=== Northwest Passage ===
Canadian Arctic Archipelago. Magenta star is location of North Magnetic Pole in 1831. Red star is location where Franklin's ships were ultimately found.

Sir William Parry is known for many Arctic naval expeditions, particularly in trying to discover a route for a Northwest Passage through the Canadian Arctic Archipelago. For his third attempt, in 1824, Parry took the vessels HMS Fury, under Henry Hoppner and HMS Hecla, with Parry himself in command, and Abernethy signed on as one of the 75-strong Hecla crew. He was an able seaman, just one rank above ordinary seaman in the Royal Navy. Leaving London in May 1824, the expedition reached Lancaster Sound, but they had to winter at the Brodeur Peninsula in the northwest part of Baffin Island, due to ice. Several shore parties explored the region, but there is no record of Abernethy's involvement. When free of ice, they voyaged down Prince Regent Inlet, but Fury became wrecked (at Fury Beach) and Hecla, with both crews, returned to London in October 1825. Abernethy was paid off and left the navy to again become a merchant seaman. He was awarded an Arctic Medal (Note: The Arctic Medal was renamed the Polar Medal in 1904.) for his service when it was instituted in 1857.

=== Towards North Pole ===
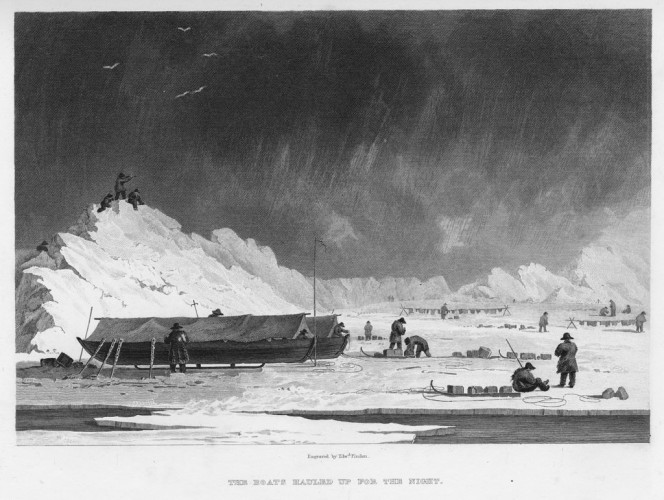
Parry's North Pole expedition

In 1827 Parry again took HMS Hecla, this time in an attempt to reach the North Pole using small boats and sledges. Second in command was James Clark Ross and assistant surgeon was Robert McCormick. Abernethy took part, now promoted to the rank of gunnery petty officer. (Note: Gunner was the second most senior non-commissioned officer, after Master.) Departing London in March 1827, they sailed to Spitsbergen where they found a safe anchorage at Sorgfjorden, Ny-Friesland, in the far north. Abernethy participated in the expedition north, but, beset by difficulties, they turned back at 82°45′ N – a record for furthest north that stood for almost fifty years. On the expedition's return Abernethy was enlisted in the Royal Navy on a permanent basis.

== Arctic, with John Ross, 1829–1833 ==
=== Northwest Passage ===
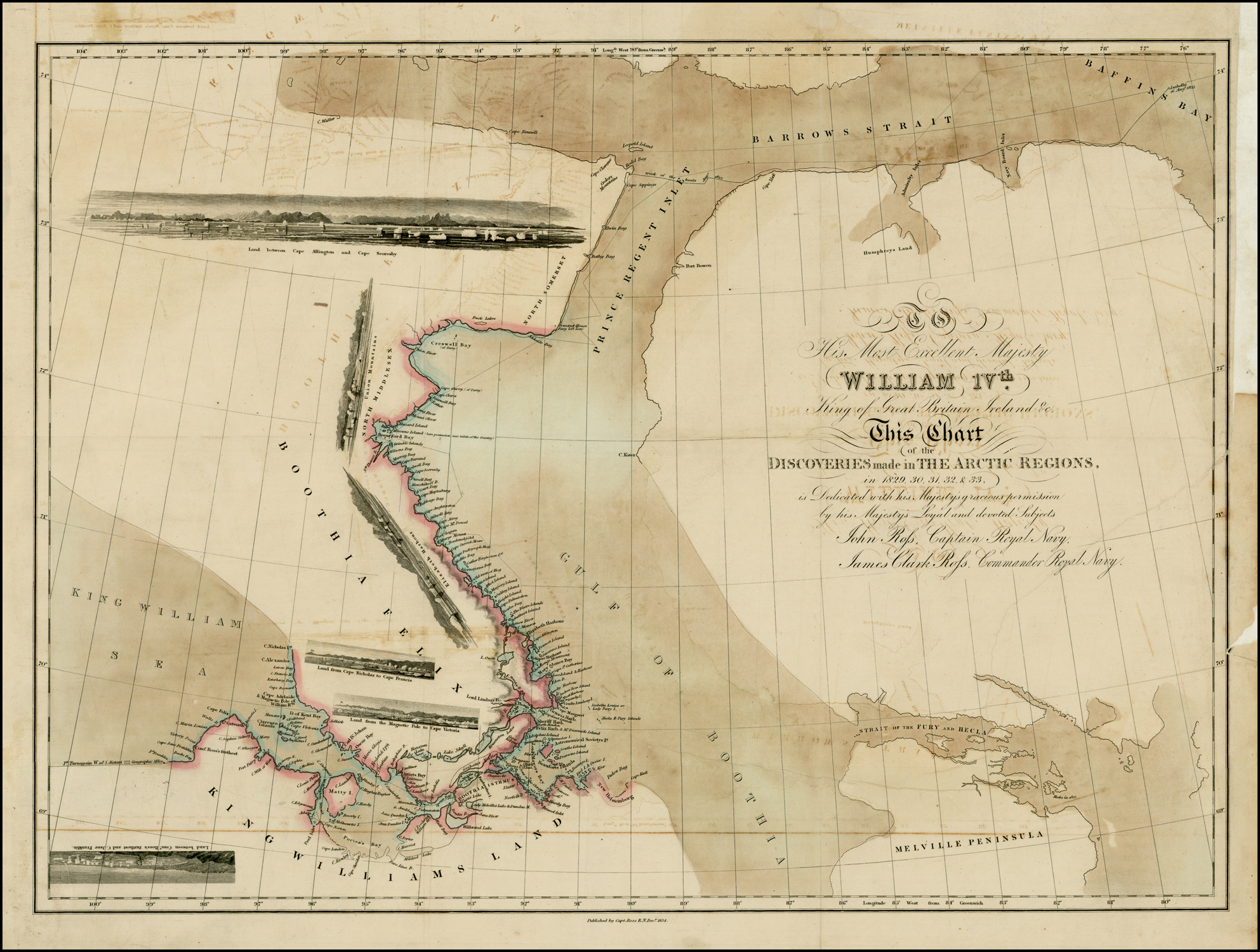
John and James Ross's 1834 map

In 1829, Sir John Ross led another Northwest Passage expedition and appointed Abernethy as second mate to join the crew of Victory, a sailing ship and steam paddle steamer of 30 horsepower. James Clark Ross, Ross's nephew, was second-in-command. By October they had reached Prince Regent Inlet and then far south into the Gulf of Boothia where they anchored for the winter at Felix Harbour.

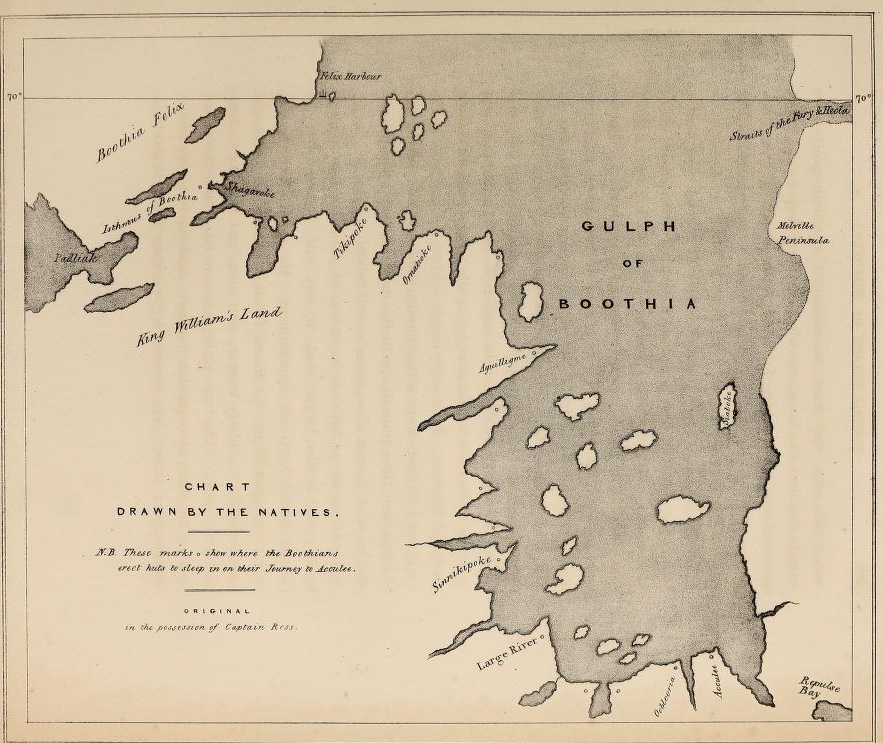
Chart by Inuit of Gulf of Boothia (redrawn for Ross's book)

They formed good relations with the local Inuit who drew knowledgeable maps of the region (Note: The Inuit had a good geographical knowledge for as far away as Hudson Bay.) which showed that there was no seaway to the west from where they were, or any further south in the Gulf although there was a narrow strait to the north (Bellot Strait). Following the guidance of the Inuit they experimented with dog sledges and were able to cross the Boothia Peninsula. A small party led by James Ross, including Abernethy, explored northwards but were unable to locate Bellot Strait. Again James Ross chose Abernethy for a westward expedition starting on 17 May 1830, crossing the Boothia Peninsula and the sea ice of James Ross Strait to King William Island, reaching a point at the north of the island which Ross named after Abernethy. They went a way down the northwest coast of the island and then, 200 miles in a direct line from their ship, they returned on 13 June – after a journey of one month they looked like "human skeletons". Abernethy was on another sledging expedition to the south confirming that there was no way out from the Gulf of Boothia in that direction. Only by September could Victory head north but they only got a few miles before they were frozen in again for the next winter.

=== North Magnetic Pole ===
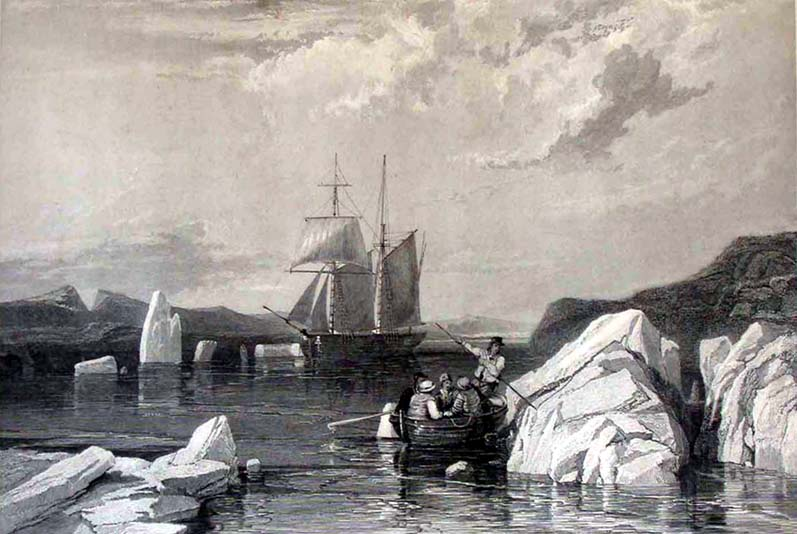
Victory under sail for the last time, 1832

On 15 May 1831 Abernethy was on James Ross's team of six which attempted to reach the North Magnetic Pole. They were equipped with a dip circle and on 1 July they reached 70°5′17″N 96°46′45″W where the angle of dip was 89°59′. For two days they retested using different observers at slightly different locations attaining an average 89°59′28″ so discovering a slight daily change in the position of the magnetic pole. This was the first time the magnetic pole had been reached and, inevitably, they erected the Union Jack. Ross decided to explore a few miles further north before turning back so he chose Abernethy as his sole companion. On returning to the ship Ross named an island they passed after Abernethy. In 21 days they had travelled about 300 miles and the map they had been able to draw remained the standard for over 100 years.

By late August 1831 Victory was free of ice but immediately became trapped again. Through the winter they hunted for food – as well as catching seals Abernethy was good at shooting hares and grouse so becoming called "the gamekeeper". By May 1832 they realised there was little hope of the ship becoming free of the ice that year so they left Victory using their own small boats/sledges hoping to find Fury's boats, abandoned by Parry in 1825.

=== Return home ===
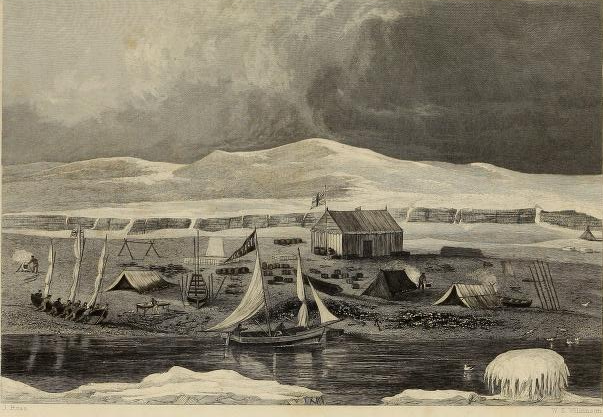
Somerset House in the summer

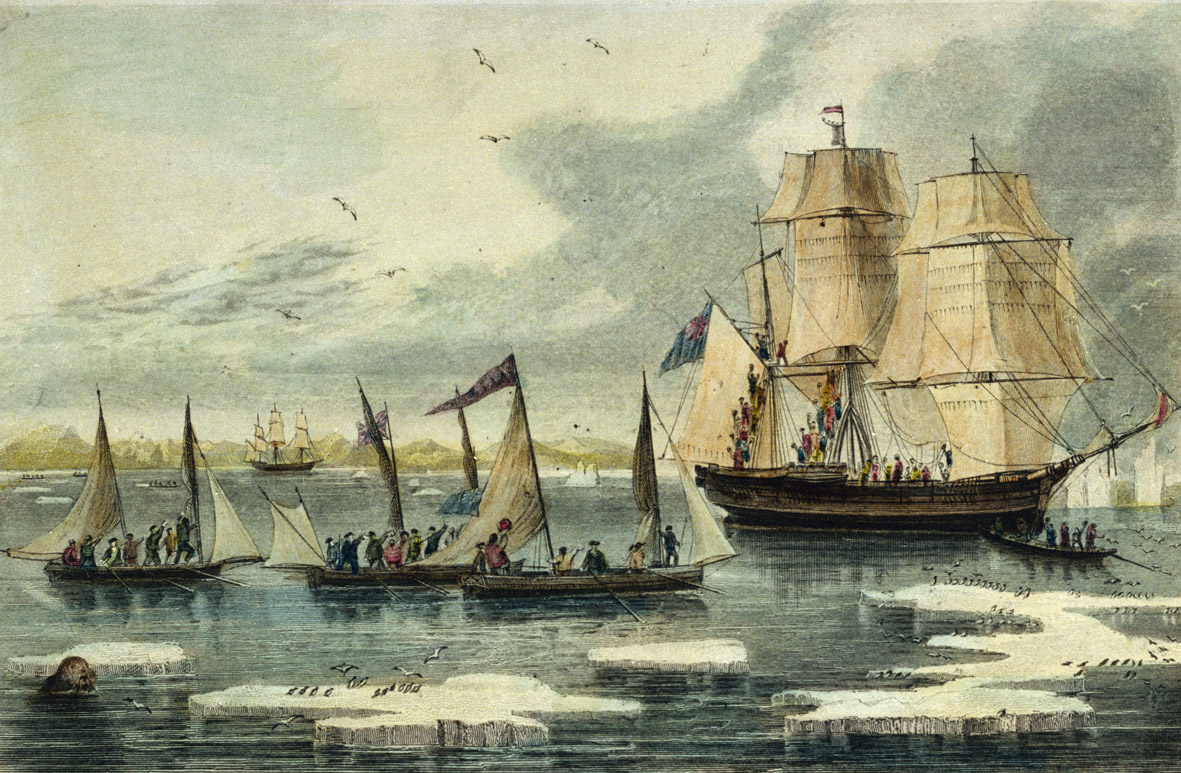
Rescue by the Hull whaler Isabella

A three-strong advance party, including Abernethy, located the scene of Fury's wreckage and the entire expedition was able to use the stores and boats left there and build a substantial shelter, "Somerset House". In July Prince Regent Inlet cleared of ice but by August they found Lancaster Sound completely blocked so they had to return to Fury Beach for the next winter in Somerset House. On 14 August 1833 Abernethy spotted an open lead in the sea ice (Note: A lead is a crack in sea ice sufficiently wide for a ship or boat to pass (with difficulty).) and so they set off rowing at 4:00 next morning, eventually reaching Cape York, the cape at the northwest point of the Brodeur Peninsula. (Note: There are two headlands called "Cape York" in the region: one at the northwest tip of the Brodeur Peninsula and the other Cape York on the northwest coast of Greenland.) At Navy Board Inlet, after a spell of 20 hours continuous rowing, a distant sail was spotted so the men rowed on but the ship sailed out of reach. They then spotted a second ship, also sailing away, but they were spotted and rescued by the Hull whaler Isabella. The captain told them they had been given up for dead two years previously "not by them alone, but by all England". By the time they reached Hull, where they received a civic reception, they had been away for four years and 149 days – Abernethy was paid £329:14:8d in back pay at double rates. John Ross wrote of Abernethy "I have no hesitation in recommending him strongly to the Admiralty ..." so they promoted him to HMS Seringapatam. By now James Ross regarded him as an essential member of any future expedition.

== Antarctica with James Ross, 1839–1843 ==
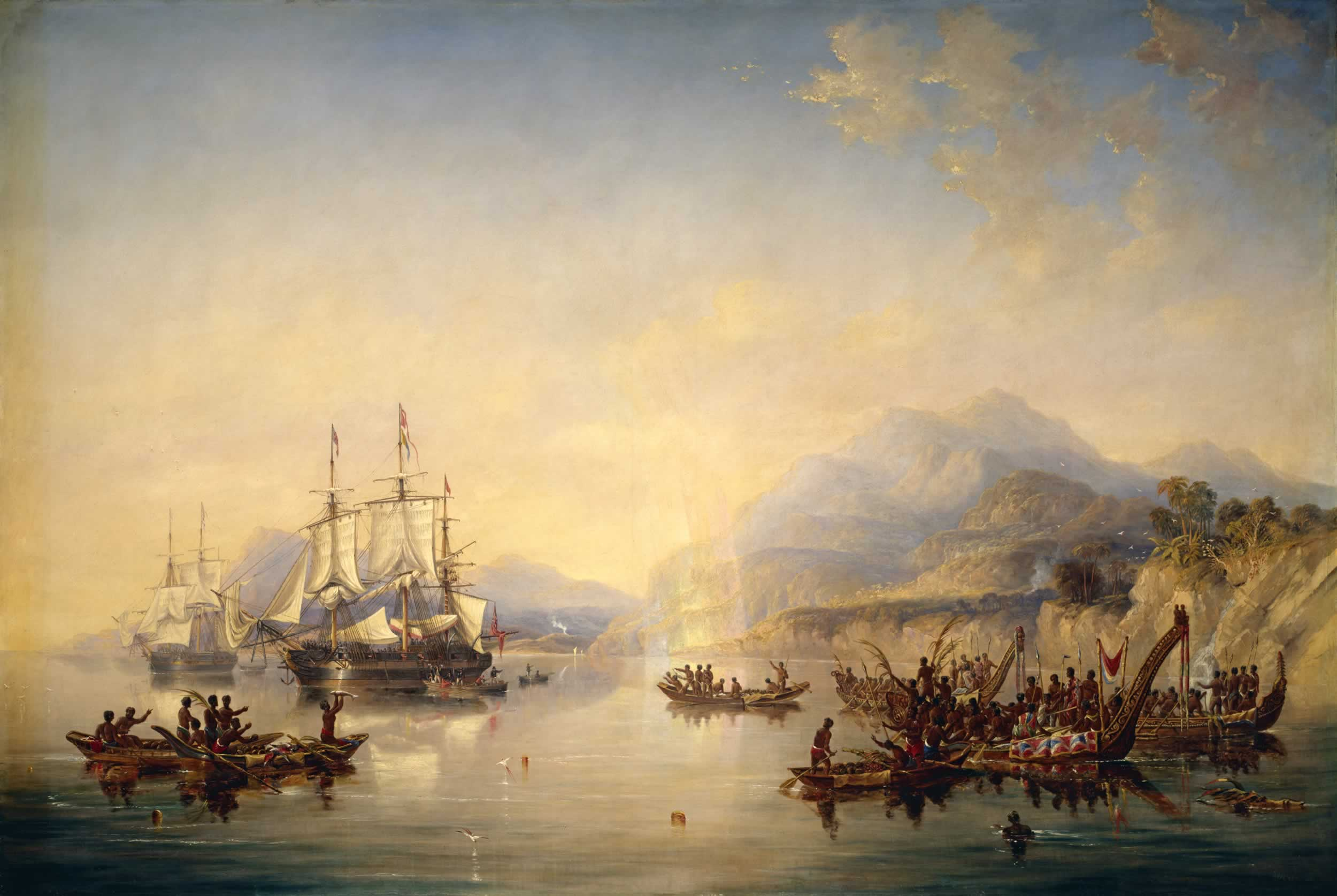
HMS Erebus and HMS Terror in New Zealand

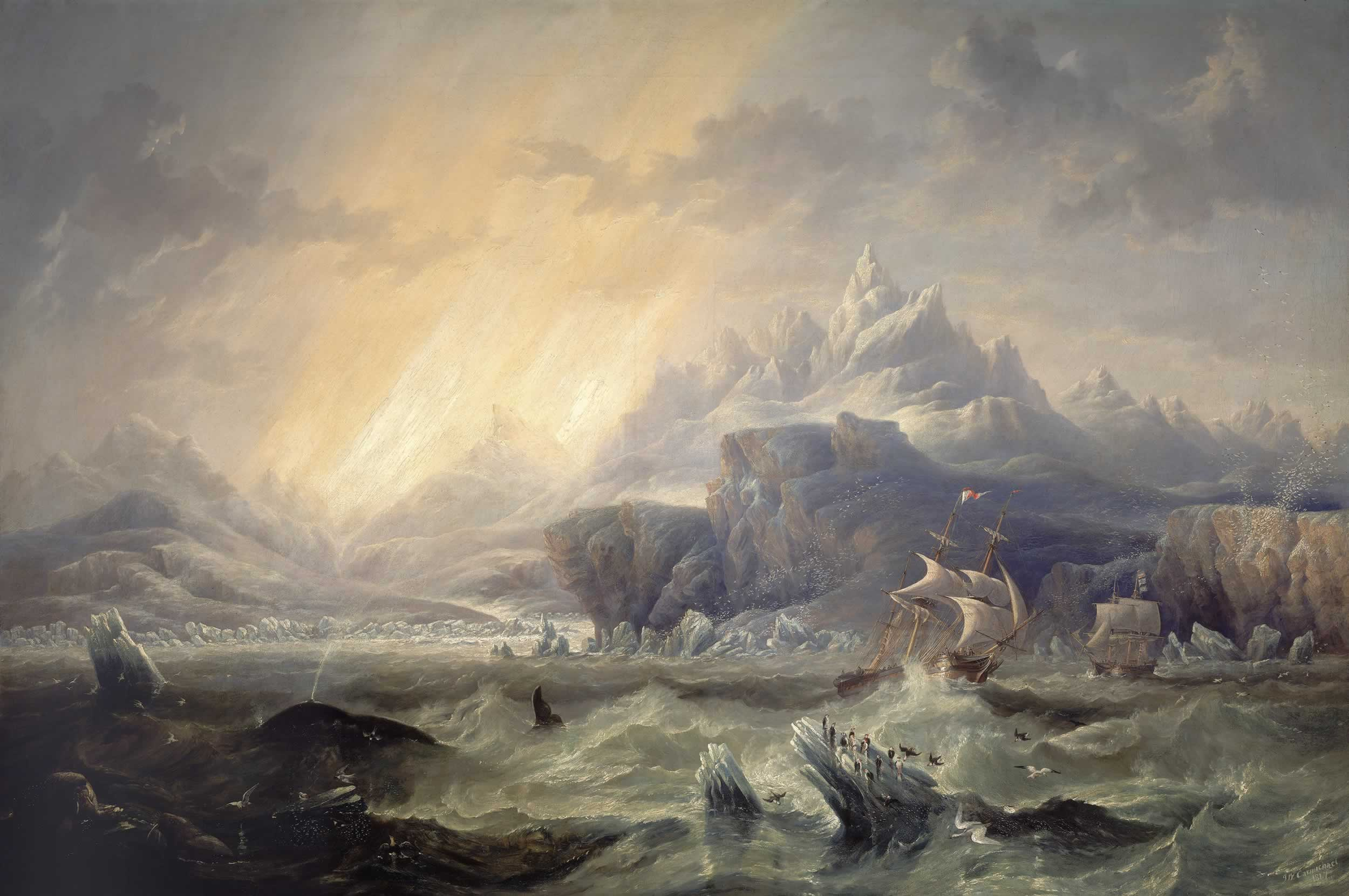
HMS Erebus and HMS Terror in Antarctica

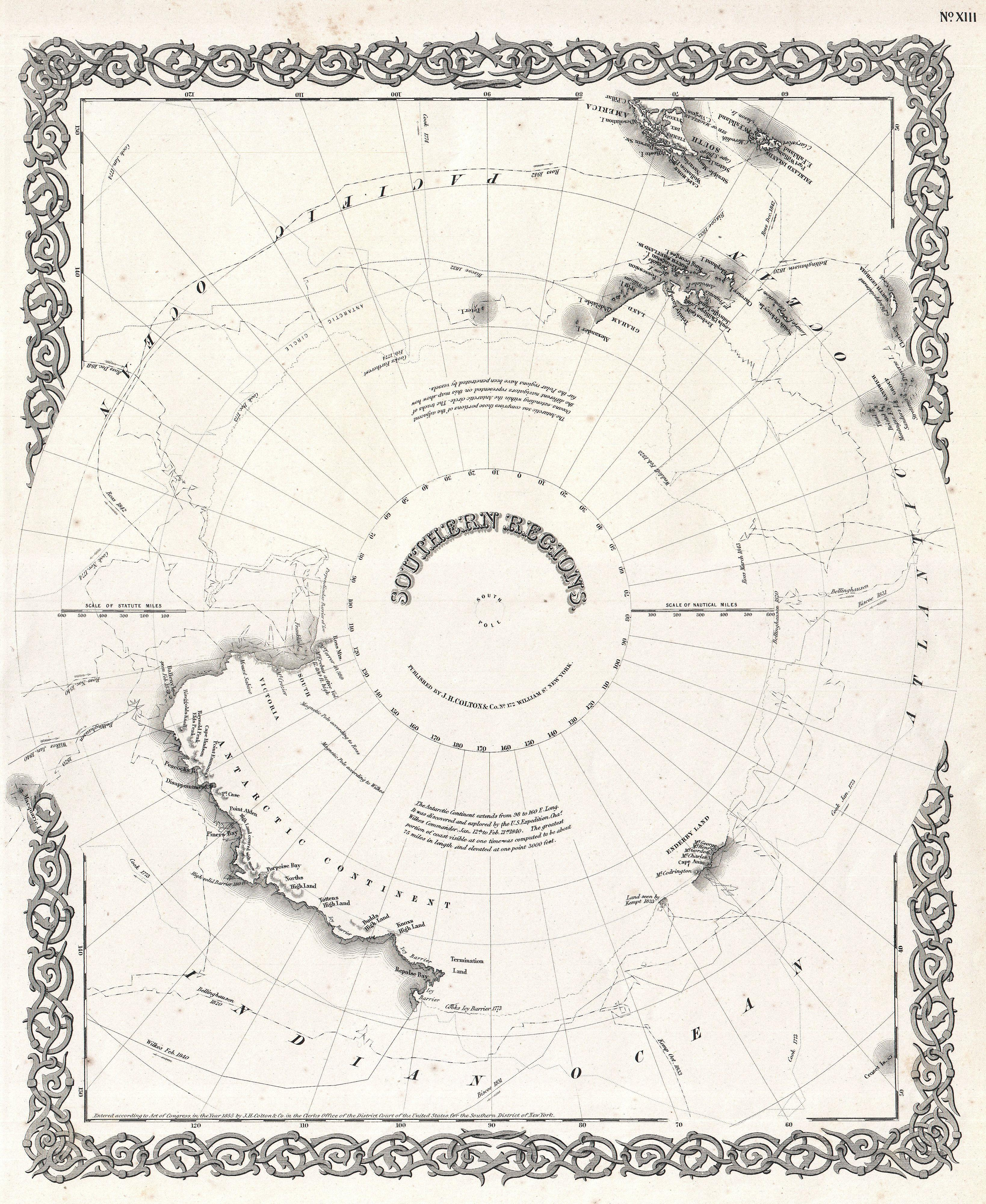
1855 map of Antarctica showing Ross's routes

=== Ross Sea, 1839–1841 ===
With James Ross in command of the ships HMS Erebus and HMS Terror, three-mast barques, Abernethy set off on a scientific expedition to Antarctica in 1839, supported by the Royal Society. Joseph Hooker, later Sir Joseph but then a young naturalist, took part but because it was a naval expedition he had to be appointed as assistant surgeon. Throughout the expedition a major aim was to take magnetic readings at various ports of call starting with Madeira, Tenerife, Cape Verde, Trinidad, St Helena, Cape Town, and the Crozet and Kerguelen islands. In a storm the boatswain was swept off Erebus so two boats were launched to rescue him, unsuccessfully. Abernethy was in command of one boat but, just as it got back to Erebus, the other boat was hit by a wave and all four crew were washed overboard. Abernethy cast off again and was able to rescue them.

When they reached Hobart they learned that the Wilkes expedition and D'Urville expedition had already sighted Antarctica so Ross decided to explore a different unknown region. McCormick (from Parry's north polar days) who was ships' surgeon and Abernethy became close associates – and in New Zealand the pair collected natural history specimens. Ross chose 170°E as the longitude to follow south and this turned out to be the future usual route for Antarctic voyages. The ships headed into what became known as the Ross Sea reaching pack ice at 66°55′S in January 1840 – they then forced their way into the pack ice, the first time this had been attempted. Amundsen wrote "Few people of the present day are capable of rightly appreciating this heroic deed, this brilliant proof of human courage and energy ... These men were heroes ...", and Scott wrote "... all must concede that it deserves to rank among the most brilliant and famous [Antarctic expeditions] that have been made. ... few things could have looked more hopeless than an attack upon the great ice-bound region" They then emerged into open sea at 69°15′S and, sailing further south hoping to reach the South Magnetic Pole, they spotted land and mountains which they named Victoria Land and the Admiralty Range, and cleared Cape Adare. With Abernethy as coxswain their first boat reached a coastal island, Possession Island, but they did not reach the Antarctic mainland. Onward, they crossed the latitude of Weddel's record of furthest south and landed on Franklin Island.

Soon, in the distance, they spotted what McCormick described as "a stupendous volcanic mountain in a high state of activity" and, getting closer, "a dense column of black smoke, intermingled with flashes of red flame". Hooker wrote of "a sight so surpassing everything that can be imagined". Ross named it Mount Erebus, after his ship and the nearby mountain became Mount Terror.

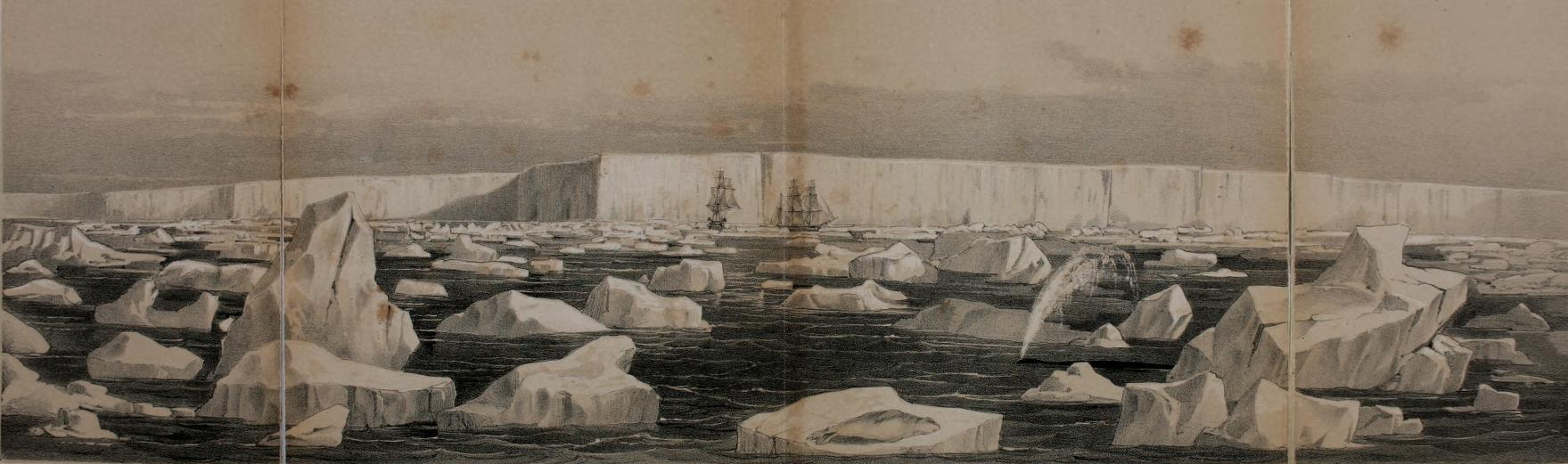
Great Southern Barrier

Sailing east they reached a 200-foot ice cliff which they called the Great Southern Barrier, now the Ross Ice Shelf, and followed it so reaching 78°4′S. By depth sounding adjacent to the ice they determined the ice was floating and was therefore 1000 feet thick. At a low point in the ice cliffs they could see from the masthead "an enormous plain of frosted silver" and they were certain there was no open sea further south. After following the barrier for over 250 miles and with the Antarctic winter approaching they returned to the west but, near Mount Erebus, could not get ashore. They were 160 miles from the south magnetic pole – 700 miles nearer than anyone had been before. After passing Cape Adare, they again succeeded in breaking through the pack ice and reached Tasmania on 6 April 1841 to be greeted by John Franklin and crowds of well-wishers. As it happens Erebus and Terror were the last vessels to navigate the Ross Sea using only sail.

=== Weddell Sea, 1841–1843 ===
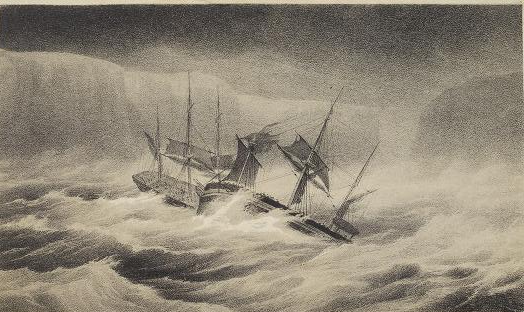
Collision of Erebus and Terror

For more magnetic readings, they left for Sydney in July 1841 continuing to New Zealand's Bay of Islands. In November they set sail south, this time heading south along 146°W hoping to again reach the Ross Ice Shelf. This time they became trapped in the pack ice and it took 58 days to reach through 800 miles of pack to open water. They sighted what became Edward VII Land and, reaching their new furthest south of 78°9′S, they again saw the Ice Shelf. With the sea beginning to freeze solid, Ross headed north and set course for the Falkland Islands. The two ships became pinched between two barrier icebergs and collided several times with both ships severely damaged and facing capsize. Terror managed to sail clear but Erebus was trapped with the only means of escape being to "stern board" (sailing stern first) with Abernethy as ice-master. Abernethy "one of the most experienced icemen of our day – ever vigilant and on the watch" was able to guide them through a gap hardly wider than the ship. At last, after rounding Cape Horn, they reached East Falkland in April 1842 and refitted the ships. For more magnetic readings they sailed for Cape Horn, arriving in September but it was too early in the season to head south again so they took extended readings and then returned to the Falkland Islands, setting off on 17 December down 55°W aiming to reach the Antarctic coast at 40°W through the Weddell Sea. This time they failed to penetrate any distance into the pack ice so they retreated, heading for the Cape of Good Hope arriving in April 1843, and sailing home via St Helena, Ascension Island and Rio de Janeiro. They arrived back in England on 23 September 1843, after which Abernethy has been briefly lost to history.

== Searches for John Franklin's lost expedition party ==
=== With James Ross, 1848–1849 ===
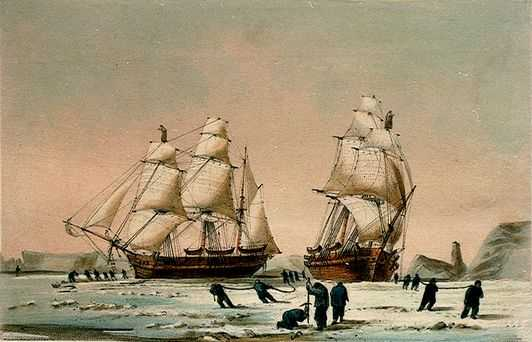
HMS Enterprise and HMS Investigator

In 1845 Sir John Franklin commanded an expedition along with Francis Crozier who had been on Ross's Antarctic expedition, again using Erebus and Terror, and again trying to find a Northwest Passage. In what became known as Franklin's lost expedition, both ships were eventually lost and 129 men were to die but Abernethy had not been included in the vast crew. By 1847 fears developed over what had happened so in 1848 three expeditions set off to search for Franklin, the main one commanded by James Ross in HMS Enterprise, with Robert McClure, Francis McClintock and Abernethy as icemaster; and HMS Investigator. The ships were accompanied by steam pinnaces. The ice was exceptionally bad in Lancaster Sound but they were able to winter at Port Leopold. Early next season they carefully checked in Peel Sound by sledge, not realising this had actually been Franklin's route, and returned to Enterprise after 500 miles and 39 days. Ross presumed Franklin had got beyond Melville Island from where he would try and escape south to a region covered by one of the other search expeditions. Only by 28 August 1849 after they had sawed a two-mile canal could their ship be freed from the ice but to the west they found continuous ice. Although trapped, the ships drifted east for 250 miles at about 10 miles per day from where, starting on 24 September, they headed home.

=== With John Ross, 1850–1851 ===
The Admiralty offered rewards for finding (or even hearing news of) Franklin so the 73-year-old John Ross set off with Felix, a steam schooner, with Abernethy as master of the vessel. At this time he was describing Abernethy as "my old shipmate". Ross sought Abernethy's advice about crew which led to many of Abernethy's relatives being signed on. Felix left Ayr on 20 May 1850 but at Loch Ryan in a near mutiny many of the crew had gone ashore and got drunk so Ross had to leave eight of them behind, including Abernethy himself. A letter from Ross to the Hudson's Bay Company and a report in the Shipping Gazette were bitterly critical of Abernethy, blaming him for instigating the whole thing. All the same, Felix set sail with Abernethy again on board.

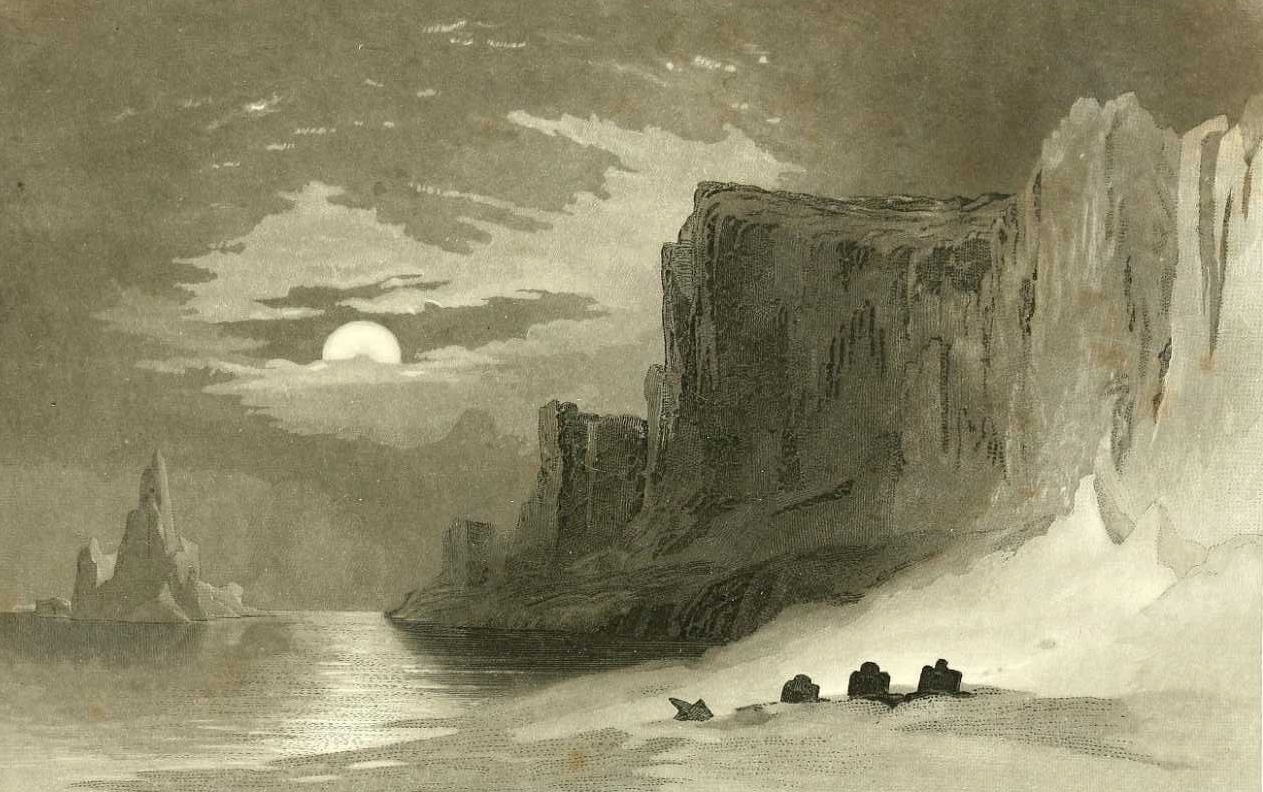
Graves on Beechey Island

Meeting other search ships off Cape York (the cape on the northwest coast of Greenland), it was found that translations of different local Inuit accounts variously said that nearby Franklin's party had not been seen at all or that everyone had been murdered. At the later official Admiralty Board of Enquiry Abernethy said he had never believed the murder story. Ross credited Abernethy and Charles Phillips with finding the graves of three of Franklin's men near the shore of Beechey Island at the entrance to Wellington Channel although Phillips later said he had been called to the scene. (Note: The graves, all showing deaths early in 1846, were of William Braine, John Hartnell and John Torrington.) Ross wintered on Cornwallis Island and next year searched the island and Wellington Channel. Again Ross found Abernethy drunk and his spirit allowance was stopped – later in an open letter to the Nautical Standard and Steam Navigation Gazette Ross said he had lost all confidence in Abernethy due to his insubordination and intemperance. In August 1851 when the ice melted they returned home with Ross saying "we parted good friends at last".

=== With Edward Inglefield, 1852 ===
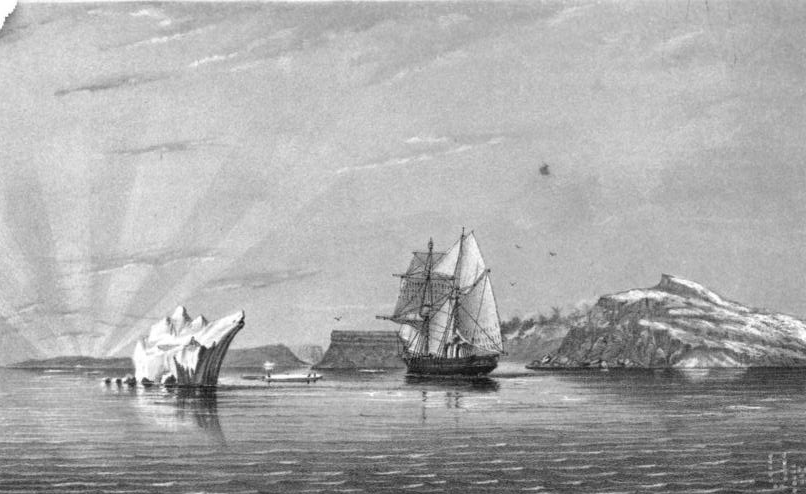
Isabel in Smith Sound

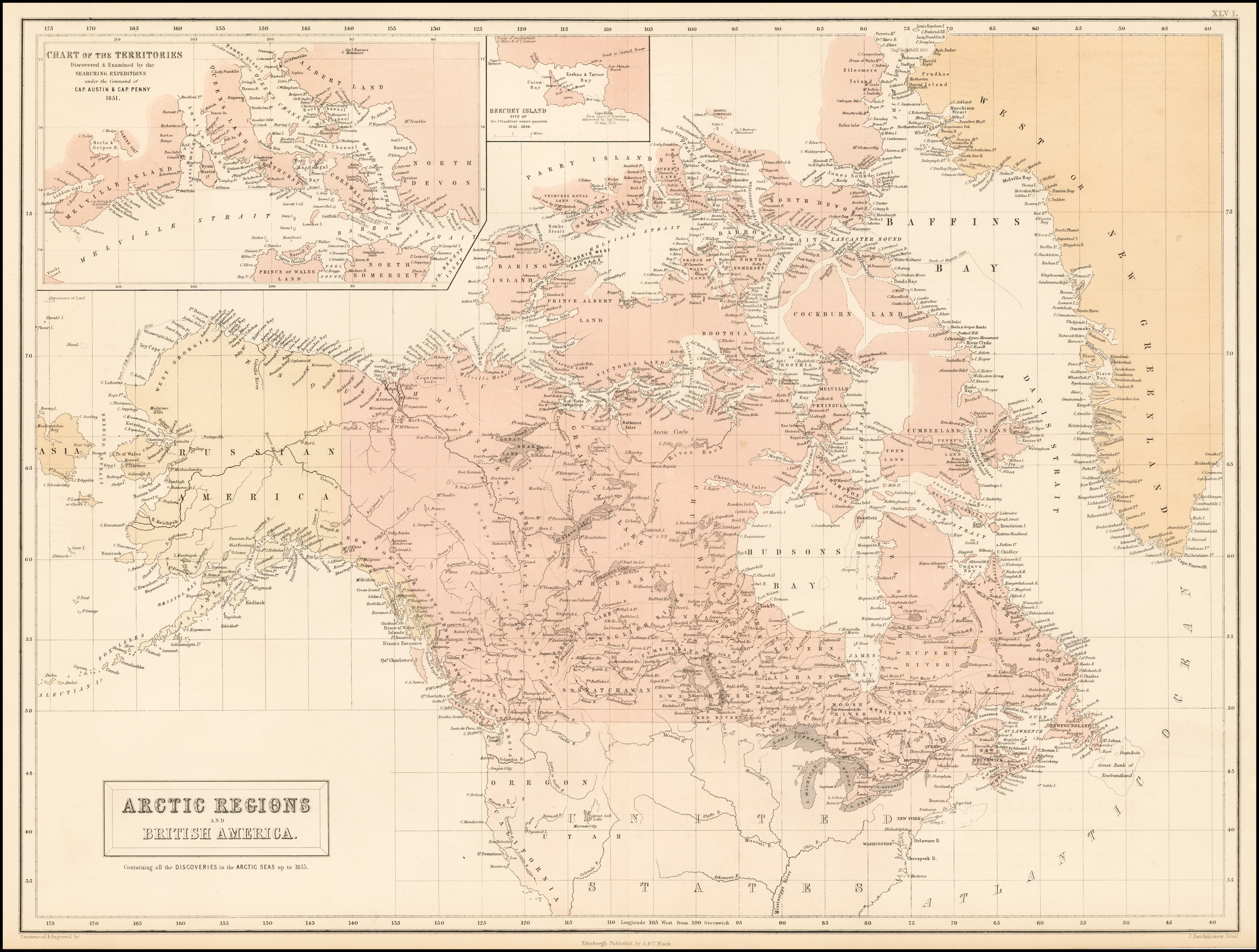
1854 map of Arctic regions

In 1852, succumbing to public pressure, the Admiralty dispatched five search vessels on a new expedition and Lady Franklin funded a sixth vessel, her own steam yacht Isabel, a two-masted brigantine, under Edward Inglefield. Abernethy was ice master and second in command of Isabel. Contrary to instructions Inglefield explored around Baffin Bay and reached Wolstenholme Bay, near Cape York, where Franklin and his men had supposedly been murdered. However, they found nothing suspicious buried in the cairn that had been said to be their burial place. Sailing on north they reached Smith Sound and discovered it provided a hitherto unknown entrance to the Arctic Ocean. On 29 August, with a heavy swell, thick fog, and ice forming, on Abernethy's advice that they only had four or five days before they would be trapped, they turned to the south and reached Beechey Island to leave surplus stores for the ships there. They left earlier on the same day that McCormick arrived – in his book McCormick wrote of his disappointment about having missed his "old shipmate and friend at both the Poles, Abernethy." After surviving severe storms they abandoned the thought of overwintering and in ferocious weather returned home in November 1852.

== Death, assessments and legacy ==
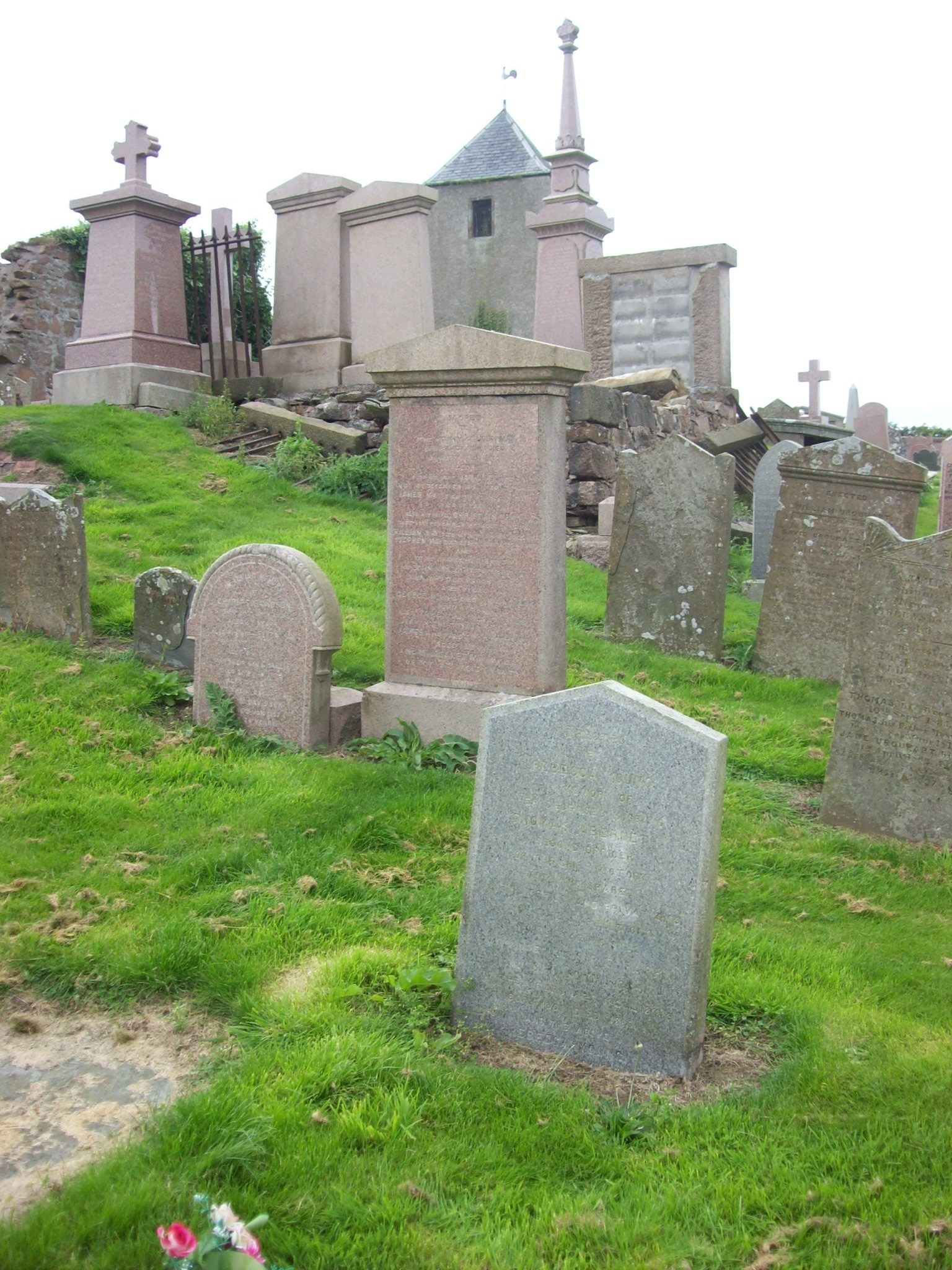
Abernethy's grave (grey granite in foreground)

For most of Abernethy's married life he had been away at sea. In 1854 his wife Barbara died, aged 44, with her husband at her side, and Abernethy returned to live in Peterhead. In 1857 he married Rebecca Young but he was only to live for another three years. He died of "ulcersation of the stomach" on 13 April 1860 and his wife erected a gravestone in Peterhead Old Kirkyard. The local newspaper carried a very brief death notice. (Note: "At Queen Street on the 13th. Inst., Mr. Thomas Abernethy (one of the crew who accompanied Sir J. Ross in his Arctic Expeditions) aged 57 years.")

According to Alex Buchan, Abernethy's biographer, in the 19th century Royal Naval officers were almost always from the landed gentry and they had purchased their commissions. Certain of their superiority, they wrote accounts of their expeditions keeping the credit for themselves. Indeed, at the end of an expedition, commanders often required any records kept by the crew to be given to them for inclusion at their discretion in the official report. Possibly because of this Abernethy left no written records. According to Sir Joseph Hooker, a distinguished scientist, concerning crewmen, "And where have you seen or heard that their services are in the least appreciated? The Admiralty have not as much as sent a letter of thanks to the men".

Although Abernethy has largely disappeared from history his contributions were sufficiently outstanding for accounts to have been left of him, even though he was neither an officer nor a gentleman. Sir Clements Markham, who had been president of the Royal Geographical Society and who had known Abernethy well, wrote in 1921 "The gunner of the Erebus must not be left out, as he was a very exceptional character and had very wide Arctic experience ... Abernethy was a splendid seaman". In 1828 Sir John Ross had described him as "the most steady and active, as well as the most powerful man in the ship". (Note: These were the words of the man who in 1832 wrote "'The men' as they are called, are not much given to thinking, it is certain; though seamen of the present day (and am sorry to say it), think more than they did in the days of my junior service, and most assuredly and certainly, are 'all the worse' for it ..." [sic].) Three capes were named after Abernethy: in Wolstenholme Fjord in Baffin Bay, on King William Island, and on an island west of Ellesmere Island. In 1983 Abernethy Flats on James Ross Island (Note: James Ross Island is not to be confused with Ross Island, both in the same sector of Antarctica.) was also given his name. His gravestone still stands and in 2016 his biography was published.
