= Shore Leave =

Shore Leave may refer to:

- Shore leave, the leave that professional sailors get to spend on dry land
- Shore Leave (1925 film), an American silent comedy
- Shore Leave (1962 film), a Soviet film directed by Feliks Mironer
- "Shore Leave" (Star Trek: The Original Series), a 1966 television episode
- Shore Leave, a Venture Brothers character parodying Shipwreck (G.I. Joe)

== See also ==
- Shore lead, oceanographic term for a waterway opening between pack ice and shore
