= Bernier Bay =

Bay in Nunavut, Canada

- Location within Nunavut
- Location: Baffin Island
- Coordinates: 71°05′N 088°15′W
- Basin countries: Canada
- Settlements: Uninhabited

Bernier Bay is an Arctic waterway in the Qikiqtaaluk Region, Nunavut, Canada. It is located in the Gulf of Boothia, on the western edge of Baffin Island, and south of the Brodeur Peninsula. A narrow isthmus separates the east end of Bernier Bay from the west end of the Berlinguet Inlet, which is itself at the south end of Admiralty Inlet, which runs south through Baffin Island from Lancaster Sound.
