= Baring Bay =

Bay in Nunavut, Canada

- Location within Nunavut
- Location: Wellington Channel
- Coordinates: 75°40′N 92°03′W
- Ocean/sea sources: Arctic Ocean
- Basin countries: Canada
- Settlements: Uninhabited

Baring Bay is an Arctic waterway in the Qikiqtaaluk Region, Nunavut, Canada. It lies off the southwestern coast of Devon Island in the eastern high Arctic. Like Macormick Bay to the south, it is an arm of Wellington Channel.

It was named in 1850–1852 in honour of Sir Francis Thornhill Baring (1796–1866), then First Lord of the Admiralty, along with Baring Strait (now Northumberland Sound), Baring Land and Baring Island (now Banks Island). Baring Cape (the northwest point of Victoria Island) and Baring Channel (between the islands of Russell and Prince of Wales) were also named in his honour, but later.

== History ==
In August 1852, Baring Bay was the starting point of an expedition headed by Dr. Robert McCormick in search for Sir John Franklin and his missing expedition.
