= Lavoie Islands =

Island group in Nunavut, Canada

- Location within Nunavut Location within Canada

Geography
- Location: Bernier Bay
- Coordinates: 71°03′N 87°37′W

Administration
- Canada
- Nunavut: Nunavut
- Region: Qikiqtaaluk

Demographics
- Population: Uninhabited
- Source: Lavoie Islands at Atlas of Canada

One of the uninhabited Baffin Island offshore island groups, the Lavoie Islands are located at the head of the Bernier Bay, approximately 80 km (50 mi) from its opening into eastern Gulf of Boothia. The islands are part of the Qikiqtaaluk Region, in the Canadian territory of Nunavut.
