= Berlinguet Inlet =

Body of water in the Qikiqtaaluk Region of Nunavut, Canada

Coordinates: 71°10′N 085°50′W

Berlinguet Inlet is a body of water adjoining Baffin Island within the Qikiqtaaluk Region of Nunavut, Canada. It runs west–east at Admiralty Inlet's southern end, separated from Bernier Bay to the west, which opens into the Gulf of Boothia, by a 1.5 km (0.93 mi) isthmus. Baffin Island's Brodeur Peninsula is to the north; Borden Peninsula is to the northeast.

== Geography ==
Characterized by sedge, grass meadows, and a freshwater lake, the inlet area is 11,141 km^{2} (4,302 sq mi) in size, and rises to an elevation of 300 m (980 ft) above sea level.

== Fauna ==
Berlinguet Inlet is a Canadian Important Bird Area site (#NU066). The Canadian Wildlife Service has also classified the area as a Key Habitat Site for migratory birds. Notable species include fulmar, gull, peregrine falcon, sea duck, and tern. The C. c. atlanticus (greater snow goose) population in Berlinguet Inlet is the second largest in Canada.

Bearded seals, ringed seals, and polar bears frequent the area.
