= Mid-Labrador Ridge =

Mid-ocean ridge in the Labrador Sea

The Mid-Labrador Ridge was a mid-ocean ridge in the Labrador Sea that represented a divergent boundary between the Greenland and North American plates during the Paleogene. The ridge extended from the South Greenland triple junction in the southeast to the Davis Strait area in the northwest. Seafloor spreading along the Mid-Labrador Ridge discontinued about 40 million years ago when the mid-ocean ridge became essentially extinct.

The Mid-Labrador Ridge is now mostly buried under sediment, exposed only as a northwesterly trend of seamounts in the southeastern part of the Labrador Basin.
