= Macormick Bay =

Bay in Nunavut, Canada

- Location within Nunavut
- Location: Wellington Channel
- Coordinates: 75°22′N 92°23′W
- Ocean/sea sources: Arctic Ocean
- Basin countries: Canada
- Settlements: Uninhabited

Macormick Bay (alternate: McCormick Bay) is an Arctic waterway in the Qikiqtaaluk Region, Nunavut, Canada. It lies off the southwestern coast of Devon Island in the eastern high Arctic. Like Baring Bay to the north, it is an arm of Wellington Channel.

It is named in honor of Dr. Robert McCormick, a British Royal Navy surgeon, explorer and naturalist who searched nearby for the lost expedition of Sir John Franklin.

== Geography ==
Macormick Bay's cliffs are characterized by Silurian limestone.

Snowblind Bay on Cornwallis Island, to the west, has similar red strata beds.
