= Isabel (1850 ship) =

British vessel launched in 1850

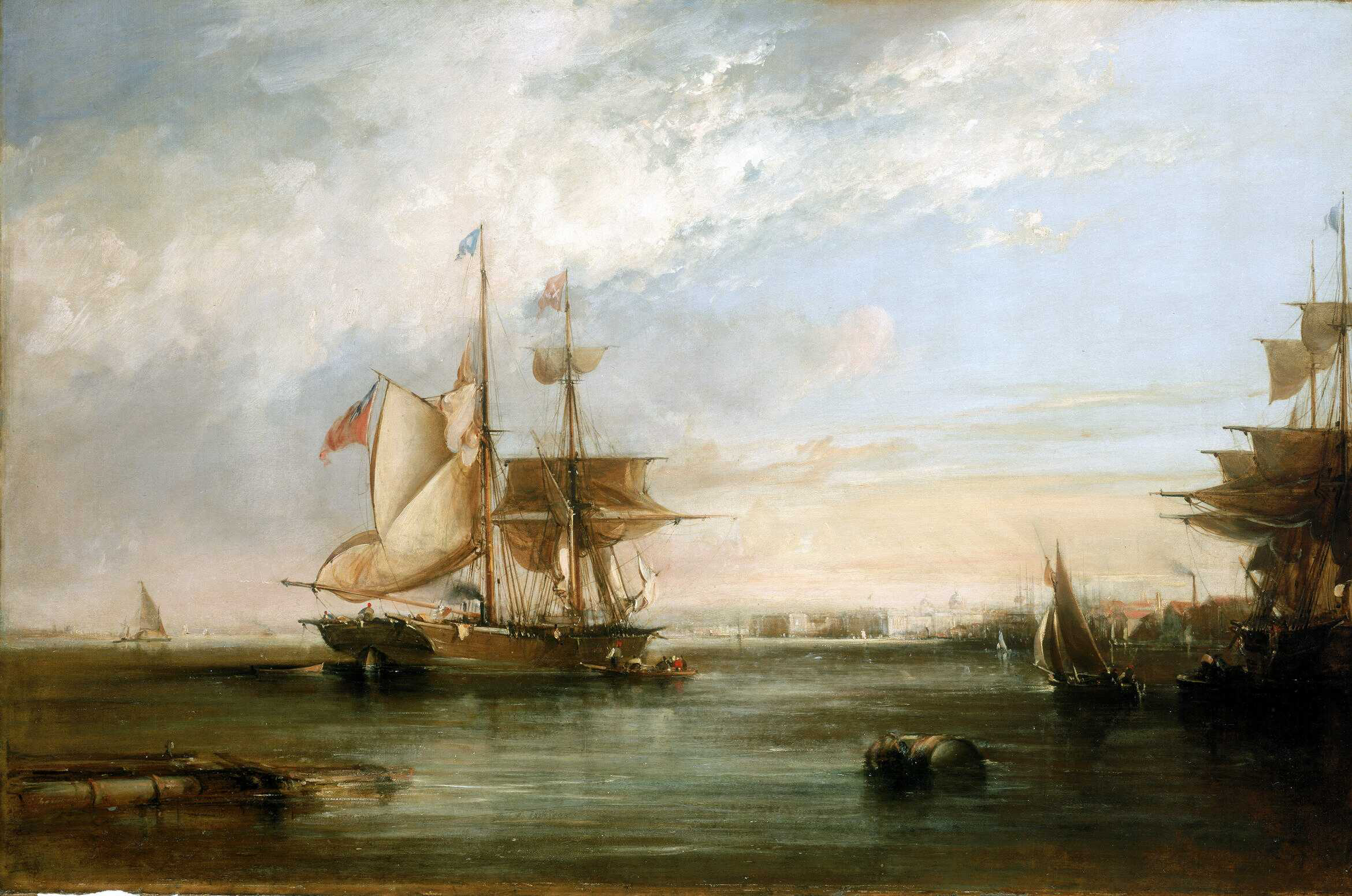
- Isabel Lying off Deptford, London

History

United Kingdom
- Builder: Hilary McIsaac, at St Peter's Bay, Prince Edward Island
- Launched: 1850

General characteristics
- Class & type: Auxiliary steamship
- Tons burthen: 149 net register
- Length: 86.5 ft (26.4 m)
- Beam: 22.9 ft (7.0 m)
- Depth of hold: 11.9 ft (3.63 m)
- Propulsion: Sails and steam (16 nominal horse power V-twin)
- Sail plan: 2-masted brigantine rigged
- Complement: 18

Isabel was a vessel intended to be used in four planned expeditions in search of the fate of Franklin's lost expedition between 1852 and 1856, although she only managed to reach the Arctic once, in 1852. All of these expeditions were sponsored by Lady Jane Franklin who also owned the vessel over most of this period, and expended much money for little result.

The Isabel was a nearly-new sailing vessel when Donald Beatson purchased her in 1851 for a proposed expedition to the Arctic via the Bering Straits. Lady Franklin became one of the major sponsors of the expedition, but lack of funds forced Beatson to withdraw from the project in April 1852.

Lady Franklin became the ship's owner and, it being too late to reach the Bering Straits in time for the following summer, arranged for the vessel to make a brief sortie to the coast of Greenland under Edward Inglefield, RN, with Thomas Abernethy as his ice master, later that year.

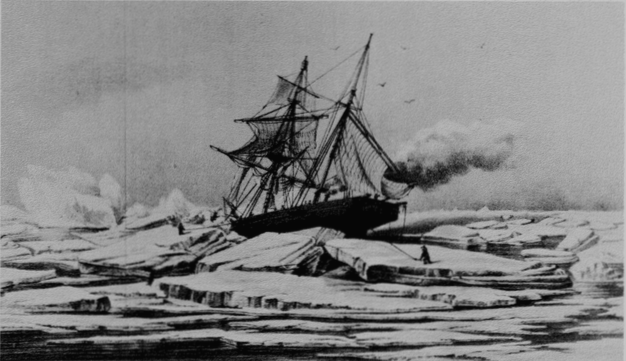
Isabel caught in the ice pack

Public subscriptions, including over £1671 from Van Diemens Land received early in 1853, allowed Lady Franklin to send the Isabel for the Bering Straits under William Kennedy, who had been commander of her previous expedition using the ketch Prince Albert in 1851. The sailing master was Robert Grate, who had been a crewman on the first Prince Albert expedition in 1850, and sailing master on the second.

However, Grate and most of the crew mutinied at Valparaíso in August 1853, on the grounds that they believed the vessel was too small and unsuitable for the mission. After two years trading on the South American coast in the hope of finding another crew for the Bering Straits, Kennedy returned the ship to England in 1855.

After preparations were begun late in 1856 to send Isabel back to the Arctic via Baffin Bay, Lady Franklin was finally convinced that the ship was unsuitable. After unsuccessful efforts were made to acquire HMS Resolute, Isabel was sold and replaced by the auxiliary steamship Fox. Isabel later became the tender to the Arctic whaler Emma.

Her engine was later removed, and Isabel was still in service as a sailing vessel, owned by G. Sinclair of Aberdeen, in the 1880s.
