= South Greenland triple junction =

Meeting point of three tectonic plates

The South Greenland triple junction was a geologic triple junction in the North Atlantic Ocean that divided the North American, Greenland and Eurasian plates. It existed during the Paleogene and consisted of the Mid-Labrador and Mid-Atlantic ridges. The triple junction became extinct when seafloor spreading along the Mid-Labrador Ridge ceased during the Eocene.
