= Queen Elizabeth Islands Subplate =

Small tectonic plate containing the Queen Elizabeth Islands of Northern Canada

The Queen Elizabeth Islands Subplate is a triangular tectonic block of the North American Plate containing the Queen Elizabeth Islands of Northern Canada. It is surrounded on the south and southwest by the Parry Rift Valley, on the east by the Nares Rift Valley and on the north and west by the Kaltag Fault, which form part of the Canadian Arctic Rift System.

The Queen Elizabeth Islands Subplate formed in the mid-Tertiary during the final stages of the Eurekan Rifting Episode when a large triangular region became severed from the rest of the North American continent. It consists of a number of smaller subplates that are separated by faults. The faults controlled the shapes of the subplates which in turn determined the shapes of the present day islands.
