= Lancaster Aulacogen =

Geological structure in the Arctic Archipelago of Nunavut, Canada

The Lancaster Aulacogen is a geological structure underlying Lancaster Sound and Prince Regent Inlet in the Arctic Archipelago of Nunavut, Canada. It formed as a result of extensional tectonics during the Eurekan Rifting Episode, which took place in the Canadian Arctic Rift System from the Cretaceous to the Tertiary.
