= Eurekan orogeny =

Phanerozoic mountain building event that affected northernmost North America

The Eurekan orogeny was a Phanerozoic mountain building event that affected the eastern portion of the Arctic Archipelago and, to a lesser extent, northern Greenland. Deformation initiated in the Late Cretaceous, during which the Sverdrup Basin began to fragment and fold in response to the counterclockwise rotation of Greenland, caused by seafloor spreading in the Canadian Arctic Rift System. Isostatic uplift was most pronounced in the Grantland Mountains and Victoria and Albert Mountains on Ellesmere Island and in the Princess Margaret Range on Axel Heiberg Island, as evidenced by the current physiography. Compression in a broad zone on Ellesmere Island resulted in the formation of the Eurekan Fold Belt.

The Eurekan orogeny came to an end when seafloor spreading in the Labrador Sea ceased about 33 million years ago during the Oligocene epoch. Erosion of the orogenic mountains followed, resulting in the deposition of undeformed sediment above the eroded remnants of deformed rock. At least some of the coarse clastic sediments in the Beaufort Formation were derived from the Grantland Mountains and Princess Margaret Range, suggesting that these ranges had higher elevations during the Late Miocene or Early Pliocene times.
