= Geology of Prince Edward Island =

The geology of Prince Edward Island formed as a result of strike-slip extension in the mountains formed by the Taconic orogeny, Salinic orogeny, and Acadian orogeny, which created an area of subsidence in the Gulf of St. Lawrence. The Maritime Rift resulted in the Magdalen Basin, which is actually a series of small basins surrounding the Gulf. In the Permian coal swamps formed in these basins, resulting in Atlantic Canada's extensive coal deposits, while in some cases, the swamps evaporated were replaced by gypsum evaporite. Up to 12 kilometers of late Paleozoic sediments filled the Maritime Rift as rivers transported sediments in from more distant highlands. The rock visible at the surface on Prince Edward Island is principally red sandstone and siltstone deposited during this period.
