= Geology of Newfoundland and Labrador =

The geology of Newfoundland and Labrador includes basement rocks formed as part of the Grenville Province in the west and Labrador and the Avalonian microcontinent in the east. Extensive tectonic changes, metamorphism and volcanic activity have formed the region throughout Earth history.

== Newfoundland ==
In contrast to neighboring Labrador, the island of Newfoundland is largely underlain by younger rocks. The Churchill, Nain, Superior and Grenville Province present in Labrador were all small continents or pieces of continental lithosphere that joined to form sections of the proto-North American continent Laurentia and the broad stable region known as the Canadian Shield. By the end of the Precambrian in the Neoproterozoic, continental crust which had come into existence in the Archean nearly 2.5 billion years had already experienced up to eight supercontinent cycles.

In the late Precambrian and Paleozoic, Avalonia (named after the Avalon Peninsula in Newfoundland) formed as a volcanic island arc off the coast of the supercontinents Pannotia which lost land through rifting and became Gondwana. This volcanic island arc was later split into different areas, but currently underlies southern New England, Maine, Nova Scotia, Prince Edward Island, southern New Brunswick, southern Ireland, England, Wales, Belgium, the Netherlands and much of north Germany. Northwest Newfoundland includes older rocks affected by the Grenville orogeny in the late Proterozoic during the collision of continents to form the previous supercontinent Rodinia.

Examples of ancient rocks from this period include the late Precambrian Harbour Main Group ignimbrite and ash flow tuff with obsidian and augite in the center of the Avalon Peninsula. Rocks of similar age were forming on Grenville Province basement rock in what would become western Newfoundland, such as the Round Pond Granite formed 602 million years ago. Sedimentary and volcanic rocks 15 kilometers thick are exposed in the Avalon Peninsula, deposited in rift basins as flysch and molasse with volcaniclastic rocks in submarine fans. The Gaskiers Formation holds diamictite that may have formed during the Snowball Earth glaciations and Ediacaran fossils and microfossils have been found in some rocks. Northern Newfoundland at the edge of the Laurentian continent witnessed columnar flood basalts in the Cloud Hills area into the Cambrian.

The Avalon Zone is an area of 550 million year old sedimentary and volcanic rocks exposed only in the east that preserves the original geology of the microcontinent and extends 600 kilometers out to sea forming the below water Flemish Cap.

By the early Devonian, the Avalonia microcontinent and the Bronson Hill island arc, collided with Laurentia to form the mid-sized continent Euramerica, causing the Taconic orogeny. The collision closed the Iapetus Ocean and obducted the Laurentian continental margin under the two island arcs. The process produced a strange bulged up area of mantle material to the surface as peridotite in Gros Morne National Park, essentially the only area on the Earth's surface where mantle material is present as cool, crystallized rock. It also created an ophiolite zone where oceanic crust was preserved on land.

Geologists group the rocks in this area into the Humber Zone and the Dunnage Zone, with the Dunnage Zone's southern edge defined by the Gander River Ultrabasic Belt. The neighboring Gander Zone has siltstone, shale and quartz sandstone as well as deformed rocks and granite. The sediments were deposited on the continental margin during the closure of the Iapetus Ocean.

By 356 million years ago, Gondwana collided with Euramerica, closing the Rheic Ocean and creating the supercontinent Pangea, which left Newfoundland and the Avalonian microcontinent (also known as terrane) far inland and brought widespread interior desert conditions around the world. Newfoundland was re-exposed to the ocean in the Triassic when rifting began to form new oceanic crust and opened the Atlantic Ocean.

== Labrador ==
Labrador is part of the eastern Canadian Shield and intrusive igneous or metamorphic rocks are the most common, with sedimentary rocks in some areas. Four of the seven Canadian Shield provinces make up Labrador. Archean age rocks and east-west structural trends mark the Superior Province (a small area in the west near Quebec) which encompasses the Ashuanipi Complex granulite and granodiorite intruded by pyroxene-rich felsic plutons. The Nain Province runs along the northeast coast and also has Archean-age rocks, although a greater northward trend. The only exception is gneiss overlain by metasedimentary and metavolcanic rocks in the southeast, which were recrystallized and metamorphosed during 1.42 billion year old orogeny. A major anorthosite-adamellite pluton intrudes the province. South of the Davis Inlet, the Hopedale Gneiss is the defining rock unit.

Nain Archean gneiss is overlain to the north of the community of Nain, Newfoundland and Labrador by the undeformed Ramah Group shale, sandstone and quartzite from the Aphebian. The Mugford Group tholeiite basalts and pyroclastic flows overlie similar sedimentary rocks. The volcanic rocks are between 1.49 and 2.3 billion years old. The Nain Province is subdivided into the Makkovik-subprovince, which is mainly made up of the 25,000 foot thick Aillik Group quartzofeldspathic, argillite, limestone, conglomerate, paragneiss and iron formations.

The Churchill Province is situated inland in north-central Labrador and was deformed during the Hudsonian orogeny. Anorthosite intrusions partly obscure it in places, but a mylonite zone marks it northern boundary. Structural geologists divide it into the undeformed sedimentary and volcanic rocks Kaniapiskau Supergroup in the Labrador Trough (including gabbro sills and plutons) in the west and high-grade anorthosite and gneiss in the east.

Virtually all of southern Labrador belongs to the major Grenville Province, which underlies much of eastern Canada and the northern US. Extensive faulting and mylonite marks its northern boundary with the other structural provinces. Archean gneisses were metamorphosed again during the Grenville orogeny and intruded by anorthosite-adamellite plutons. The Kaniapiskau Supergroup extends into the Grenville Province, marked by marble and quartzite.

During the Paleozoic around 334 million years ago, flood basalts emplaced in northern Newfoundland and southern Labrador.

Through the Mesozoic and into the Cenozoic, the landscape eroded, shedding sand into the Labrador Shelf, mainly from older metasediments and metavolcanic rocks that reached amphibolite grade on the sequence of metamorphic facies. Close to Makkovik, breccia from the Mesozoic, cut by lamprophyre-carbonatite dikes marks the opening of the Labrador Sea.

The region experienced repeat glaciations during the Pleistocene. Glaciomarine silts and mud records the melting of the glaciers on the Labrador Shelf, with significant deposition around 20,000 years ago. Analysis suggests most of these sediments originated on land in Labrador, although large amounts of limestone (which is completely absent in the Labrador) indicate a second source to the north, likely Paleozoic limestone on the Hudson Strait and Ungava Bay.

=== Natural resource geology of Labrador ===
Massive iron deposits are found in the Labrador Trough along with copper, uranium and molybdenum. Iron forms in chert from the Ungava Bay to the Grenville Front, over a span of 700 miles, while copper and nickel minerals such as pyrite, pyrrhotite, sphalerite and galena form dispersed deposits or massive bodies in Kaniapiskau Supergroup rocks. The Aillik Group hosts uranium as uraninite and pitchblende dispersed in veins in pegmatite, argillite, granulite and quartzite.

== Landforms ==
- Taylors Bay Formation
