= Prince Regent Inlet =

Body of water in Nunavut, Canada

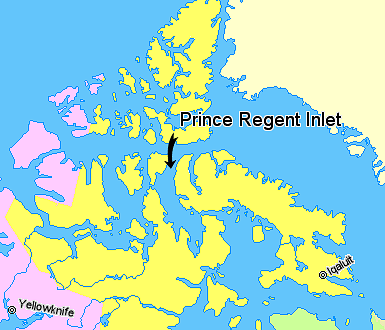
Prince Regent Inlet, Nunavut, Canada. Nunavut Northwest Territories Greenland

Prince Regent Inlet (73°00′N 090°30′W) is a body of water in Nunavut, Canada between the west end of Baffin Island (Brodeur Peninsula) and Somerset Island on the west. It opens north into Lancaster Sound and to the south merges into the Gulf of Boothia. The Arctic inlet's northern portion is approximately 40 mi (64 km) wide; the southern portion is approximately 65 mi (105 km) wide. It is deep throughout and there are no islands within the inlet.

During the quest for the Northwest Passage it was entered several times until it was realized that Prince Regent Inlet-Gulf of Boothia is a cul-de-sac for practical purposes. In 1819 William Edward Parry penetrated more than 100 miles south before turning back. In 1829 John Ross passed through it and was frozen in the Gulf of Boothia for four years before escaping. In 1852 Bellot Strait, the frozen western exit, was discovered. In 1858 Francis Leopold McClintock tried to pass this strait, gave up, and wintered near its mouth.

== See also ==
- Lancaster Aulacogen
