= Taylors Bay Formation =

- Stratigraphic range: Neoproterozoic
- Type: Formation
- Unit of: Marystown Group

Lithology
- Primary: Volcanics

Location
- Region: Newfoundland
- Country: Canada
- Occurrence of the Taylors Bay Formation in southeastern Newfoundland

The Taylors Bay Formation is a formation cropping out in Newfoundland.
