= Geology of Nunavut =

The geology of Nunavut began to form nearly three billion years ago in the Archean and the territory preserves some of the world's oldest rock units.

== Geologic history, stratigraphy and tectonics ==
=== Archean ===
Archean rocks dominate much of the territory's surface and places with overlying rock. Greenstone belts are common together with migmatite gneiss, granodiorite, and quartz monzonite, on the Melville Peninsula and northern Baffin Island, as well as the southwest mainland. Lenses and bands of amphibolite, granitoid and metasedimentary rocks are common in these areas, along with less common ultramafic rocks.

Gold and other base metals are widespread as mineralization in siliclastic, felsic, mafic and ironstone rocks of the greenstone belts. The George Lake, Boston and Ulu deposits are all hosted in the Yellowknife Supergroup of the Slave Craton in the west as well as the Lupin gold mine. In the western Churchill Province of south-central Nunavut are the Noomut, Heninga Lake and Meliadine gold deposits, and the Victory Lake and Ferguson Lake base metals deposits. Ultramafic volcanic rocks, quartzite and iron formations in the northern Churchill Province hold the Woodhurn, Prince Albert and Meadowbank gold deposits. The Churchill Province experienced widespread metamorphism 2.5 billion years ago. Baffin Island represents the eastern margin of the Canadian Shield and the long-term thermal history of southern Baffin suggests temperatures remained high (above 400C) following Trans-Hudson Orogeny peak metamorphism at c. 1.85 billion years ago, slow cooling and minor reheating ensued throughout the Proterozoic, followed by episodic sedimentary burial during the Paleozoic through Mesozoic of <3-4 km.

=== Paleozoic (539-251 million years ago) ===
Paleozoic rocks cover one-third of the territory, northwest of Fury and Hecla Strait, forming part of the Arctic Platform and continuing north to Ellesmere Island. In the southeast, they are continuation of the Hudson Platform beneath the Foxe Basin. Subsidence and craton rifting are recorded in Cambrian strata, with clastic sequences left by a marine transgression. A stable platform developed from the Cambrian through the Silurian and thick carbonates with high oil and gas potential deposited. The Caledonian orogeny brought uplift and erosion from the Silurian through the Early Devonian, generating potential red bed related copper deposits in a thick clastic wedge. The Ellesmerian orogeny produced Mississippi-valley type zinc-lead mineralization in the Polaris district of the Canadian Arctic Archipelago. Thick clastic and carbonate sediments deposited in the Sverdrup Basin in the north during the Carboniferous.

=== Proterozoic (2.5 billion-539 million years ago) ===
Hurwitz Group strata and other units from the Proterozoic cover much of the Churchill Province. Continental margin sediments deposited in central Baffin Island as the Piling Group and as the Penrhyn Group on the southern Melville Peninsula. The units include quartzite and feldspathic quartzite, overlain by dolomite, marble and gneiss, together with schist and iron formations with sulfur geochemistry. Gray, weathered psammitic rocks are common in the upper part of the basin, with high potential for base metals and gold. The former Black Angel zinc and lead mine is located within the Karrat Group carbonates on the coast of West Greenland. Ultramafic sills are found in the southern Baffin Island Lake Harbour Group.

On the Belcher Islands in Hudson Bay are clastic rocks overlain by volcanic and carbonate rocks, which record subsidence and rifting at the western edge of the Superior Craton. Thermal overprinting and deformation from the Paleoproterozoic have been found in these rocks, dating to the Trans-Hudson Orogeny 1.8 billion years ago.

The Bylot Supergroup in Baffin Island and Bylot Island is six kilometers thick with a combination of undeformed volcanic, clastic and carbonate rocks deposited during a phase of renewed rifting. The Borden Peninsula is divided into horst and graben structures by normal faults from local rifting and subsidence 1.27 billion years ago. The Nanisivik Mine extracts zinc and lead from these carbonates. The Bylot Supergroup is known as the Fury Group and Hecla Group along the Fury and Hecla Strait, where it overlies Archean and Paleoproterozoic rocks with nearly six kilometers of material, likely deposited over the span of 75 million years.

=== Mesozoic (251-66 million years ago) ===
Through the Cretaceous, sedimentation continued in the Sverdrup Basin, producing oil and gas forming conditions and Bent Horn light crude field. Rifting and alkaline volcanism in the Cretaceous began the process of siliclastic deposition in northern Baffin Island and northern Ellesmere Island.

Diamond-bearing kimberlite pipes formed on Somerset Island, exposed along the Brodeur Peninsula and northwest Baffin Island. The Jericho diamond pipes are part of a northern continuation of Lac de Gras field in the northern Slave Province. There are also kimberlite pipes on Victoria Island.

=== Cenozoic (66 million years ago-present) ===
In the far north, compression and strike-slip faulting affected the Canadian Arctic Archipelago throughout the Eureakan orogeny. The tectonic event happened in parallel with the siliclastic sedimentation and opened Baffin Bay and the Labrador Sea. The Haughton impact on Devon Island is believed to have occurred during the Rupelian age.
