= Robert McCormick (explorer) =

Royal Navy surgeon and explorer

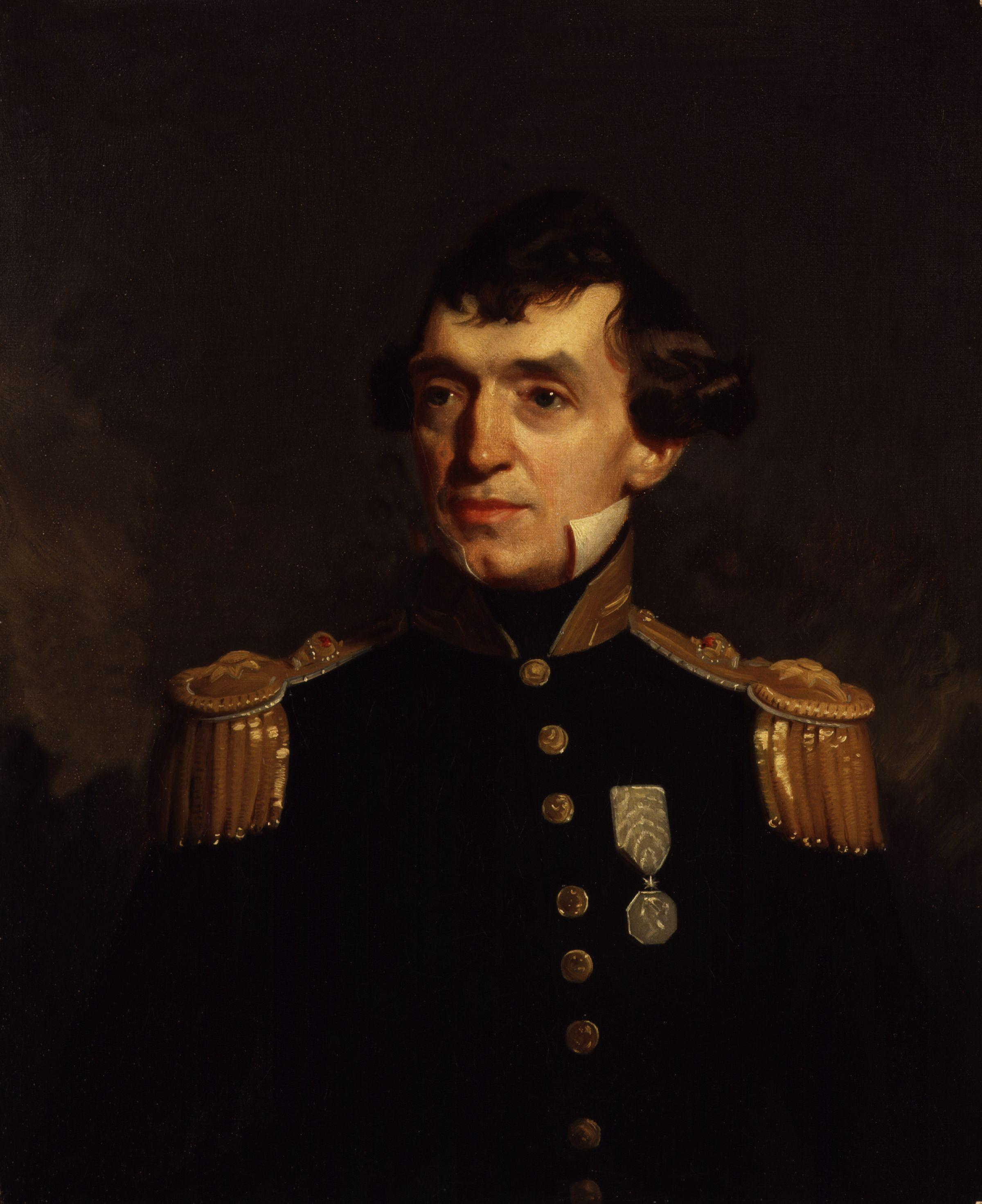
- Robert McCormick, by Stephen Pearce.
- Born: 22 July 1800; Great Yarmouth, England
- Died: 25 October 1890 (aged 90)
- Occupation: surgeon

Robert McCormick (22 July 1800 – 25 October 1890) was a British Royal Navy ship's surgeon, explorer and naturalist.

== Life ==
McCormick was born in Great Yarmouth, England. His father, also Robert McCormick, was a ship's surgeon from Ballyreagh, County Tyrone. From 1821 McCormick studied medicine in London under Sir Astley Cooper at St Thomas' Hospital and Guy's Hospital, gaining his diploma in 1822, then in 1823 he joined the Royal Navy as an assistant surgeon. He served in the West Indies for two years before being invalided home. Following a year in a North Sea cutter, he became assistant surgeon on the Hecla under William Edward Parry in 1827, joining Parry's expedition searching for the North Pole. Three commissions abroad followed, and in each case he felt unappreciated and was "invalided home", which in Naval terms implied personal dissatisfaction or disagreements.

Near the start of 1830 he took half-pay leave and attended the natural history lectures of Robert Jameson at the University of Edinburgh. This was encouraged by the Navy, McCormick felt that "only Scotchmen have any chance with the head of our department." McCormick also attended classes there in medical practice, midwifery, some botany and chemistry, and took tuition in surgery from John Lizars. By May 1831 McCormick had returned to London, where Francis Beaufort was looking for suitable personnel for a survey expedition to South America. McCormick appeared well qualified, and was recruited as ship's surgeon for the second voyage of HMS Beagle under Captain Robert FitzRoy. McCormick expected this position meant the usual duties as a naturalist, as did Jameson who wrote to him in November giving detailed advice on how to make the most of the "numberless opportunities" this "exploratory expedition" would provide "for the advancement of natural history". McCormick fully expected to put together a sizeable natural history collection with significant social value, gaining him fame as an exploring naturalist.

While the preparations of the Beagle progressed in late October, McCormick met Charles Darwin who had been given an unofficial place on board as a self-funded gentleman naturalist who would be a companion to Captain FitzRoy. Darwin wrote telling his university tutor John Stevens Henslow about McCormick: "My friend the Doctor is an ass, but we jog on very amicably: at present he is in great tribulation, whether his cabin shall be painted French Grey or a dead white— I hear little excepting this subject from him". When the voyage got under way, their first landfall was at St. Jago in the Cape Verde Islands in January 1832. McCormick and Darwin walked into the countryside together, and Darwin, influenced by Charles Lyell's ideas on geology, found the surgeon's approach old-fashioned: "He was a philosopher of rather an antient date; at St Jago by his own account he made general remarks during the first fortnight & collected particular facts during the last." McCormick became increasingly frustrated as FitzRoy took Darwin onshore, leaving McCormick behind without opportunities for collecting. The last straw came at Rio de Janeiro in April 1832, when FitzRoy arranged for Darwin's collection to be packaged and sent back to England. McCormick was invalided home, and as he recalled in his memoirs of 1884, "Having found myself in a false position on board a small and very uncomfortable vessel, and very much disappointed in my expectations of carrying out my natural history pursuits, every obstacle having been placed in the way of my getting on shore and making collections, I got permission from the admiral in command of the station here to be superseded and allowed a passage home in H.M.S. Tyne.")

McCormick subsequently became surgeon on the James Clark Ross's Antarctic expedition between 1839 and 1842. On the latter voyage most of the naturalist's duties were performed by Joseph Dalton Hooker, with McCormick concentrating on geology and bird collecting, assisted by Thomas Abernethy.

On 26 August 1844 McCormick was elected a Fellow of the Royal College of Surgeons.

McCormick also led an unsuccessful search party in search of John Franklin in the Forlorn Hope. His autobiography was entitled Voyages of Discovery in the Arctic and Antarctic Seas and around the World (1884).

== Legacy ==
The south polar skua (Stercorarius maccormicki) was named for him by Howard Saunders. McCormick shot the type specimen on 12 January 1841, on Possession Island, Victoria Land, Antarctica.

Devon Island's Macormick Bay, near the area he explored in search of Franklin's lost expedition, is named in McCormick's honor. MacCormick Fjord in NW Greenland was named after him by Robert Peary.

== See also ==
- European and American voyages of scientific exploration
