= Geology of Quebec =

The geology of Quebec involves several different geologic provinces, made up of ancient Precambrian crystalline igneous and metamorphic rock, overlain by younger sedimentary rocks and soils. Most of southern Quebec is dominated by the Grenville Province, while the vast north is divided between the large Superior Province and the Churchill Province to the east, near Labrador.

== Geologic history, stratigraphy & tectonics ==
The Grenville Province, which dominates southern Quebec, particularly the northern shore of the St. Lawrence formed beginning in the Archean, more than 2.5 billion years ago. Geologists subdivide the Grenville Province into the allochthonous belt along the river itself and a more northern parautochthonous belt.

The parautochthon is a band running parallel to the Grenville Front, which varies in width from Labrador to northeastern Georgian Bay on Lake Huron. The parautochthonous rocks are made up composed of ancient Archean and Proterozoic rocks that are highly deformed plutonic and metamorphosed supracrustal (metasedimentary and metavolcanic) rocks that reached greenschist to granulite facies on the sequence of metamorphic facies during the Grenville orogeny. These rocks correlate with the least deformed rocks north of the Grenville Front in the Superior Province and show signs of east-west lateral extension.

The allochthon includes all the lands of the Grenville Province south of the parautochthon. The allochthon juxtaposed on the parautochthon during the Grenville orogenic cycle from 1.09 billion to 985 million years ago. The allochthon is composed of Paleoproterozoic to Mesoproterozoic rocks. In the western part, it is mainly marble, quartzite, and pelite platform levels and Mesoproterozoic amphibolite-grade rocks. There are also charnockite and anorthosite intrusions that intersect metasediments and orthogneiss. In the center, migmatite, quartzo-feldspathic orthogneisses and mangerites predominate. In its eastern part, it consists mainly of gneissic rocks of varied composition and origin, metasedimentary rocks, granitoid intrusions, gabbro, gabbronorite and anorthosite. There are also several anorthositic intrusions scattered throughout the allochthonous belt.

The Canadian Shield spans much of northern Quebec, which is primarily underlain by the Superior Craton, a 160-mile thick section of stable continental crust formed beginning 4.03 billion years ago. In the northwest and at the northern tip of the Ungava Peninsula is the large Churchill Craton, which extends into Labrador and Nunavut as the eastern extent of the Canadian Shield. Quebec's northern bedrock is also composed of the Hudson Platform along the shore of James Bay and a small section of the Nain Province, near the northern tip of Labrador.

The St. Lawrence Platform occupies the lowlands where much of Quebec's urban population lives, while the Gaspé Peninsula, Anticosti Island and the Magdalene Islands are part of the Appalachian Province.

=== Paleozoic (539–251 million years ago) ===
During the Taconic orogeny that began the formation of the Appalachian Mountains, amphibolite, mica schist and other metamorphic rocks formed a belt running down the Gaspe Peninsula to Sherbrooke. Muscovite-bearing granites and metamorphic rocks around Val-des-Sources formed over a broad span from 468 to 379 million years ago. While slate and plutonic tonalite formed in the vicinity of Becancour and Quebec City respectively.

Around 292 million years ago, volcanism deposited tuff in the Magdalene Islands.

=== Mesozoic (251–66 million years ago) ===
Sedimentary deposition and some volcanic activity took place during the Mesozoic, particularly in the lowlands of the St. Lawrence Platform. Central Montreal is underlain by 119 to 117 million year old plutonic basanite, lamprophyre and camptonite while to the immediate southeast amphibole gabbro and peralkaline rocks formed from 141 to 123 million years ago.

Cretaceous intrusive rocks formed hills housed in the sedimentary rocks of the St. Lawrence Lowlands Platform, notably Mount St. Bruno.

=== Cenozoic (66 million years ago–present) ===
Quebec experienced intense erosion during the past 2.5 million years of the Quaternary, which often mobilized older rocks, such as Proterozoic granite boulders found offshore in the moraines which formed parts of the Magdalene Islands.
