= Ungava Fault Zone =

The Ungava Fault Zone, also called the Ungava Transform Fault Zone and the Ungava Fault Complex, is a major strike-slip fault system in Davis Strait between Baffin Island and Greenland. Its faults are oriented northeast–southwest and were tectonically active in the Paleogene, during which the fault zone formed a boundary between the Greenland and North American plates. The Ungava Fault Zone connects the Baffin Basin in the north with the Labrador Basin in the south.
