= Shore lead =

Waterway opening between pack ice and shore

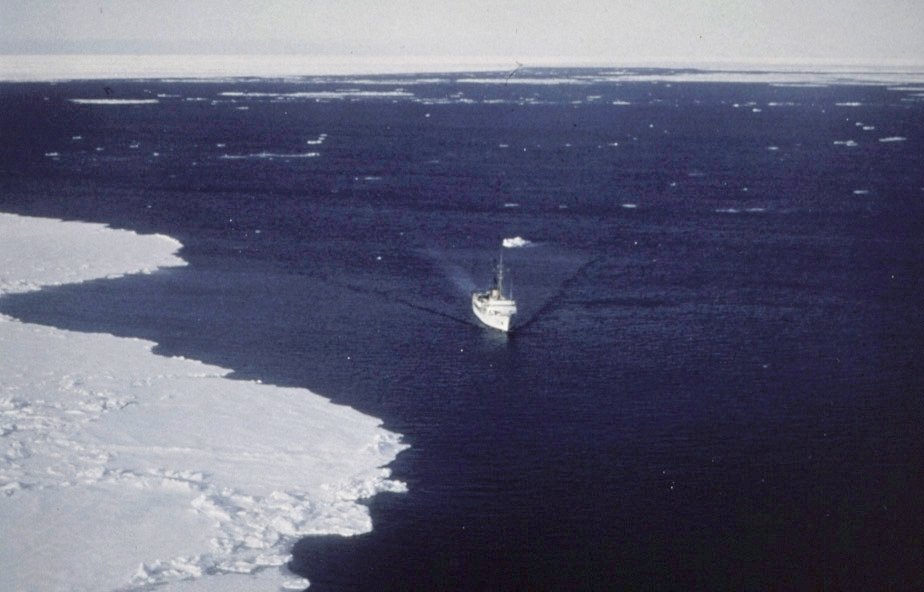
NOAA Ship Surveyor in 1977.

A shore lead (or coastal lead) is an oceanographic term for a waterway opening between pack ice and shore. While the gap of water may be as narrow as a tide crack if closed by wind or currents, it can be as wide as 1,000 feet (300 m). Its formation can be influenced by tidal action, or subsurface conditions, such as current and ocean floor. Commonly, a shore lead is navigable by surface vessels.

An opening ("lead") between pack ice and fast ice is referred to as a flaw lead.
