= Greenland plate =

Supposed tectonic microplate containing the Greenland craton

The Greenland plate is a tectonic microplate bounded to the west by Nares Strait, a probable transform fault; on the southwest by the Ungava transform underlying Davis Strait; on the southeast by the Mid-Atlantic Ridge; and the northeast by the Gakkel Ridge, with its northwest border still being explored. The Greenland craton is made up of some of the oldest rocks on Earth. The Isua greenstone belt in southwestern Greenland contains the oldest known rocks on Earth dated at 3.7–3.8 billion years old.

The Precambrian basement of Greenland formed an integral part of the Laurentian Shield that is at the core of the North American continent. Greenland was formed in two rifting stages from the main body of North America. The first, during the Cretaceous period, formed Baffin Bay. Baffin Bay is the northwestern extension and terminus of the North Atlantic-Labrador Sea rift system that started forming 140 million years ago in the Early Cretaceous epoch. The Labrador Sea started opening 69 million years ago during the Maastrichtian age but seafloor spreading appears to have ceased by the Oligocene epoch, 30–35 million years ago. Correlations between tectonic units in Canada and Greenland have been proposed; however, the pre-spreading fit of Greenland to Canada is still not accurately known. A sinistral transtensive rifting which was proposed with NNE-SSW trending mobile transfer zones fits Greenland to Canada directly in a southward direction.

Since the closure of the North Atlantic–Labrador Sea rift, Greenland has moved roughly in conjunction with North America; thus, there are questions as to whether the Greenland plate should still be considered a separate plate at all. The area between Greenland and Baffin Island is, however, seismically very active, being the location of the epicenter of many earthquakes including a 7.3-magnitude earthquake in 1933. As of 2009, scientists have been unable to correlate the seismicity with particular geological structures or geophysical anomalies. It has been suggested that seismicity in the region is related to the stresses associated with post-glacial rebound.

== See also ==
- List of tectonic plates
- Geography of Greenland
