= Lancaster Sound =

Body of water in the Qikiqtaaluk Region, Nunavut, Canada

- Tallurutiup Imanga
- ᑕᓪᓗᕈᑎᐅᑉ ᐃᒪᖓ (Inuktitut)
- Location in Nunavut
- Location: Qikiqtaaluk Region, Nunavut
- Coordinates: 74°13′00″N 84°00′00″W
- Type: Strait
- Etymology: Named for James Lancaster
- Part of: Parry Channel
- Basin countries: Canada

Lancaster Sound (Inuktitut: ᑕᓪᓗᕈᑎᐅᑉ ᐃᒪᖓ, romanized: Tallurutiup Imanga) is a body of water in the Qikiqtaaluk Region, Nunavut, Canada. It is located between Devon Island and Baffin Island, forming the eastern entrance to the Parry Channel and the Northwest Passage. East of the sound lies Baffin Bay; to the west lies Viscount Melville Sound. Further west, a traveller would enter the M'Clure Strait before heading into the Arctic Ocean.

The Inuit and their predecessors in the region, the Paleo-Eskimos, have relied for hundreds, perhaps thousands of years, on the sound's abundant natural wealth for food, clothing and shelter. Today, residents of the three Nunavut communities of Pond Inlet, Arctic Bay, and Resolute continue this tradition, depending on their waters for their economic and cultural well-being.

== History ==
Lancaster Sound was named in 1616 by explorer William Baffin for Sir James Lancaster, one of the three main financial supporters of his exploratory expeditions. The abortive expedition by the British explorer John Ross in 1818 ended when he saw what he believed were mountains blocking the end of Lancaster Sound. In 1819, William Edward Parry navigated through it and went as far west as Melville Island. The sound was thoroughly explored during an extensive aerial mapping program of Northern Canada by the Canadian Government, which took place from the 1930s until the late 1950s to complete. Coincidentally, the type of aircraft used to complete the mapping program was the Avro Lancaster, a World War II heavy bomber which had been converted for mapping.

== Geography ==
Ice cover, including both land-fast ice and pack ice, is common for nine months of the year. A shore lead system ensures the presence of ice-free water areas.

== Ecology ==
Wildlife is rich and varied, with an immense amount of Arctic cod (30,000 tons worth) known to exist there. The Arctic cod is also part of the diet for many of the birds in Lancaster Sound and marine mammals. Many narwhal, beluga, bowhead whales, ringed, bearded and harp seals, walruses, polar bears, thick-billed murres, black-legged kittiwakes, northern fulmars, black guillemots, Arctic terns, ivory gulls, and snow geese all occupy the area.

== Conservation ==
=== Early conservation efforts ===
In 1968, exploratory permits were granted for 14 million acres of Canada's Arctic waters, including Lancaster Sound. In 1974, Norlands Petroleum Ltd was given approval-in-principle to drill an exploratory well in the middle of Lancaster Sound. Community opposition led to the creation of an Environmental Assessment Review Panel that recommended in 1978 that Norlands' proposal not be allowed until the company could explain how exploratory drilling was compatible with current and future uses in Lancaster Sound.

This area was not yet represented in the Canadian National Marine Conservation Areas system, despite an attempt to do so at the request of local Inuit in 1987. A preliminary Minerals and Energy Resource Assessment to create a National Marine Park was completed in 1989, but nothing came of this.

=== Tallurutiup Imanga National Marine Conservation Area ===
On December 8, 2009, Canadian Environment Minister Jim Prentice announced a $5 million feasibility study for a new National Marine Conservation Area (NMCA) in Lancaster Sound.

A National Marine Conservation Area designation precluded oil and gas development, and questions arose when the Nunavut Impact Review Board approved a proposal from Natural Resources Canada (NRCAN) and the Geological Survey of Canada to conduct seismic testing for oil within Lancaster and Jones Sound in August and September 2010. The new seismic tests were not part of the Mineral and Energy Resource Assessment (MERA) process, which is necessary for establishing new parks. In June 2010, communities and groups came out against seismic testing in Lancaster and Jones Sound.

In late June, planned seismic tests were apparently scaled back. However, in late July NRCAN announced that plans for seismic testing were proceeding despite the unanimous opposition of Inuit communities and supporting organizations.

In a major ruling on August 8, 2010, a Nunavut court sided with the Inuit and stopped the planned seismic testing, citing the risks to marine animals and cultural heritage. The federal Conservative government announced on December 6, 2010, that it would establish the boundaries of a new marine park in Lancaster Sound.

In 2012, the Qikiqtani Inuit Association (QIA) issued a report on Lancaster Sound for North Baffin communities entitled: "Tallurutiup Tariunga Inulik: Inuit Participation in Determining the Future of Lancaster Sound". The report has two stated purposes; to provide Nunavut Land Claims Beneficiaries with an introduction to the proposed Lancaster Sound National Marine Conservation Area (NMCA), and to inform Parks Canada, the Government of Nunavut and those interested of Inuit perspectives on marine conservation. This report explains what an NMCA is, the history surrounding interests in Lancaster Sound, the importance of where boundaries are suggested, and a discussion on the realities of Inuit cooperative management in Nunavut. "This report has been titled, Tallurutiup Tariunga Inulik, which means 'Lancaster Sound has people' and also 'Lancaster Sound has Inuit.' It is from the perspective of a homeland that QIA approaches discussions related to this great region."

In June 2016, the park gained the potential to expand into an area recommended by QIA when Shell relinquished adjacent oil leases after a coalition of environmental groups argued that the leases had expired.

In August 2017, the federal government, the Territory of Nunavut and the Qikiqtani Inuit Association announced an agreement on the final boundary protecting a 109,000 km^{2} (42,000 sq mi) area, making it the largest marine conservation area in Canada. The final negotiation of an Inuit Impact Benefit Agreement is expected to be completed by the spring of 2019. The Tallurutiup Imanga—with its diversity of seabirds and marine and land mammals that have sustained the Inuit of the region for millennia, was mentioned in the United Nations' Convention on Biological Diversity (CBD) 5th Global Biodiversity Outlook 2020 report in its section on Canada. Canada had established marine protected areas and undertook other "effective area-based conservation measures" that collectively covered over 130,000 km^{2} (50,000 sq mi). This included the interim protection announced in 2017 for the Tallurutiup Imanga National Marine Conservation Area, Nunavut, in cooperation with the Qikiqtani Inuit Association.

== See also ==
- Lancaster Aulacogen
- North Water Polynya
