= Brodeur Peninsula =

Headland on Baffin Island, Canada

Coordinates: 72°N 088°W

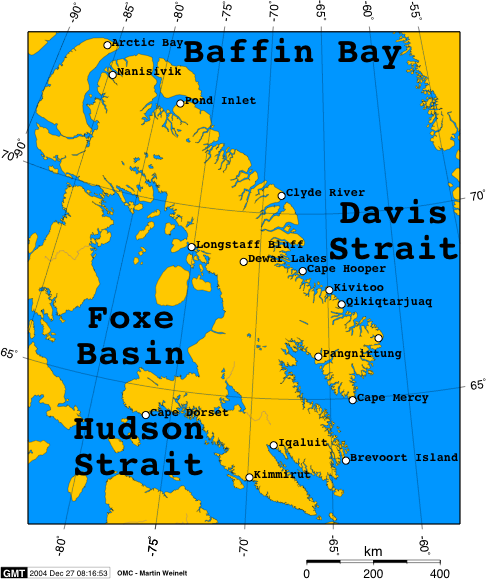
The horn-like Brodeur Peninsula is in the top left as the northwestern part of Baffin Island

The Brodeur Peninsula is an uninhabited headland on Baffin Island in the Qikiqtaaluk Region of Nunavut, Canada. It is located in the northwestern part of the island and is bounded by Prince Regent Inlet to the west, Lancaster Sound to the north, and Admiralty Inlet to the east. The peninsula is connected to the rest of Baffin Island by a narrow isthmus to the south.

It was named by after Louis-Philippe Brodeur by Joseph-Elzéar Bernier.

== Geography ==
The habitat is characterized by rocky shores and coastal cliffs, as well as barrens and rocky flats.

== Fauna ==
Northwestern Brodeur Peninsula, 475 km^{2} (183 sq mi) in size, is a Canadian Important Bird Area (#NU065). It is home to the ivory gull, but researchers have been witnessing a dramatic decrease in breeding populations in the region in recent times.

The western side of the Brodeur Peninsula is known as a polar bear mating ground.

== Land use ==
Serious efforts are underway to find minerals in the area. Twin Mining owns a 1,300,000 acres (5,300 km^{2}; 2,000 sq mi), diamond property on the peninsula.
