= Bellot Strait =

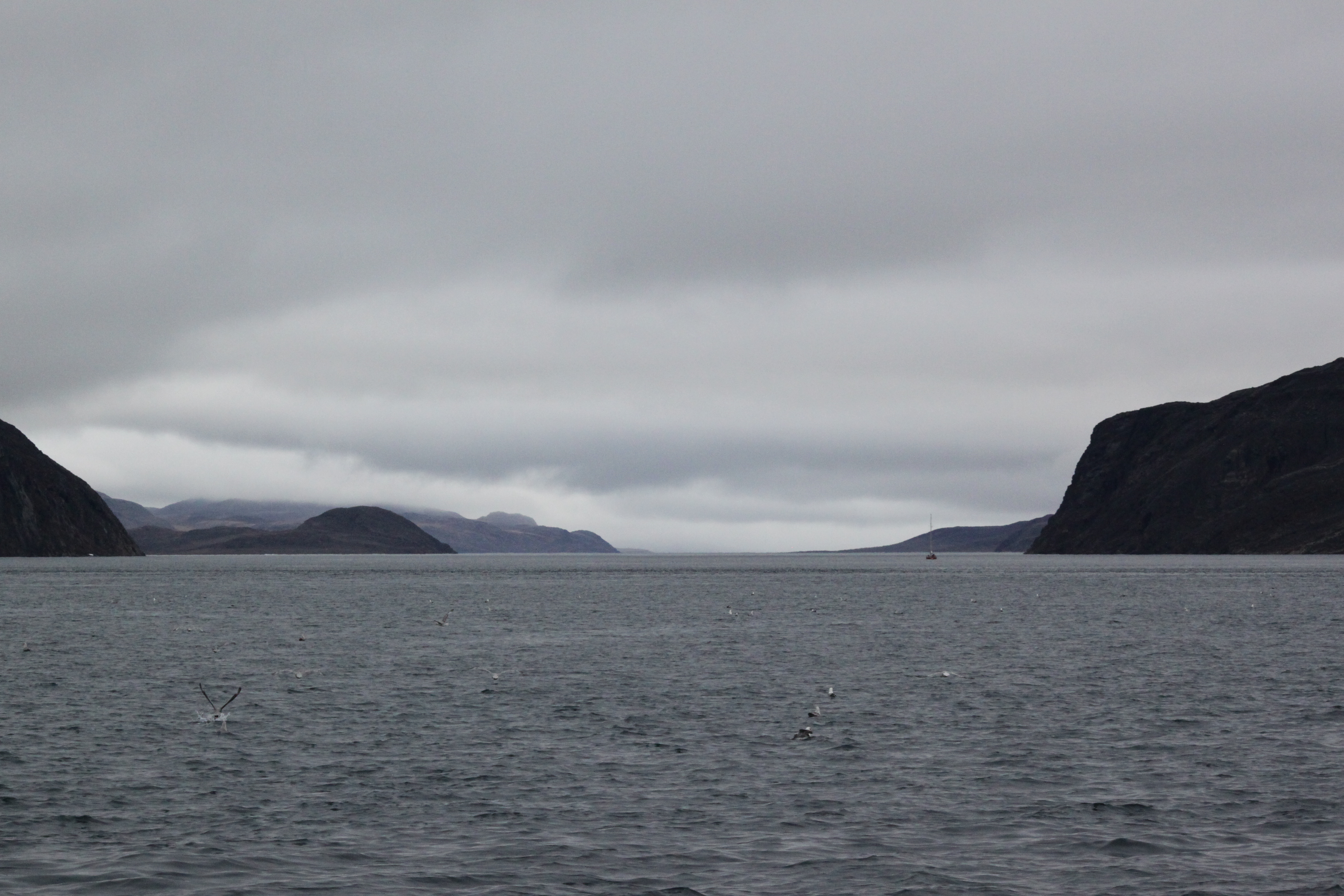
- Bellot Strait viewed from its western end

- Location of the strait in Nunavut Bellot Strait (Canada)
- Coordinates: 72°00′N 94°45′W
- Type: Strait
- Etymology: Named after Joseph René Bellot
- Max. length: 25 km (16 mi)
- Max. width: 2 km (1.2 mi)

Bellot Strait is a strait in Nunavut that separates Somerset Island to its north from the Murchison Promontory of Boothia Peninsula to its south, which is the northernmost part of the mainland of the Americas. The two-kilometre-wide (1.2 mi) and 25-kilometre-long (16 mi) strait connects the Gulf of Boothia, Prince Regent Inlet, and Brentford Bay to its east with Peel Sound and Franklin Strait to its west.

== Geography ==
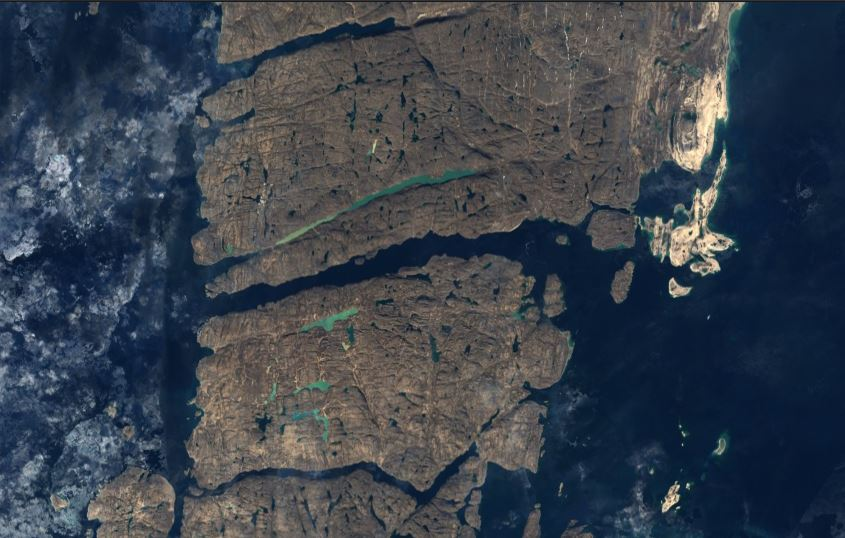
Satellite image of Bellot Strait

The north side of the strait rises steeply to approximately 450 metres (1,480 ft), and the south shore to approximately 750 metres (2,460 ft). The current in the strait can run at up to 8 knots (15 km/h; 9.2 mph) and often changes its direction. It is also often filled with small icebergs which pose a danger to ships in the strait.

== History ==
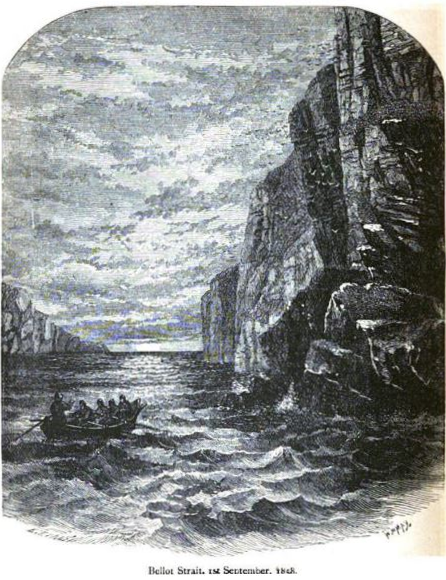
One of the earliest depictions of the strait, showing one attempt by the McClintock expedition to pass through

The first Europeans to see the strait were the Canadian explorer William Kennedy and the French naval officer Joseph René Bellot, who reached it by dogsled from Batty Bay in 1852. This proved that Somerset was an island and that Prince Regent Inlet had a difficult westward exit.

In 1858, Francis Leopold McClintock tried to pass the strait but had to abandon the attempt. The strait was first crossed from west to east by the Hudson's Bay Company ship Aklavik in 1937, piloted by Scotty Gall. Henry Larsen crossed it in 1942 on the first west-east transit of the Northwest Passage.

The Fort Ross trading post on the northern shore was established in 1937, and lasted for 11 years. However, the building has been refurbished and strengthened, and acts as a refuge for researchers and crews of small boats passing through.

== Sources ==
- Gordon, Stanley (31 January 2014). "Bellot Strait". The Canadian Encyclopedia. Historica Canada. Archived from the original on 30 September 2007.
- The Columbia Gazetteer of North America
- Bellot Strait conditions – Ross Weld

== Bibliography ==
- Finley, K. J.; Johnston, W. G. (1977). An investigation of the distribution of marine mammals in the vicinity of Somerset Island. Toronto: LGL Limited. OCLC 41817456.
