= Joseph René Bellot =

French polar explorer (1826–1853)

Joseph-René Bellot
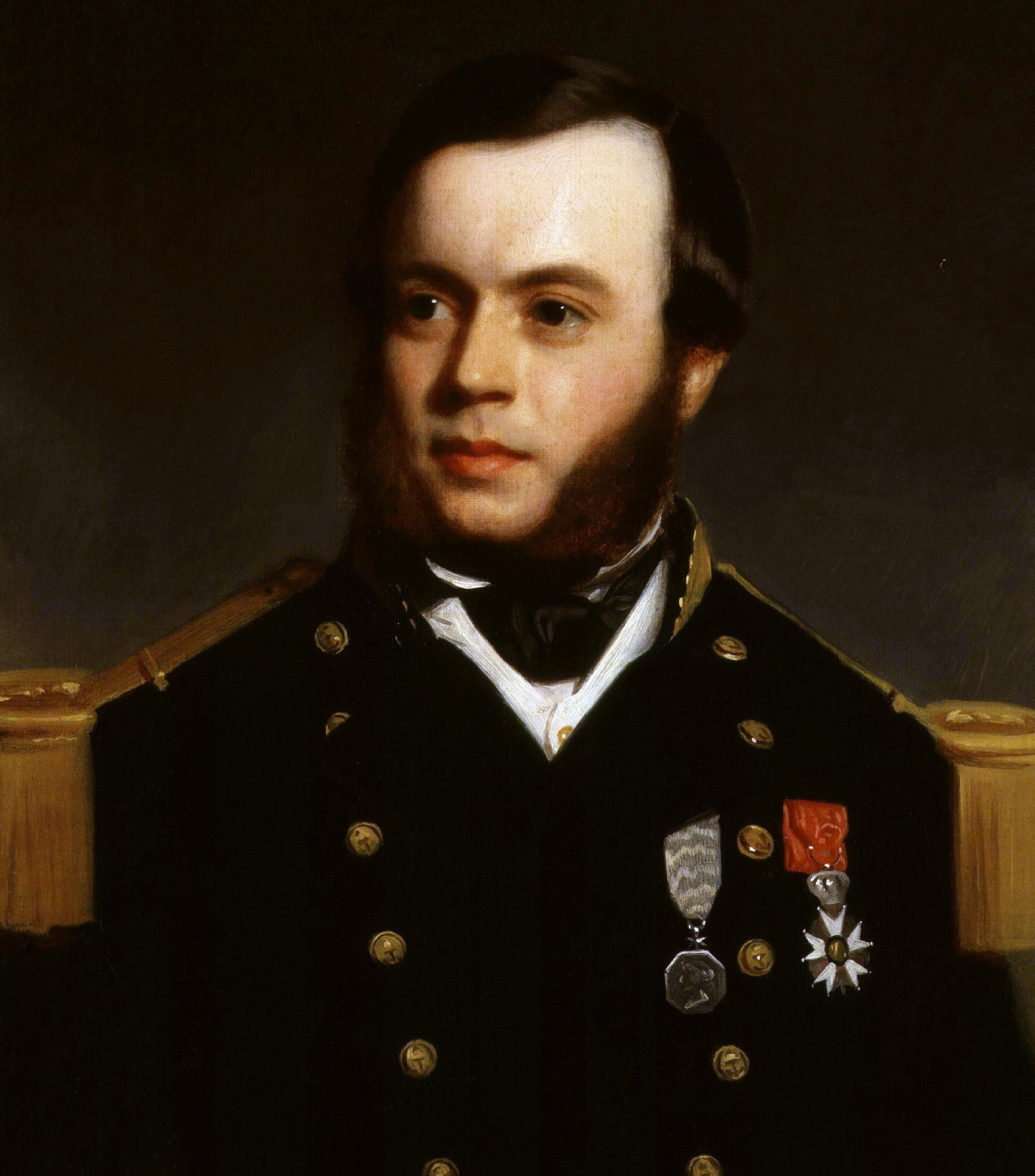
- Portrait by Stephen Pearce
- Born: 18 March 1826; Paris, France
- Died: 18 August 1853 (aged 27); Wellington Channel
- Military career
- Branch: French Navy
- Service years: 1841–1853
- Rank: Lieutenant
- Conflicts: Battle of Tamatave; Uruguayan Civil War
- Awards: Legion of Honour

Joseph-René Bellot (English: /bɛˈloʊ/ bel-LOH, French: [ʒozɛf ʁəne bɛlo]; 18 March 1826 – 18 August 1853) was a French naval officer and Arctic explorer.

== Biography ==
Bellot was born in Paris, the son of a farrier, but moved to Rochefort with his family in 1831. With the aid of the authorities of Rochefort he was enabled at the age of 15 to enter the Ecole Navale at Brest, in which he studied two years and earned a high reputation. He then took part in the Anglo-French expedition of 1845 to Madagascar, and received the cross of the Legion of Honour for distinguished conduct. He afterwards took part in Anglo-French blockade of the Río de la Plata, that of Parana to South America, which opened the Río de la Plata to commerce.

In 1851, he joined the Arctic expedition under the command of Captain William Kennedy in search of Sir John Franklin. To harden himself for the Arctic winters, Bellot is said to have allowed himself only a thin mattress and one blanket on bare boards. When he met his first Inuit he endeared himself to them by constructing an artificial leg for a man who was disabled.

In February 1852, Kennedy and Bellot set out from their winter quarters in Batty Bay on a dog sledging journey, travelling south to Brentford Bay, where they discovered Bellot Strait, a strait between Boothia Felix and Somerset Island. They then continued west to cross Prince of Wales Island to Ommanney Bay, returning to Batty Bay via Peel Sound and Cape Walker – a total trek of 1,800 kilometres (1,100 mi). Bellot's narrative of the expedition was published posthumously in 1854.

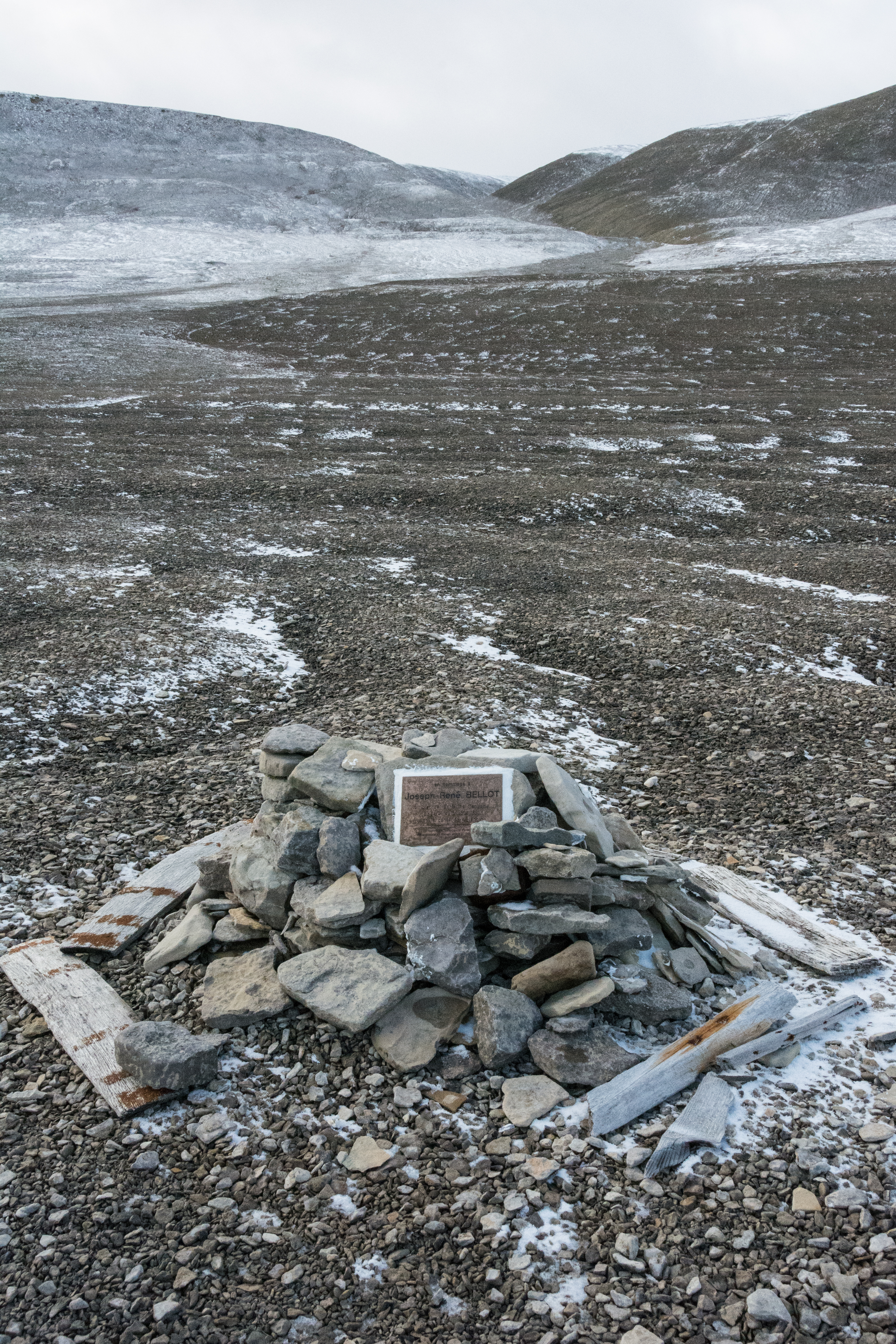
Memorial cairn for Joseph-René Bellot on Beechey Island, in the Canadian High Arctic, September 2015

Early in 1852, he was promoted to the rank of lieutenant, and in the same year accompanied the Franklin search expedition under Captain Edward Augustus Inglefield. As on the previous occasion, his intelligence, devotion to duty and courage won him wide admiration. While making a perilous journey with two comrades for the purpose of communicating with Sir Edward Belcher, he suddenly disappeared in an opening between the broken masses of ice in the Wellington Channel. A memorial grave was built on nearby Beechey Island. A pension was granted to his family by the emperor Napoleon III.

== Legacy ==
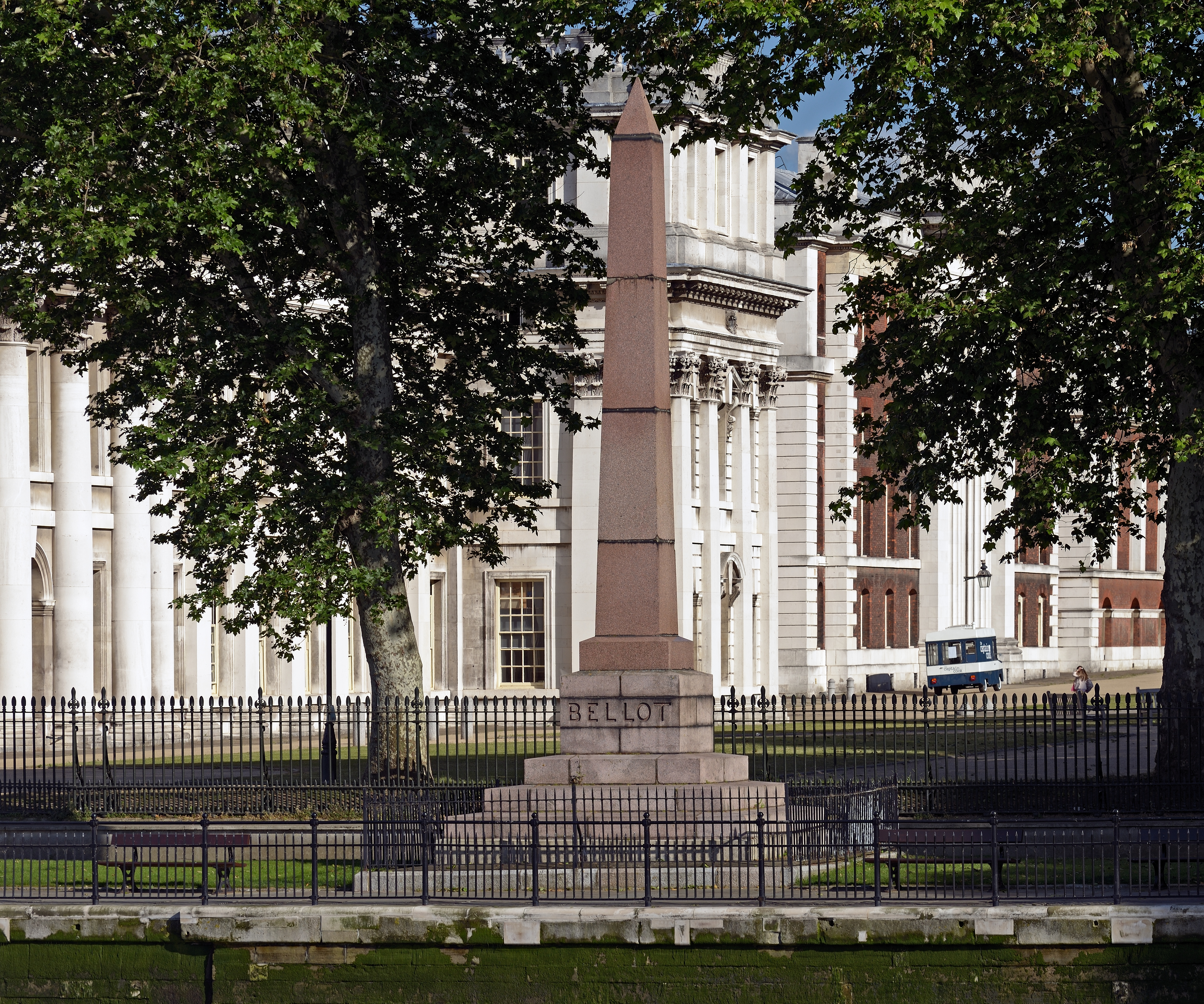
Bellot Memorial, Greenwich, South East London

The young explorer was mourned widely, and £2,000 was raised by a Royal Geographical Society committee – chaired by Sir Roderick Murchison – after his death, of which £500 went towards a granite memorial obelisk, designed by Philip Hardwick and unveiled in 1855, in his memory on the Thames riverside, in front of Greenwich Hospital. The remainder of the money went towards supporting his five sisters. A nearby Greenwich street, Bellot Street SE10, also carries his name. In 1935, an impact crater on the Moon, on the edge of the Sea of Fecundity, was named Bellot in his honour.
