= Murchison Promontory =

Northernmost point of mainland North America

Location in Nunavut, Canada

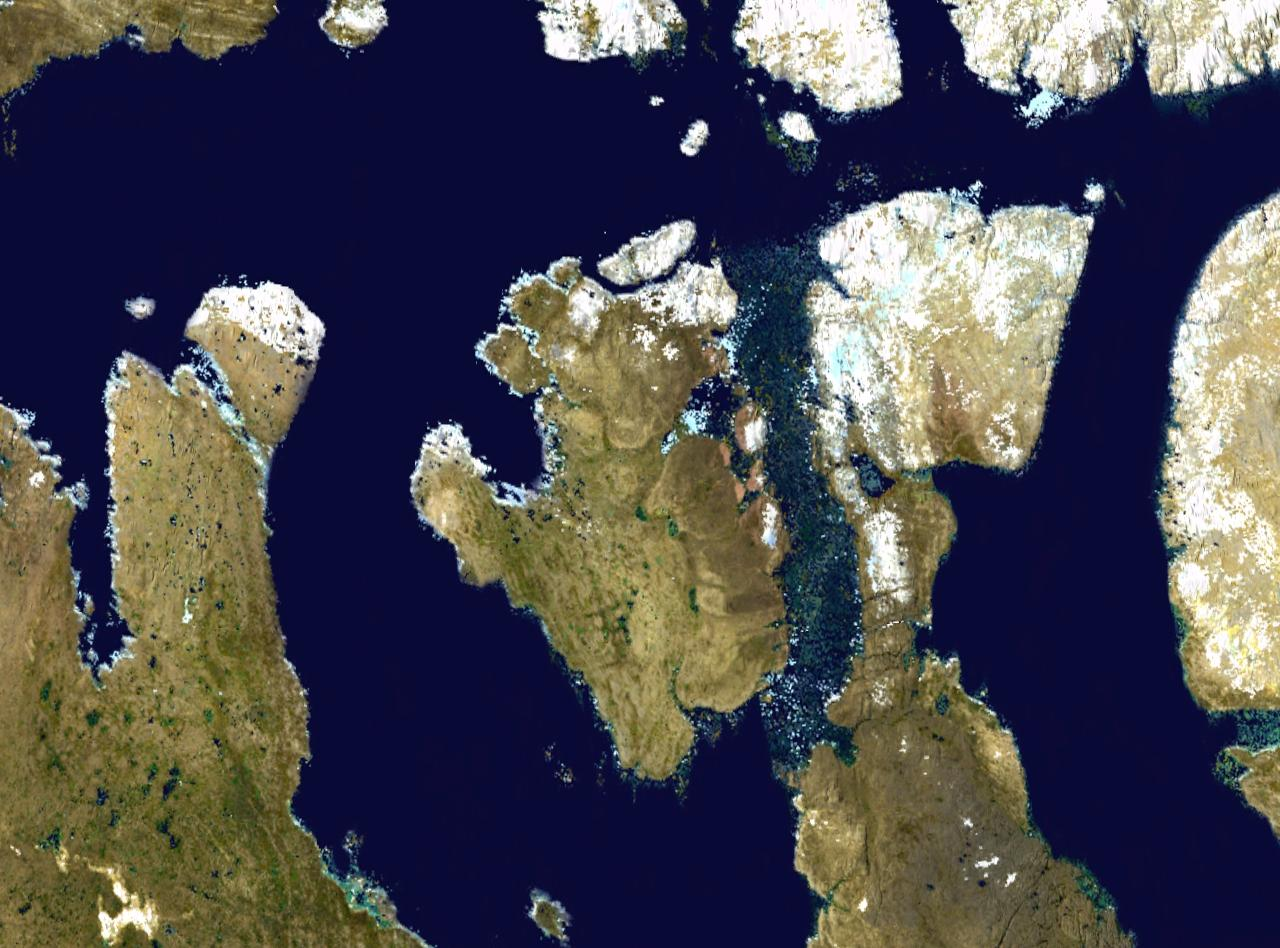
Satellite image with Prince of Wales Island at centre. Near top right is the square-shaped Somerset Island, below which is the Murchison Promontory at the north end of the Boothia Peninsula, part of the continental mainland.

Murchison Promontory (71°58′N 94°57′W), a cape (promontory) in the northern Canadian Arctic, is the northernmost mainland point of the Americas and of Canada. Located 1,087 nautical miles (1,251 mi; 2,013 km) from the North Pole, it is 64 km (40 mi) farther north than Point Barrow, Alaska, the northernmost point of all U.S. territory.

== Geography ==
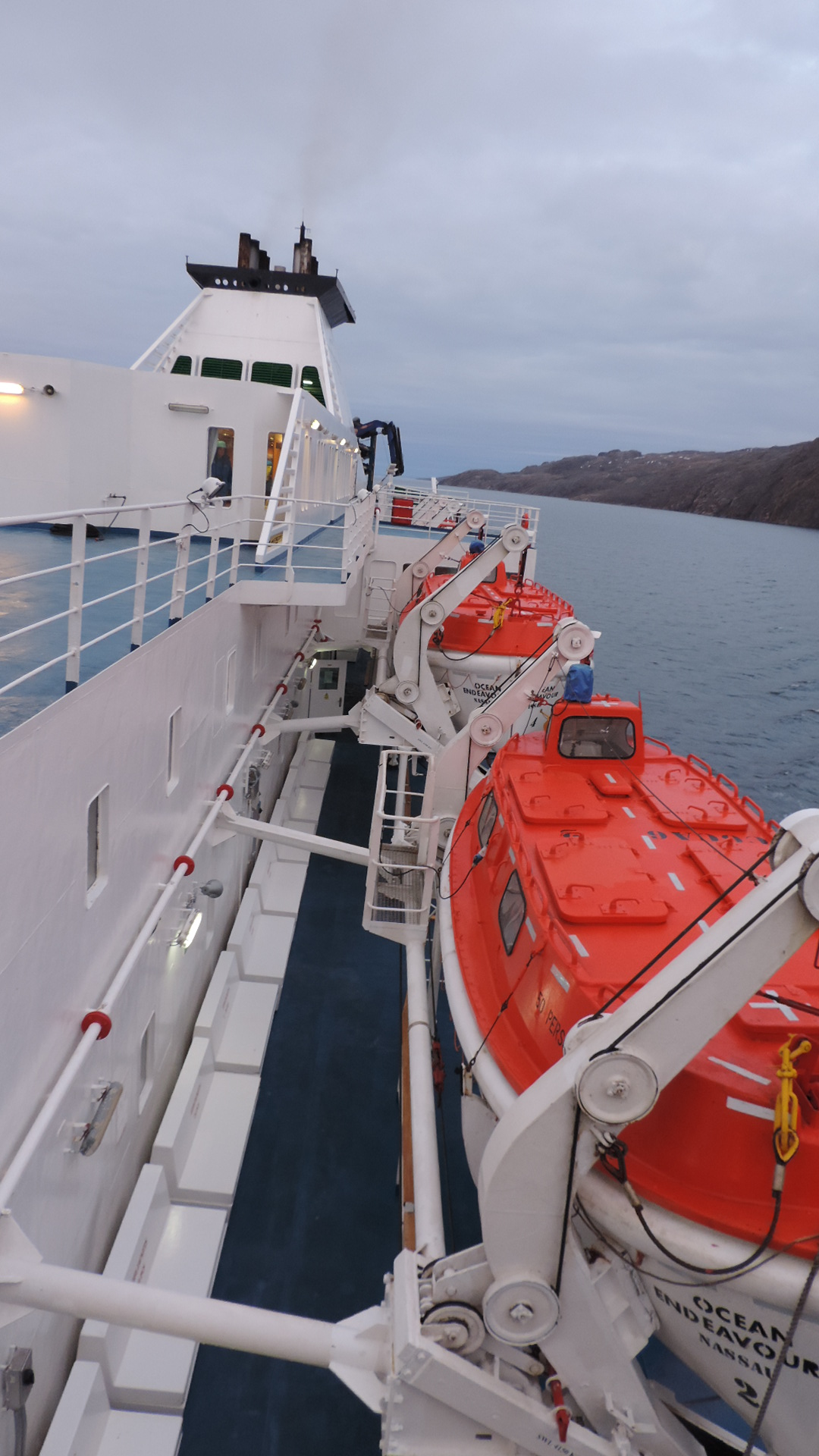
MS Ocean Endeavour in September 2019 proceeding west to east along the Bellot Strait; ahead is Zenith Point, the northernmost point of continental North America.

Murchison Promontory extends along the northern edge of the Boothia Peninsula, at right angles to the Bellot Strait, which separates it from Somerset Island. Situated in the Kitikmeot Region (Inuktitut: Qitirmiut) of Nunavut, its northernmost point, Zenith Point, is located at 72°00′N 94°39′W. The nearest community is Taloyoak, approximately 250 km (160 mi) to the south.

== History ==
The area was first explored in April 1852 by the Canadian Captain William Kennedy and the French explorer Joseph René Bellot while searching for traces of John Franklin's lost Arctic expedition. The strait was then named after Bellot, who drowned the following year when he fell through the ice in the Wellington Channel.

Irish-born Francis Leopold McClintock also wintered in the area with his ship Fox in the winter of 1858–1859 in his search for the Franklin expedition. In July 1859, McClintock named the promontory, which his expedition determined to be the northernmost point of the mainland, after Royal Geographical Society president Roderick Murchison. Murchison was a prominent supporter of Jane Franklin in her efforts towards a continued search for her husband, which included the sponsorship of McClintock's expedition.

In 1937, Scot E. J. "Scotty" Gall passed the promontory on his ship Aklavik on the first crossing of the Bellot Strait, travelling from the western shore to the eastern for the Hudson's Bay Company.
