= Winston David Ward =

English-Canadian artist and writer

- Born: July 20, 1964 (age 61)
- Known for: Painter, printmaker, writer

Winston David Ward (born 20 July 1964), also known as W. David Ward, is an English-Canadian artist and writer.

== Career ==
He began his career in the arts in 1988, as a realist painter. Over the past twenty-five year, his work has evolved to include print making and writing. In 1992, Ward exhibited at the Lotte Gallery in Seoul, South Korea, along with two other Canadian painters: Bruce Bezaire and Mark Fletcher. This was the first showing of contemporary Canadian art in South Korea.

In July 2006 the artist participated in the Arctic Quest Expedition, along with 24 other Canadian painters and two writers from the Toronto Star. The project was to commemorate the centenary of Roald Amundsen's 1906 transit of the Northwest Passage and celebrate Canada's long-standing tradition of art inspired by the northern landscape.

Ward's current work focuses primarily on wilderness landscapes, mythology and architecture. He exhibited actively in Canada and the United States until 2009. Since this time he, has focused on special projects and private commission work. He is a member of the Arts and Letters Club of Toronto, and is represented by Loch Gallery, in Toronto, Winnipeg and Calgary.

In January 2013, the Royal Canadian Mint produced two 1 Kilogram investment coins (Gold and Silver) celebrating the Canadian Arctic landscape, and selected one of Ward's designs for this project.

The Artist's paintings can be found in numerous private, corporate and public collections, including: The Gail Art Museum, Seoul, South Korea; The Vancouver Maritime Museum; 'The Rooms', the Provincial Art Gallery in St.John, Newfoundland and in the Manx National Heritage collection (The National Gallery), Douglas, Isle of Man.
