= Henry Larsen (explorer) =

20th-century Canadian Arctic explorer

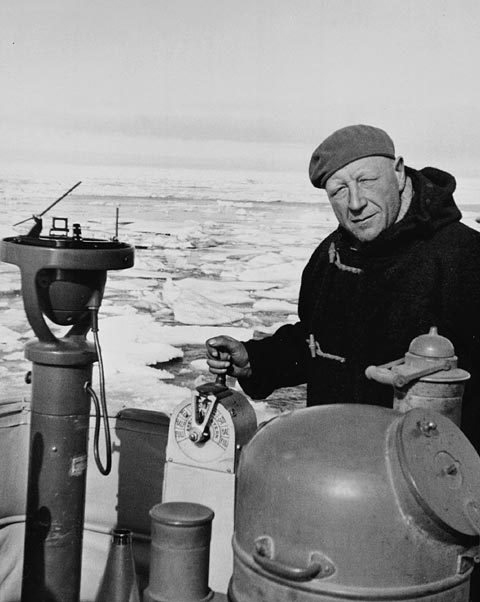
Henry Larsen on the RCMPV St. Roch

Henry Asbjørn Larsen (September 30, 1899 – October 29, 1964) was a Norwegian-Canadian Arctic explorer. Larsen was born on a small island, Herføl, south of Fredrikstad in Norway. Like his hero, Roald Amundsen, he became a seaman. Larsen immigrated to Canada, and became a British subject in 1927 (Canadian citizen in 1947). In 1928, he joined the Royal Canadian Mounted Police (RCMP).

== RCMP service ==
In 1928 the RCMP commissioned St. Roch for Arctic service. During its first voyage into the Arctic, Larsen served as mate under a captain that the RCMP hired, but, once in the Arctic, Larsen was appointed captain. Larsen commanded St. Roch for most of the next two decades, rising to the rank of sergeant. In the final years of Larsen's career, he was the senior RCMP officer in the Arctic. Following his command of St. Roch, Larsen was promoted to inspector with responsibility for all Arctic detachments. For the first 12 years that the ship was in commission, Larsen and his crew took supplies to scattered RCMP posts in Canada's far north. St. Roch was specially constructed to be able to survive being frozen-in all winter. During the winter, the RCMP officers who formed her crew used dog sleds to turn St. Roch into a floating RCMP outpost. During this time, St. Roch was the only Canadian presence in the far north, carrying out various governmental duties.

== Exploring the Northwest Passage ==
=== 1940-1942: west to east ===
This journey was the second ship crossing of the Northwest Passage and the first from west to east. The route was nearly the same as Roald Amundsen's 1903 coast-hugging east–west crossing except that Larsen used the Bellot Strait. Documents found in the RCMP archives in the 1990s show that the voyage was somehow connected to a Canadian plan to occupy Greenland after the German invasion of Denmark. The Germans could have occupied the island, seized the cryolite mine and used the island as a U-boat base. The Canadian plan was blocked by the United States but Larsen's voyage went ahead anyway. St. Roch left Vancouver in June 1940. After trouble with ice east of Point Barrow he decided to winter at Walker Bay on the west coast of Victoria Island at the entrance to Prince of Wales Strait. In July 1941 the ship was released from the ice and Larsen followed the coast east and reached Amundsen's Gjoa Haven by the end of August. Turning north up the channel he was struck by the full force of the ice just north of King William Island. In early September he found refuge at Paisley (or Pasley) Bay on the west coast of the Boothia Peninsula near the North Magnetic Pole. In August 1942 he forced his way out of the ice, went north and with difficulty passed the Bellot Strait. At the other end he found civilization of a sort at the Hudson's Bay Company post at Fort Ross on Somerset Island. He then continued through Prince Regent Inlet, Lancaster Sound and the Davis Strait, reaching Halifax on 11 October 1942.

A highly detailed account of this voyage is given in the book 'Plowing the Arctic' (1944) by G. J. Tranter.

=== 1944: east to west ===
This was the third ship crossing of the Northwest Passage, the second east–west crossing and the first to be made in one season (7,295 miles in 86 days). Instead of the standard route along the coast he used the Parry Channel and Prince of Wales Strait. Fitted with a more powerful engine, St. Roch left Halifax on 25 July 1944 and by 20 August was at Beechey Island. Continuing west he reached William Edward Parry's Winter Harbour on Melville Island. As usual for explorers at this place, he tried to enter McClure Strait to the northwest and, as usual, was blocked by ice. Next he turned southwest and passed through the Prince of Wales Strait, apparently the first ship to do so . Passing Walker Bay where he had wintered four years previously, on 4 September he reached the Hudson's Bay Company post at Holman Island, on the west coast of Victoria Island. Just one day before this post had been supplied by the Fort Ross which had sailed from Halifax and through the Panama Canal and Bering Strait. With about a month left before the ice would probably close in, he hurried west, passed through the Bering Strait and reached Vancouver on 16 October.

=== Larsen's explorations and Canadian sovereignty ===
Some believe the real purpose of the voyages of discovery was not to patrol the Arctic searching for evidence of German infiltrators, but rather to protect Canadian interests from her American allies. There were difficulties in the American/Canadian alliance during World War II, manifested during the construction of the Alaska Highway.

== Legacy ==
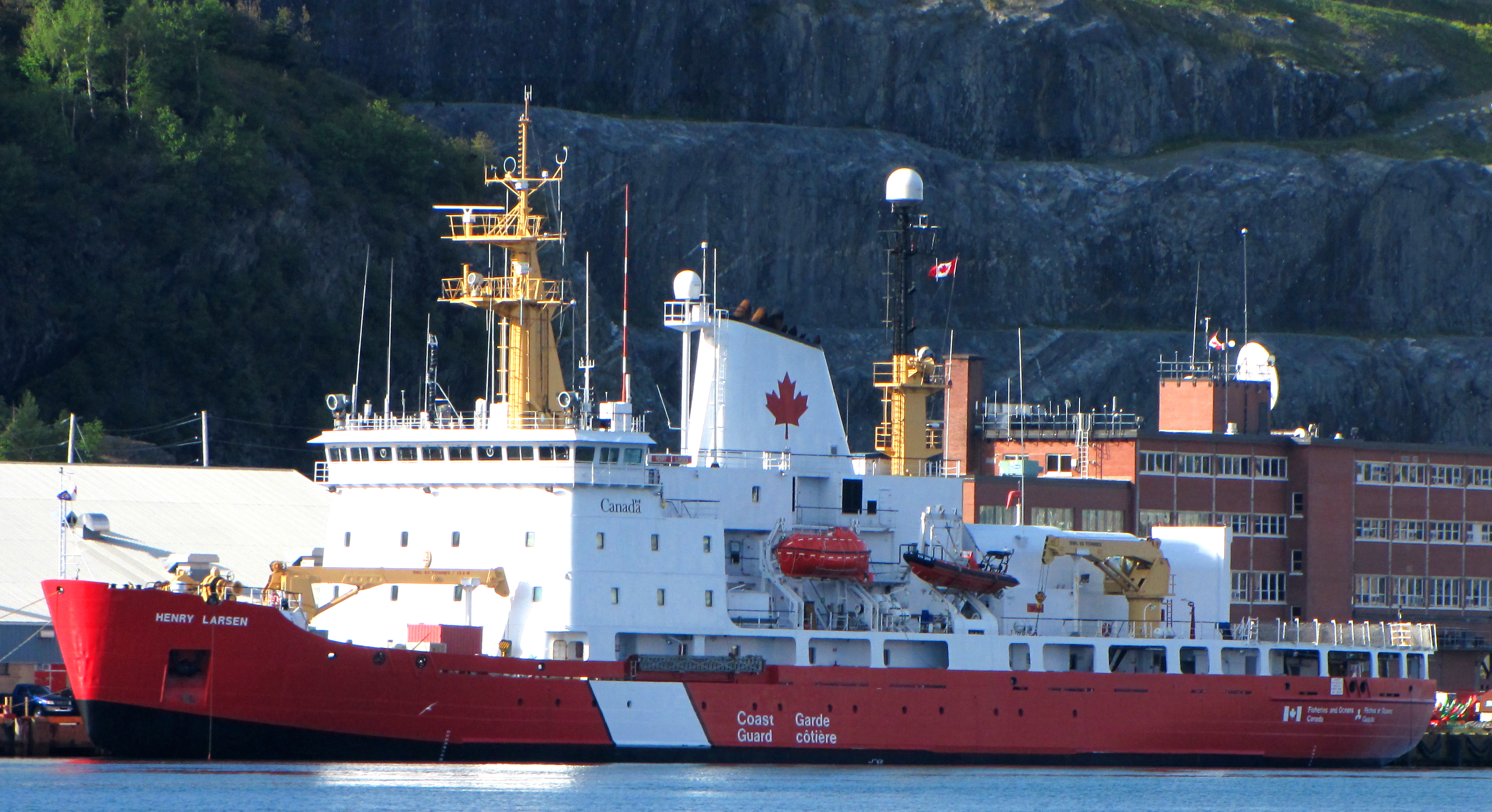
CCGS Henry Larsen in St. John's Harbour, 2010

In 1946 he was awarded the Royal Geographical Society's Patron's Medal for his achievements. In 1959, the Royal Canadian Geographical Society awarded him their first Massey Medal.

Larsen Sound, a body of water located in the Arctic to the west of Boothia Peninsula and north of Victoria Strait, was named for him. In 2000, as a millennium project, the RCMP renamed one of its vessels the St. Roch II, and sent it to recreate Larsen's first voyage. The St. Roch is currently located in the Vancouver Maritime Museum, where visitors can view and board the ship. The Canadian Coast Guard also named an icebreaker CCGS Henry Larsen to honour him.

In the Stan Rogers song "Take It from Day to Day" a crew member aboard St. Roch laments of how "Larsen's got us under his thumb."

There is a public elementary school in Ottawa named in his honour. It was opened in 1987.

== Notes and references ==
- Glyn Williams, Arctic Labyrinth, 2009, Chapter 21
