= Kakulu Saggiaktok =

Inuk artist (1940–2020)

- Born: 1940
- Died: 2020 (aged 79–80)
- Known for: Visual Art

Kakulu Saggiaktok (1940–2020) was an Inuk artist.

== Early life ==
Kakulu Saggiaktok was born in 1940 aboard the Hudson Bay Company supply ship, Nascopie, which was en route from Clyde River to Pangnirtung. Her parents and older brother (Qavaroak Tunnillie) were part of a small group of Inuit who traveled from south Baffin Island to the northern region to trap and hunt. Her mother, Ikayukta Tunnillie, was a graphic artist as well.

In the 1960s she moved to Cape Dorset, and began to draw as part of the West Baffin Eskimo Cooperative. Her work often depicts animals. Since 1966, her work has been featured in many Cape Dorset Annual Print Collections.

== Career ==
She was best known for her work on paper. Her work is held in several museums, including the Agnes Etherington Art Centre, the McMaster Museum of Art, the University of Michigan Museum of Art, the Montreal Museum of Fine Arts, the National Gallery of Canada, the Winnipeg Art Gallery, the Art Gallery of Greater Victoria, the Canada Council Art Bank, the National Museum of the American Indian, the Brunnier Art Museum, and the Amon Carter Museum of American Art.

She married the sculptor Saggiaktok, and they had four children.
