= Aklavik (HBC vessel) =

Hudson's Bay Company cargo vessel

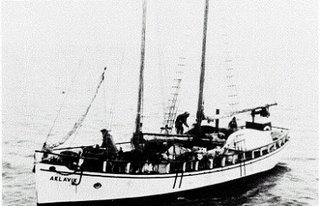
- Aklavik, a Hudson's Bay Company cargo vessel, that may have made an unofficial transit of the Northwest Passage

History
- Name: Aklavik
- Operator: Hudson's Bay Company
- Port of registry: Winnipeg

General characteristics
- Length: 60 ft (18 m)
- Installed power: 35 shp (26 kW) auxiliary engine
- Capacity: 45 tons

Aklavik was a small cargo vessel the Hudson's Bay Company used to carry supplies to, and furs from, its outposts in the high Arctic. She was active in the first half of the 20th century.

== Construction ==
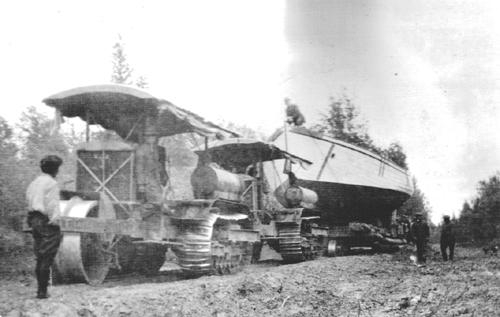
A tractor tows Aklavik over the Fort Smith portage, to her real launch, in 1923.

She was 60 ft (18 m) long, had a cargo capacity of about 45 tons, and was mainly propelled by sail, although she had a 35-shaft-horsepower (26 kW) auxiliary engine.

Aklavik was built in Vancouver, then shipped, by rail, to Fort McMurray, then the northernmost terminus of the North American railgrid. Until the railgrid was extended to the riverport of Hay River, on Great Slave Lake, every vessel operating on, or transiting, the Mackenzie River, was shipped to Fort McMurray, then proceeded to a portage around the extensive rapids on the Slave River, near Fort Smith. Aklavik was towed from Fort McMurray to the portage, without any engines. Used engines were installed after she transited the portage.

Aklavik was registered in Winnipeg.

== Operational history ==
She was frozen in, over-winter, in Bernard Harbour, in 1930, resulting in her sinking, but she was refloated.

Some sources report that Aklavik was actually the second vessel to traverse the Northwest Passage, in 1937, under the command of Scotty Gall, not the Royal Canadian Mounted Police (RCMP) schooner St. Roch.

According to the Hudson's Bay Company, however, since, after transiting the Bellot Strait, to Baffin Bay, she rendezvoused with a larger ship in the company's fleet, Nascopie, transferred some cargo, and then turned around, stopping short of a full traverse of the passage. Later in 1942, the ship was sold, for $1, to Patsy Klengenberg, son of Christian Klengenberg, for him to resupply trading posts at King William Island. On 31 August 1946, Klengenberg had anchored the Aklavik at Cambridge Bay. While starting the engine a fire broke out, the ship exploded and Klengenberg was killed.
