= Brentford Bay =

Bay in Nunavut, Canada

- Location within Nunavut
- Location: Western Gulf of Boothia
- Coordinates: 71°54′N 94°08′W
- Basin countries: Canada

Brentford Bay is an Arctic waterway in the Kitikmeot Region, Nunavut, Canada. It is located in the west of the Gulf of Boothia.

To the north of the bay is the former trading post of Fort Ross on Somerset Island To the west is the Murchison Promontory, to the south is the Boothia Peninsula, and to the east the bay opens into the Gulf of Boothia.
