= Ikayukta Tunnillie =

Inuk printmaker (1911–1980)

- Born: 1911; Nunavut
- Died: 1980 (aged 68–69); Cape Dorset, Northwest Territories (now Kinngait, Nunavut)
- Other names: Tunnillie Tunnillie, Ikajukta Tunnillie, Ekayutaq Tunnillie
- Occupation(s): Artist in printmaking, drawing

Ikayukta Tunnillie (Inuktitut syllabics: ᐃᑯᔪᑕ; also known as Tunnillie Tunnillie, Ikajukta Tunnillie, Ekayutaq Tunnillie, 1911–1980) was an Inuk artist in the fields of printmaking and drawing. Tunnillie was born in Cape Dorset, Northwest Territories, now Kinngait, Nunavut and travelled for much of her life. Tunnillie's work in drawing and printmaking focused on animals and life in the Arctic. She was one of the oldest printmakers to work with the West Baffin Eskimo Cooperative.

== Early life ==
Tunnillie's exact birth date is unknown, which is typical of that time in Nunavut. She was born somewhere near Frobisher Bay, Nunavut in 1911.

== Family life and travelling ==
As a teen, Tunnillie was taken in by an older man named Iyola Tunili. Tunili already had a wife named Samalinga, but also wished to marry Ikayukta. The family lived in harmony together. The family included Tunili, his first wife Samalinga, their child, and Ikayukta. They spent many years on the move, travelling from Resolute Bay, to Clyde River, Pangnirtung, Nettilling Lake and finally to Cape Dorset. They lived in skin tents which they made and travelled by dogsled. As a young woman, Tunnillie travelled on the SS Nascopie from the south Baffin area to the Arctic Bay and the north Baffin coast. Tunnillie's first child was born aboard the Nascopie. After Iyola died from a respiratory infection, Tunnillie continued to travel with her second husband, Nungusweetuk. Tunnillie only settled in Cape Dorset in 1970, at the age of 59.

== Career ==
Tunnillie began printmaking with the West Baffin Eskimo Co-operative, which was a craft centre and Co-op store that formed in 1959. The Co-op was instrumental in bringing stonecut image art to the area. The practice was brought to the co-op by James Houston, who spent four months in Japan studying the art form. The Hudson's Bay Company and the Canadian Guild of Crafts provided supplies for the co-op. Tunnillie's daughter Kakulu, who became a successful artist herself, began drawing before Ikayukta. Kakulu encouraged her mother to start drawing while Tunnillie was living in Aqiatalaulavik with her son. Her work was first exhibited in the 1971 Cape Dorset Annual Collection, and she was one of only 14 artists featured in the collection. Tunnillie also found financial empowerment through her artwork. In an interview with the Cape Dorset Collection, she recalled carrying her art to the co-op to sell it. Tunnillie remarked, "I get pleasure out of drawing when I feel like it. And also when there is not enough money to buy food I know that I can help [my family] by selling some drawings. When I notice that there is something missing or that my family doesn't have enough food for the weekend or the week, that's when I draw – and also, when I feel like drawing, that's when I draw". Selling drawings to the co-op was Tunnillie's only source of income. Tunnillie was very humble about her work, stating in the Dorset Annual Collection of 1980, "Even though I can't really draw well, it's fortunate that they put my prints in a book like this – even through I can't draw like the others do.

Tunnillie's work was featured in exhibits at:

- Department of Indian Affairs and Northern Development and the National Museum of Man, Ottawa, Ontario
- Winnipeg Art Gallery, Winnipeg, Manitoba
- Inuit Gallery of Vancouver, Vancouver, British Columbia
- Rideau Hall presented by Indian and Northern Affairs Canada, Ottawa, Ontario
- Department of Indian Affairs and Northern Development and Canadian Arctic Producers, Ottawa, Ontario
- Los Angeles, California, United States
- Scarsdale, New York, United States
- Hartsdale, New York, United States
- Hastings-on-Hudson, New York, United States
- McMichael Canadian Collection, Kleinberg, Ontario
- Muscarelle Museum of Art College of William and Mary Williamsburg, Virginia, United States

Solo collections:

- Ikayukta Retrospect: Stonecuts, lithographs and drawings from 1972 to 1980, Inuit Gallery of Vancouver, Vancouver, British Columbia

Featured artist:

- 1978 Cape Dorset Annual Collection

== Later life ==
Tunnillie became a mother to two children, Qavaroak in 1928 and Kakulu in 1940. She also became a grandmother and was widowed sometime before 1975. In 1980, the Cape Dorset Collection reported that she was house ridden because of painful joints. At that time she was living with her grandson and his family. Her last contribution to an exhibit was as part of the 21st annual Cape Dorset collection in 1980. She died that year in Cape Dorset as one of the oldest printmakers in the community.
