= Batty Bay =

Bay in Nunavut, Canada

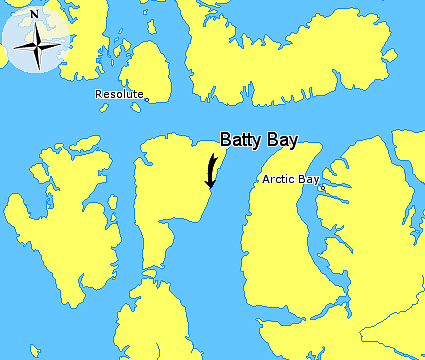
- Batty Bay, Somerset Island, Nunavut, Canada.

- Location within Nunavut Location within Canada
- Location: Prince Regent Inlet
- Coordinates: 73°14′N 91°25′W
- Ocean/sea sources: Arctic Ocean
- Basin countries: Canada
- Max. length: 10 km (6.2 mi)
- Settlements: Uninhabited

Batty Bay is a narrow bay in the Qikiqtaaluk Region, Nunavut, Canada. It is an arm of Prince Regent Inlet on the eastern side of Somerset Island.

== History ==
It was an area frequented by Arctic explorers such as Sir John Franklin and Captain John Ross, who left his boats there in 1832. The explorer William Kennedy wintered there in 1852.
