= Fort Ross, Nunavut =

Abandoned human settlement in Nunavut, Canada

Fort Ross
- Abandoned trading post
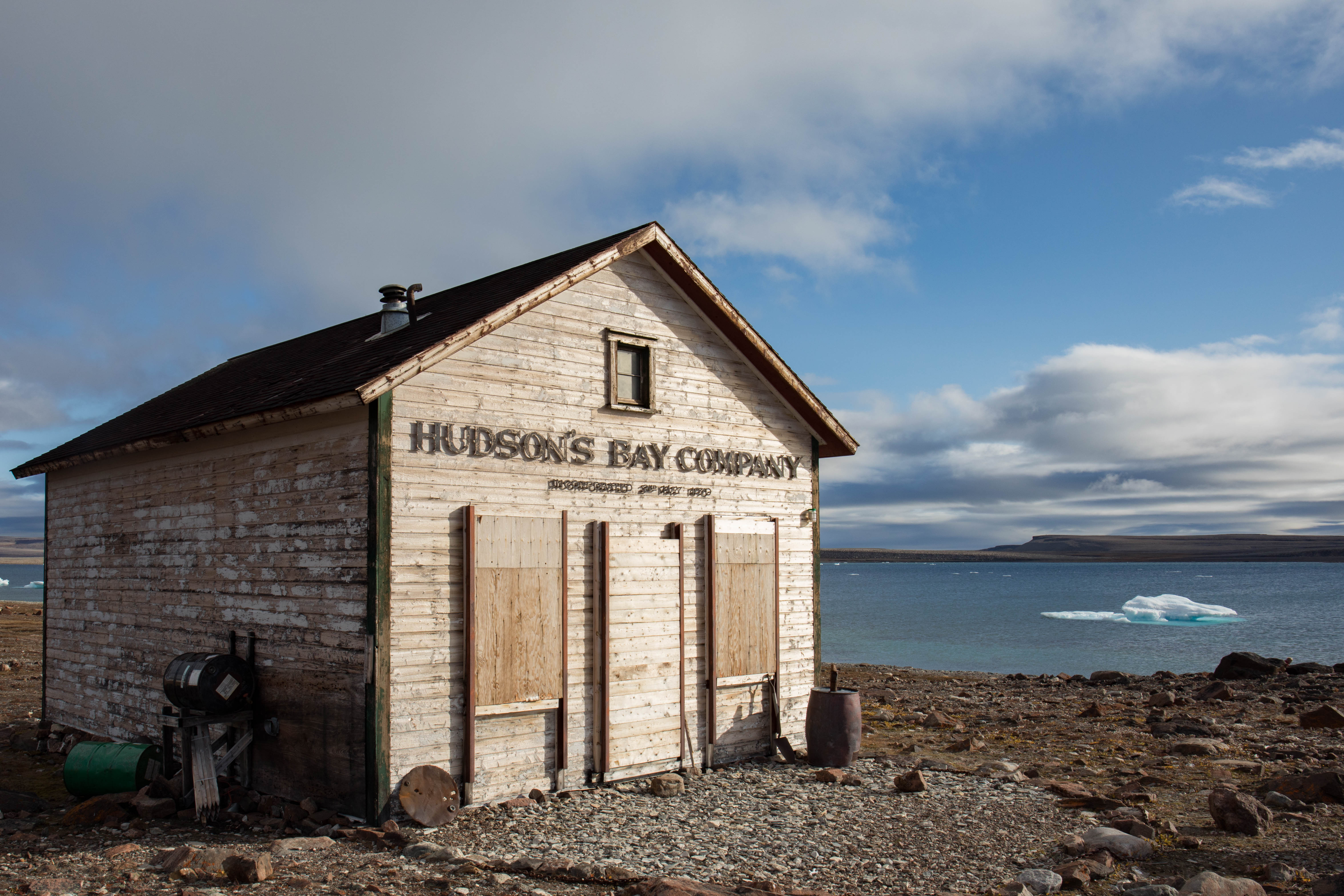
- The post's store building in 2017

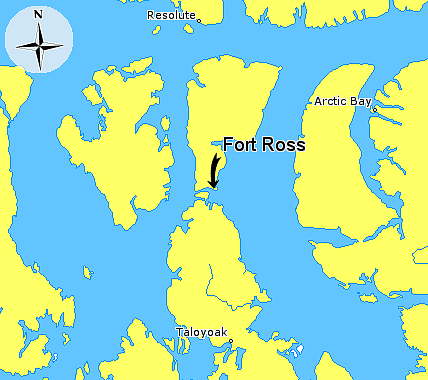
- Map indicating Fort Ross, with nearby settlements shown

- Fort Ross location in Nunavut Fort Ross (Canada)
- Coordinates: 72°00′N 094°14′W
- Country: Canada
- Territory: Nunavut
- Region: Kitikmeot
- Established: 1937
- Founder: Hudson's Bay Company
- Named for: John Ross and James Clark Ross
- Elevation: 5 m (16 ft)

Population
  - Total: 0
- Time zone: UTC-07:00 (MST)

Fort Ross is an abandoned former trading post on Somerset Island, in the Kitikmeot Region of Nunavut, Canada. Founded in 1937, it was the last trading post to be established by the Hudson's Bay Company. It was operational for only eleven years, being abandoned in 1948, as severe ice conditions in the surrounding waters made the site hard to reach and economically unviable.

== Geography ==
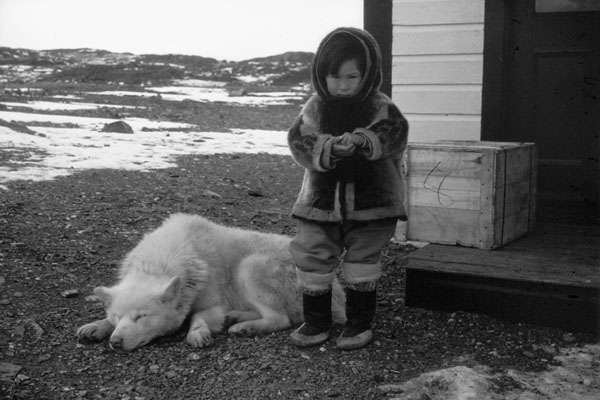
An Inuk child and dog at Fort Ross in 1945

The post is situated at the eastern end of Bellot Strait, on a southeastern peninsula of Somerset Island, between Hazard Inlet and Brentford Bay. The site is close to the shore of the small Depot Bay, at an approximate elevation of 5 m (16 ft) above sea level. The nearest inhabited places are Taloyoak, 275 km (171 mi) to the south, Resolute, 300 km (190 mi) to the north, and Arctic Bay, 325 km (202 mi) to the northeast. The site is 500 km (310 mi) from Cambridge Bay, the regional centre, 1,400 km (870 mi) from Iqaluit, the territorial capital, and 3,100 km (1,900 mi) from Ottawa.

== History ==
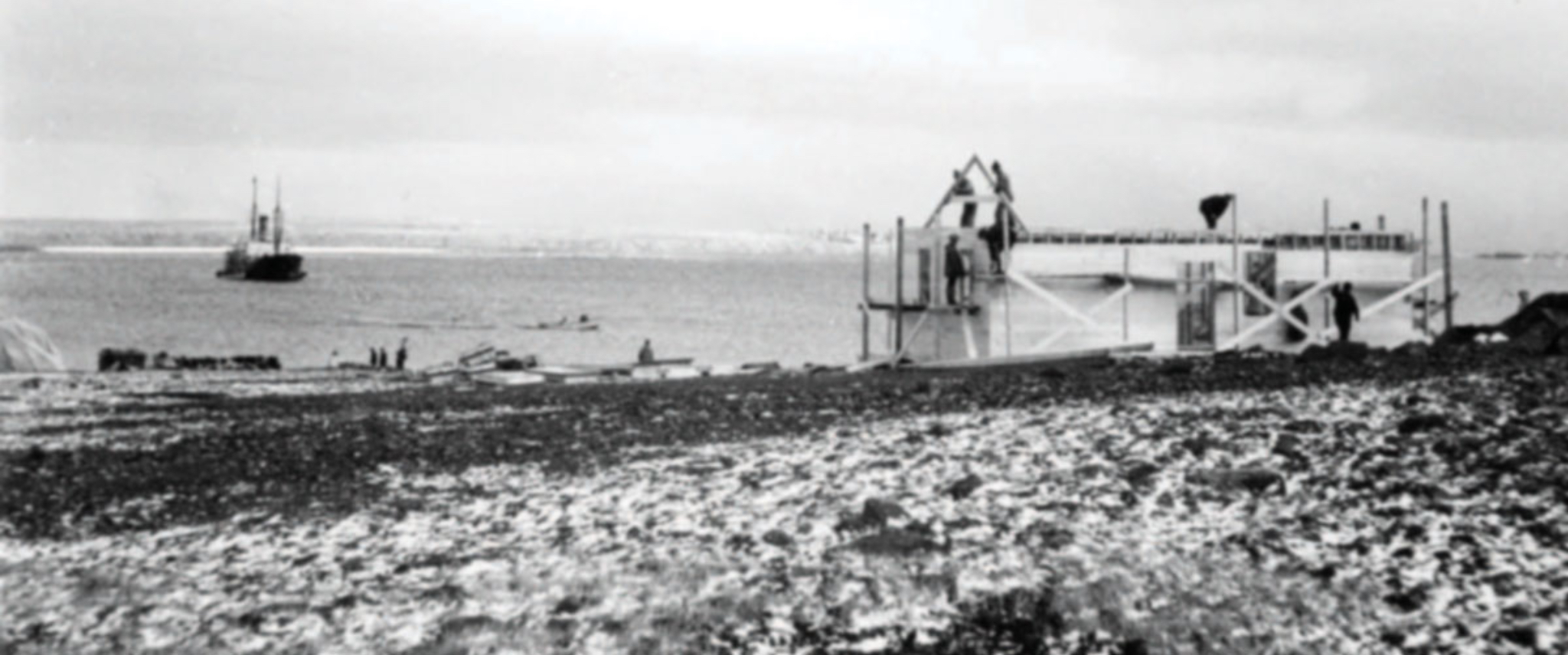
The post manager's house being built in September 1937

Fort Ross was established in 1937 by the Hudson's Bay Company. Its establishment was meant to capitalize on fur opportunities on the island, and to facilitate company trade passing through the Bellot Strait. Its exact location was chosen by its first manager and longtime trader Lorenz Learmonth. The post was named after related Arctic explorers John Ross and James Clark Ross.

Its four buildings: the post manager's house, a power house, a warehouse, and a store, were built over 5 days in September 1937, following the 2 September arrival of the icebreaker SS Nascopie, which brought construction and food supplies. Also arriving on the Nascopie were the post's first inhabitants: Lorenz Learmonth and other staff for the post, including two clerks, and three Inuit families from Cape Dorset who built their homes near the four post buildings. Explorer Henry Larsen reached it in 1942, during his traversal of the Northwest Passage, the first successful navigation from west to east.

After the annual resupply of the post in 1941, the next two resupplies by the Nascopie, of 1942 and 1943, failed to reach Fort Ross due to ice conditions. After the Nascopie was forced to turn back in September 1943, plans were made to evacuate the staff of the post, as food supplies had dwindled significantly, despite rationing and supplementing the supplies through hunting. As all Canadian planes suited to perform the evacuation were unavailable due to the country's participation in World War II, the Canadian government requested assistance from the United States In November, a United States Army Air Forces (USAAF) Douglas C-47 Skytrain was outfitted for the trip. On 4 November, some supplies were airdropped, and USAAF Captain J.F Stanwell-Fletcher parachuted down to the post to prepare a landing site for the plane, in what was the first parachute jump north of the Arctic Circle. The largest lake on Somerset Island, Stanwell-Fletcher Lake, was later named after him. On 7 November, after a landing strip was prepared on a small lake about 16 km (10 mi) away from the post, the plane landed, deposited the remaining supplies for the Inuit population, and quickly took off again, successfully evacuating the three staff of the post.

In 1944, the Nascopie was able to reach Fort Ross, and the post was reestablished, with a new manager. However, pack ice continued to make resupply of the post and trade through the Bellot Strait difficult, and the post was abandoned in 1948. The post, along with the resident Inuit, relocated 275 km (171 mi) to the south, establishing Spence Bay (now Taloyoak).

Only two of the four buildings remain: the post manager's house and the store. The store building was recently refurbished and strengthened, and is still used as a shelter by Inuit caribou hunters from Taloyoak, and as a refuge for researchers and small boat travellers passing through. In the summer of 2006, CBC's The National visited Fort Ross in their travels on the Coast Guard icebreaker Louis S. St-Laurent in a special series focused on climate change.

== Notable residents ==
- Bill Lyall
