= SS Nascopie =

Steamship

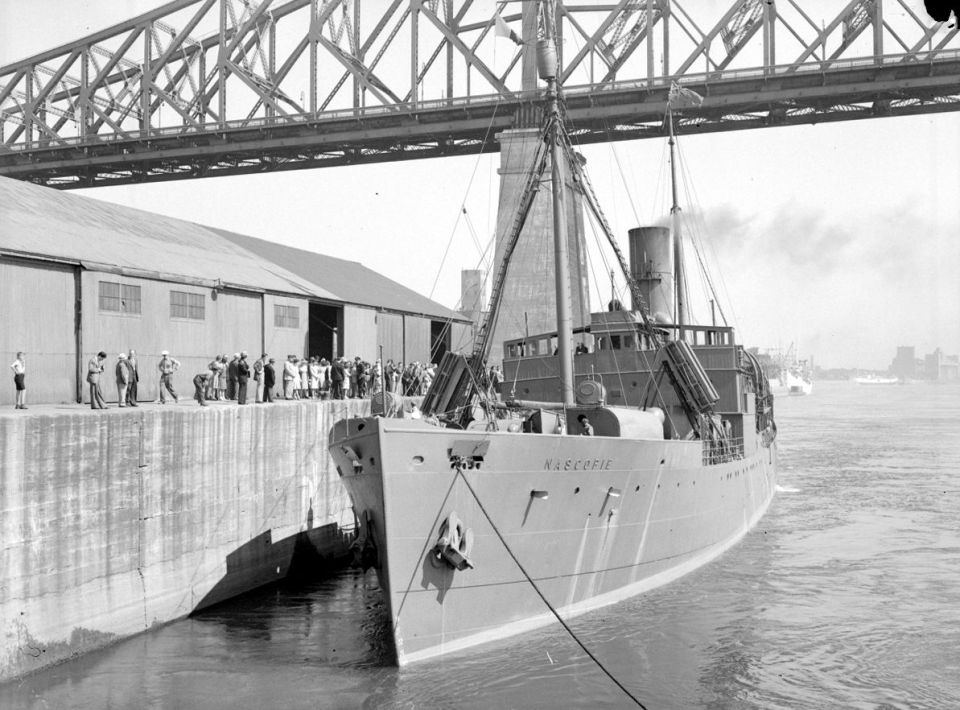
- Nascopie in the Port of Montreal, 1945

History
- Name: RMS Nascopie
- Owner: Hudson's Bay Company
- Ordered: 6 March 1928
- Builder: Swan Hunter and Wigham Richardson, Newcastle upon Tyne
- Launched: December 7, 1911
- In service: 1912
- Identification: Official Number 129922; Code Letters GPLS
- Nickname(s): Eastern Arctic Patrol
- Fate: Wrecked July 21, 1947

General characteristics
- Tonnage: 2,521 GRT
- Length: 285.5 ft (87.0 m)
- Beam: 43.5 ft (13.3 m)
- Draft: 17.5 ft (5.3 m)forward; 22 ft (6.7 m)aft
- Installed power: 1x 3-cyl. triple expansion steam engine, single shaft. Output: 342 nhp
- Propulsion: 1 screw
- Speed: 14.1 knots

RMS Nascopie was a steamship built by Swan Hunter and Wigham Richardson of Newcastle upon Tyne, England. She was launched on December 7, 1911, and achieved speeds of 14.1 knots (26 km/h) during her sea trials. She was powered by triple expansion steam engines with cylinders 21.5, 35.5 and 58 inches (546, 902, and 1,473 mm) in diameter and a stroke of 42 inches (1067 mm). Her boiler pressure was 180 pounds-force per square inch (1.24 MPa) and the two main boilers were 15 feet in diameter and 11.5 feet long, fired by six furnaces.

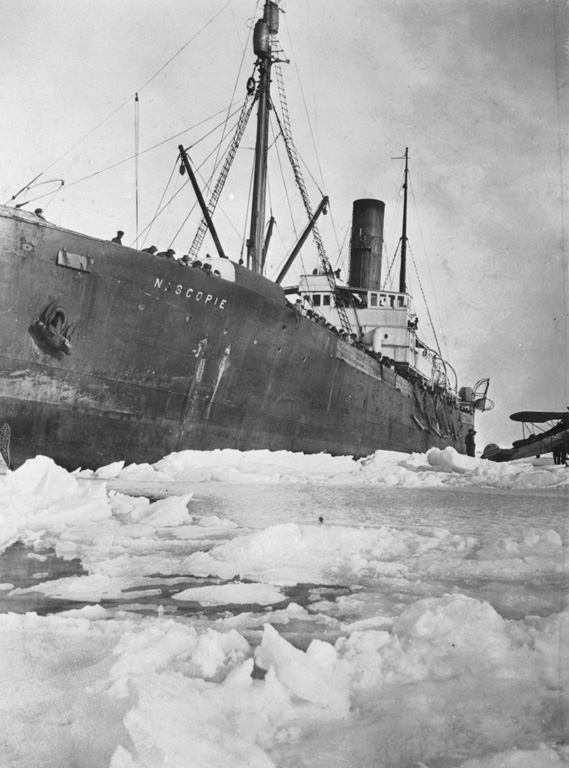
Nascopie in 1927.

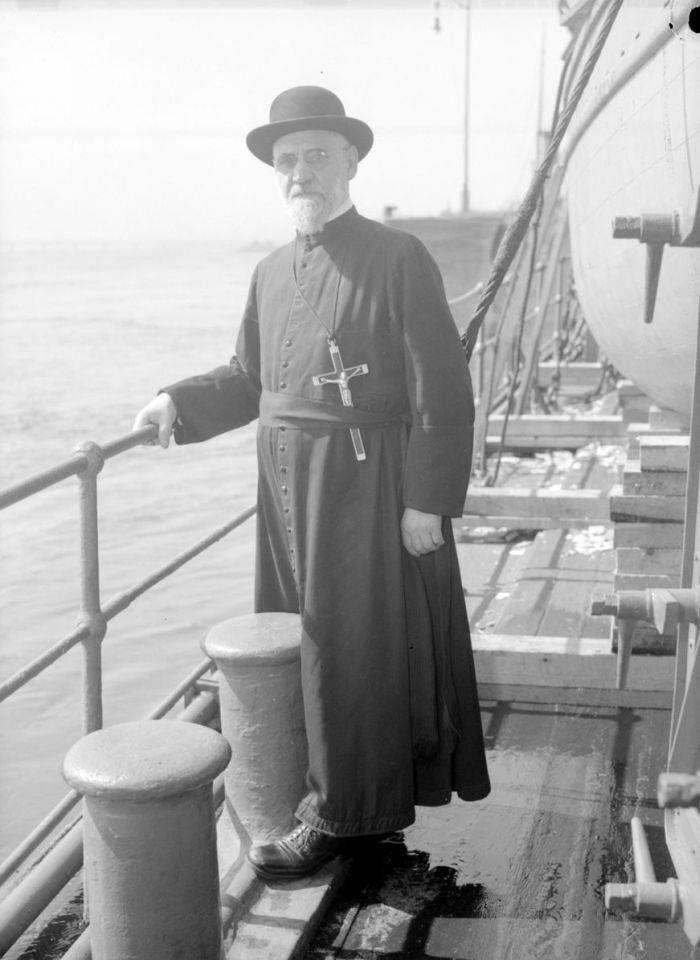
A passenger on board Nascopie in 1945

Nascopie was fitted with an ice breaker bow and her plates were of five-eighths-inch steel. She carried Marconi apparatus located beside the wheelhouse on the upper deck. Her maiden crew was from the Dominion of Newfoundland under Captain Smith and they sailed for Penarth, South Wales, in late January 1912 to take on a load of coal bound for St. John's, Newfoundland. That winter she was employed in the annual seal hunt of the coast of Newfoundland under Captain Barbour for the Job Brothers mercantile business at St. John's.

Soon after World War I broke out the Russian government was in dire need of ships with ice breaking capacity, It placed orders with British shipyards and at the same time began a campaign of purchasing icebreakers on the open market. Russian representatives first went to Ottawa and purchased the icebreakers Earl Grey and Minto. They then purchased from the Reid Newfoundland Company the icebreaking mail steamers Bruce and Lintrose. They then began negotiations with A. J. Harvey and Co. for the purchase of Bellaventure, Bonaventure, and Adventure and with Job Brothers for Beothic and Nascopie. They purchased all except for Nascopie which continued her supply route to service the Hudson Bay operations.

In 1916, when chartered by the government of France, and carrying cargo from Russia to Newfoundland, she encountered a German U-boat, and exchanged gunfire. She drove off the U-boat, but was credited with sinking it, at the time.

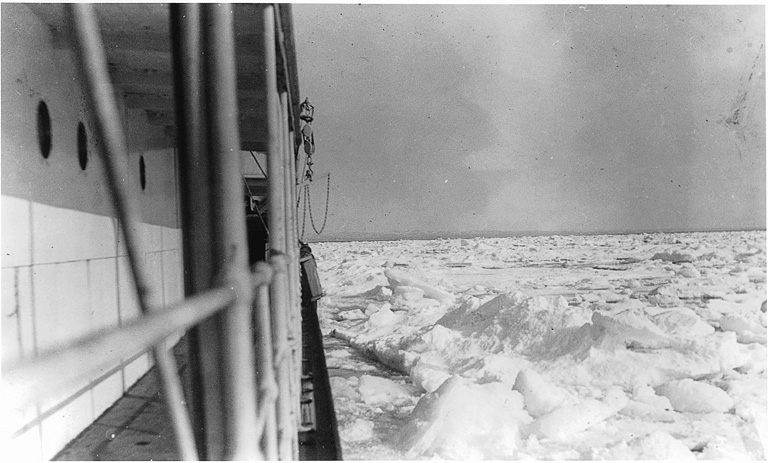
Icepack, view from the deck, photo taken by George E. Mack

George E. Mack (1887–1941) a keen amateur photographer, joined the HBC in 1910, he served on the Nascopie twice, firstly as Second Officer in 1912, then again as Captain from 1915 to 1920; first as Master and then as Ice Master/Pilot, when he became a Superintendent of the Hudson's Bay Company from 1920 to 1928. He took many photographs of the local communities the ship visited.

In 1934 Nascopie took for the first time a Governor of the company to ever visit Hudson Bay. HBC Governor Patrick Ashley Cooper and his wife joined her in Montreal and sailed as far as Churchill. In 1937, the ship enabled the Hudson's Bay Company in establishing Fort Ross. Sailing from the east, she met the schooner Aklavik, which had sailed from the west into Bellot Strait. This meeting of the two ships at Fort Ross, brought into reality for the first time the Northwest Passage.

During the second World War, she was fitted with anti-aircraft gun, and a 3.7 inch Naval gun, she was used to ship carry cryolite for making Aluminum for the war effort.

Nascopie was wrecked near Cape Dorset near the southern tip of Baffin Island on an uncharted reef, July 21, 1947.
