= SS Beothic =

A number of steamships were named Beothic, including:

- SS Beothic (1909), a Norwegian sealing ship in service 1909–29
- SS Beothic (1918), a Canadian cargo ship in service 1925–40
