= Boothia Peninsula =

Peninsula in Nunavut, Canada

Coordinates: 71°N 94°W

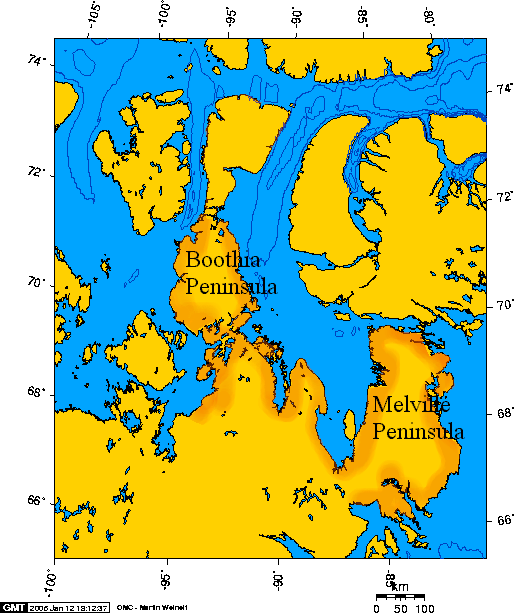
Boothia Peninsula and Melville Peninsula, Nunavut, Canada.

Boothia Peninsula (/ˈbuːθiə/; formerly Boothia Felix, Inuktitut Kingngailap Nunanga) is a large peninsula in Nunavut's northern Canadian Arctic, south of Somerset Island. The northern part, Murchison Promontory, is the northernmost point of mainland Canada.

== Geography ==
Bellot Strait (Ikirahaq) separates the peninsula from Somerset Island to the north. Babbage Bay is on the east coast, as is Abernethy Bay, just to the south. The community of Taloyoak lies in the far south and is the peninsula's only significant population centre. Paisley Bay is on the west coast, as is Wrottesley Inlet (between Paisley Bay and Bellot Strait).

Prior to the detachment of Nunavut in 1999, the Boothia Peninsula and the nearby Melville Peninsula were the only parts of mainland Canada that belonged to the District of Franklin in the then Northwest Territories. The balance of the District of Franklin was all situated within the Arctic Archipelago.

== Geology and paleontology ==
On the peninsula there are outcrops of Early Ordovician rocks, over which Late Ordovician and Silurian rocks are identified (Middle Ordovician is not exposed). Over 1000 conodont fossils of 37 species in 28 genera were collected from these strata. Genera include Teridontus, Cordylodus, Rossodus, Variabiloconus, Semiacontiodus, Drepanoistodus, Parapanderodus, Ulrichodina, Acodus, Colaptoconus, Polyplacognathus, Pteracontiodus, Milaculum and Phosphannulus. Conodont zones are distinguished in Lower and Upper Ordovician.

== Exploration ==
John Ross was forced by ice to stop for four years at its easternmost point starting in 1829. He named it after his patron Sir Felix Booth. Ross encountered a large Inuit community whom he described as living in "snow cottages" (i.e., igloos) and immortalized in Ross's painting North Hendon. In 1831, his nephew James Clark Ross went overland and reached the north magnetic pole which was then on its western side. He also crossed west to King William Island.

Henry Larsen's second successful traverse of the Northwest Passage passed through the Bellot Strait. Larsen deemed the strait too shallow for larger vessels and described how his vessel was almost crushed by ice floes when there was a change in the wind's direction. On his return voyage Larsen passed north of Somerset Island.
