= St. Roch (ship) =

Royal Canadian Mounted Police schooner

Coordinates: 49.2775°N 123.1472°W

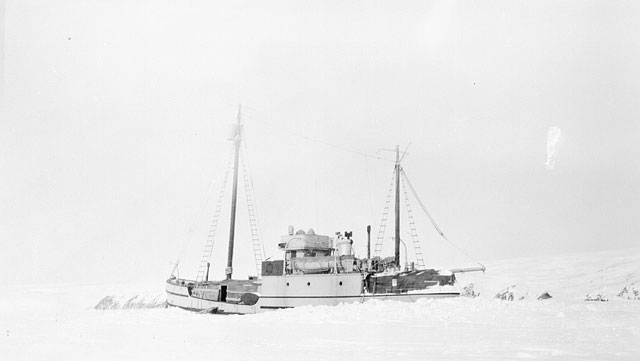
- St. Roch wintering in the Beaufort Sea, 1948.

History

Canada
- Name: St. Roch
- Builder: Burrard Dry Dock Co. Ltd., North Vancouver
- Launched: 7 May 1928
- Status: Museum ship; National Historic Site of Canada at the Vancouver Maritime Museum since 1962

General characteristics
- Type: Auxiliary Police Schooner
- Displacement: 323 long tons (328 t)
- Length: 104 ft 3 in (31.78 m)
- Beam: 24 ft 9 in (7.54 m)
- Draft: 12 ft 6 in (3.81 m)
- Depth of hold: 11 ft (3.4 m)
- Propulsion: Sails; 150 hp (112 kW) diesel engine

National Historic Site of Canada
- Official name: St. Roch National Historic Site of Canada
- Designated: 1962

RCMPV St. Roch is a Royal Canadian Mounted Police schooner, the first ship to completely circumnavigate North America, and the second vessel to transit the Northwest Passage. She was the first ship to complete the Northwest Passage in the west to east direction (Pacific to the Atlantic Ocean), using the same route that Amundsen on the sailing vessel Gjøa had traversed east to west, 38 years earlier.

The ship was most often captained by Henry Larsen.

Liverpool-born Sgt. Fred S. Farrar RCMP (1901–1954) was a crew member of St. Roch for various voyages including the 1950 voyage that circumnavigated North America; he wrote the book Arctic Assignment: The Story of the St. Roch which was published posthumously in 1955.

The Stan Rogers song "Take It From Day To Day" is the lament of a crew member on St. Roch.

The ship is located at the Vancouver Maritime Museum in Vancouver, British Columbia, Canada, and is open to the public for scheduled visits.

== Construction ==
St. Roch was made primarily of thick Douglas fir, with very hard Australian "ironbark" eucalyptus on the outside, and an interior hull reinforced with heavy beams to withstand ice pressure during her Arctic duties. St. Roch was designed by Tom Halliday and was based on Roald Amundsen's ship Maud.

== Service history ==
St. Roch was constructed in 1928 at the Burrard Dry Dock Shipyards in North Vancouver. Between 1929 and 1939 she supplied and patrolled Canada's Arctic.

In 1940–1942 she became the first vessel to complete a voyage through the Northwest Passage in a west to east direction, and in 1944 became the first vessel to make a return trip through the Northwest Passage, traversing the more northerly route considered the true Northwest Passage, and was also the first to navigate the passage in a single season. Between 1944 and 1948 she again patrolled Arctic waters. On May 29, 1950, she became the first vessel to circumnavigate North America, travelling from Halifax, Nova Scotia, to Vancouver via the Panama Canal. In all she made three arctic voyages.

== Exhibition ==
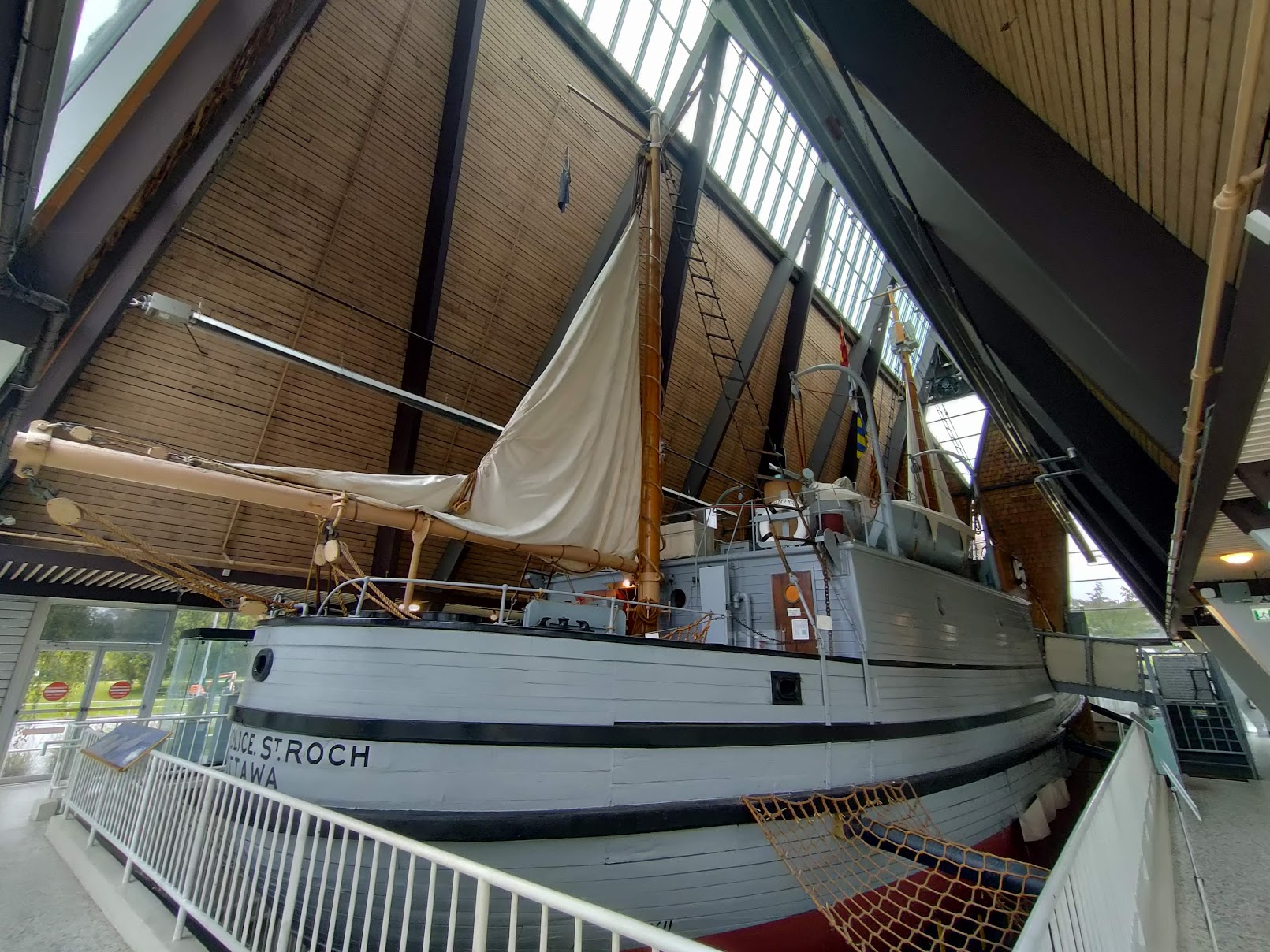
The RCMPV St. Roch on display at the Vancouver Maritime Museum

In 1954, the St. Roch was decommissioned in Halifax and returned to Vancouver. In 1958, she was placed in dry dock at Kitsilano Point for restoration, partly inspiring the location of the planned Vancouver Maritime Museum, which opened the following year. In 1962, St. Roch was designated a National Historic Site of Canada. Although the ship was placed indoors in an A-frame building adjoining the museum, it remained formally under the control of Parks Canada. In 1995 Parks Canada handed over full control of the St. Roch to the museum.

== See also ==
- Museum ship
- List of museum ships
- Ship replica
- Ships preserved in museums
