= Vancouver Maritime Museum =

Maritime museum in Vancouver, Canada

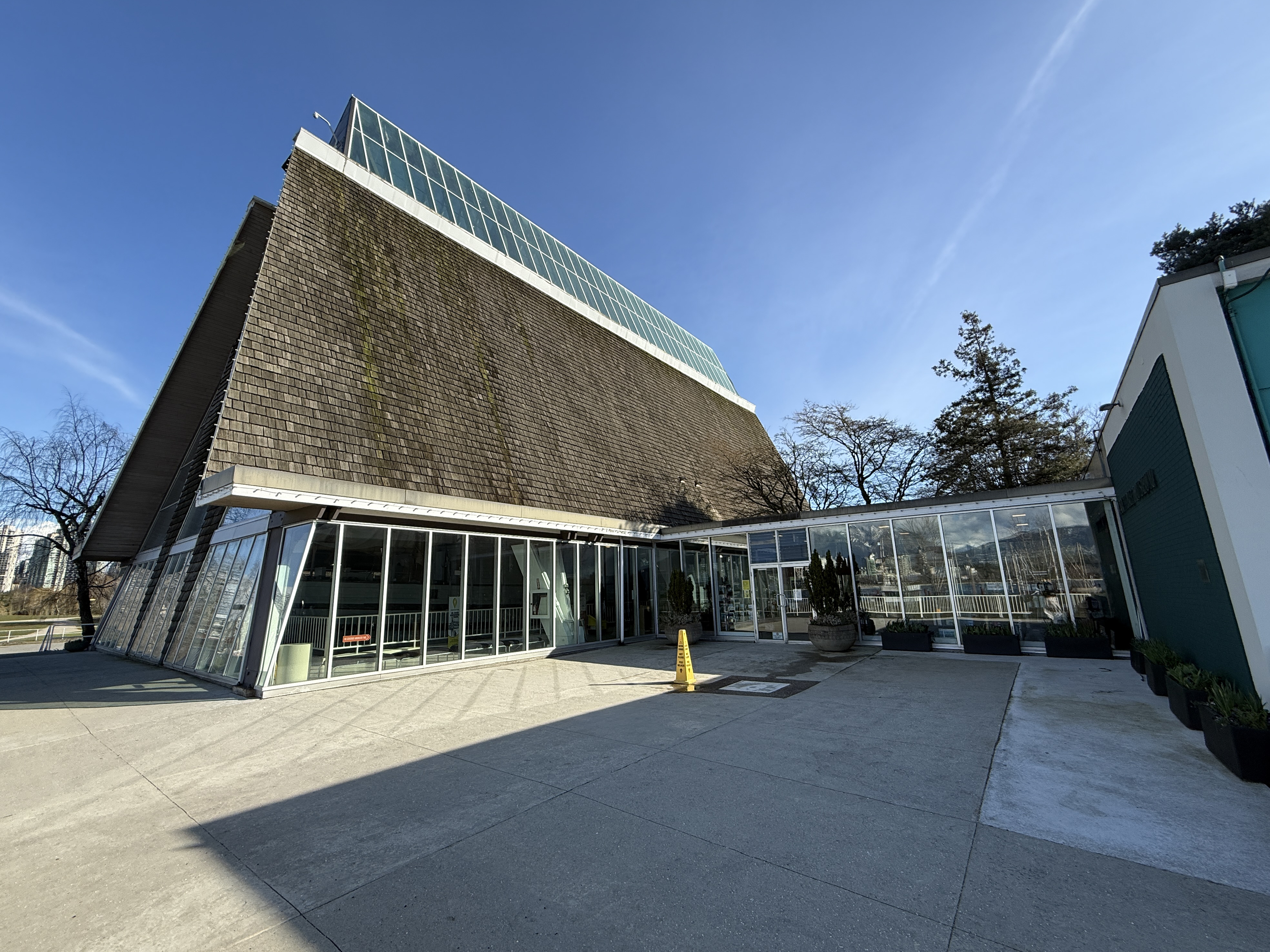

- Location within Greater Vancouver Regional District
- Established: 1959
- Location: 1905 Ogden Avenue; Vancouver, British Columbia, Canada; V6J 1A3
- Coordinates: 49.277507°N 123.147265°W
- Type: Maritime museum
- Director: Dr. Joost Schokkenbroek
- Website: vanmaritime.com

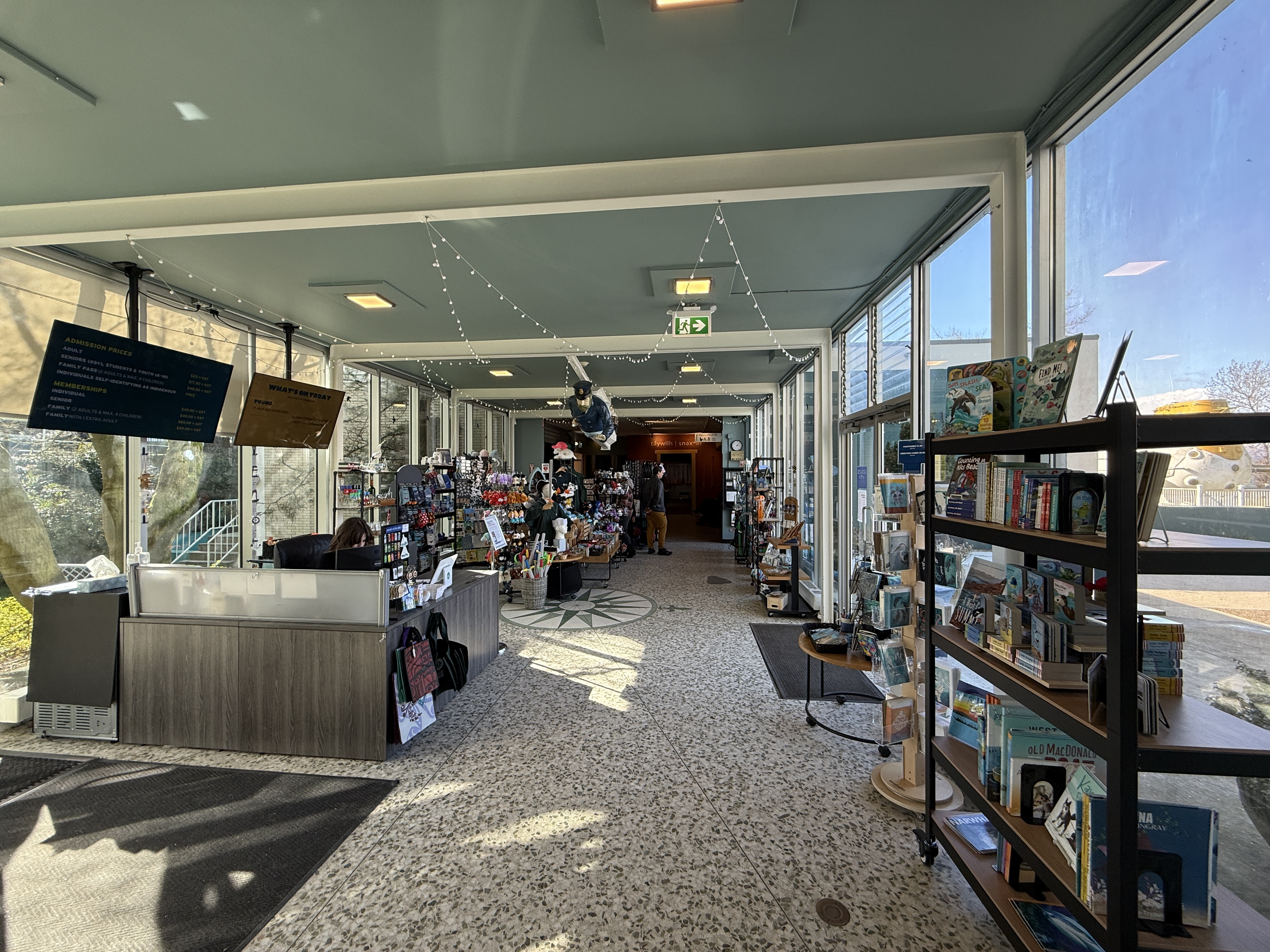
Museum Reception and gift shop

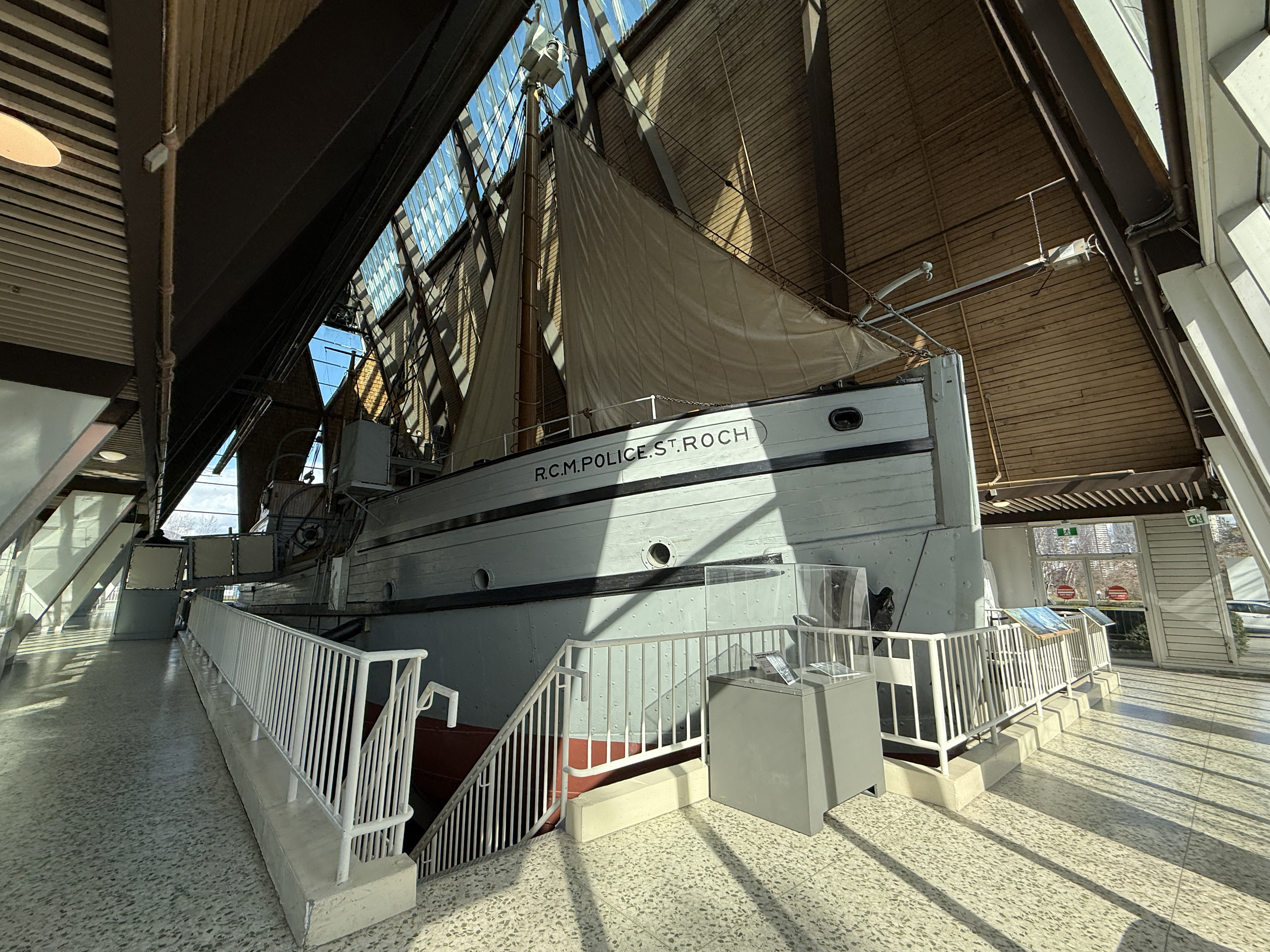
St. Roch in Vancouver Maritime Museum

The Vancouver Maritime Museum is a maritime museum devoted to presenting the maritime history of Vancouver, British Columbia, Canada, and the Canadian Arctic. Opened in 1959 as a Vancouver centennial project, it is located within Vanier Park just west of False Creek on the Vancouver waterfront. The museum is affiliated with CMA, CHIN, and Virtual Museum of Canada.

== Collection ==
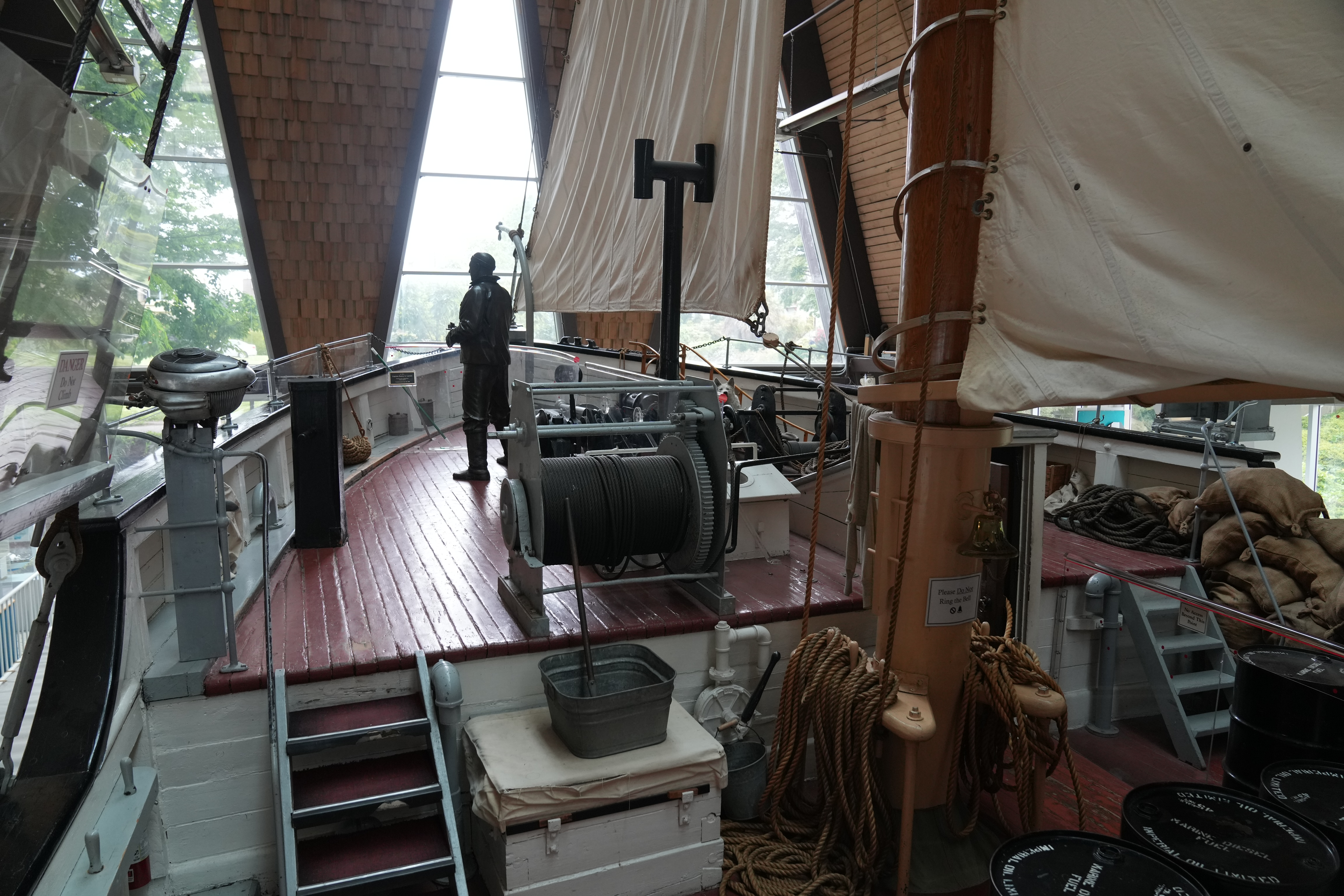
Captain Henry A. Larsen on the foredeck of the R.C.M.P. St. Roch

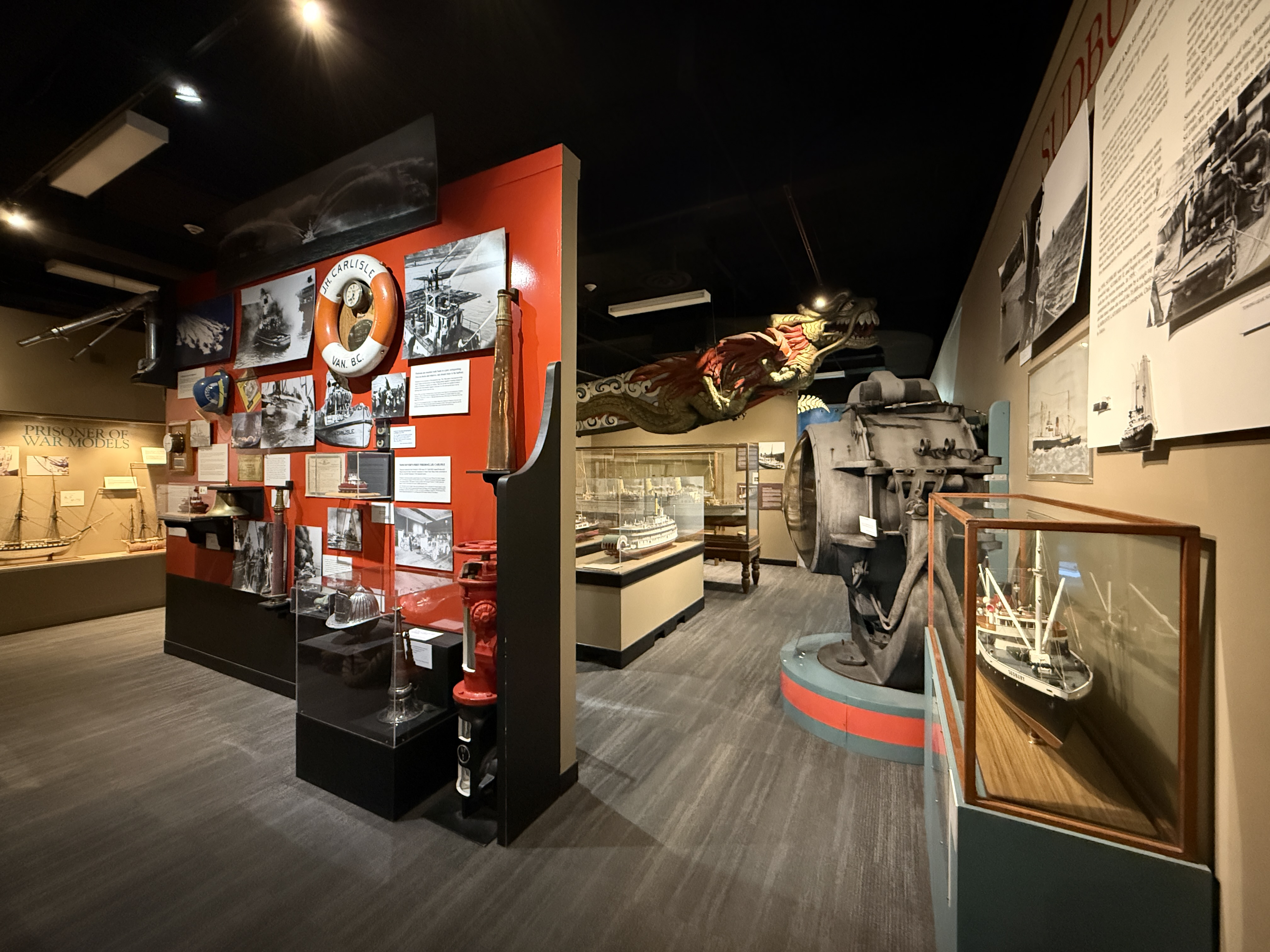
Claridge Gallery

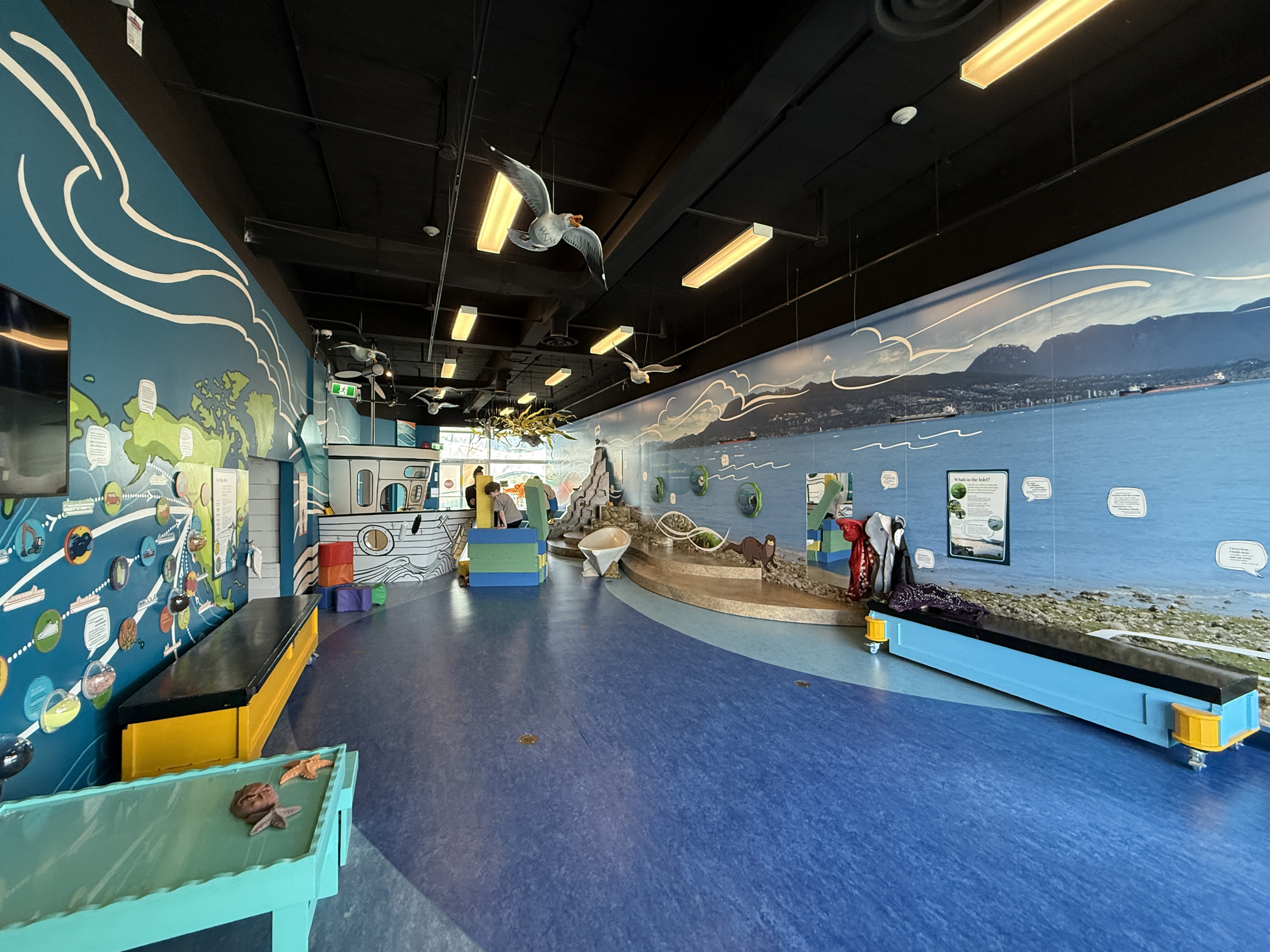
Children Maritime Discovery Centre

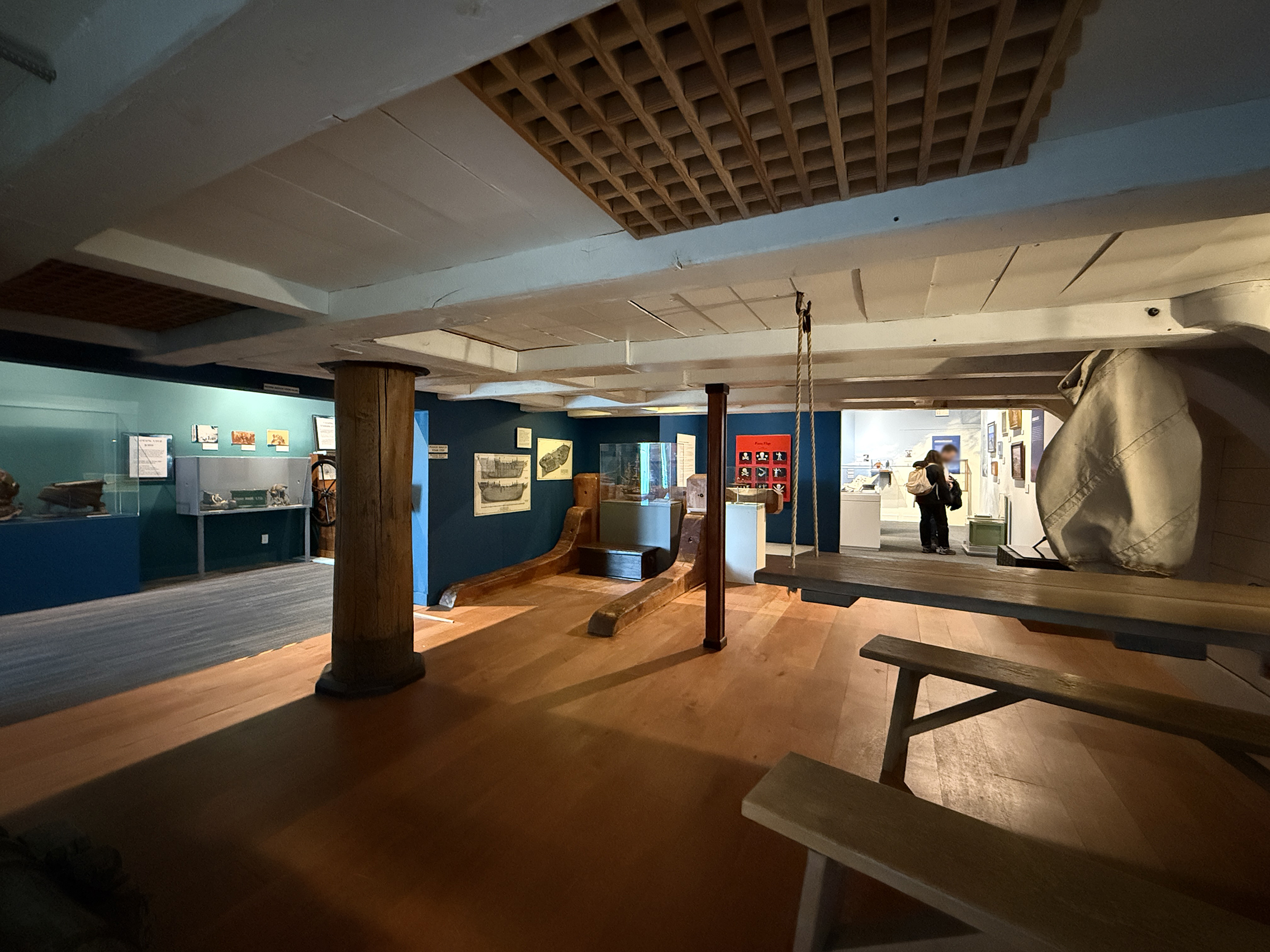
H.M.S. Discovery Gallery

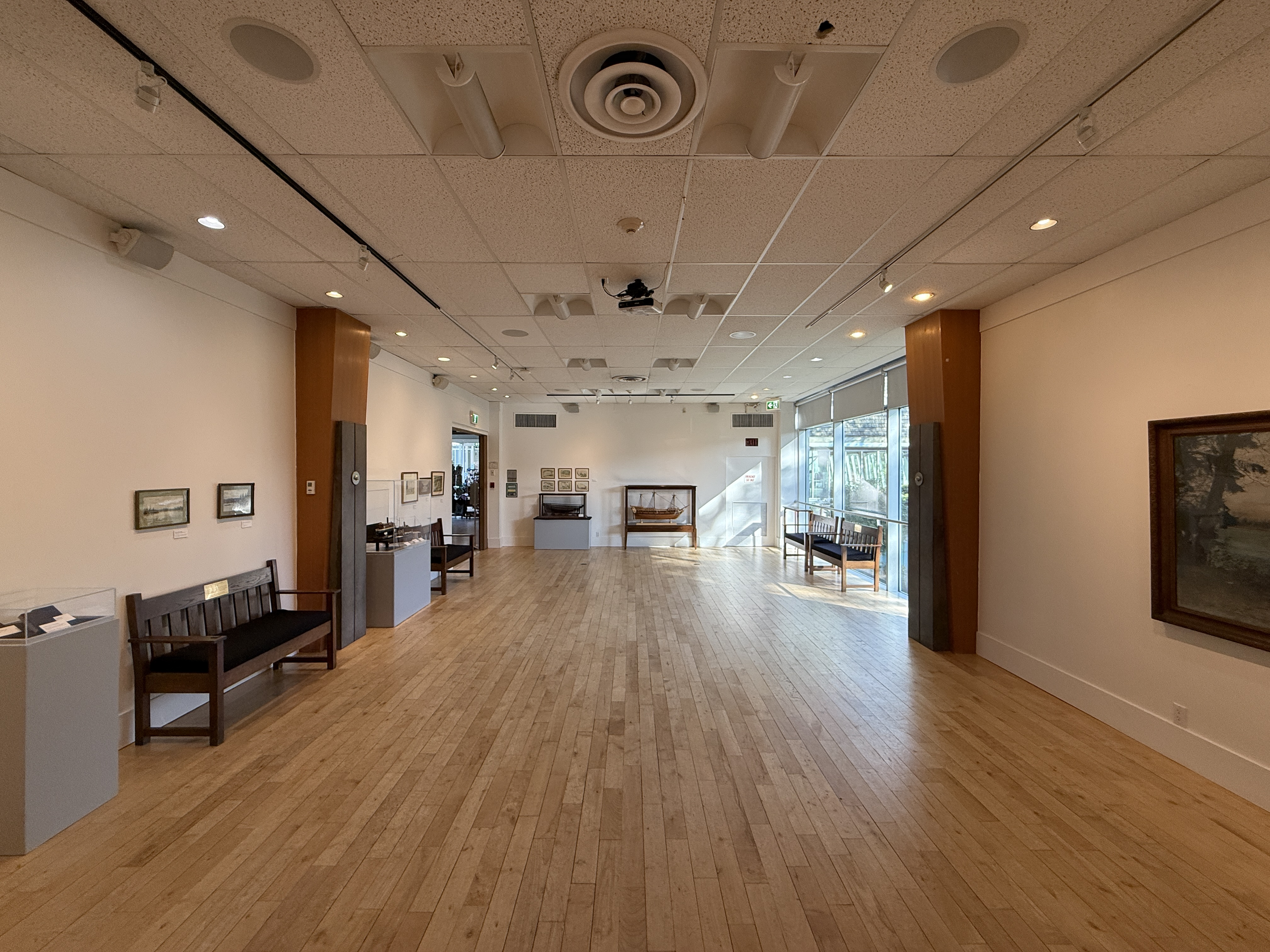
Finning Gallery Lecture Theatre

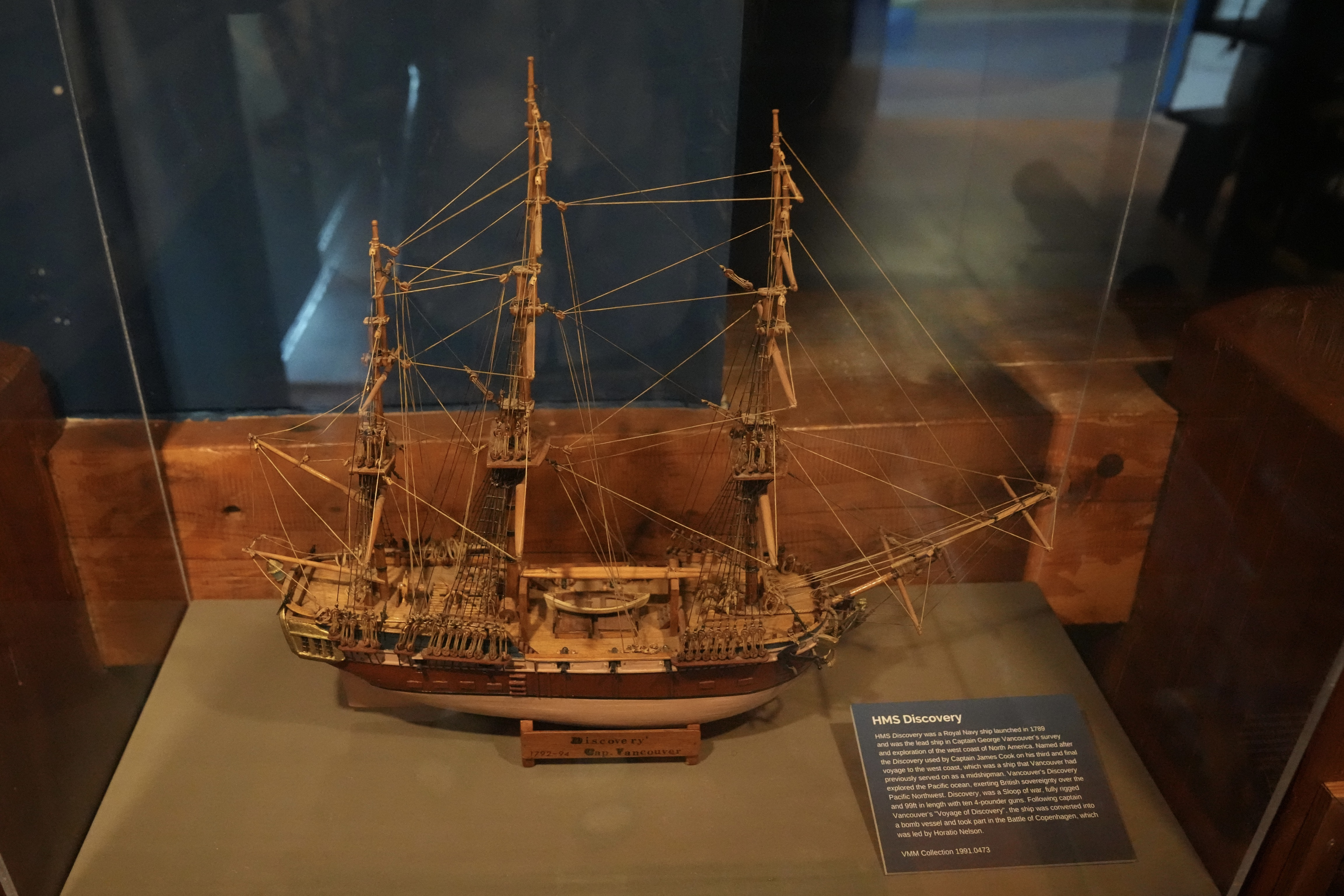
HMS Discovery (1789) Model in the Vancouver Maritime Museum

The main exhibit is the St. Roch, a historic arctic exploration vessel used by the Royal Canadian Mounted Police. The museum also has extensive galleries of model ships, including one with historic model ships built entirely from cardboard or paper as well as a particularly fine bone model of the French warship Vengeur du Peuple which was built around 1800 by French prisoners of war, a Children's Maritime Discovery Centre, a recreation of the forecastle of Vancouver's ship Discovery, an extensive collection of maritime art, and a large library and archives.

Outdoor displays include the NASA undersea research vessel Ben Franklin and the boiler of the Beaver, the first steamship in the Pacific Northwest; it also has a small heritage harbour. There is a workshop where visitors can watch craftsmen build models. Of particular significance is the extensive Chung collection of material relating to Canadian Pacific steamships and original hand-drawn charts from Captain Cook's exploration of the Pacific. This collection is separate from the Wally Chung material housed at the Rare Books and Archives Collection at the University of British Columbia.

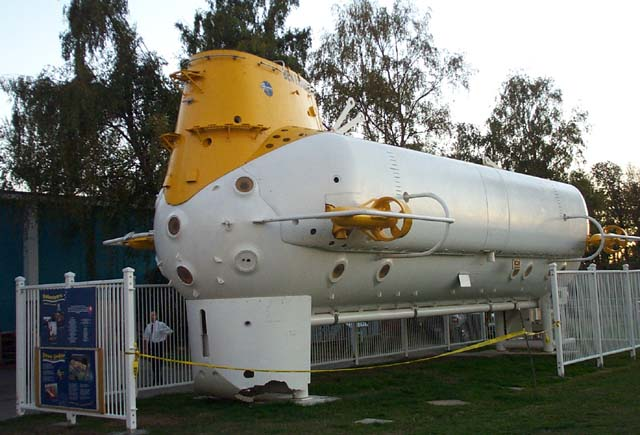
Outdoor exhibits at the museum include Ben Franklin, an undersea research vessel that was used by NASA.

== See also ==
- Maritime Museum of British Columbia
- Museum ship
- List of museum ships
- Ship replica
- Ships preserved in museums
