= Somerset Island (Nunavut) =

Uninhabited island in Nunavut, Canada

Native name: Kuuganajuk
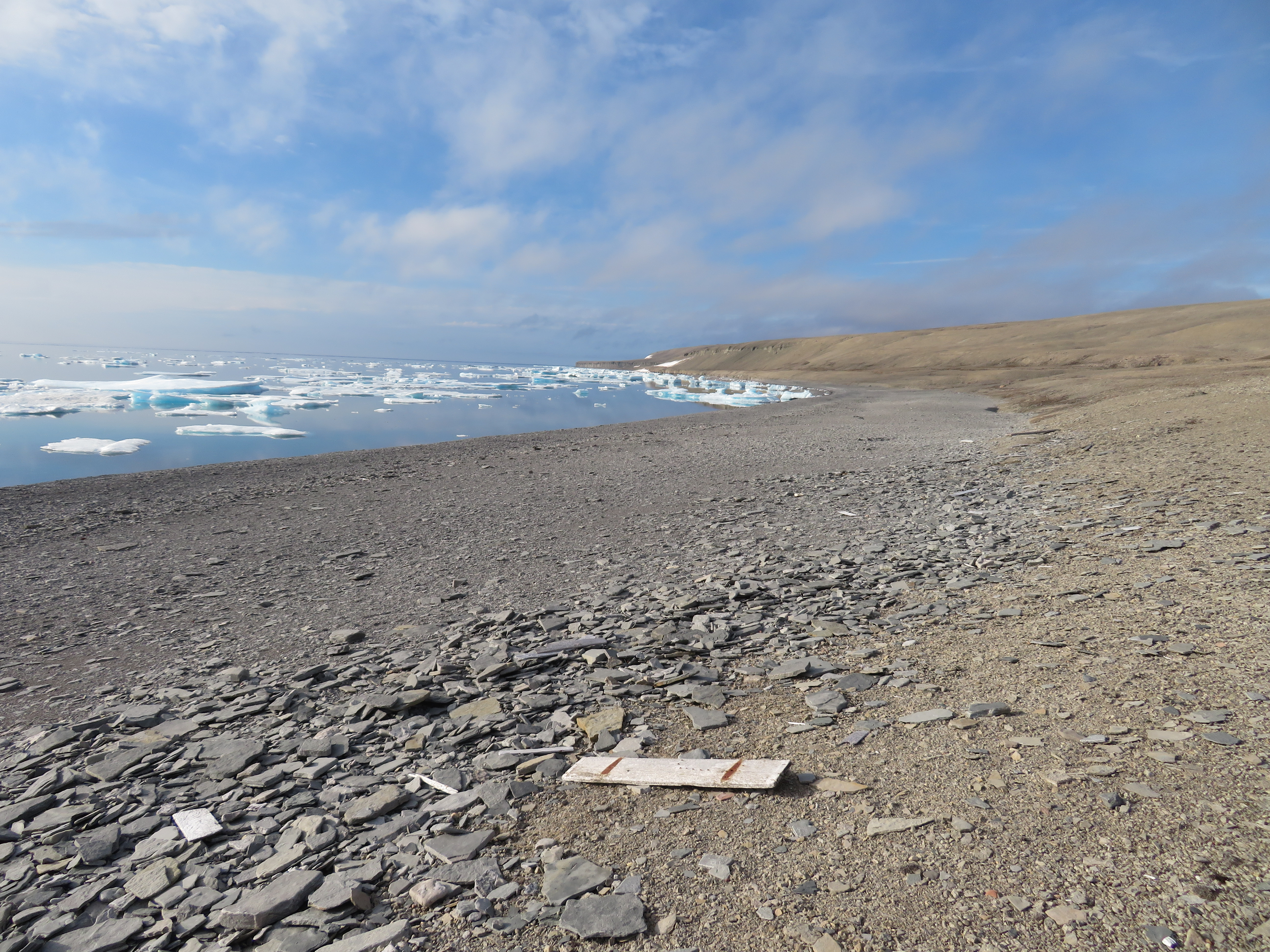
- Fury Beach, on the eastern shore of Somerset Island

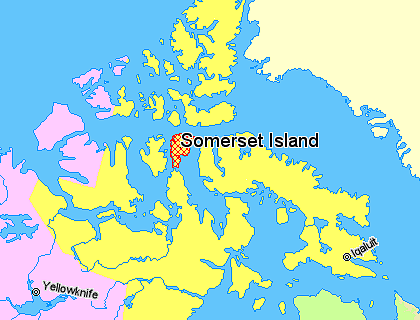
- Somerset Island, Nunavut, Canada

- Location in Nunavut Location in Canada

Geography
- Location: Northern Canada
- Coordinates: 73°15′N 93°30′W
- Archipelago: Arctic Archipelago
- Area: 24,754.51 km^{2} (9,557.77 sq mi) (2026)
- Area rank: 12th in Canada & 46th worldwide
- Highest elevation: 489 m (1604 ft)
- Highest point: Creswell Peak

Administration
- Canada
- Territory: Nunavut
- Regions: Kitikmeot, Qikiqtaaluk

Demographics
- Population: Uninhabited

Somerset Island (Note: Inuktitut: Kuuganajuk) is a large, uninhabited island of the Arctic Archipelago, that is part of the Canadian territory of Nunavut. The island is separated from Cornwallis Island and Devon Island to the north by the Parry Channel, from Baffin Island to the east by Prince Regent Inlet, from the Boothia Peninsula to the south by Bellot Strait, and from Prince of Wales Island to the west by Peel Sound. It has an area of 24,754.51 km^{2} (9,557.77 sq mi), making it the 46th largest island in the world and Canada's twelfth largest island. The majority of the island lies in the Qikiqtaaluk Region and is home to the summer Arctic Watch Lodge. A small southern portion lies in the Kitikmeot Region and is the site of the former Fort Ross trading post.

== History ==
Around 1000 AD, the north coast of Somerset Island was inhabited by the Thule people, as evidenced by whale bones, tunnels and stone ruins. William Edward Parry was the first documented European to sight the island in 1819, naming it North Somerset. HMS Fury was an Arctic exploration ship commanded by Henry Parkyns Hoppner. She was damaged by ice while overwintering and was abandoned on 25 August 1825, at what has since been called Fury Beach on Somerset Island. Her stores were unloaded onto the beach and later came to the rescue of John Ross, who travelled overland to the abandoned cache when he lost his ship further south in the Gulf of Boothia on his 1829 expedition. James Clark Ross was the nephew of John Ross, and accompanied him on the 1829 expedition. In late 1848, James Clark Ross returned to Somerset Island by landing two ships at Port Leopold on the northeast coast to winter. In April the following year, he launched an exploration of the island by sledge. Roald Amundsen transited the passage between the Island and the Prince of Wales Island in the Gjøa in the first successful traverse of the Northwest Passage in 1904. Henry Larsen transited the passage, in the St Roch in the second successful transit in 1943. But he found this route was dangerously icebound, and also too shallow for commercial travel. The Fort Ross trading post was established and run by the Hudson's Bay Company at the southeastern end of the island from 1937 to 1948. When it was closed, the island was left uninhabited except for occasional use of the former store and manager's house as shelters by Inuit caribou hunters from Taloyoak, and a small settlement at Creswell Bay, which after 1967 consisted solely of the family of Timothy Idlout and Naomi Nangat. The Idlout family left Somerset Island in 1991, leaving it completely uninhabited. In 2006, CBC's The National included Fort Ross in a special series focused on climate change.

== Tourism ==
Arctic Watch Lodge, a tourism establishment built in 1992, is located on Somerset Island. Arctic Watch was established at Cunningham Inlet because of the large number of beluga whales that congregate there in the summer. Arctic Watch Lodge is operated by Richard Weber and Josée Auclair. There is a private airstrip at the site, Arctic Watch Lodge Aerodrome.

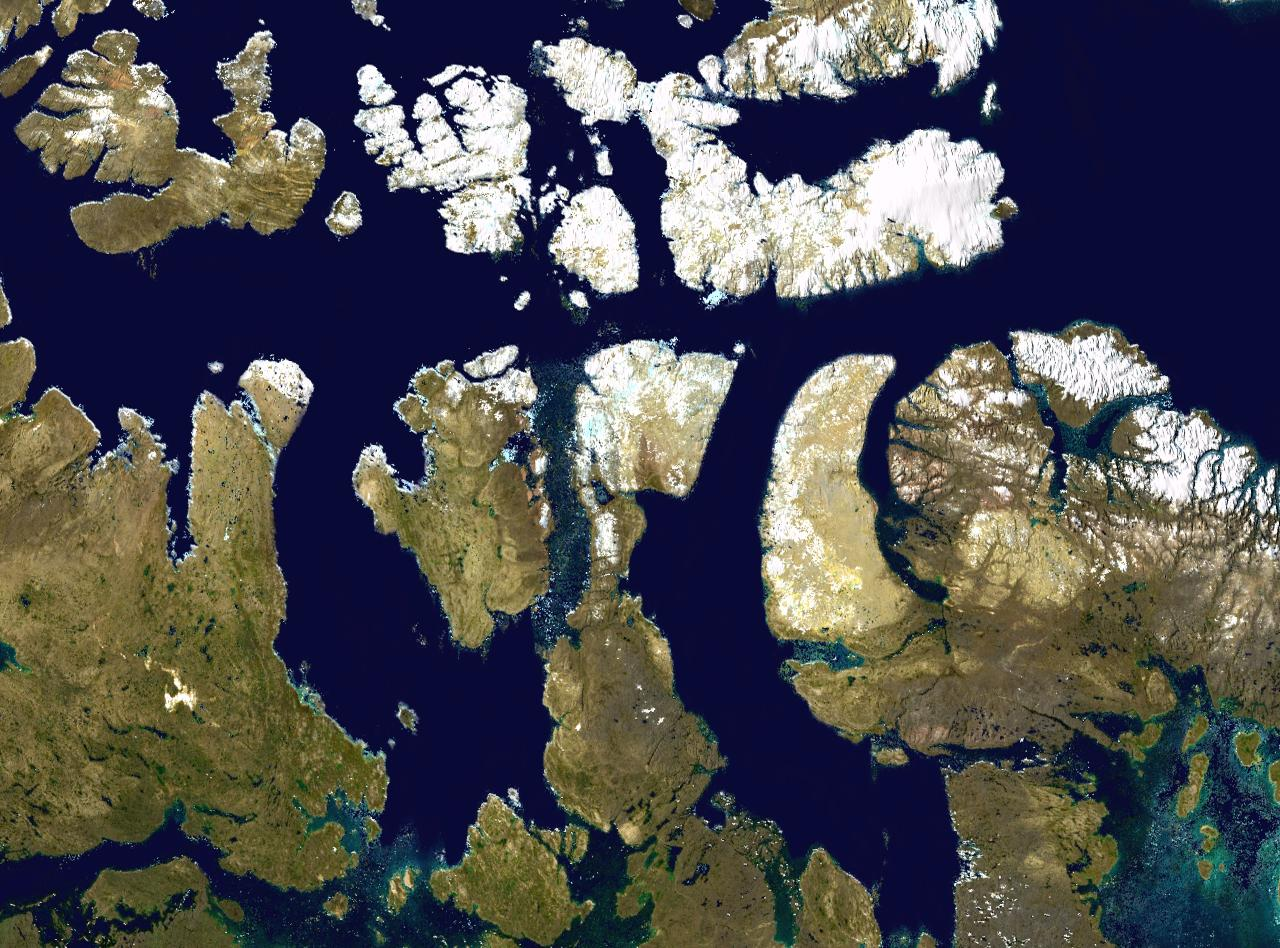
NASA satellite photo montage of Somerset Island and surroundings

== See also ==
- Lists of islands
