= William Kennedy (explorer) =

Canadian explorer (1814 - 1890)

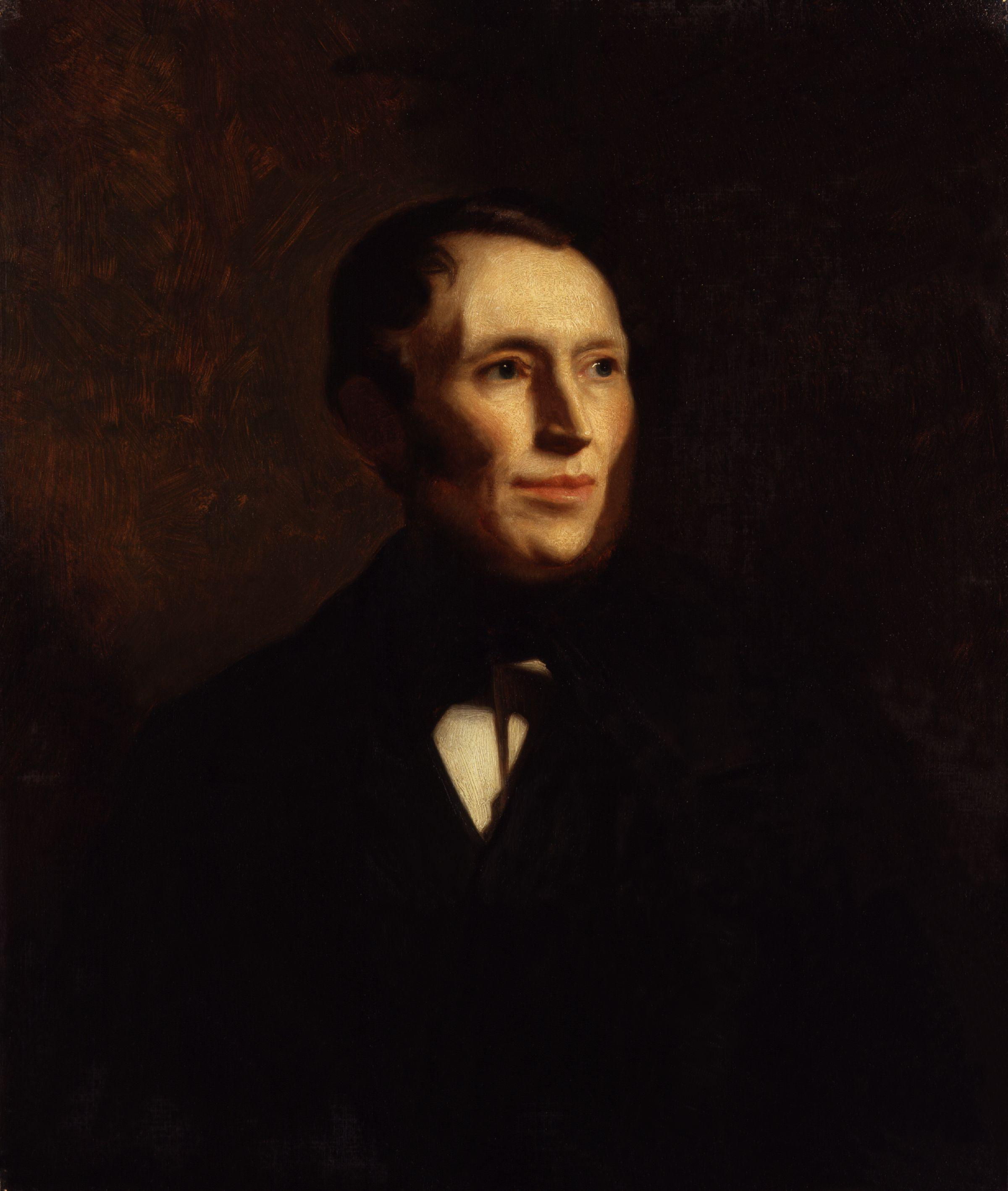
- Born: April 1814; Cumberland House
- Died: 25 January 1890 (aged 75–76); Rural Municipality of St. Andrews
- Occupation: Explorer, fur trader, sailor, magistrate
- Employer: Hudson's Bay Company

William Kennedy (April 1814 – January 25, 1890) was a Canadian fur trader, politician, and historian.

== Early life ==
Kennedy was born at Cumberland House, Saskatchewan in what was then Rupert’s Land, a son of the Hudson's Bay Company Chief Factor, Alexander Kennedy and his English/Cree wife, Aggathas Margaret (Mary) Bear, daughter of Philip Turnor, a cartographer for the HBC. He travelled extensively through the western region, with his family, residing at many Hudson's Bay Company Posts and Forts including Fort Spokane and Fort Astoria while his father was the Chief Factor of the Columbia District. At thirteen, he was sent to his father's birthplace of St. Mary's Hope in the Orkney Islands of Scotland for his education. He returned to Canada after his father's death. Wanting to return to England to become a surgeon like his older brothers, he could not get the sponsorship. Instead, he took employment as a fur-trader with the Hudson's Bay Company HBC).

Kennedy worked at Coulange House as an HBC apprentice clerk in 1834. He married “à la façon du pays” Sarah Stevens (Algonquin) in 1834 and they had two children, William and Anthony. He left his wife and children for a posting to Fort Chimo in Ungava Bay in Quebec, and then served at various posts in northern Quebec and Labrador. He left the HBC in 1846 because he disagreed with the policy of selling liquor to indigenous people.

== Searches for the Franklin expedition ==
Kennedy was commander of Lady Franklin's sponsored expedition in 1851 to find her husband, Sir John Franklin, using the ketch Prince Albert. His second in command was Joseph René Bellot, a French Navy sub-lieutenant. The expedition was well organized as Kennedy was well versed in northern travel, and used as many experienced men as he could find and outfitted them in native clothing. While the expedition did not find Franklin, it did acquire substantial knowledge of the Canadian Arctic. This was because of his preparedness and leadership: adapting the dress and survival techniques of the Inuit peoples, bringing a custom-made kayak for independent travel away from the ship, stopping in Greenland to purchase a dog-sled team, and asking the locals for the best routes and information of the area. They returned to Britain in October 1852 without losing any men, having recorded the flora, fauna, and cartography of the area; a first for any Arctic exploration to that date.

Lady Franklin placed Kennedy in charge of her auxiliary steamship Isabel to search the Arctic via the Bering Strait early in 1853. However, most of the crew including his sailing master Robert Grate mutinied at Valparaíso in August, claiming the vessel was too small for her mission. After two years trading around the South American coast while trying to find another crew willing to sail to the Arctic, he gave up and returned the Isabel to England in 1855.

After returning to England Captain Kennedy wrote a book about his expedition, earning further acclaim and public recognition. The British Historical Society invited him to present his drawings and findings to its members. Upon his return to Canada in 1856, he became active in establishing a mail service between Toronto and the Red River Colony.

== Legal challenge to Hudson's Bay Company ==
Before and after the Lady Franklin expedition Kennedy wrote several open letters to the Globe newspaper, which were printed, and received a great deal of attention. These letters questioned the leaders of Upper and Lower Canada for enabling the Hudson's Bay Company (HBC) to govern Rupert's Land when they didn't have the legal authority.

Captain Kennedy collaborated with his nephew, Alexander Kennedy Isbister, a surgeon and barrister in the British parliament, also a former HBC employee, Métis, and staunch critic of the company. Utilizing his access he was able to directly reference the original company documents in the Parliament's archives. He determined that the agreement between the Magistrate and HBC granting authority to govern had expired decades earlier. The HBC's authority to govern continued solely because it had been uncontested. Kennedy challenged the governing authority of the HBC in the public arena of Canada's media. Isbister challenged it in the British Parliament. Isbister hand-delivered petitions from the residents of Rupert's Land and represented their requests to self-govern, twice, on the floor of the British Parliament.

Both Kennedy and Isbister risked their reputations, personal safety, social position, and utilized their personal funds, to bring this information to the attention of the people. After a decade of petitioning, campaigning, and soliciting the British upper class for support, the Parliament relented. Choosing to restructure instead of granting self-government, they united the regions of Upper and Lower Canada with Rupert's Land into the country of Canada. To this day, the second petition presented by Isbister resides in the National Gallery.

== Later life and death ==
By 1860, Captain Kennedy settled at his family home in the Red River Settlement with his wife, Eleanor Cripps (a friend of Lady Franklin). During this period he operated a store with his brother George, eventually becoming active in the community as a magistrate, and member of the Board of Education of Manitoba. He was invited to present his Arctic findings at the first scientific address of the newly formed Historical and Scientific Society of Manitoba, 1879.

During the 1860s, Kennedy rebuilt his family home at Red River in the river-stone style, naming it The Maples.

Kennedy, a supporter of the Canada party, did not participate during the 1869–70 Red River Rebellion because he was bed-ridden and crippled with arthritis.

By the 1880s, his niece's husband, John Norquay the Premier of Manitoba, recruited Captain Kennedy to be an active voice for the development of a railway from Winnipeg to Churchill. This was an important line in the quest to break the Canadian Pacific Railway's supply-chain monopoly over the region. He died before the line could be completed.

== Legacy ==
During the 1910s, the Women's Canadian Club hosted a ceremony recognizing Captain Kennedy with a placard mounted at St. Andrews church. The inscription reads, "To William Kennedy, Arctic Explorer, by Sir Ernest Shackleton, the famous Antarctic explorer."

Kennedy's home still exists as the Captain William Kennedy House at St. Andrews, which highlights the unique architecture from this era, and showcases his belongings from his period.

== See also ==
- Notable Aboriginal people of Canada
- Captain William Kennedy House
