= Sea devil =

Sea devil or Sea Devil may refer to:

== Biology ==
- Mobulidae, the devil rays, including:
  - Manta rays such as Mobula birostris
  - The devil fish Mobula mobular
- Lophiiformes, anglerfish, including:
  - The family Ceratiidae, "warty seadevils"
  - The family Melanocetidae, "black seadevil"
  - Members of the genus Lophius

== Marine vessels ==
- USS Sea Devil, the name of more than one United States Navy ship
- HMS Sea Devil (P244), a British submarine launched in 1945
- USCGC Sea Devil (WPB-87368), a Marine Protector-class U.S. Coast Guard Cutter launched in 2007
- Seeteufel, a German amphibious submarine
- Seeteufel (1856), a Russian prototype submarine

== Fiction ==
- Sea Devil (Doctor Who), a fictional monster in the Doctor Who television series
- The Sea Devils, a story in the above series
- The Sea Devils (Dungeons & Dragons), a sourcebook detailing the fictional aquatic race of the sahuagin for the game
- Sea Devils (comics), a team of characters in the DC comics universe; as well as the title of the comic starring them
- Sea Devils (1931 film), a 1931 film directed by Joseph Levering
- Sea Devils (1937 film), a 1937 American film directed by Benjamin Stoloff
- Sea Devils (1953 film), a 1953 film starring Rock Hudson
- A group of "sea devils" appear in L. Frank Baum's novel The Sea Fairies

== Other ==
- The athletic teams of Cape Fear Community College in Wilmington, North Carolina
- Devil's Sea, an area of water south of Japan
- Sea Devils, an autobiographical memoir by Junio Valerio Borghese detailing his naval exploits

== See also ==
- Hamburg Sea Devils (disambiguation)
- Sea wolf (disambiguation)
- Devilfish (disambiguation)
