= James Clark Ross =

Royal Navy officer and explorer (1800–1862)

Rear-Admiral Sir James Clark Ross FRS FLS FRAS
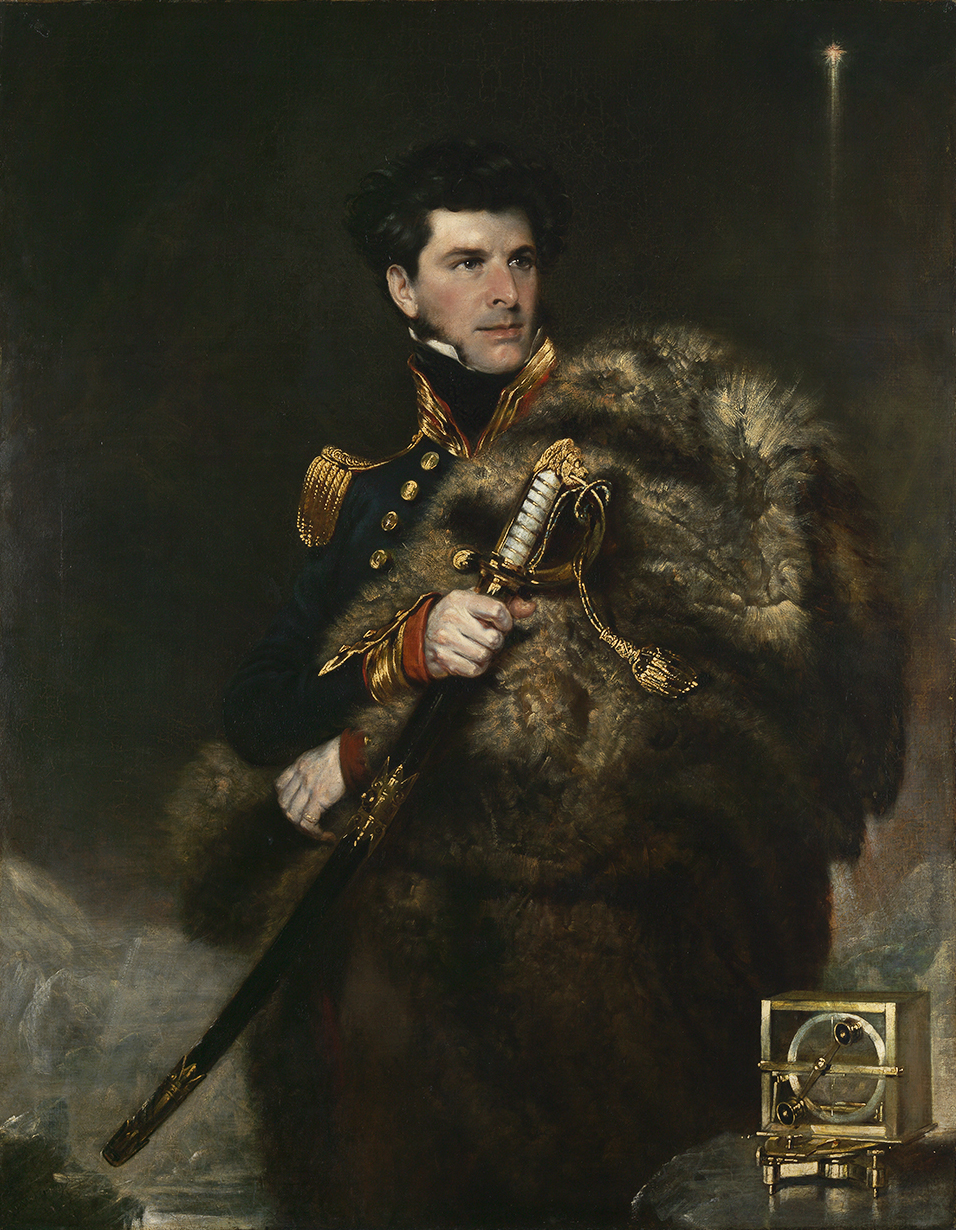
- Commander James Clark Ross, R.N., Discoverer of the North Pole by J R Wildman, 1834
- Born: James Clark Ross; 15 April 1800; Finsbury Square, London
- Died: 3 April 1862 (aged 61); Aston Abbotts, Buckinghamshire
- Burial place: St James the Great, Aston Abbotts
- Spouse: Ann Coulman (m. 1843; died 1857)
- Relatives: Sir John Ross (uncle)
- Military career
- Allegiance: United Kingdom
- Branch: Royal Navy
- Service years: 1812–1862
- Rank: Rear-Admiral of the Red
- Expeditions: Ross expedition (1839–1843)
- Awards: Royal Geographical Society's Founder's Medal (1842); Grande Médaille d'Or des Explorations (1843)

Rear-Admiral of the Red Sir James Clark Ross FRS FLS FRAS (15 April 1800 – 3 April 1862) was a British naval officer and explorer who explored both the North and South Poles. In the Arctic, he participated in two expeditions led by his uncle, John Ross, and in four led by William Edward Parry; in the Antarctic, he led his own expedition from 1839 to 1843.

== Biography ==
=== Early life ===
Ross was born in London, the son of George Ross and nephew of John Ross, under whom the eleven-year-old entered the Royal Navy on 5 April 1812. Ross was an active participant in the Napoleonic Wars, being present at an action where HMS Briseis, commanded by his uncle, captured Le Petit Poucet (a French privateer) on 9 October 1812. Ross then served successively with his uncle on HMS Actaeon and HMS Driver.

=== Arctic exploration ===
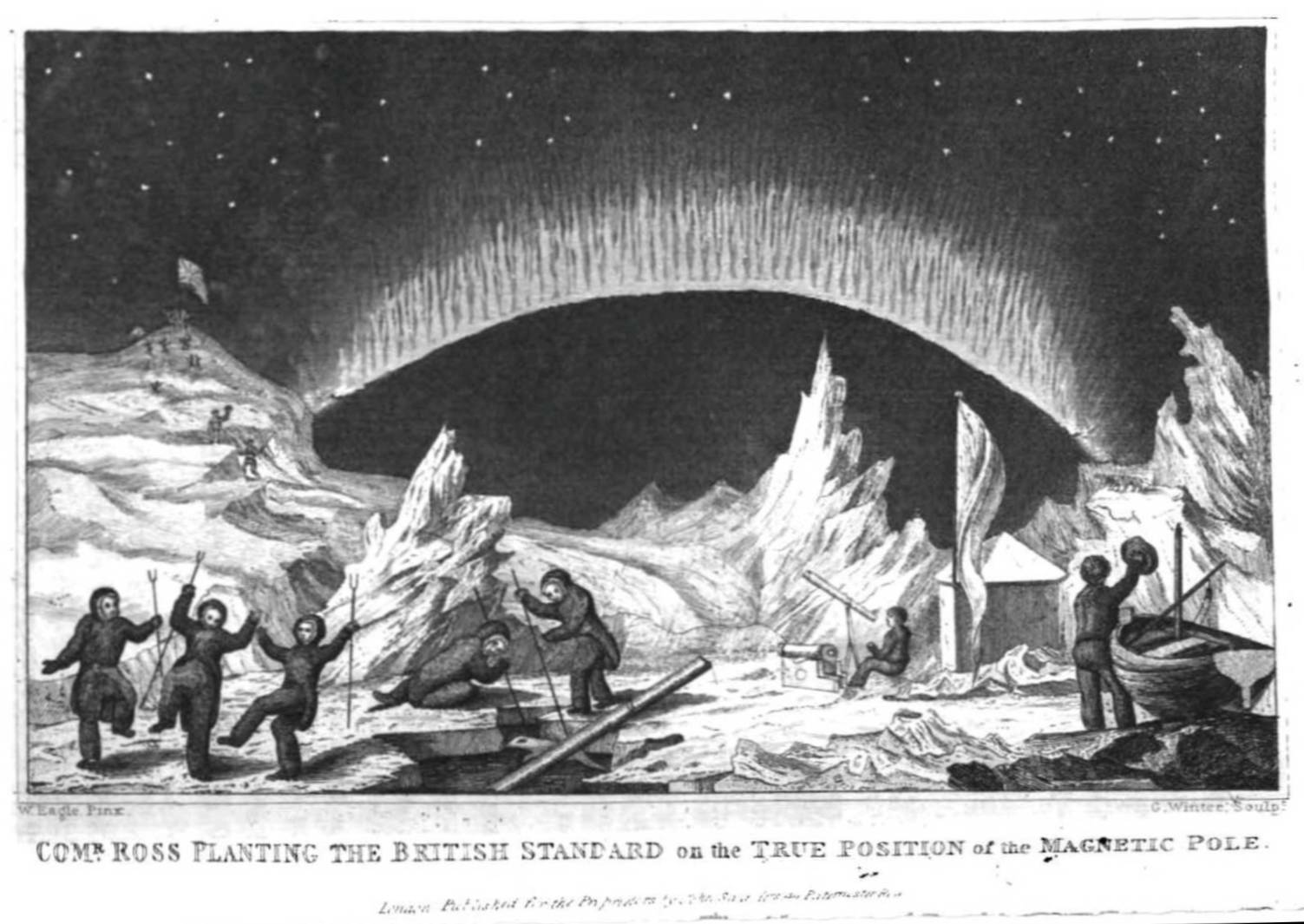
Illustration of the discovery of the North Magnetic Pole on the Boothia Peninsula in 1831, from Robert Huish's 1835 book

Ross participated in John's unsuccessful first Arctic voyage in search of a Northwest Passage in 1818 aboard Isabella. Between 1819 and 1827 Ross took part in four Arctic expeditions under William Edward Parry, taking particular interest in magnetism and natural history. This was also where he served as midshipman with Francis Crozier, who would later become his close friend and second-in-command. From 1829 to 1833 Ross again served under his uncle on John's second Arctic voyage. It was during this trip that a small party led by James Ross (including Thomas Abernethy) located the position of the north magnetic pole on 1 June 1831, on the Boothia Peninsula in the far north of Canada, and James Ross personally planted the British flag at the pole. It was on this trip, too, that Ross charted the Beaufort Islands, later renamed Clarence Islands by his uncle. Ross then served as supernumerary-commander of HMS Victory in Portsmouth for 12 months.

On 28 October 1834 Ross was promoted to captain. In December 1835 he offered his services to the Admiralty to resupply 11 whaling ships which had become trapped in Baffin Bay. They accepted his offer, and he set sail in HMS Cove in January 1836. The crossing was difficult, and by the time he had reached the last known position of the whalers in June, all but one had managed to return home. Ross found no trace of this last vessel, William Torr, which was probably crushed in the ice in December 1835. He returned to Hull in September 1836 with all his crew in good health.

=== British Magnetic Survey ===
From 1835 to 1839, except for his voyage with Cove, he was one of the principal participants in the British Magnetic Survey, a magnetic survey of Great Britain, with Edward Sabine, John Phillips and Humphrey Lloyd. This also included some work on geomagnetic measurements in Ireland in 1834–1835, working with Sabine and Lloyd. In 1837, Ross assisted in T. C. Robinson's improvement of the dip circle during the survey; anomalous results had been discovered by Ross in 1835 in Westbourne Green. In 1838, Ross completed magnetic observations at 12 different stations throughout Ireland. The survey was completed in 1838; some supplementary measurements by Robert Were Fox were also used.

=== Antarctic exploration ===
Map of Ross's 1839-43 Antarctic expedition

On 8 April 1839, Ross was given orders to command an expedition to Antarctica for the purposes of 'magnetic research and geographical discovery'. Between September 1839 and September 1843, Ross commanded HMS Erebus on his own Antarctic expedition and charted much of the continent's coastline. Captain Francis Crozier was second-in-command of the expedition, commanding HMS Terror, with senior lieutenant Archibald McMurdo. Support for the expedition had been arranged by Francis Beaufort, hydrographer of the Navy and a member of several scientific societies. On the expedition was gunner Thomas Abernethy and ship's surgeon Robert McCormick, as well as Joseph Dalton Hooker, who had been invited along as assistant ship's surgeon. Erebus and Terror were bomb vessels—an unusual type of warship named after the mortar bombs they were designed to fire and constructed with extremely strong hulls, to withstand the recoil of the heavy weapons. The ships were selected for the Antarctic mission as being able to resist thick ice, as proved true in practice.

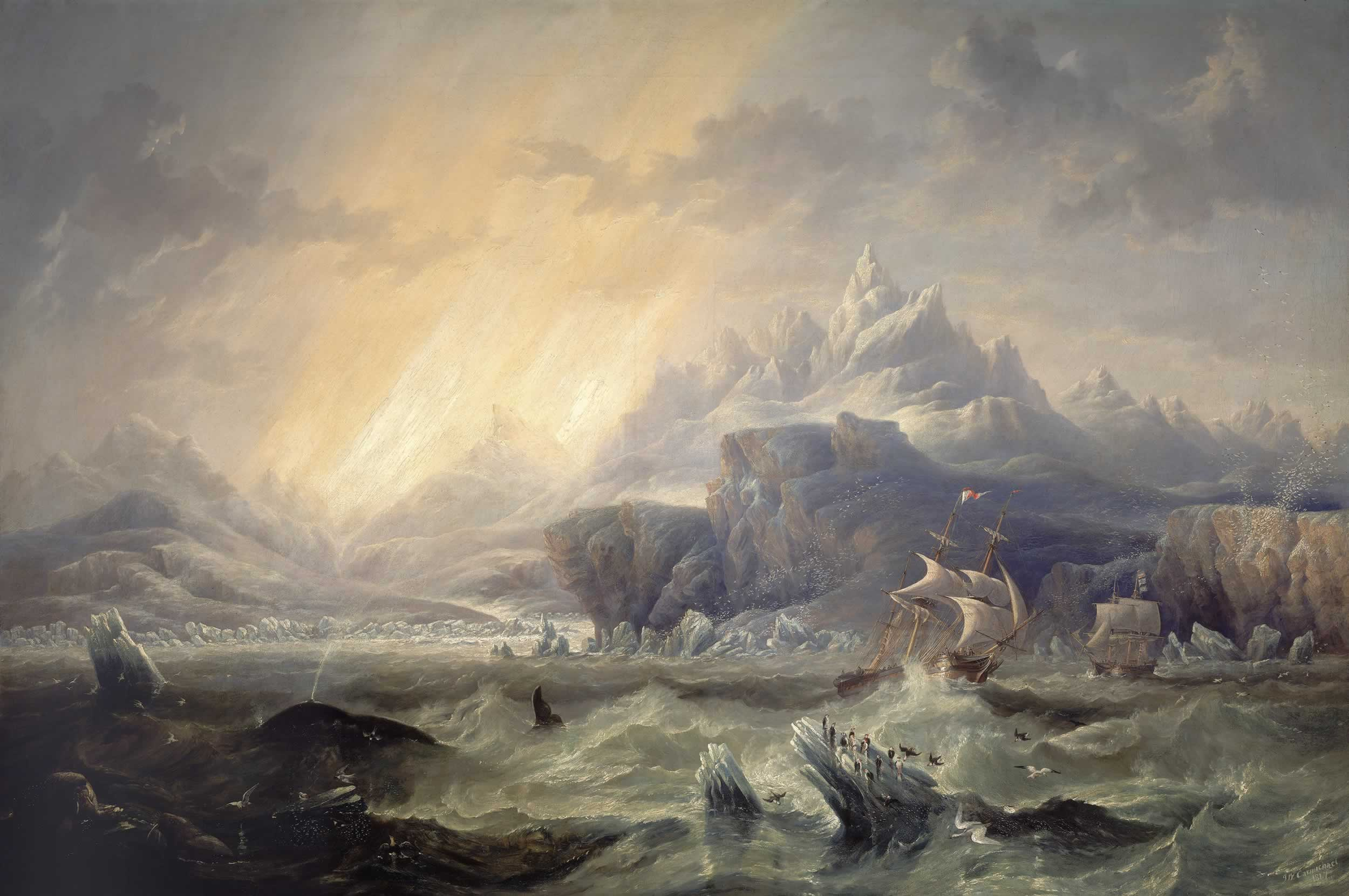
Ross expedition in the Antarctic, 1847, by John Carmichael

En route to the Southern Ocean, Ross established magnetic measurement stations in Saint Helena, Cape Town, and Kerguelen before arriving in Hobart in early 1840 and establishing a further permanent station with the help of governor John Franklin before waiting for summer.

Ross crossed the Antarctic Circle on 1 January 1841. Shortly after, he discovered the Ross Sea and Victoria Land, charting 900 km (560 mi) of new coastline, reaching Possession Island on 12 January and Franklin Island on 27 January (which Ross named after John Franklin). He then reached Ross Island, later named after him by Robert F. Scott, with the volcanoes Mount Erebus and Mount Terror, which were named for the expedition's vessels. They sailed for 250 nautical miles (460 km) along the edge of the low, flat-topped ice shelf they called variously the Barrier or the Great Ice Barrier, later named the Ross Ice Shelf in his honour.

After being forced to overwinter in Tasmania, Ross returned to the Ross Sea in December 1841 before travelling east past Marie Byrd Land to the Antarctic Peninsula. The next winter, the expedition overwintered in the Falkland Islands before returning to survey the Antarctic Peninsula over the summer of 1842–1843.

Ross attempted to penetrate south at about 55° W, and explored the eastern side of what is now known as James Ross Island, discovering and naming Snow Hill Island and Seymour Island. Ross reported that Admiralty Sound appeared to him to have been blocked by glaciers at its southern end.

The expedition's main aim was to find the position of the south magnetic pole. While Ross failed to reach the pole, he was able to determine its location. The expedition also produced the first accurate magnetic maps of the Antarctic.

Ross's ships arrived back in England on 4 September 1843. He was awarded the Grande Médaille d'Or des Explorations in 1843, knighted in 1844, and elected to the Royal Society in 1848.

=== Search for Franklin's lost expedition ===
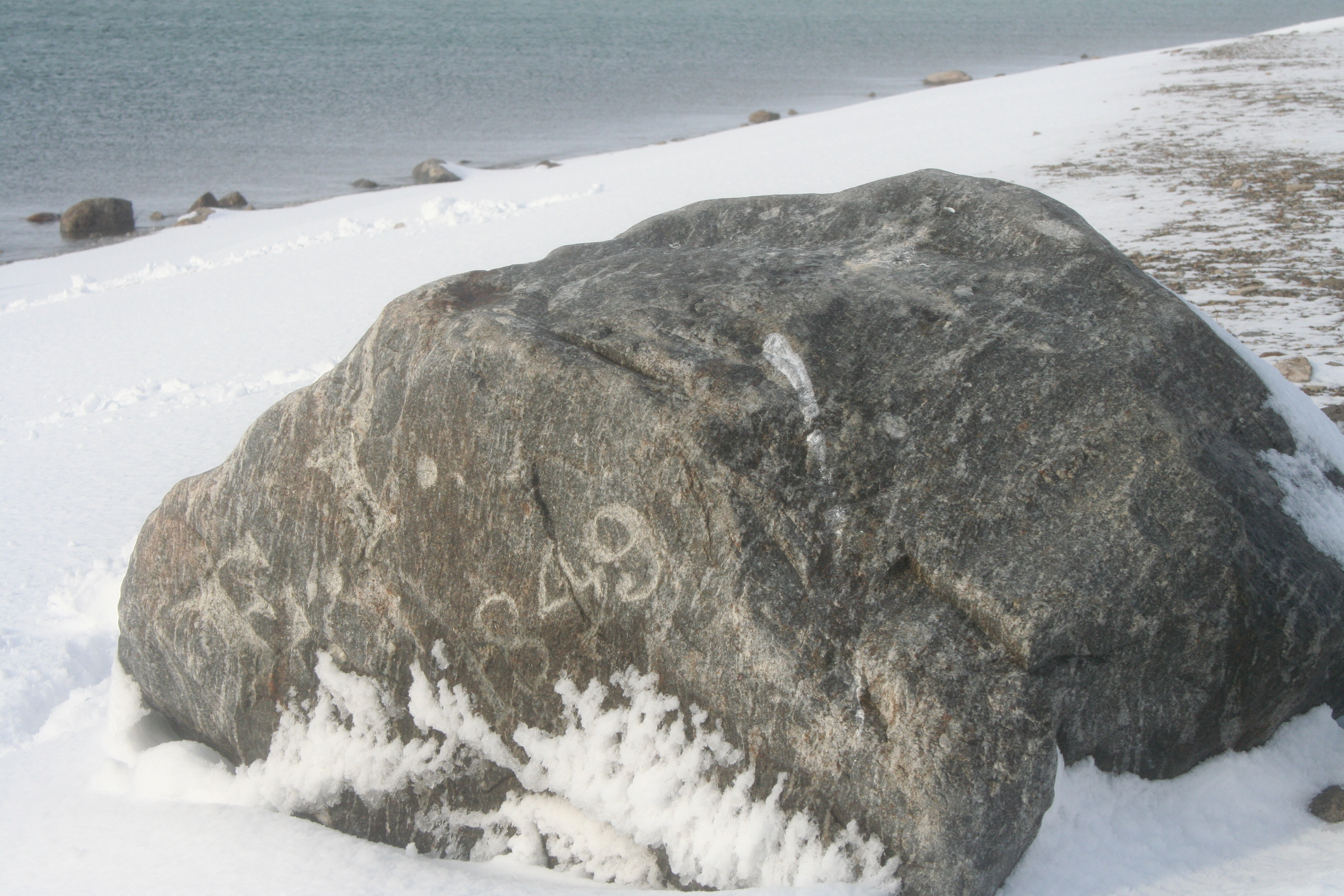
"E.I. 1849": Enterprise and Investigator, inscribed by a crew member of the Ross expedition on Somerset Island in Nunavut, Canada

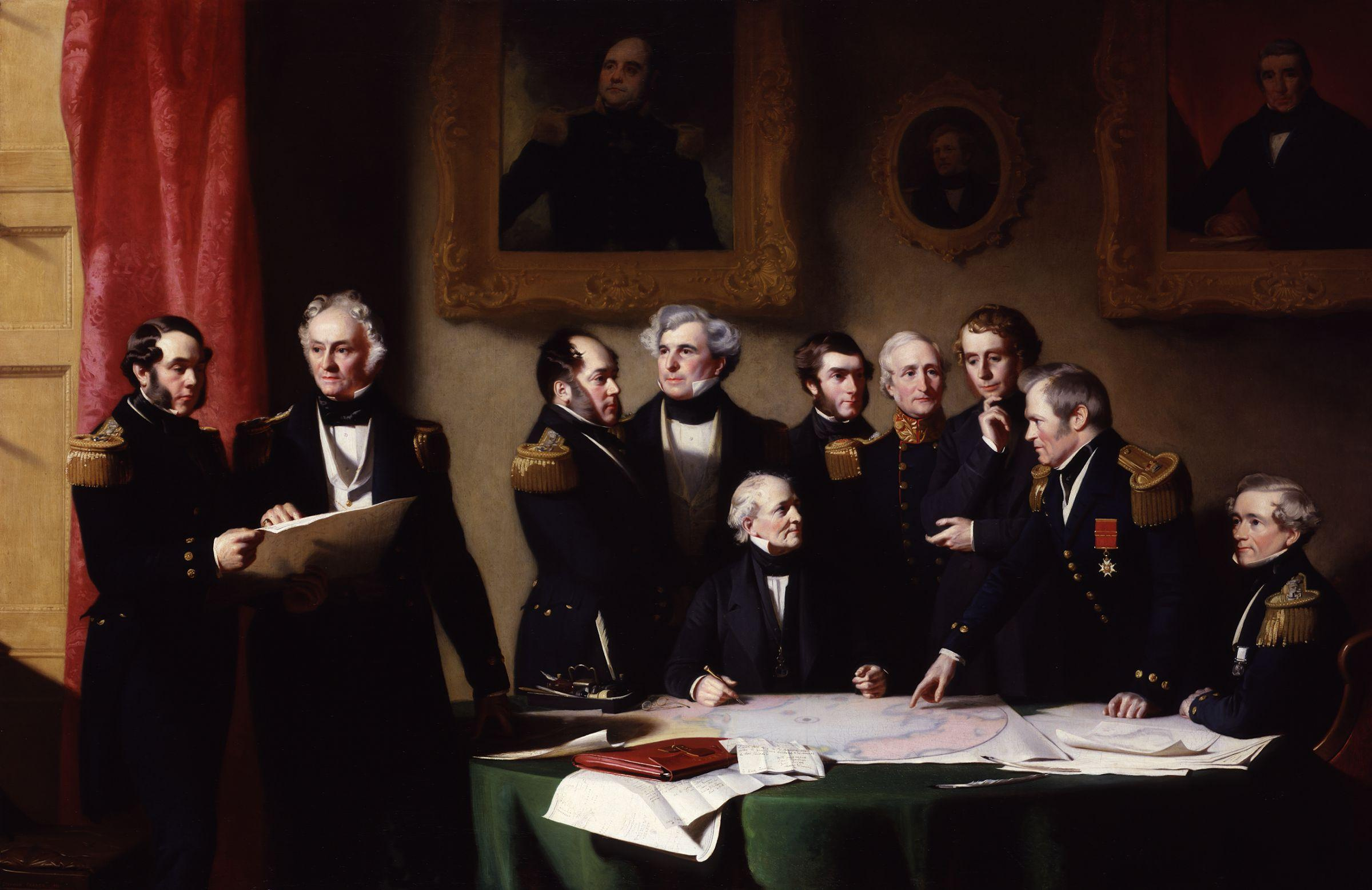
The Arctic Council Planning a Search for Sir John Franklin by Stephen Pearce, 1851

On 31 January 1848, Ross was sent on one of three expeditions to find John Franklin. Franklin's second in command was Ross's close friend Francis Crozier. The other expeditions sent to find Franklin were the Rae–Richardson Arctic expedition and the expedition aboard HMS Plover and HMS Herald through the Bering Strait. He was given command of HMS Enterprise, accompanied by HMS Investigator. Because of heavy ice in Baffin Bay he only reached the northeast tip of Somerset Island where he was frozen in at Port Leopold. In the spring, he and Leopold McClintock explored the west coast of the island by sledge. He recognized Peel Sound but thought it too ice-choked for Franklin to have used it. In fact, Franklin had used it in 1846 when the extent of sea ice had been atypically low. The next summer he tried to reach Wellington Channel but was blocked by ice and returned to England. Ultimately every member of Franklin's expedition perished.

=== Personal life ===
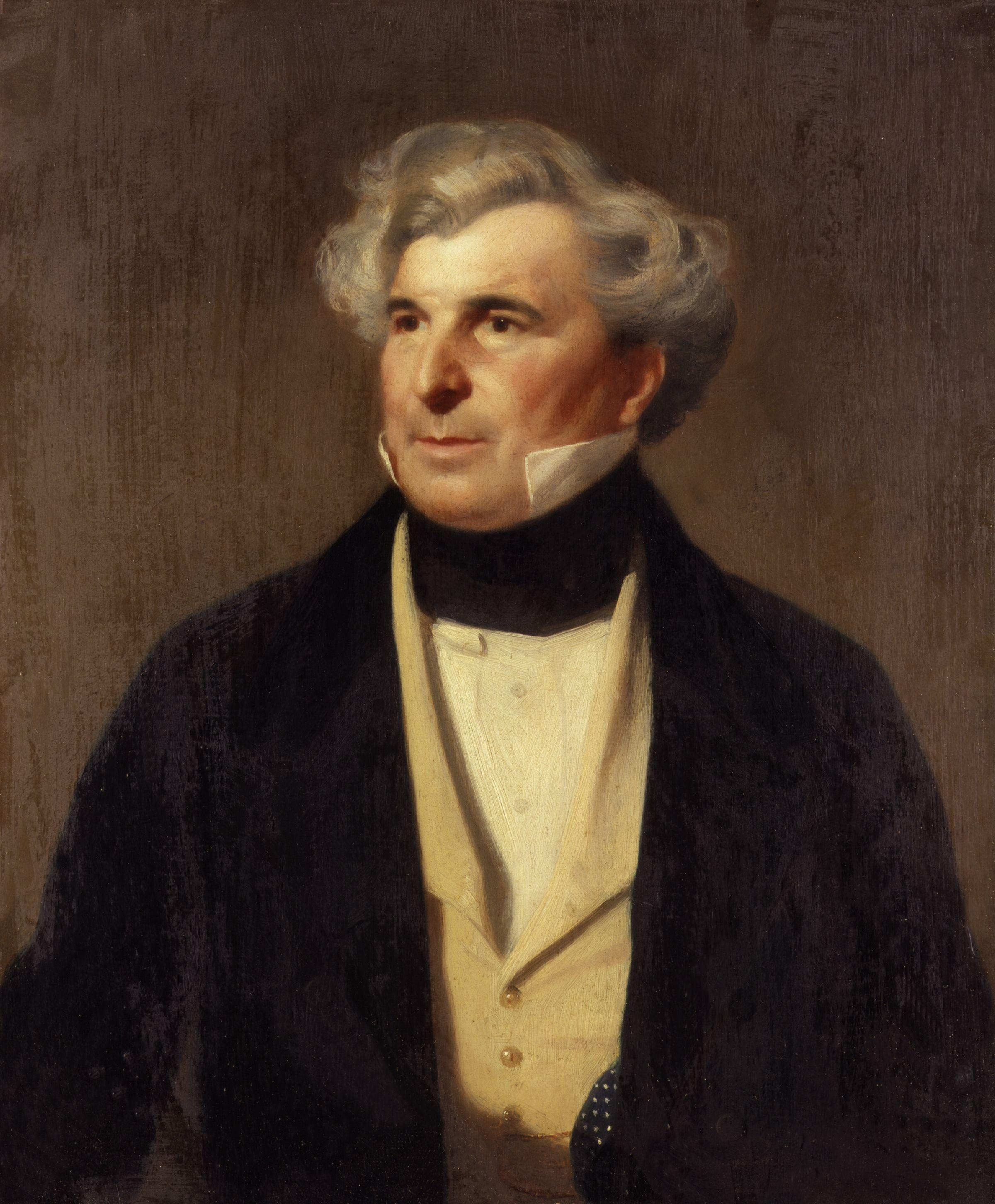
James Clark Ross, depicted in 1850 by Stephen Pearce

Ross married Ann Coulman in 1843. They had four children: James, Anne, Thomas and Andrew. A blue plaque marks Ross's home in Eliot Place, Blackheath, London. His closest friend was Francis Crozier, with whom he sailed many times.

He also lived in the ancient House of the Abbots of St. Albans in Buckinghamshire. In the gardens of the Abbey there is a lake with two islands, named after the ships Terror and Erebus.

Ross remained an officer in the Royal Navy for the rest of his life and was subsequently promoted several times, his final rank being Rear-Admiral of the Red awarded in August 1861.

Ross died at Aston Abbotts on 3 April 1862, five years after his wife. They are buried together in the parish churchyard of St. James the Great.

=== In fiction ===
Ross, played by British actor Richard Sutton, is a secondary character in the 2018 AMC television series The Terror, portrayed in a fictionalised version of his 1848 search for Franklin's lost expedition, as well as in the 2007 Dan Simmons novel on which the series is based. Ross is also mentioned continually by Jules Verne in his novel The Adventures of Captain Hatteras (for example, chapter XXV is entitled 'One of James Ross's foxes').

== Tributes ==
- The James Ross Strait, Ross Bay, Ross Point, and Rossøya in the Arctic are all named after him
- RRS James Clark Ross, former name of Noosfera, a National Antarctic Scientific Center of Ukraine research ship.
- The crater Ross on the Moon is named after him
- Ross Dependency, Ross Island, Ross Ice Shelf and Ross Sea in the Antarctic are all named after him
- Mont Ross, the highest mountain, at a height of 6,070 feet (1,850 m), in the Kerguelen Islands, is named after Ross.

== Taxon named in his honor ==
- Ross's gull, a small gull, the only species in its genus, that breeds in the high arctic of northernmost North America and northeast Siberia
- The Ross seal, Ommatophoca rossii, one of the four Antarctic phocids, first described during the Ross expedition
- Melanocetus rossi is a species of black seadevil, a type of anglerfish. The fish is mesopelagic; the only example collected by humans was found in the Ross Sea at a depth of 390 metres (1,280 ft).

== See also ==
- European and American voyages of scientific exploration
- Port-Christmas
