= Franklin Island southwest Important Bird Area =

Important Bird Area of Antarctica

Coordinates: 76°06′17″S 168°16′53″E

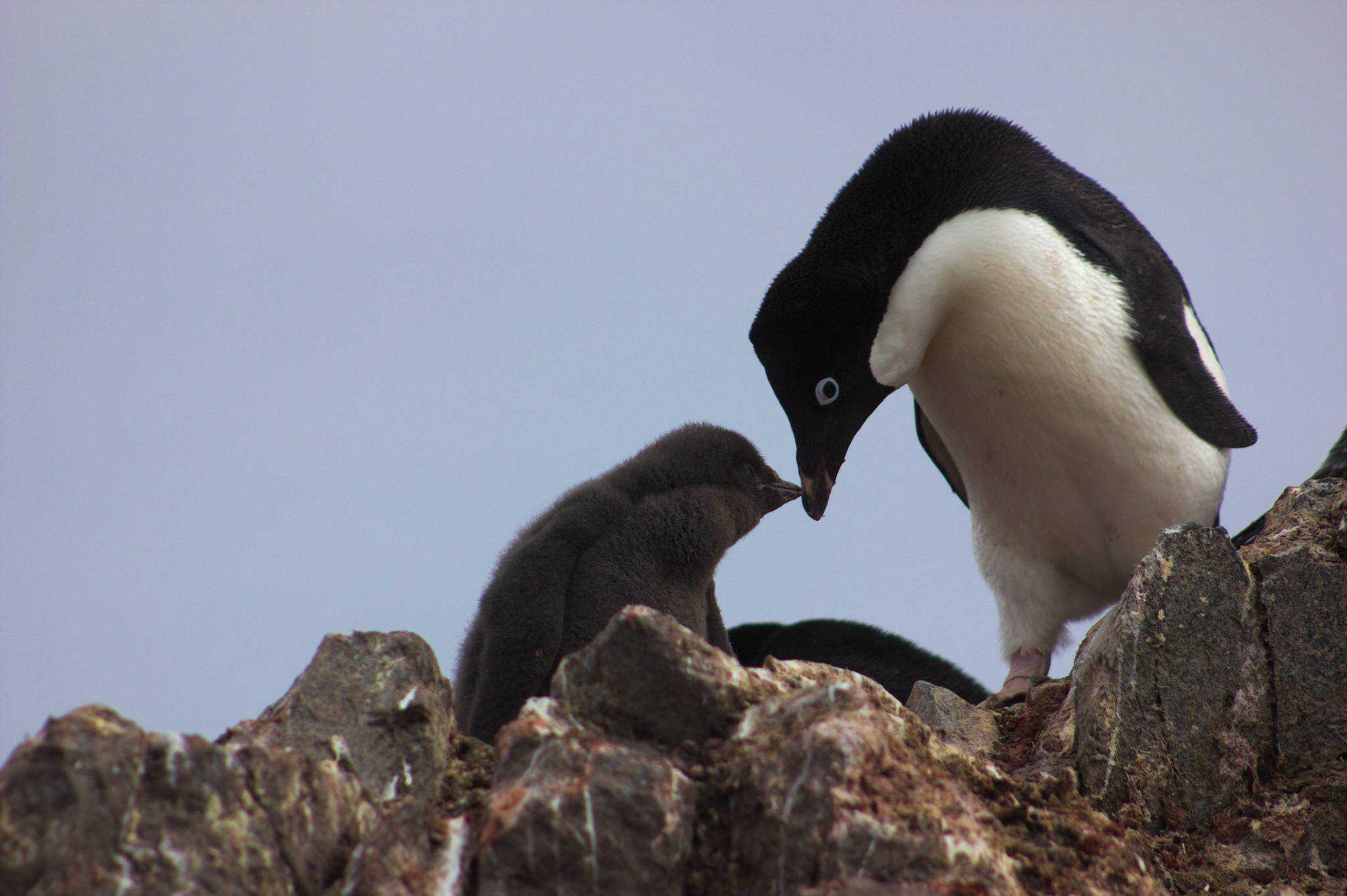
Large numbers of Adélie penguins breed in the IBA

The Franklin Island southwest Important Bird Area is a 129 ha site on a flat point on the south-western coast of Franklin Island, in the southern Ross Sea, Antarctica. It has been designated an Important Bird Area (IBA) by BirdLife International because it supports important seabird colonies, including about 60,000 breeding pairs of Adélie penguins and a presumably associated nearby colony of south polar skuas. The nearest permanent research stations are New Zealand's Scott Base and the USA's McMurdo Station, some 200 km to the south-west on Ross Island.
