= Aston Abbotts =

Village in Buckinghamshire, England

Coordinates: 51.8729°N 0.7702°W

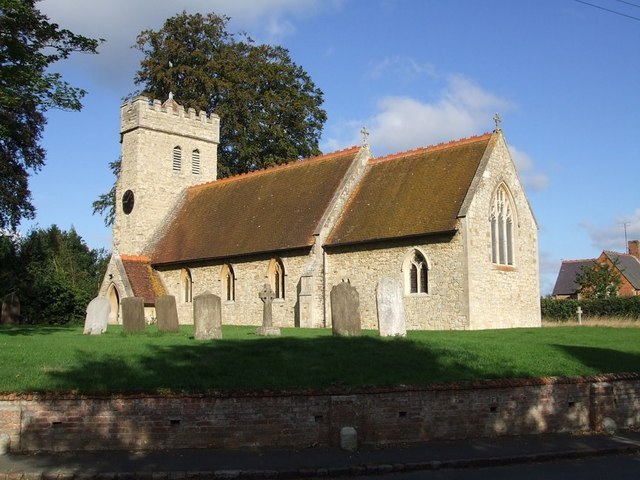
- St James the Great Parish Church

- Location within Buckinghamshire
- Population: 426 (2021, including Burston)
- OS grid reference: SP8420
- Civil parish: Aston Abbotts
- Unitary authority: Buckinghamshire
- Ceremonial county: Buckinghamshire
- Region: South East
- Country: England
- Sovereign state: United Kingdom
- Post town: AYLESBURY
- Postcode district: HP22
- Dialling code: 01296
- Police: Thames Valley
- Fire: Buckinghamshire
- Ambulance: South Central
- UK Parliament: Aylesbury
- Website: Aston Abbotts

Aston Abbotts or Aston Abbots is a village and civil parish in Buckinghamshire, England. It is about 4 miles (6.4 km) north of Aylesbury and 2.5 miles (4 km) south-west of Wing. The parish includes the hamlet of Burston and had a population of 426 at the 2021 Census.

== Manor ==
"Aston" is a common toponym in England, derived from the Old English for "eastern estate". The suffix "Abbotts" refers to the former abbey in the village, which until the Dissolution of the Monasteries in the 16th century was the country home of the abbots of St Albans in Hertfordshire. The present house called The Abbey, Aston Abbotts was largely built in the late 18th century and altered in the early 19th century.

== Parish church ==
The Church of England parish church of St James the Great has a late 15th or early 16th century Perpendicular Gothic west tower, but the rest of the building was demolished in 1865 and replaced with a new nave and chancel designed by the Oxford Diocesan Architect G.E. Street and completed in 1866. The church is a Grade II* listed building.

The church tower has a ring of six bells. Anthony Chandler of Drayton Parslow cast the third and fifth bells in the Commonwealth period in 1652. Edward Hall, also of Drayton Parslow, cast the fourth bell in 1739 and the tenor in 1740. John Taylor & Co of Loughborough cast the treble and second bells in 1929.

The polar explorer Sir James Clark Ross is buried in the churchyard of St James the Great.

== Czechoslovak government-in-exile ==
In the Second World War from 1940 to 1945 Dr Edvard Beneš, the exiled President of Czechoslovakia, stayed at The Abbey in Aston Abbotts. His advisers and secretaries (called his Chancellery) stayed in nearby Wingrave, and his military intelligence staff stayed at nearby Addington. President Beneš gave a bus shelter to the villages of Aston Abbotts and Wingrave in 1944. It is on the A418 road between the two villages.

== Amenities ==
The village had two public houses: "The Bull & Butcher", which closed for conversion to flats in 2003, and the "Royal Oak", which is closed and undergoing change since Covid lockdown in 2019. Aston Abbotts had a village shop, but this closed in 2005.

The nearest shop, post office and school are 1 mile east of Aston Abbotts in the village of Wingrave, with Wingrave offering a Church of England First and Middle school. The nearest secondary school and doctors surgery are 2 miles north east of Aston Abbotts in the village of Wing.

There are regular bus services to Aston Abbotts from Aylesbury and Leighton Buzzard.

== Sources and further reading ==
- Page, W.H., ed. (1925). "Aston Abbots". A History of the County of Buckingham, Volume 3. Victoria County History. pp. 328–330.
- Pevsner, Nikolaus (1960). Buckinghamshire. The Buildings of England. Harmondsworth: Penguin Books. p. 52. ISBN 0-14-071019-1.
- Rees, Neil (2005). The Secret History of The Czech Connection – The Czechoslovak Government in Exile in London and Buckinghamshire. ISBN 0-9550883-0-5.
