= Devilfish =

Devilfish or devil fish may refer to:

== Animals ==
- Species of Mobulidae (devil rays), including:
  - Mobula mobular, known as "devil fish"
  - Mobula birostris, the oceanic manta ray
- Species of Australian Paraplesiops, including:
  - Paraplesiops meleagris, the southern or western blue devil fish
  - Paraplesiops bleekeri, the eastern blue devil fish
- Pelagic anglerfish (Ceratioidei), historically named "sea devils", such as:
  - Ceratiidae, warty seadevils
  - Melanocetidae, black seadevils
- Dosidicus gigas, the "red devil" (Spanish: diablo rojo) squid
- Inimicus didactylus, a venomous scorpionfish

=== Archaic names ===
"Devilfish" was historically used for the following animals:

- Lophius piscatorius, the European angler
- Eschrichtius robustus, gray whales, which fought vigorously when hunted
- Esox lucius, the northern pike
- Octopus

== Mythology and cryptids ==
- Devil Fish, purported Jenny Haniver cryptids
- Devil Fish, octopus-like, carnivorous cryptid, supposedly seen and killed by Czech adventurer Jan Eskymo Welzl in 1906

== Other ==
- Devil Fish (video game), a maze arcade game
- Devilfish (custom car), winner of the 1973 Ridler
- USS Devilfish (SS-292), a Balao-class submarine
- Devilfish, the name of the primary troop transport for the Tau Empire in the fictional universe of Warhammer 40,000
- A set of modifications to the Roland TB-303 Bass Line synthesizer
- The Terminus typeB303 "Devilfish", a 2005 mecha in the anime series Eureka Seven
- Devilfish, the US video-release title given to the 1984 Italian film Monster Shark
- Devilfish, the online persona of the webcomic character Marcy Wisniewski from PvP
- Devilfish, the nickname of poker player Dave Ulliott
- Tampa Bay Rays, a Major League Baseball team originally named the Devil Rays for the devil fish, which remains in use as a retro identity

== See also ==
- Sea devil (disambiguation)
