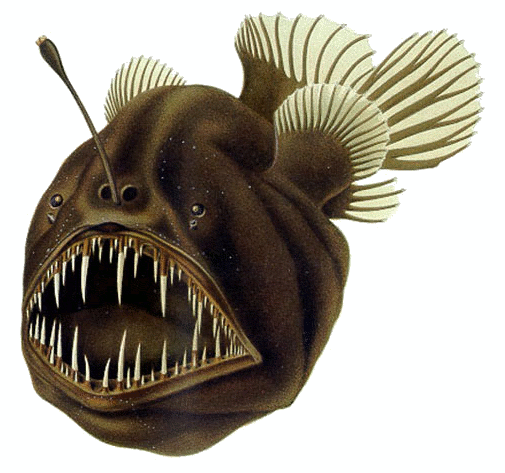

Conservation status
- Least Concern (IUCN 3.1)

Scientific classification
- Kingdom: Animalia
- Phylum: Chordata
- Class: Actinopterygii
- Division: Teleostei
- Order: Lophiiformes
- Family: Melanocetidae
- Genus: Melanocetus
- Species: M. johnsonii

Binomial name
- Melanocetus johnsonii Günther, 1864

= Humpback anglerfish =

Species of fish

The humpback anglerfish (Melanocetus johnsonii) is a species of black seadevil in the family of Melanocetidae, which means "black sea monster". The species is named after James Yate Johnson, an English naturalist who discovered the first specimen in Madeira in 1863. The common names include anglerfish, viperfish, and fangtoothfish.

== Historical background ==
The first specimen of M. johnsonii was discovered by English naturalist James Yates Johnson near Madeira, an archipelago off the coast of northwestern Africa, on December 24, 1863. The specimen was brought to Albert Carl Ludwig Gotthilf Günther, keeper of zoology at the Natural History Museum in London. He described it as "a fish which proves to be the type of a new genus, not only on account of its extraordinary form, but also on account of the absence of pelvic fins." Günther was the first to record the unique morphology of the species; he named it after Johnson, the initial collector. Early hypotheses about anglerfish behavior posited that their illicium and esca, the extended dorsal fin spine and bulbous apparatus that protrude from the snout, are used for luring prey. The Danish naturalist Christian Frederik Lütken was the first to suggest that this feature was central in feeding behavior. Until the 1920s, male specimens without a luring apparatus had been thought to be distinct, and were placed in separate taxonomic categories from their female counterparts. In 1924, British ichthyologist Charles Tate Regan realized that a small fish attached to a larger anglerfish was a male in the process of reproduction, leading to the discovery of the sexual dimorphism that characterizes anglerfish. Several specimens that were previously categorized as separate species, including M. ferox and M. krechi, have since been recognized as synonyms of M. johnsonii.

== Habitat ==
M. johnsonii inhabits the mesopelagic and bathypelagic zones, and is found most commonly at depths between 200 and 1,500 metres (660 and 4,920 ft). Compared to other species in the genus, M. johnsonii is more likely to be found at shallower depths; 65% of recorded specimens were collected at depths of or above 1,000 metres (3,300 ft) below the surface of the water. At these depths, there is little to no light penetrating from the surface photic zone. Because of this, the humpback anglerfish has evolved means of predation using bioluminescence based on the constraints of their habitat.

M. johnsonii has the widest geographic distribution of all the species within the Melanocetus genus. The species had been known to be widely distributed in the temperate and tropical ranges of all oceans, as well as in the South China Sea and the East China Sea. Its southern geographic distribution was expanded in 2014 when the first specimen of M. johnsonii in Antarctic waters was obtained from the stomach of an Antarctic toothfish in the Ross Sea. The specimen was identified by morphologic methods and further genetic analysis using the fish's pectoral fin clip which verified that the specimen belonged to M. johnsonii. An individual specimen of M. johnsonii was found near Father Charles Canyon in British Columbia, extending its known northern distribution in the East Pacific and solidifying it as one of the most widely distributed anglerfish.

== Morphology ==
M. johnsonii is a black soft-bodied anglerfish that is dark brown or black in color. Female humpback anglerfish have short, globular bodies, large heads with a widened mouth that is nearly vertical, and long pointed teeth capable of eating prey larger than themselves. Numerous small skin spines are found under the dorsal fin. Compared to other species within the genus, M. johnsonii has a longer illicium and fewer jaw teeth, but these teeth are relatively longer than those of other species. Like all other anglerfish, females have a short dorsal fin spine (illicium) with a bulbous luring apparatus (esca) on the snout. The esca has compressed posterior and anterior crests, noted when distinguishing it from other anglerfish. Unlike other species in the genus, females of the species have a nearly straightened anterior margin of vomer. Female M. johnsonii have small, subcutaneous eyes that may suggest their lack of dependency on visual sight for feeding and reproduction.

Humpback anglerfish exhibit extreme sexual dimorphism, with larger sized females and dwarfed males. Females have been found to grow up to 153 mm, while males grow only between 15.5 and 28 mm. Males lack a luring apparatus, but have large eyes and nostrils which may be helpful for locating far dispersed mates. While distinguishing characteristics of males in the genus are not well defined, M. johnsonii males usually have a relatively larger number of denticular teeth and dorsal and pectoral fin rays. However, since only eight male specimens were obtained up to date, information concerning males is limited.

Also, as there are many similarities in the morphological characteristics of M. johnsonii and M. rossi, one distinguishing feature is that M. johnsonii has black pigmentation on its upper body exterior while M. rossi does not. Because of the numerous similarities between the two, it has been suggested that M. rossi may be a synonym of the M. johnsonii species.

== Feeding behavior ==
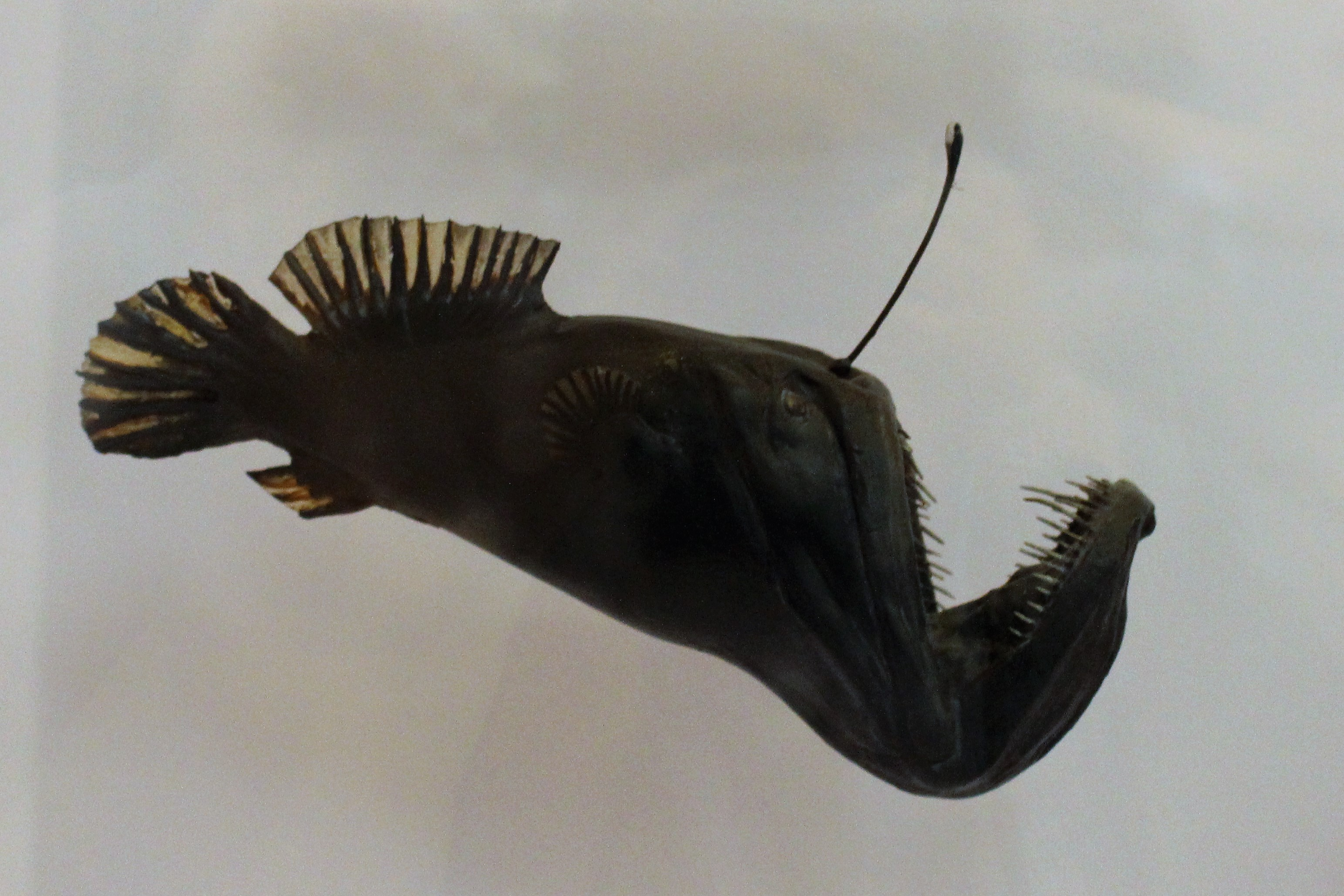
Melanocetus johnsonii model before a meal, at the Natural History Museum in London, England.

M. johnsonii females have large mouths filled with sharp teeth and large stomachs that make them capable of eating nearly everything they encounter. Their stomachs are highly distensible and expand easily, allowing them to consume meals weighing more than themselves. One M. johnsonii individual weighing 8.8 grams was retrieved using a trawl, and the specimen was found to have three snipe eels totaling 12.3 grams in its stomach.

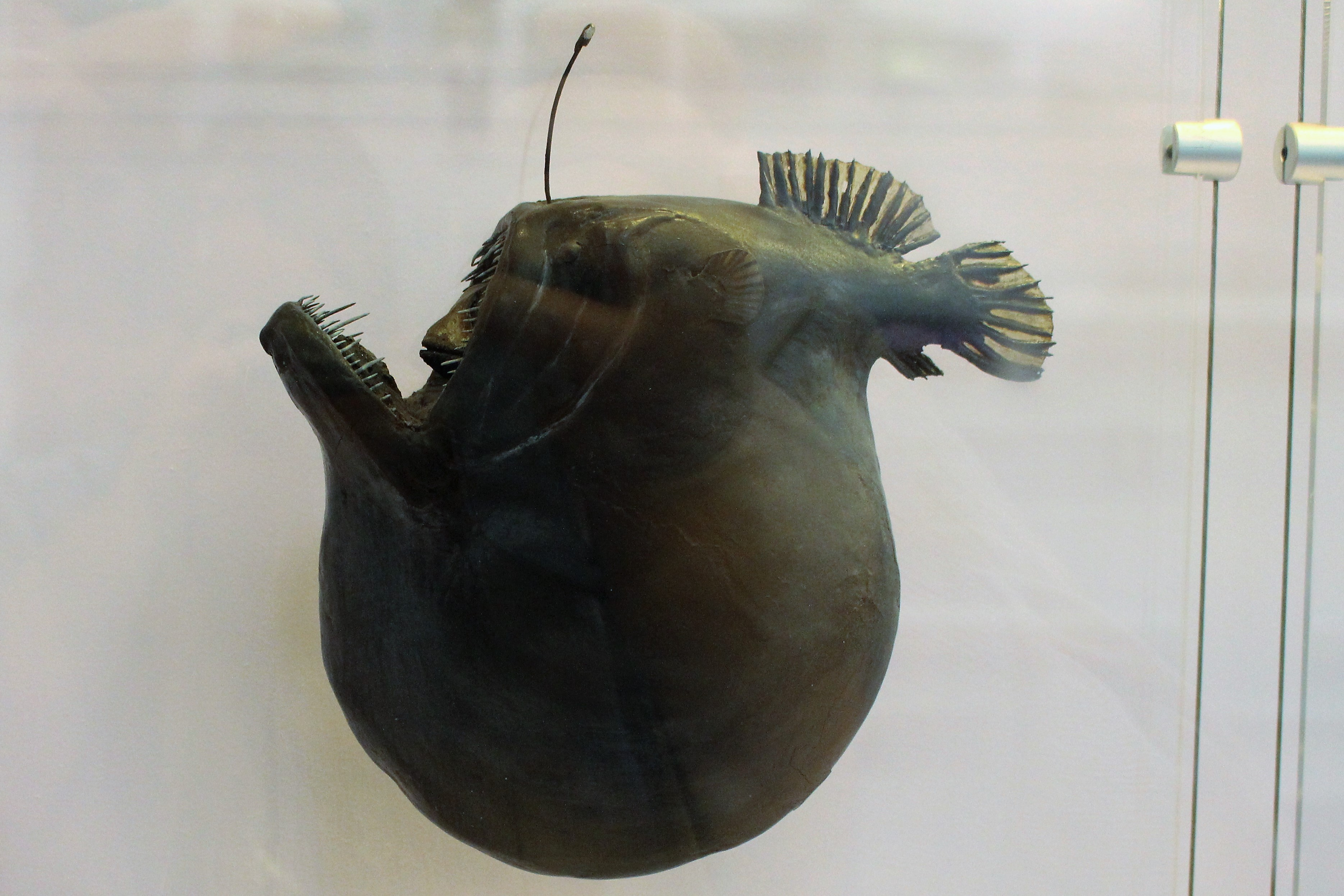
Melanocetus johnsonii model after a meal, at the Natural History Museum in London, England.

Since only 5% of nutrition produced by the photic zone in the open passes down to the deep ocean, there is not much food available in the deep sea. M. johnsonii are ambush predators, meaning that they use a sit-and-wait predation strategy. Individuals of M. johnsonii have a low metabolic rate, even compared to organisms living at similar depths. To test this, experimenters used a trawl to retrieve eight M. johnsonii individuals, all with empty stomachs. The fish were kept alive in a laboratory and their aerobic metabolisms were measured. Researchers found that M. johnsonii is able to regulate its aerobic metabolism by adjusting its oxygen consumption, allowing it to live in hypoxic or anaerobic conditions for long periods of time.

Females use the bulbous esca as a bioluminescent lure to attract prey. The bioluminescence of M. johnsonii is caused by symbiont Enterovibrio escacola bacteria on the esca. It was originally thought that E. escacola was an obligate symbiont of its host because its genome was reduced about 50% compared to an average free-living bacterium. Through genetic analysis and experimentation, it was determined that E. escacola and M. johnsonii are facultatively symbiotic, meaning that they can survive without each other when necessary.

== Reproduction ==
Searching for a mate for M. johnsonii is difficult because they live solitarily and far apart from each other in the deep sea. Males have highly developed sensory organs that allow them to trace the scent of a female as it is minimally disrupted in the still waters of the deep sea. Unlike in other species of anglerfish, males of M. johnsonii are non-parasitic. This means that M. johnsonii males only temporarily attach onto the larger M. johnsonii female using a unique denticular apparatus before releasing their sperm. Once this process is complete, males detach from the females to find other mates. Two cases of this phenomenon have been captured, one on the RRS Discovery in Ireland and the other on the R/V Tansei-Maru. In both instances, there was no evidence of tissue fusion between the male and female anglerfish. The reproduction of black anglerfish is carried out by external fertilization; females release eggs into the water and males then immediately exert their sperm to capture and fertilize the eggs. This unique reproduction process might explain why M. johnsonii males do not live on females for their entire life. Inspection of the morphology of male M. johnsonii supports this non-parasitic mating strategy. Most importantly, both M. johnsonii males and females are able to reach sexual maturity without the presence of the other sex. In parasitic ceratioids, metamorphosed males usually attach to the female before they reach sexual maturity.

== Conservation ==
M. johnsonii was classified as a "Least Concern" species on IUCN Red List of Threatened Species. It is not a food source for humans and, therefore, is not hunted by humans. However, individuals may be collected as bycatch with trawling, and as commercial fisheries shift more toward deep sea resources, the species may become more affected by this catch. The relatively small number of individuals currently recorded may be due to the scarcity of the species in the deep sea environment and the constraints of collecting such widely dispersed deep sea organisms.

== In the media ==
M. johnsonii was filmed in 2014 off of the coast of California by the Monterey Bay Aquarium Research Institute using their remotely operated submersible Doc Ricketts. The video shows a female M. johnsonii slowly swimming at a depth of about 1,900 feet in the Monterey Canyon.

On February 5, 2025, photographer David Jara Boguñá, marine biologist Marc Martín Solá and others on an expedition by Condrik Tenerife, 2 kilometers away from the coast of Tenerife Island, filmed and photographed a living female specimen during daytime at the ocean surface. The video shows the animal slowly making its way up to the surface. This may be the first recorded instance of the species under these conditions.
