= Bernacchi Head =

Important Bird Area in Antarctica

Coordinates: 76°8′S 168°20′E

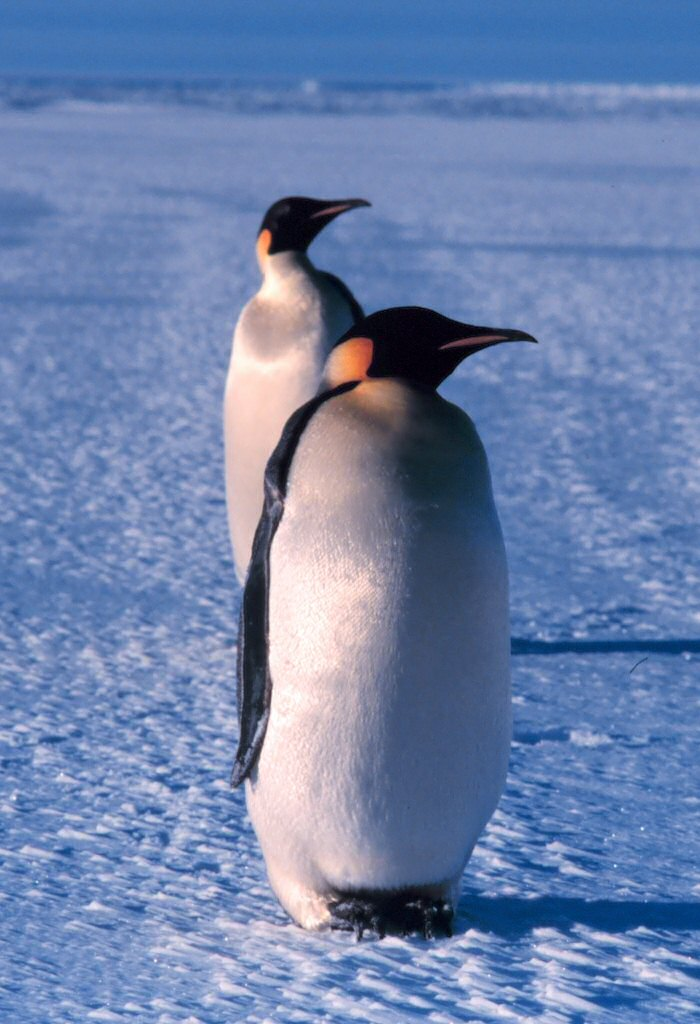
Emperor penguins breed on the ice by Bernacchi Head

Bernacchi Head is a precipitous cliff forming the southern extremity of Franklin Island in the Ross Sea of Antarctica. It was named "Cape Bernacchi" by the British Antarctic Expedition, 1898–1900, for Louis C. Bernacchi, a member of the expedition. The generic name has been changed to "Head" by the Advisory Committee on Antarctic Names to avoid duplication with Cape Bernacchi on the coast of Victoria Land.

== Important Bird Area ==
A 419 ha area of sea ice close off the eastern coast of Bernacchi Head has been identified as an Important Bird Area (IBA) by BirdLife International because it supports a breeding colony of about 7,500 emperor penguins (estimated from 2009 satellite imagery).

== See also ==
- Norway Rocks
