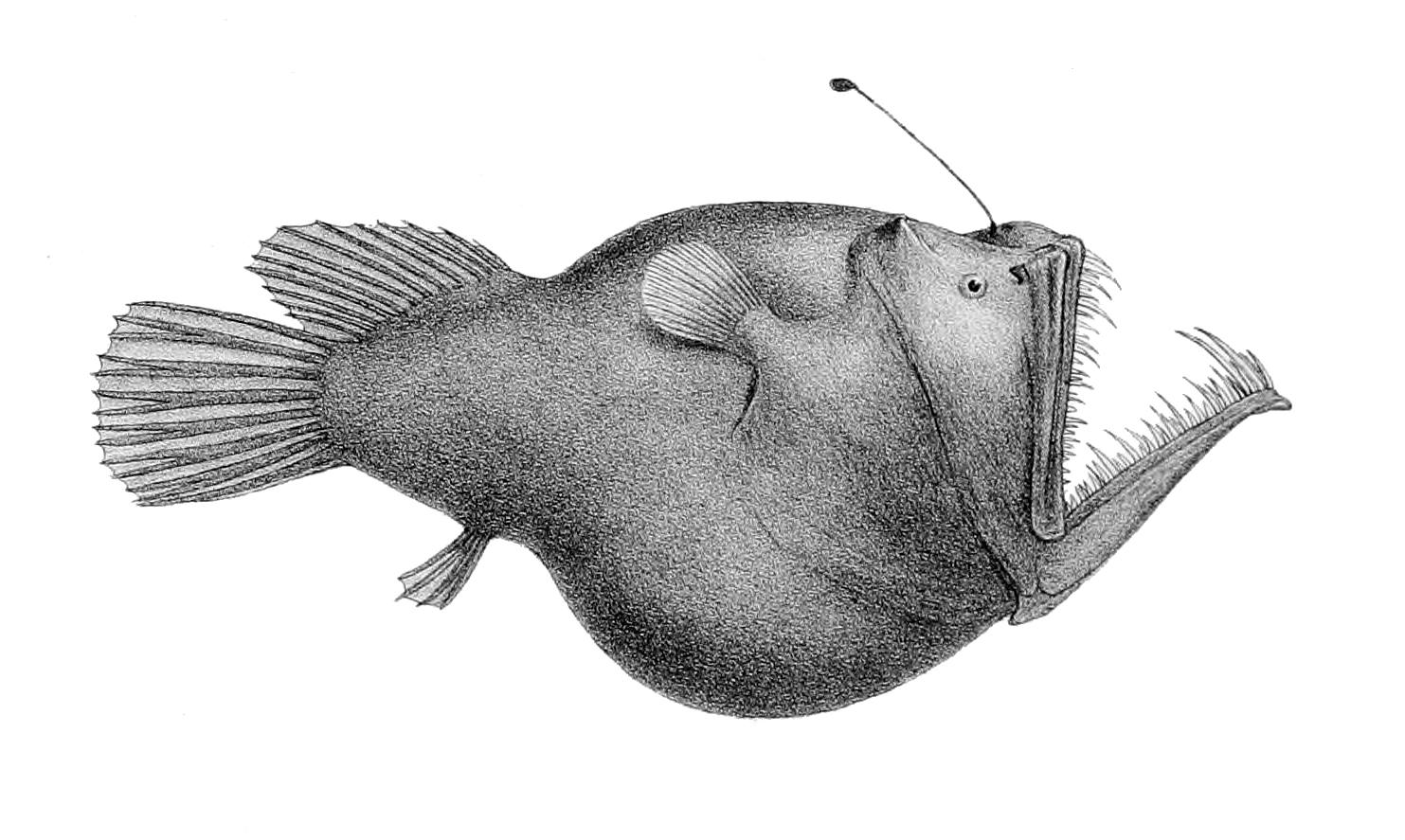

Conservation status
- Least Concern (IUCN 3.1)

Scientific classification
- Kingdom: Animalia
- Phylum: Chordata
- Class: Actinopterygii
- Order: Lophiiformes
- Family: Melanocetidae
- Genus: Melanocetus
- Species: M. murrayi

Binomial name
- Melanocetus murrayi Günther, 1887

Synonyms
- Melanocetus tumidus Parr, 1927; Melanocetus vorax Brauer, 1902; Rhynchoceratias acanthirostris Parr, 1927; Rhynchoceratias latirhinus Parr, 1927; Rhynchoceratias longipinnis Parr, 1930; Rhynchoceratis latirhinus Parr, 1927; Xenoceratias acanthirostris (Parr, 1927); Xenoceratias latirhinus (Parr, 1927); Xenoceratias longipinnis (Parr, 1930); Xenoceratias regani Koefoed, 1944

= Melanocetus murrayi =

Murray's abyssal anglerfish

Species of fish

Melanocetus murrayi, commonly known as Murray's abyssal anglerfish, is a deep sea anglerfish in the family Melanocetidae, found in tropical to temperate parts of the world's oceans at depths down to over 2,000 m (6,600 ft).

== Taxonomy ==
Melanocetus murrayi was first described by the German zoologist Albert Günther in 1887 from material dredged up from the deep on the Challenger expedition of 1872 to 1876, the first scientific attempt to research the ocean depths; it was named in honour of Sir John Murray, a British biologist who took part in the expedition and was one of the founders of the new study of oceanography.

== Description ==
Like other anglerfish in the genus, the female M. murrayi has a large oblique mouth, jaws with long depressible fangs, small nostrils raised on a prominence, an illiceum (a long modified dorsal spine used as a lure), and skin without scales. It differs from others in the genus in having the width between the eyes between 2/5 and 4/7 of the width of the head and the lower jaw being 2/5 to 1/2 the fish's length. The illicium is 1/4 to 1/3 the length of the fish, and the bioluminescent esca on the tip is oval, sometimes with a raised crest at the back. The second dorsal fin has 12 to 14 soft rays, the anal fin has 3 to 4, the pectoral fin 15 to 18 and the caudal fin 9. Females grow to a length of about 13.5 cm (5 in) and males to 2.8 cm (1.1 in).

== Distribution ==
M. murrayi has a cosmopolitan distribution in tropical to temperate parts of the world's oceans, between about 64°N and 43°S, and at depths from the surface down to over 2,000 m (6,600 ft), although most of the individuals recovered have been at greater depths than 1,500 m (4,900 ft).

== Status ==
This fish, sometimes caught as bycatch in deep sea trawling, is known from records of over three hundred female fish and four free-swimming males. Most of the sightings are at depths below 1,500 m (4,900 ft) and the fish appears to be an uncommon species. However, no particular threats to the species have been identified, and the International Union for Conservation of Nature has rated its conservation status as being of "least concern".
