= Melanocetus polyactis =

Scientific classification
- Domain: Eukaryota
- Kingdom: Animalia
- Phylum: Chordata
- Class: Actinopterygii
- Order: Lophiiformes
- Family: Melanocetidae
- Genus: Melanocetus
- Species: M. polyactis

Binomial name
- Melanocetus polyactis Regan, 1925

Species of fish

Melanocetus polyactis is a species of black seadevil, a type of anglerfish. The fish is bathypelagic and has been found at depths ranging from 1,000 to 2,200 metres (3,300 to 7,200 ft). It is endemic to the Gulf of Panama.
