= Seeteufel (Russia) =

History

Russia
- Name: Seeteufel
- Namesake: Sea Devil

General characteristics
- Type: Manually powered submarine
- Length: 51 ft (16 m)
- Beam: 12.5 ft (3.8 m)
- Installed power: manually powered

Seeteufel (Sea Devil) was a hand-powered submarine designed by Wilhelm Bauer in 1856. Run by a crew of 15, the ship was made of iron and was 51 feet (16 m) long, 12.5 feet (3.8 m) wide and 11 feet (3.4 m) deep. After his last submarine, Brandtaucher, had sunk, Bauer included a diver's chamber in the design. Through this chamber, which worked like an airlock, divers could leave and enter the submerged vessel. He had tried to obtain support for his invention in several countries, including Austria-Hungary, the British Empire or France.

Finally, in 1855, Bauer made a contract with Russia. He built his submarine at the Leutemberg Works, and it was completed on 1 November. In May 1856 it was taken to Kronstadt and testing began. The submarine made 133 successful diving runs. One such dive was undertaken in honor of the coronation of Alexander II on 6 September 1856, the national anthem of Russia was performed while the submarine was underwater. During the 134th dive, the submarine got stuck on the ocean floor. The crew survived, and the ship was later retrieved by a salvage crew. Despite being cleaned up after this, nothing further happened with the submarine.
