= Melanocetus niger =

Scientific classification
- Domain: Eukaryota
- Kingdom: Animalia
- Phylum: Chordata
- Class: Actinopterygii
- Order: Lophiiformes
- Family: Melanocetidae
- Genus: Melanocetus
- Species: M. niger

Binomial name
- Melanocetus niger Regan, 1925

Species of fish

Melanocetus niger is a species of black seadevil, a type of anglerfish. They have big mouths, with plenty of long teeth, and numerous fin rays. The fish is bathypelagic and has been found at depths ranging from 1,200 to 2,000 metres (3,900 to 6,600 ft). It is endemic to the eastern Pacific Ocean off the coast of Chile.
