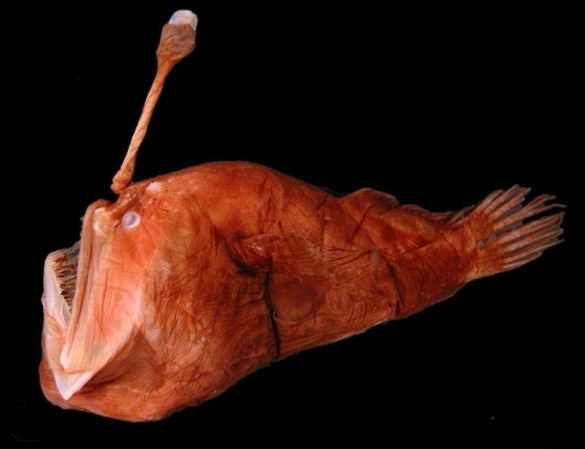

Conservation status
- Data Deficient (IUCN 3.1)

Scientific classification
- Kingdom: Animalia
- Phylum: Chordata
- Class: Actinopterygii
- Order: Lophiiformes
- Family: Melanocetidae
- Genus: Melanocetus
- Species: M. eustalus

Binomial name
- Melanocetus eustalus Pietsch & Van Duzer, 1980

= Melanocetus eustalus =

Species of fish

Melanocetus eustalus is a deep sea anglerfish in the family Melanocetidae, found off the Pacific coast of Mexico at depths down to about 1,675 m (5,500 ft).
