= Wilhelm Bauer =

German marine engineer and inventor (1822–1875)

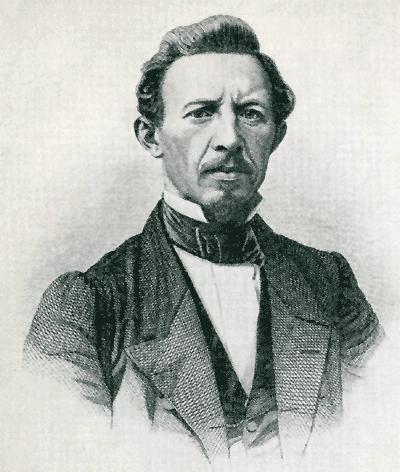
- Born: 23 December 1822; Dillingen, Kingdom of Bavaria, German Confederation
- Died: 20 June 1875 (aged 52); Munich, Kingdom of Bavaria, German Empire
- Notable work: Brandtaucher (1850); Seeteufel (1856)
- Engineering career
- Discipline: Marine engineering

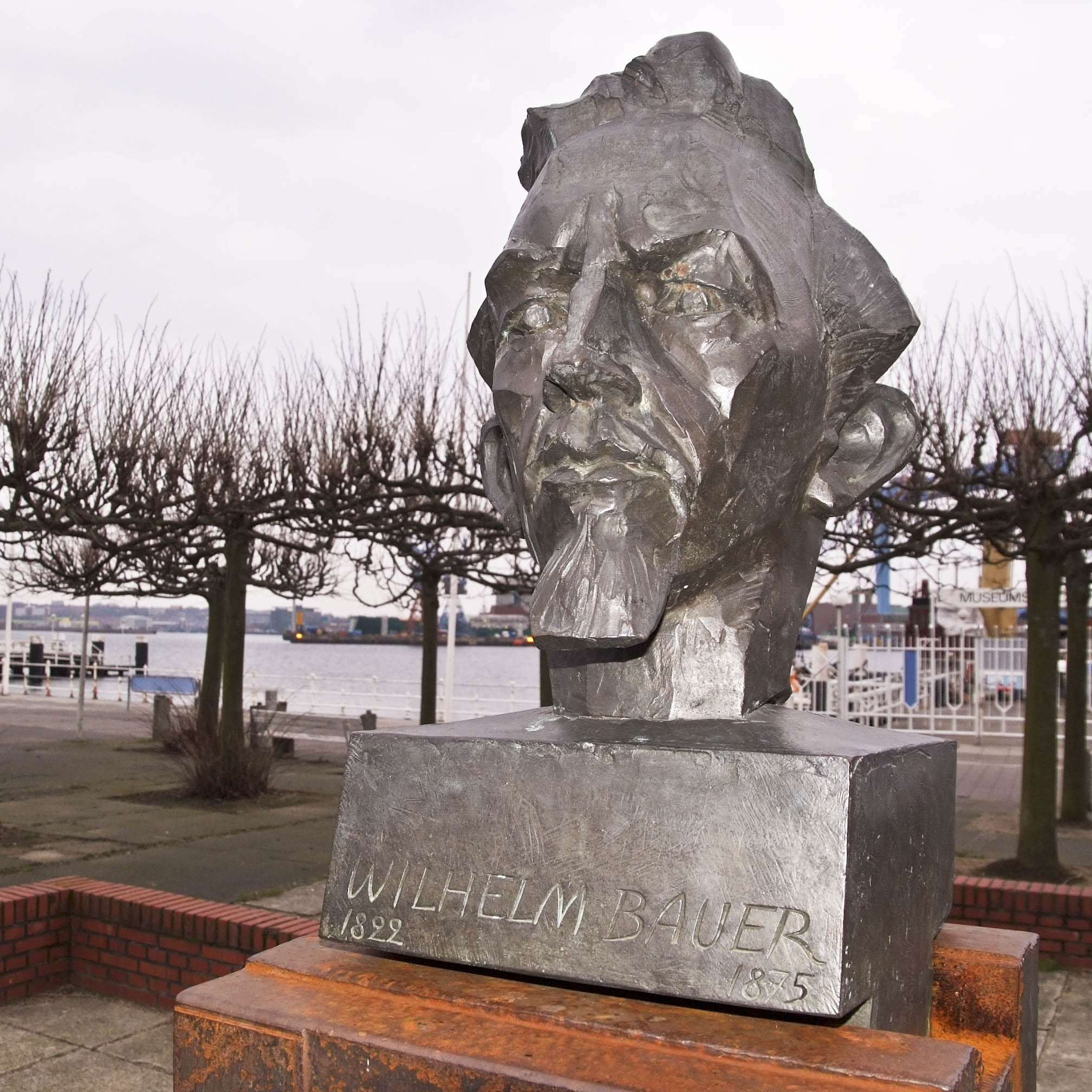
Sculpture in Kiel, Germany

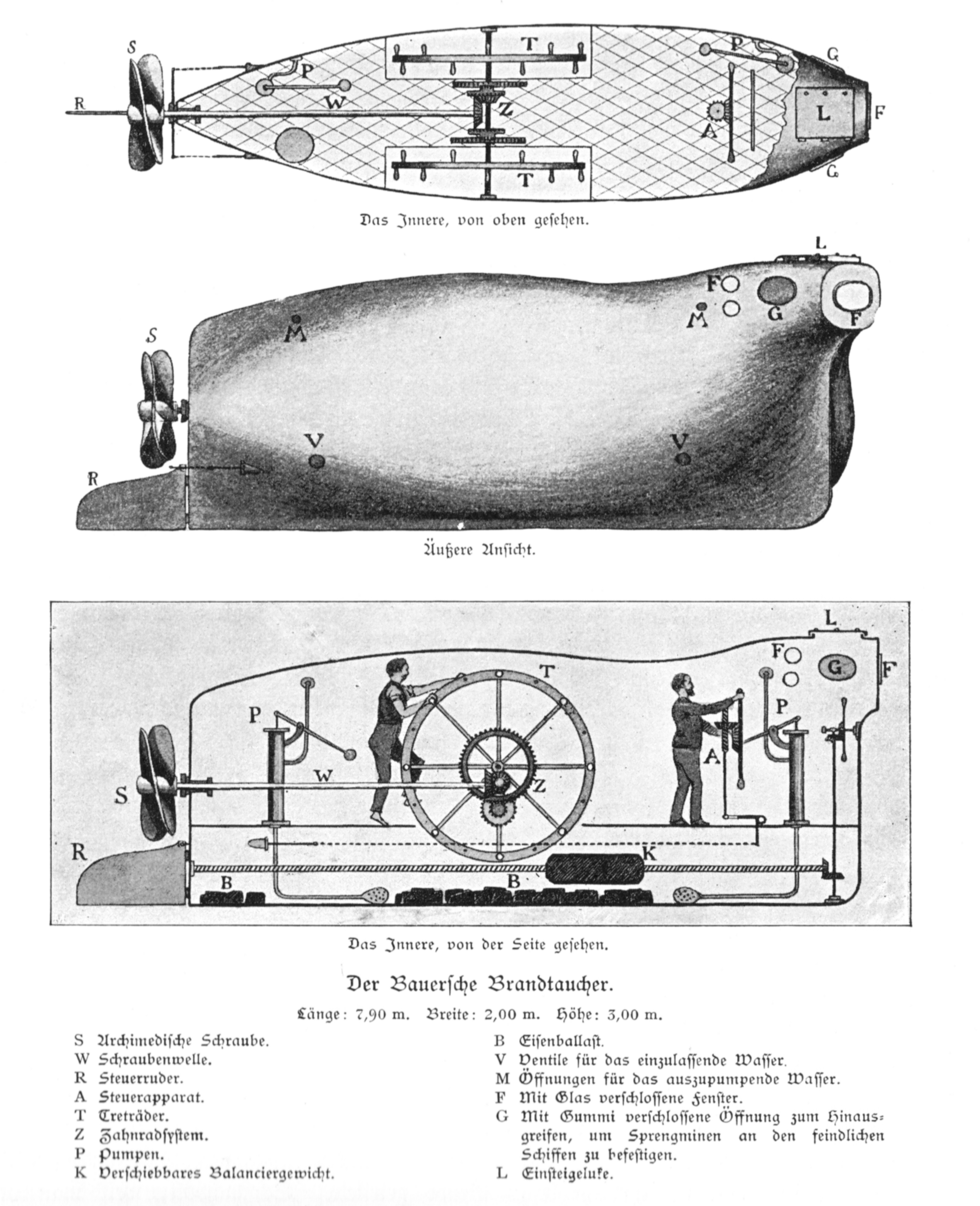
Sketch of the Brandtaucher

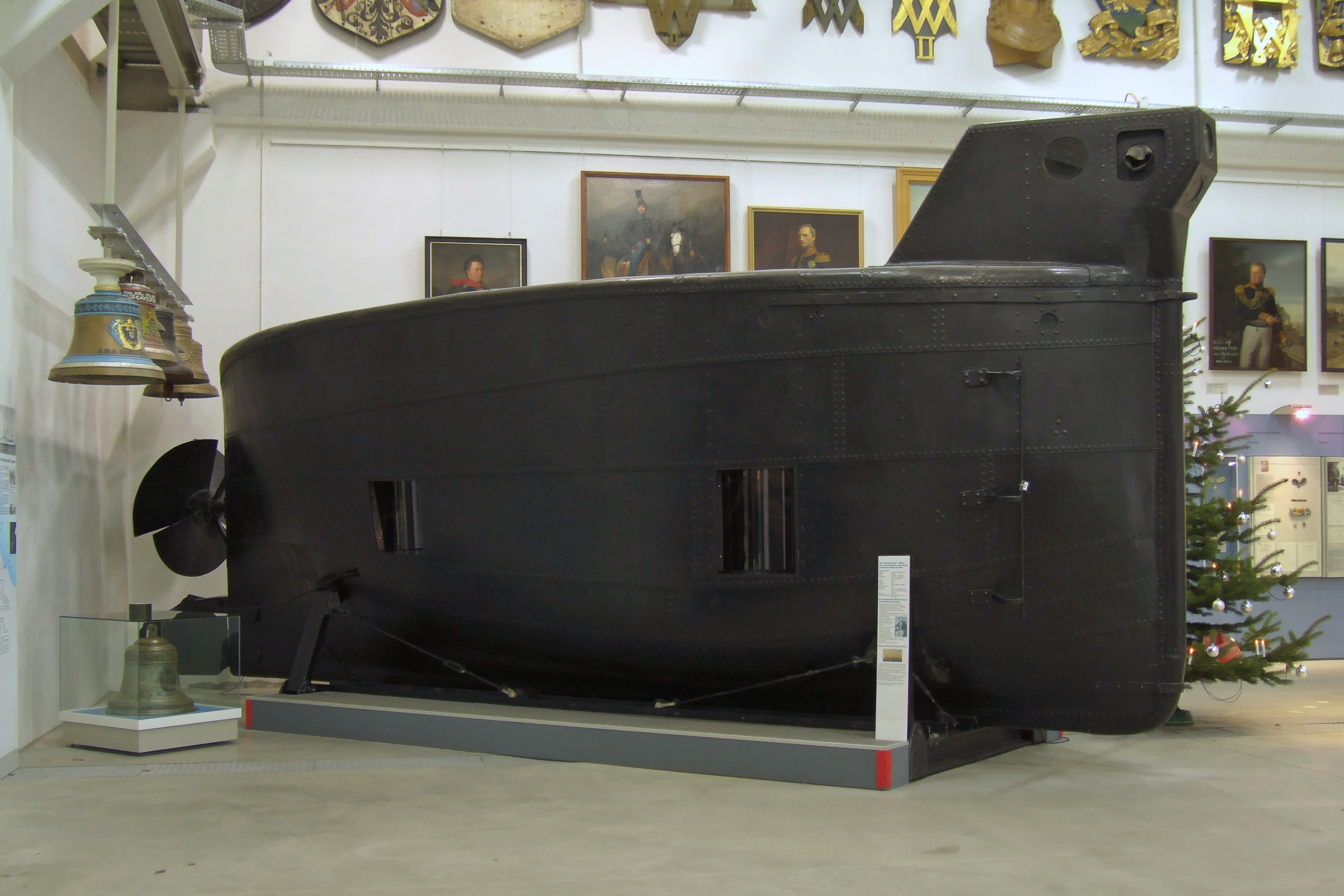
The Brandtaucher on display

Wilhelm Bauer (German: [ˈvɪlhɛlm ˈbaʊɐ]; 23 December 1822 – 20 June 1875) was a German marine engineer and inventor who built several hand-powered submarines.

== Biography ==
Wilhelm Bauer was born in Dillingen in the Kingdom of Bavaria. His father was a sergeant in a Bavarian cavalry regiment. After an apprenticeship as a wood turner, Bauer also joined the army. Working as an artillery engineer, he witnessed the German/Danish war for Schleswig-Holstein between 1848 and 1851.

Seeing how the Prussian coast was easily blockaded by the Danish navy, Bauer quickly developed a plan to build a new type of submersible ship to help break the blockade. He began studying hydraulics and ship construction. However, before his studies could get very far, the troops of the German Confederation decided to withdraw and surrendered Schleswig-Holstein to Denmark. However, Bauer was determined to realize his plan and left the Bavarian Army to join the forces of Schleswig-Holstein.

It proved very hard for Bauer, who held only a low military rank, to get his plans through the military bureaucracy, not to mention obtaining funds to build his submarine. He finally succeeded with the help of Werner von Siemens and others, being granted a small sum to build a model of his proposed u-boat.

== The Brandtaucher ("Incendiary Diver") Submarine ==
Incendiary ships were a well known concept in blockade-breaking. A ship was loaded with explosives and set free to drift into the enemy fleet, exploding at contact. The incendiary diver was planned to work on a similar principle: It would dive under an enemy vessel, fix an electrically triggered mine to its hull and escape, igniting the mine from a safe distance. More or less the same technique was employed by all military submarine designs of that time, like Julius Kröhl’s Explorer, the U.S.S. Alligator by Brutus de Villeroi and the famous Hunley, which became the first submarine to sink an enemy vessel.

After the model of the submarine, built by Bauer himself, proved to be working, he was granted sufficient funds to build a full scale submarine. But the military authorities still were largely against Bauer’s plan and forced Bauer to change his designs in order to reduce costs.

The finished Brandtaucher, built by August Howaldt of the later Howaldtswerke was 28 feet long, weighing about 70,000 pounds. As at that time no suitable mechanical power system was available, the submarine was powered by two sailors turning a big tread wheel with their hands and feet. The third crew member, the captain, was positioned at the stern of the submarine. His job was to operate the rudders and other controls. Having arrived under the target ship, the captain would reach out through a gutta percha (rubber) glove fixed to an opening of the hull, grab the mine located within reach on the hull of the submarine and fix it on the target.

Had the Brandtaucher been built according to Bauer’s original designs, it would have achieved submersion by filling several tanks with sea water. But in the changed version the vessel itself was to be partly flooded with water, thus rendering the submarine dangerously unstable. Also the thickness of the hull and the dimensions of the pumps had to be greatly reduced.

First trials of the submarine took place in December 1850. Although Bauer wanted to make several improvements of the submarine, the military ordered a public show on 1 February 1851.

This public demonstration almost ended in a disaster. After reaching a depth of 30 ft the craft began to lay down by the stern. As the submarine sank down, the thin walls could not take the water pressure any more and started to crack. The water pressure proved too much for the weak pumps and the propeller wheel was damaged when the vessel began to keel over. The submarine slowly sank to the ground of the Kiel harbour. For six hours Bauer and his sailors had to wait inside the sunken craft, until enough water had seeped in. This increased the air pressure inside the submarine and finally allowed the men to open the blocked hatchway. As the submarine stayed buried on the ground of the sea, its crew came to the surface unharmed. This was the first submarine escape to be witnessed and reported.

The sunken submarine was raised in 1887 and can now be visited at the museum of military history at Dresden, Germany (Militärhistorisches Museum der Bundeswehr).

== The Seeteufel ("Sea Devil") Submarine ==
After the sinking of the Brandtaucher, Bauer instantly began to make plans for an improved, larger submarine. But the government of Schleswig-Holstein refused to support Bauer after their bad experience with Bauer’s first submarine.

So Bauer left Schleswig-Holstein. In the following years he tried to obtain support for his invention in several countries, like the Austria-Hungary, the British Empire or France. Finally, in 1855, Bauer made a contract with the grand prince of St. Petersburg (Russia). During that year Bauer built his second submarine, the Seeteufel (Sea Devil or Angler) in St. Petersburg.

Much less information is known about this submarine than about the Brandtaucher. However, it is said to have been twice as long as its predecessor, its iron walls 1/2' thick with 21 windows in them. It had three big cylinders to hold water as diving ballast and was designed for a crew of 12.

Having learned from his first boat’s disaster, Bauer provided the Sea Devil with a newly invented rescue device: the diver’s chamber. Through this chamber, which worked like an airlock, divers could leave and enter the submerged vessel.

The Sea Devil proved to be a very good design. It made 133 successful diving runs within four months. But during the 134th dive, the submarine got stuck in the sand of the seafloor. By emptying the water cylinders with the pumps, the crew managed to raise the submarine high enough so that the hatchway was above the waterline. The whole crew (including Bauer) was saved, but unfortunately, the submarine sank back to the bottom of the sea.

== Legacy ==
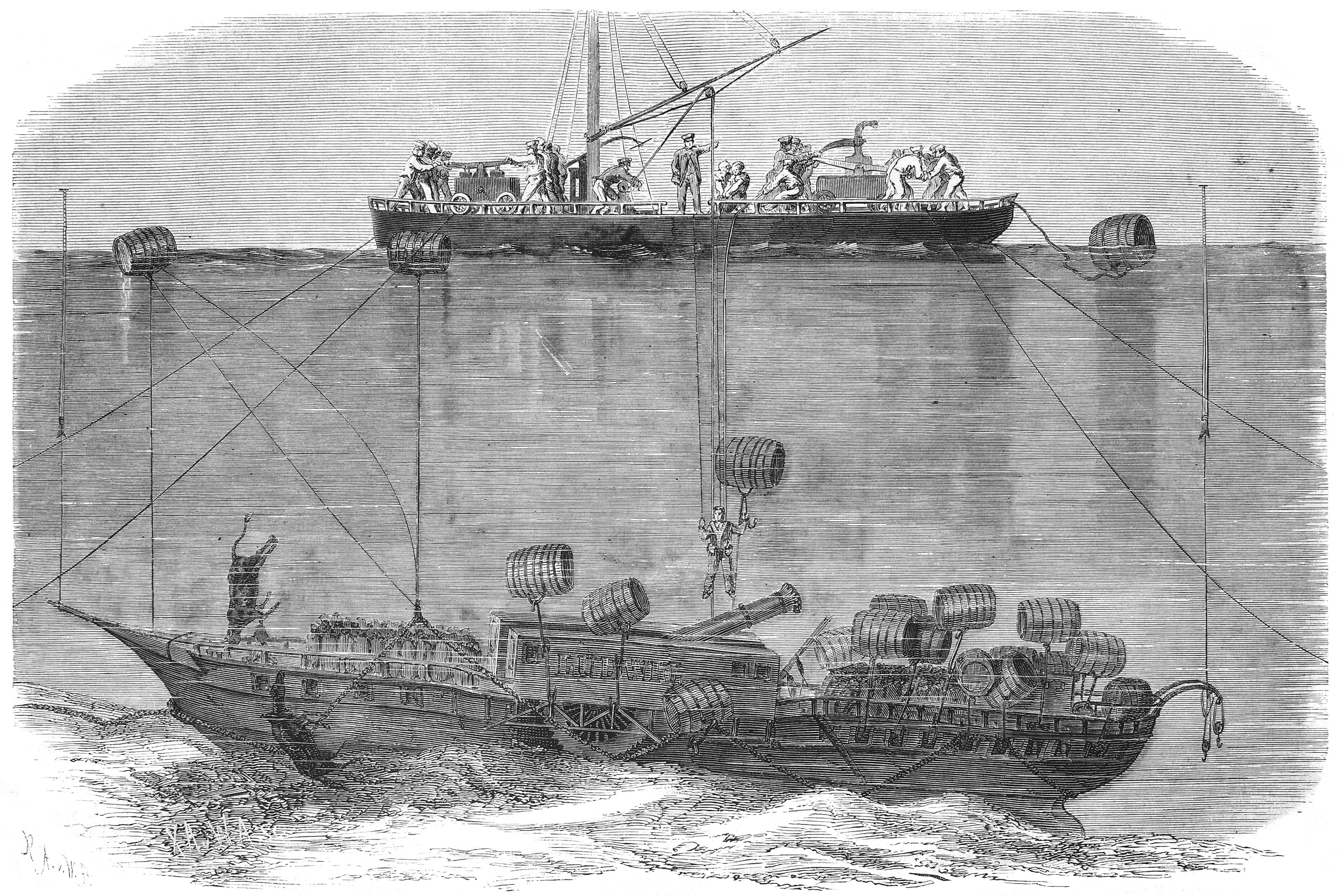
The raising of the Ludwig in Lake Constance, 1863. Die Gartenlaube

After the end of the Sea Devil, Bauer left Russia. Realizing he would not find support for another submarine, he undertook other projects. In 1863 Bauer managed to raise a sunken ship by using inflatable balloons made of canvas. But his more ambitious plans all failed because of a complete lack of funding. Disappointed, Bauer died in 1875 in Munich.

It would be wrong to claim the German submarine fleet of the World wars was directly descended from Wilhelm Bauer’s prototypes, but he nevertheless influenced them. The modern submarine began its history with the inventions of Simon Lake and John Philip Holland. However, the submarine pioneers of the 19th century - de Villeroi, Monturiol, Hunley and others - were all aware of Bauer’s efforts and drew inspiration and even ideas from his submarine.

In 1960 the German Bundesmarine renamed a Type XXI submarine Wilhelm Bauer after him.

== Films about Bauer ==
In 1941, German director Herbert Selpin directed a biopic about Bauer with the title Geheimakte W.B.1 (Secret file W.B.1; W.B = Wilhelm Bauer)), which was released in 1942. It was a propaganda movie to further the submarine war. The plot was based on the novel Der Eiserne Seehund (The iron seal) from Hans Arthur Thies, published in 1941.

Bauer's life and work, as well as the design principles of his “Incendiary diver”, are described in the documentary film Submarine Ingenieur by Kiel-based filmmaker Zoran Simic. His film uses numerous 3D graphics sequences to illustrate the functioning of the submarine. On 3 February 2008 the 57-minute version of the film was shown in the local cinema, in the event centre KoKi, in Kiel.

== See also ==
- German inventors and discoverers
