= Hamburg Sea Devils =

Two American football franchises have been referred to as the Hamburg Sea Devils:

- Hamburg Sea Devils (NFL Europe), active in NFL Europe between 2005 and 2007
- Hamburg Sea Devils (ELF), active in the European League of Football since 2021
