= Melanocetus rossi =

Scientific classification
- Kingdom: Animalia
- Phylum: Chordata
- Class: Actinopterygii
- Order: Lophiiformes
- Family: Melanocetidae
- Genus: Melanocetus
- Species: M. rossi

Binomial name
- Melanocetus rossi Balushkin & Fedorov, 1981

Species of fish

Melanocetus rossi is a species of black seadevil, a type of anglerfish. The fish is mesopelagic; the only example collected by humans was found in the Ross Sea at a depth of 390 metres (1,280 ft).

== Etymology ==
The fish is named in honor of James Clark Ross (1800–1862), a polar captain, and researcher of the Arctic and Antarctic, for whom the Ross Sea, in Antarctica, where the only known specimen was collected, was named.
