= The Abbey, Aston Abbotts =

Coordinates: 51.8721°N 0.7734°W

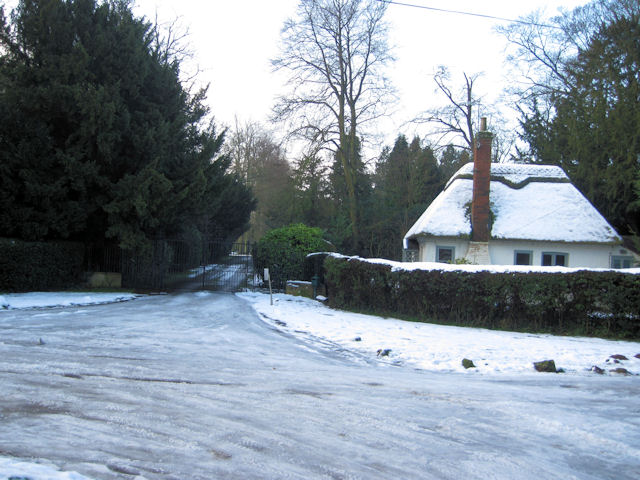
Entrance to the Abbey at Aston Abbotts

The Abbey, Aston Abbotts is a country house in Buckinghamshire, England. The house derived its name from being a property of St. Albans Abbey in the Middle Ages, and it belonged to the Dormer family from the Dissolution of the Monasteries until the early 19th century. While in their ownership the house was almost continuously tenanted, and it was altered in a piecemeal way as a result. In the early 20th century it was a secondary seat of the Spencer family of Coles Hall. It was the family home for Captain Harold and Mrs Beatrice (née Shaw) Morton in 1923 and sold in 1989 after their deaths. It is now an L-shaped house with a plain, mildly neo-Classical, south front of c.1800, masking a medieval hall and dining-room, and Queen Anne drawing-room at W. end; the smaller west wing is Elizabethan.

There has been a property at the location since before the Domesday Book. Although the Abbey has never been an ecclesiastical building, it was so named having been built on land confiscated from the Abbotts of St. Albans by Henry VIII.

The property has had some illustrious owners including the Duke of Buckingham, Sir James Clark Ross, the polar explorer who gave his name to many geographical features in the Antarctic, such as the Ross Ice Shelf, and President Benes of Czechoslovakia.

During the Second World War from 1940 to 1945 Dr Edvard Beneš, the exiled President of Czechoslovakia, stayed at the Abbey in Aston Abbotts. During this period the Morton family moved to The White House, Aston Abbotts. Major Morton being invested him as a Commander in the Order of the White Lion (Order of the White Lion, third class), for services to the Home Guard and wartime defence of the Czechoslovaks.

In the gardens of the Abbey there is a lake with two islands, named after the Ross expedition's ships HMS Erebus and HMS Terror.
