= Brandtaucher =

1850 human-powered submarine by Wilhelm Bauer

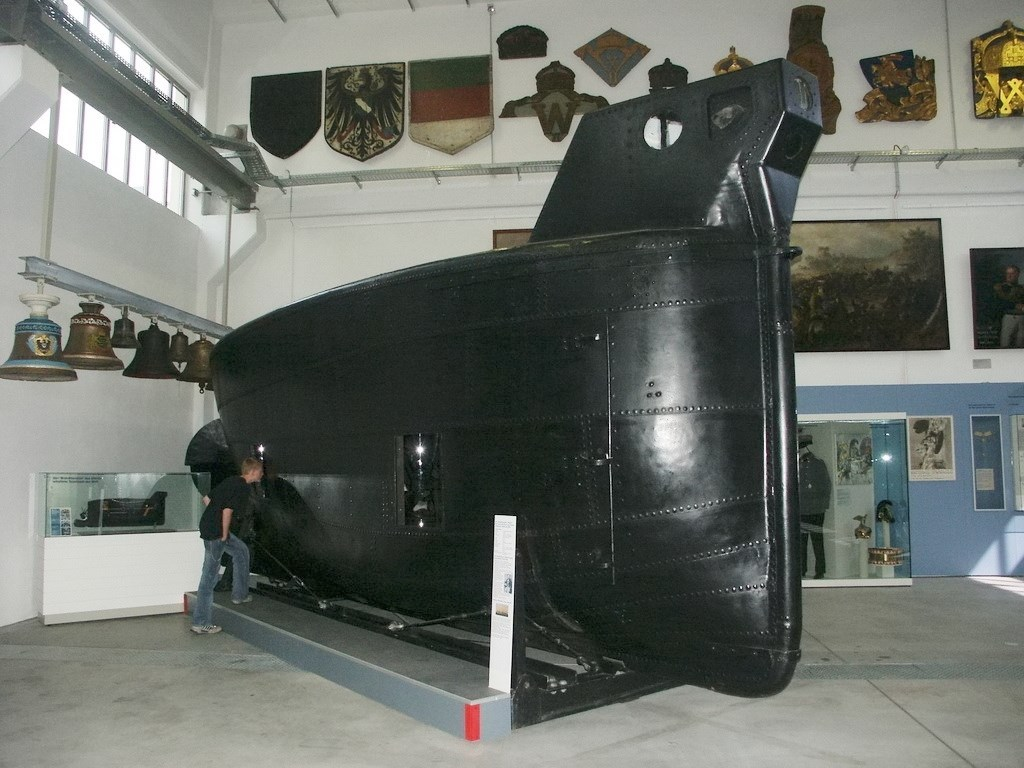
- Brandtaucher on display at the Bundeswehr Military History Museum, Dresden

History

Germany
- Name: Brandtaucher
- Builder: Schweffel & Howaldt, Kiel
- Launched: 1850
- Fate: Sank, 1 February 1851; Raised, 5 July 1887
- Status: Museum ship

General characteristics
- Type: Submarine
- Length: 8.07 m (26.5 ft)
- Beam: 2.02 m (6 ft 8 in)
- Depth: 2.63 m (8 ft 8 in)
- Propulsion: Cranked propeller
- Speed: 3 knots (5.6 km/h; 3.5 mph)
- Test depth: 9.5 m (31 ft)
- Complement: 3

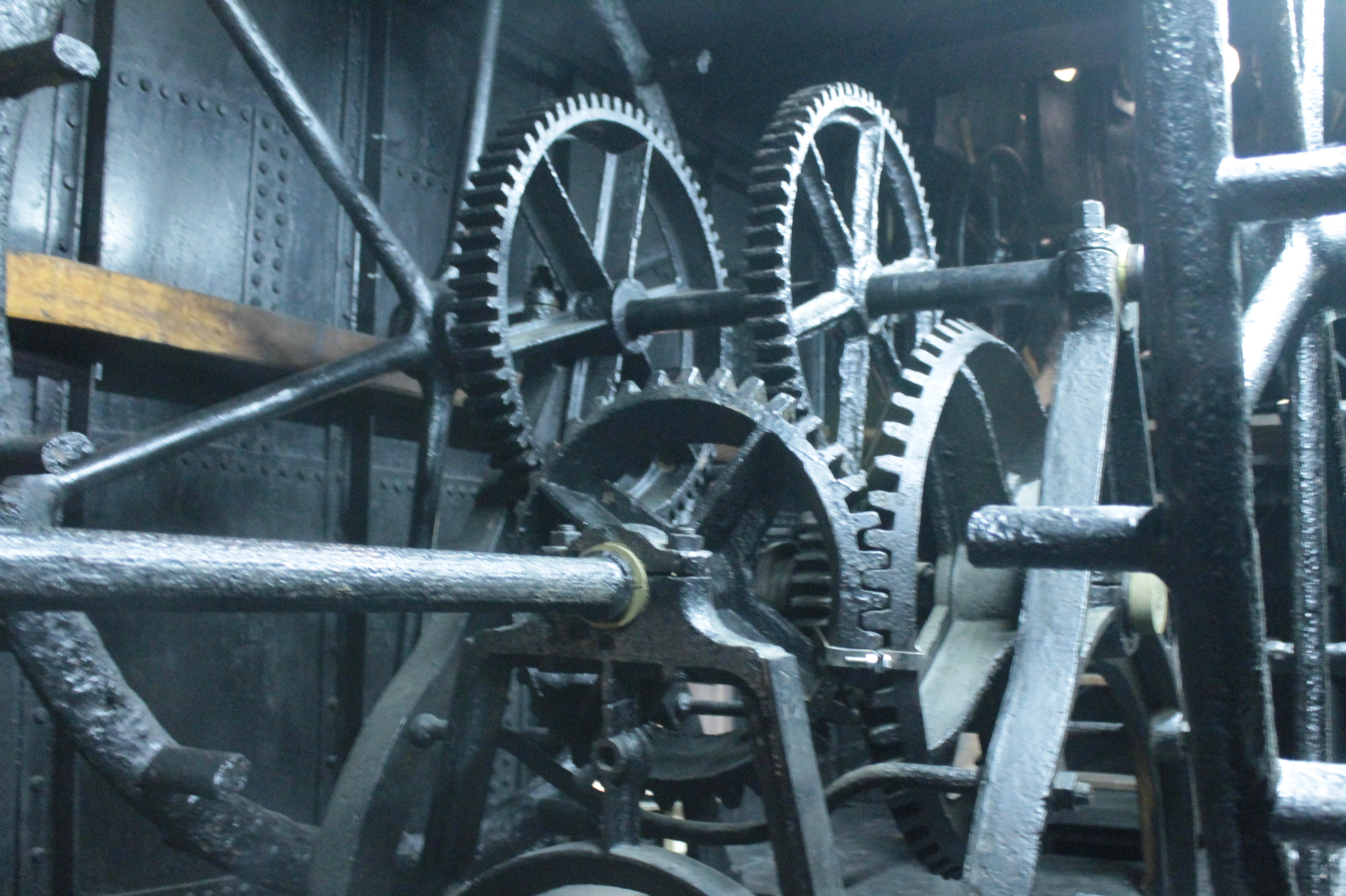
Internal mechanism of the Brandtaucher submarine in Dresden

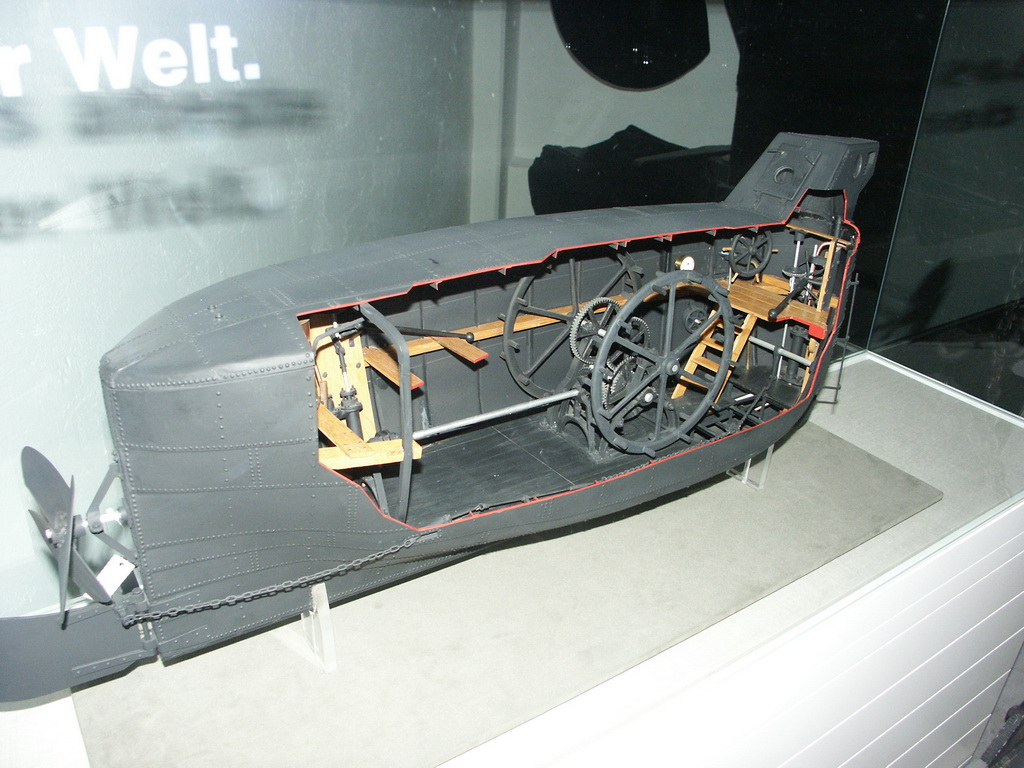
The Brandtaucher submarine cutaway model in Dresden, Germany

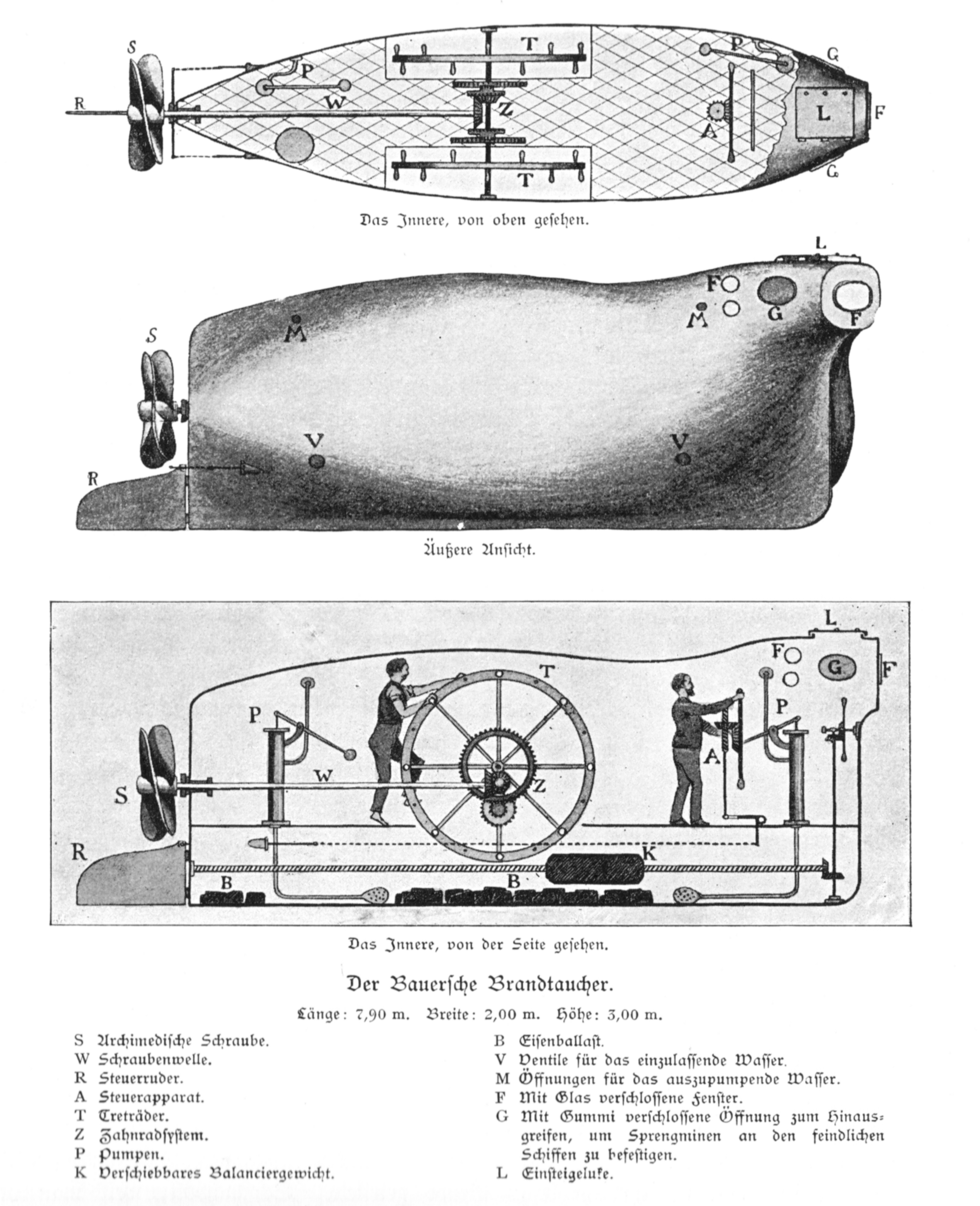
Sketch of the Brandtaucher (from an 1896 book)

Brandtaucher (German for Fire-diver) was a submersible designed by the Bavarian inventor and engineer Wilhelm Bauer and built by Schweffel & Howaldt in Kiel for Schleswig-Holstein's Flotilla (part of the Reichsflotte) in 1850. The Brandtaucher is the oldest known surviving submarine in the world.

== History ==
In January 1850, Bauer, a cavalryman during the First Schleswig War, designed Brandtaucher as a way to end the Danish naval blockade of Germany. A submarine could affix mines on hulls of enemy ships undetected, and detonate them from a safe distance. Bauer's early sketch attracted the attention of the Minister of Marine, who allowed him to construct a 70 × 18 × 29 cm (27.6 × 7.1 × 11.4 in) model. The model was demonstrated in Kiel harbour in front of naval dignitaries. Its satisfactory performance led to the construction of a full-scale model, which was funded by contributions from army personnel and local civilians.

Due to the inadequate funding, the scale of the boat had to be downgraded and the design altered and simplified; resulting in a reduced diving depth from 30 m (98 ft) to 9.5 m (31 ft). This redesign included eliminating the use of enclosed ballast tanks to contain the water being taken into and expelled from the submarine. Instead, the water was allowed to pool inside the bottom of the hull, below the main floor, and was able to move relatively unobstructed within this area when the ship changed orientation. The resulting instability was probably a significant contributing factor to the loss of the vessel.

Also, the control compartment was eliminated and replaced by an adjustable weight of 0.5 Tonne for trimming the boat and a 20-Tonne iron ballast keel.

As built, Brandtaucher was 8.07 m (26.5 ft) long and 2.02 m (6.6 ft) at maximum beam, with a draught of 2.63 m (8.6 ft). It was propelled by a crew of three turning large tread wheels connected to a propeller. The boat could reach a speed of three knots, but this could not be maintained for long periods of time.

On 1 February 1851, Brandtaucher sank after a diving accident during acceptance trials in Kiel Harbour. The submarine experienced equipment failure, and sank to the bottom of a 16-metre hole at the bottom of Kiel Harbour. Bauer escaped by letting in water, thus increasing the air pressure, which allowed Bauer and his two companions to open the hatch and swim to the surface. This was the first submarine escape to be witnessed and reported.

In 1887 the wreck was discovered, and it was raised on 5 July 1887. Brandtaucher was first placed on display at the Naval Academy in Kiel and then in 1906 it was moved to the Museum für Meereskunde in Berlin. From 1963 to 1965 it was restored in the GDR at Rostock, and placed on display at the Nationale Volksarmee Museum in Potsdam. The boat can now be viewed at the Militärhistorisches Museum der Bundeswehr (German Armed Forces Museum of Military History), in Dresden.

== See also ==
- USS Turtle
- USS Alligator (1862)
- CSS Hunley
