= Franklin Island (Antarctica) =

Island in Antarctica

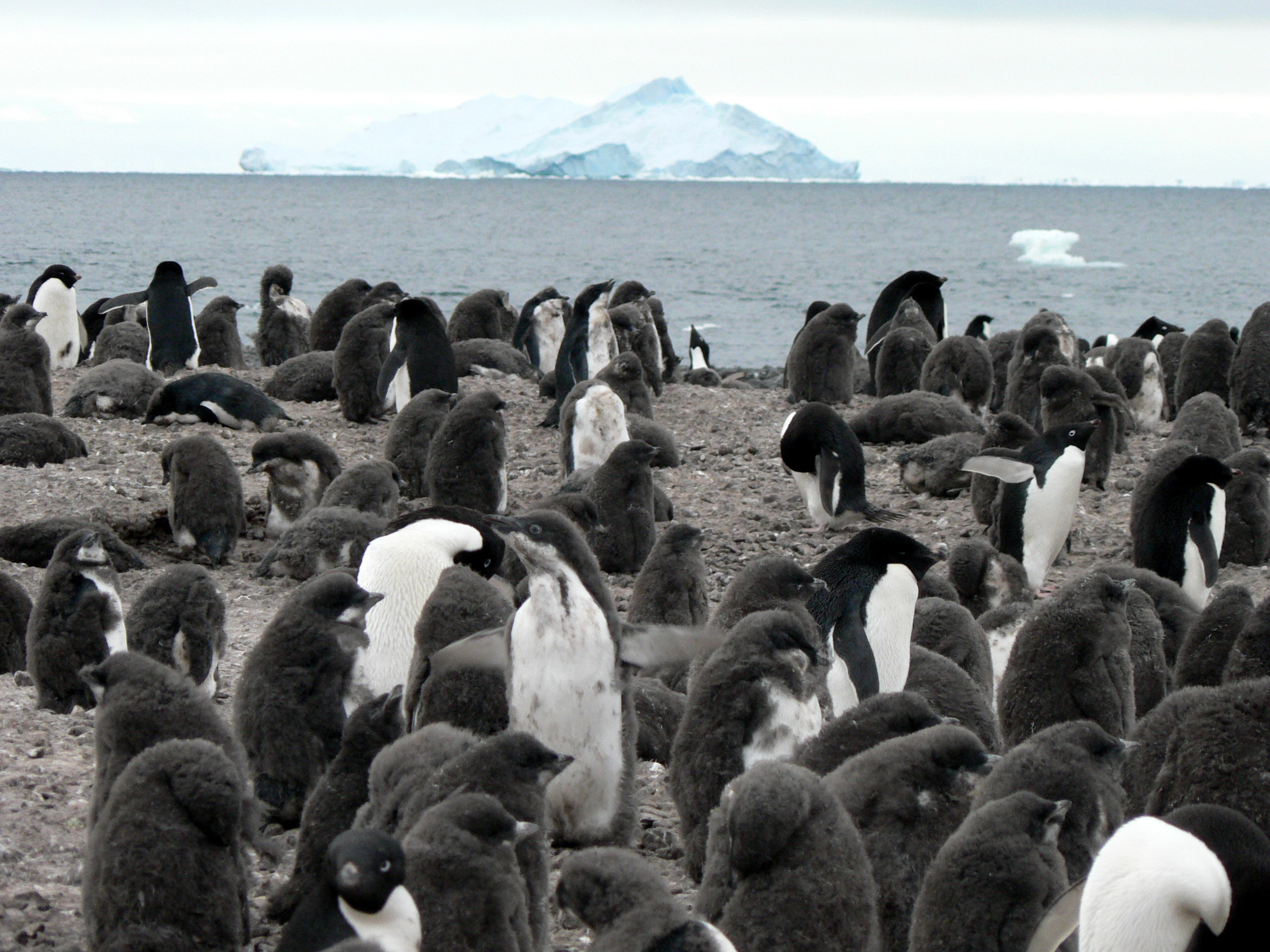

- Location within Antarctica

Geography
- Location: Antarctica
- Coordinates: 76°5′S 168°19′E
- Length: 13 km (8.1 mi)

Franklin Island is an island 7 nautical miles (13 km; 8.1 mi) long, lying in the Ross Sea about 80 nautical miles (150 km; 92 mi) east of Cape Hickey, Victoria Land, Antarctica.

== Exploration and naming ==
Franklin Island was discovered on January 27, 1841 by James Clark Ross, and named for Sir John Franklin, the noted Arctic explorer, who as Governor of Van Diemen's Land (Tasmania) had royally entertained the expedition on its way south at Hobart in 1840.

== Location ==
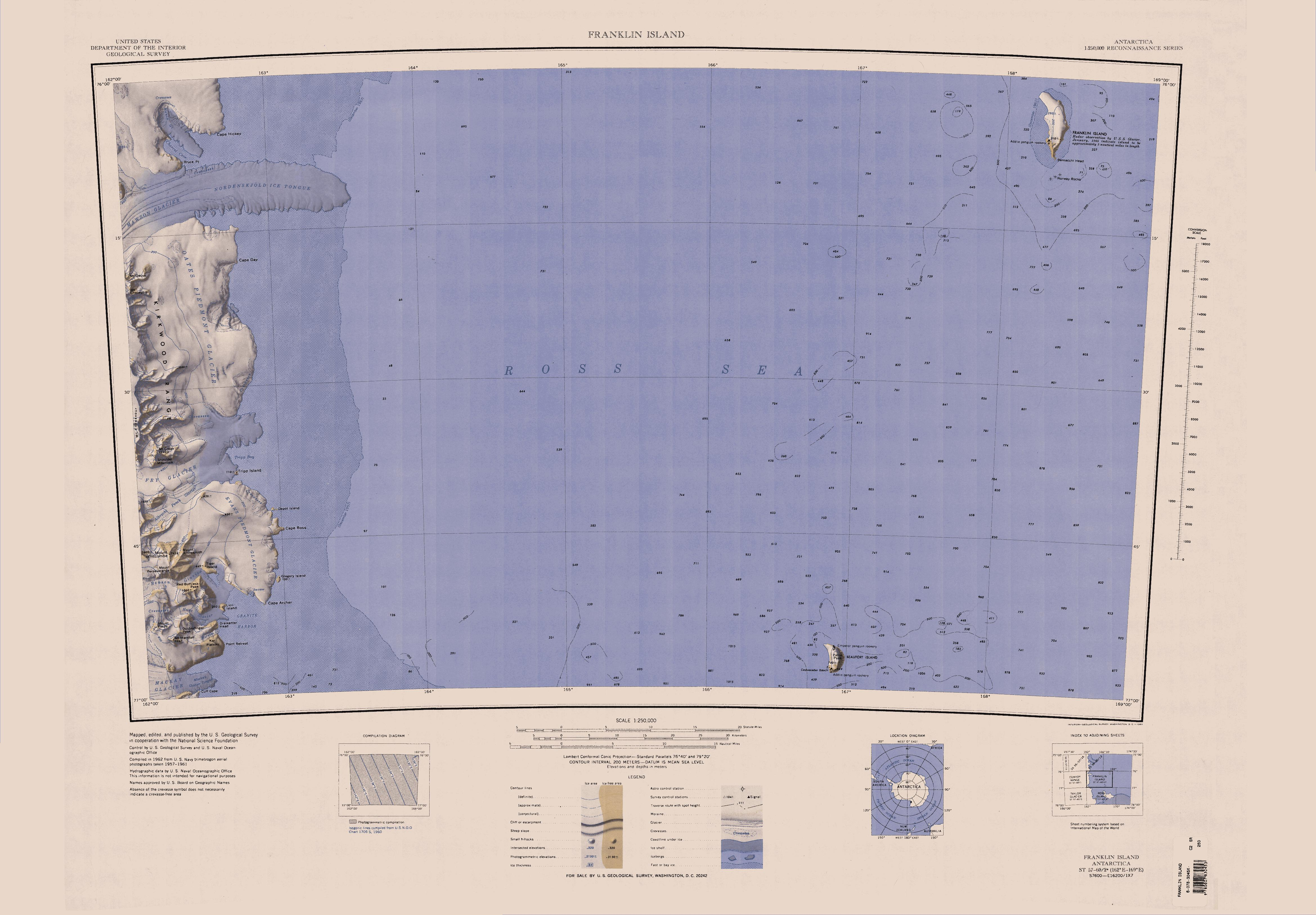
Franklin Island in extreme northeast of map

Though located just 80 kilometres (50 mi) north of Beaufort Island and appearing at first glance to be part of the same group, it is not usually considered to be part of the Ross Archipelago. The island is the eroded remnant of a shield volcano that formed 4.8 +/- 2.0 million years ago, the vent of which is now submerged off the east coast.

Franklin Island is about 290 metres (950 ft) high at its highest point, and about 5 nautical miles (9.3 km; 5.8 mi) long. There is an Adélie penguin rookery on its southwest shore. It terminates in Bernacchi Head in the south. The Norway Rocks are just south of the island.

=== Bernacchi Head ===
76°08′S 168°20′E. A precipitous cliff forming the south extremity of Franklin Island in the Ross Sea. Named "Cape Bernacchi" by the British Antarctic Expedition (1898-1900) for Louis C. Bernacchi, a member of the expedition. The generic has been changed to "Head" by the US-ACAN to avoid duplication with Cape Bernacchi on the coast of Victoria Land.

=== Norway Rocks ===
76°10′S 168°20′E. A reef of rocks, the charted position of which is doubtful, reported to extend about 4 nautical miles (7.4 km; 4.6 mi) southward from Bernacchi Head, Franklin Island, in the Ross Sea. Discovered in 1841 by Ross. Named by C.E. Borchgrevink, a native of Norway, leader of the British Antarctic Expedition, 1898-1900.

== Sources ==
- Alberts, Fred G., ed. (1995), Geographic Names of the Antarctic (PDF) (2 ed.), United States Board on Geographic Names This article incorporates public domain material from websites or documents of the United States Board on Geographic Names.
- Franklin Island, USGS: United States Geological Survey

This article incorporates public domain material from websites or documents of the United States Geological Survey.
