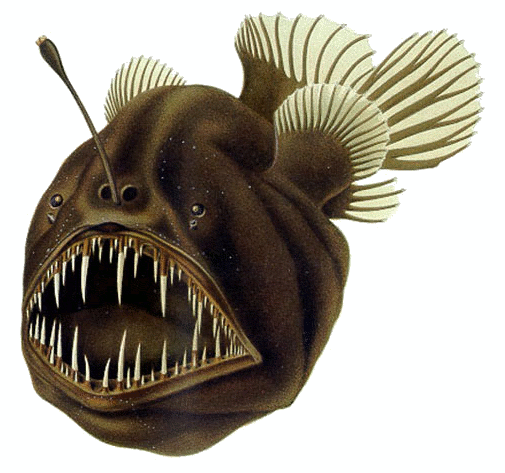
- Humpback anglerfish, Melanocetus johnsonii

Scientific classification
- Kingdom: Animalia
- Phylum: Chordata
- Class: Actinopterygii
- Order: Lophiiformes
- Suborder: Ceratioidei
- Family: Melanocetidae; T. N. Gill, 1879
- Genus: Melanocetus; Günther, 1864

Type species
- Melanocetus johnsonii Günther, 1864

Species
- See text.

= Black seadevil =

Black seadevils

Family of fish

Black seadevils are small, deep-sea lophiiform fish of the family Melanocetidae. The six known species are all within the genus Melanocetus. They are found in tropical to temperate waters of the Atlantic, Indian, and in the Pacific Oceans, as well as one other species endemic to the Ross Sea.

One of several anglerfish families, black seadevils are named for their intimidating appearance and dark skin. The humpback anglerfish (Melanocetus johnsonii) was featured on a 1995 cover of Time magazine and became a flagship species for deep sea fauna.

== Taxonomy ==
The black seadevil family, Melanocetidae, was first proposed as a subfamily in 1878 by the American biologist Theodore Gill. The only genus in the family is Melanocetus, originally proposed as monospecific in 1864 by the German-born British herpetologist and ichthyologist Albert Günther when he described the humpback anglerfish (M. johnsonii). The type locality of M. johnsonii is off Madeira. The 5th edition of Fishes of the World classifies the family Melanocetidae within the sexually dimorphous suborder Ceratioidei of the anglerfish order Lophiiformes.

Both the black seadevil family name, Melanocetidae, and the genus name, Melanocetus, are a combination of melanos meaning "black" and cetus, which means a "large sea creature", typically used to refer to whales. Günther did not explain this choice of name but did note the uniform black colour, including the inside of the mouth of M. johnsonii.

== Species ==
The black seadevil family and its single genus, Melanocetus, has six valid species classified within it. Only two have been assigned common names:

- Melanocetus eustalus Pietsch & Van Duzer, 1980
- Melanocetus johnsonii Günther, 1864 (Humpback anglerfish)
- Melanocetus murrayi Günther, 1887 (Murray's abyssal anglerfish)
- Melanocetus niger Regan, 1925
- Melanocetus polyactis Regan, 1925
- Melanocetus rossi Balushkin & Fedorov, 1981

== Physical description ==
Black seadevils are characterized by a mostly scaleless gelatinous globose body, and large head complemented by large fang-like teeth lining the jaws of a cavernous mouth. These teeth are depressible. Some species have a scattering of epidermal spinules on the body, and the scales (when present) are conical, hollow, and translucent. Like other anglerfishes, black seadevils possess an illicium and esca; the former being a modified dorsal spine—the "fishing rod"—and the latter being the bulbous, bioluminescent "fishing lure". The esca is simple in black seadevils (with either a conical terminus or anterior and posterior ridges in some species), and both it and the illicium are free of denticles.

Black seadevil bioluminescence is produced by symbiotic bacteria; these bacteria are thought to enter the fish's esca via an external duct. In at least two species, the esca is not luminous until this duct develops, suggesting the bacteria originate from the surrounding seawater. The lure is thought to both attract food and conspecifics.

The eyes of black seadevils are small; the pupil is larger than the lens, leaving an aphakic space. Melanocetids, like most deep-sea anglerfish, have high sexual dimorphism: while females may reach a length of 18 cm (7.1 in) or more, males remain under 3 cm (1.2 in). Male seadevils lack both lures and teeth. Females have large, distensible stomachs which give the ventral region a flabby appearance.

Pelvic fins are absent in both sexes. All fins are rounded with slightly incised membranes; the pectoral fins are small. The single dorsal fin is positioned far back from the head, larger than and above the retrorse anal fin. In life, black seadevils are a dark brown to black. The skin is extremely soft and easily abraded during collection or even by simple handling.

== Life history ==
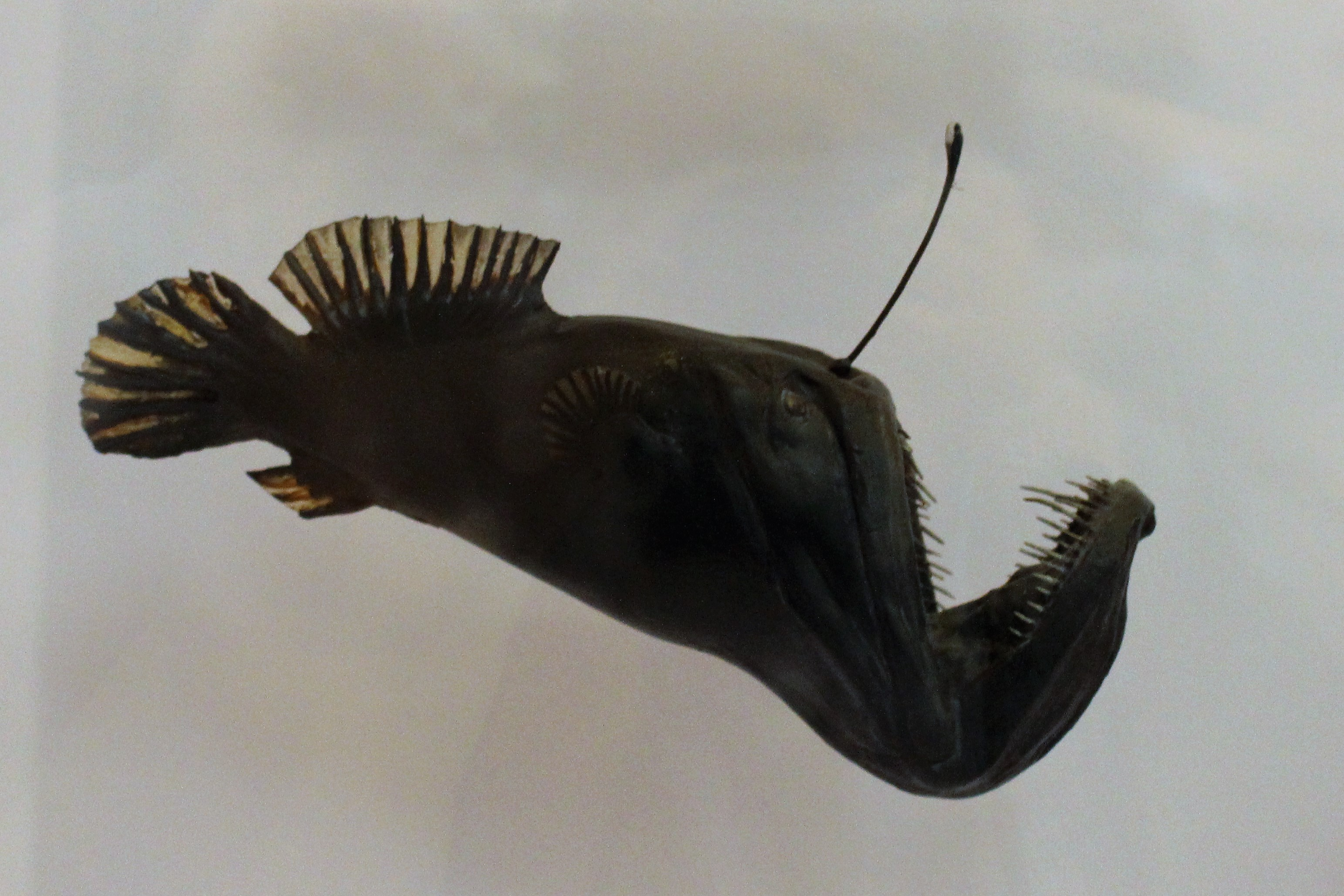
Melanocetus johnsonii model before a meal.

=== Reproduction ===
Male Melanocetidae, while dwarfed, are unlike all other ceratioid families. Males are free-living rather than parasitic. Instead, Melanocetus johnsonii males have been observed to grip females with their jaws, creating a loose attachment (rather than fusion).

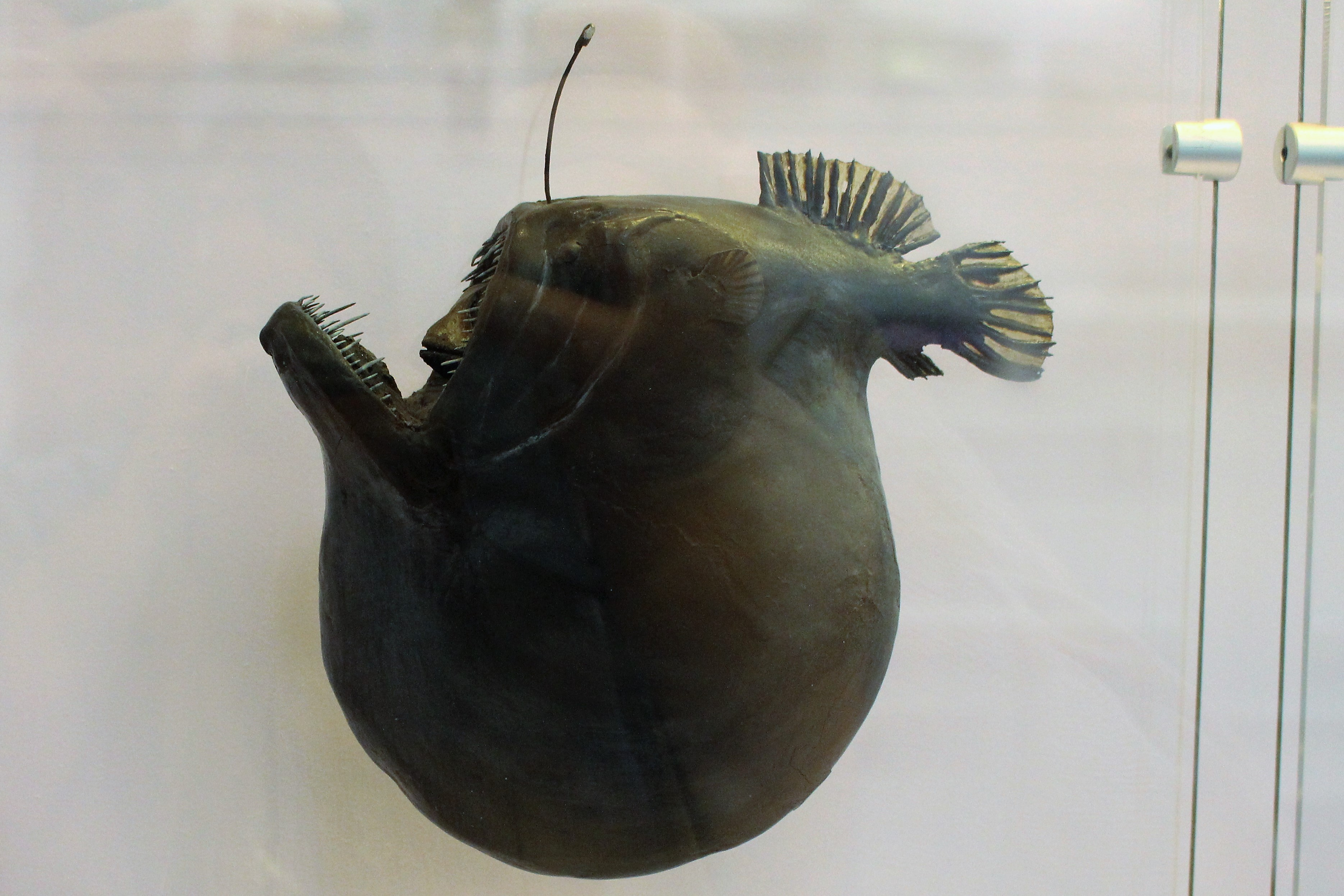
Melanocetus johnsonii model after a meal.

Little is known about reproduction, but it has been theorized eggs are fertilized externally. Melanocetidae females are oviparous, releasing eggs on gelatinous rafts.

=== Feeding ===
Female black seadevils utilize their bioluminescent esca as a lure for prey. Given the limited food availability in the deep sea, deep-sea anglerfish have evolved to sit and wait for their prey as opposed to utilizing energy for active hunting.

The typical diet of deep-sea anglerfish includes invertebrates, cephalopods, and crustaceans. Additionally, deep-sea anglerfish have an extremely extensible pharynx and stomach, allowing them to swallow large prey.

=== Locomotion ===
Anglerfish spend a majority of their time in a passive, drifting state, but have been observed in limited laboratory observations to also utilize their pectoral fins ~25% of the time.

=== Distribution ===
M. johnsonii is most often collected between 500 and 1,500 m (1,600 and 4,900 ft); however, footage has only been captured of the black seadevil at 580 m (1,900 ft). Larvae are primarily found in the ocean's upper 200 m (660 ft), sinking once they reach sexual maturity.

The anglerfish is found in the Atlantic, Pacific, and Indian oceans.

== Observation and research ==
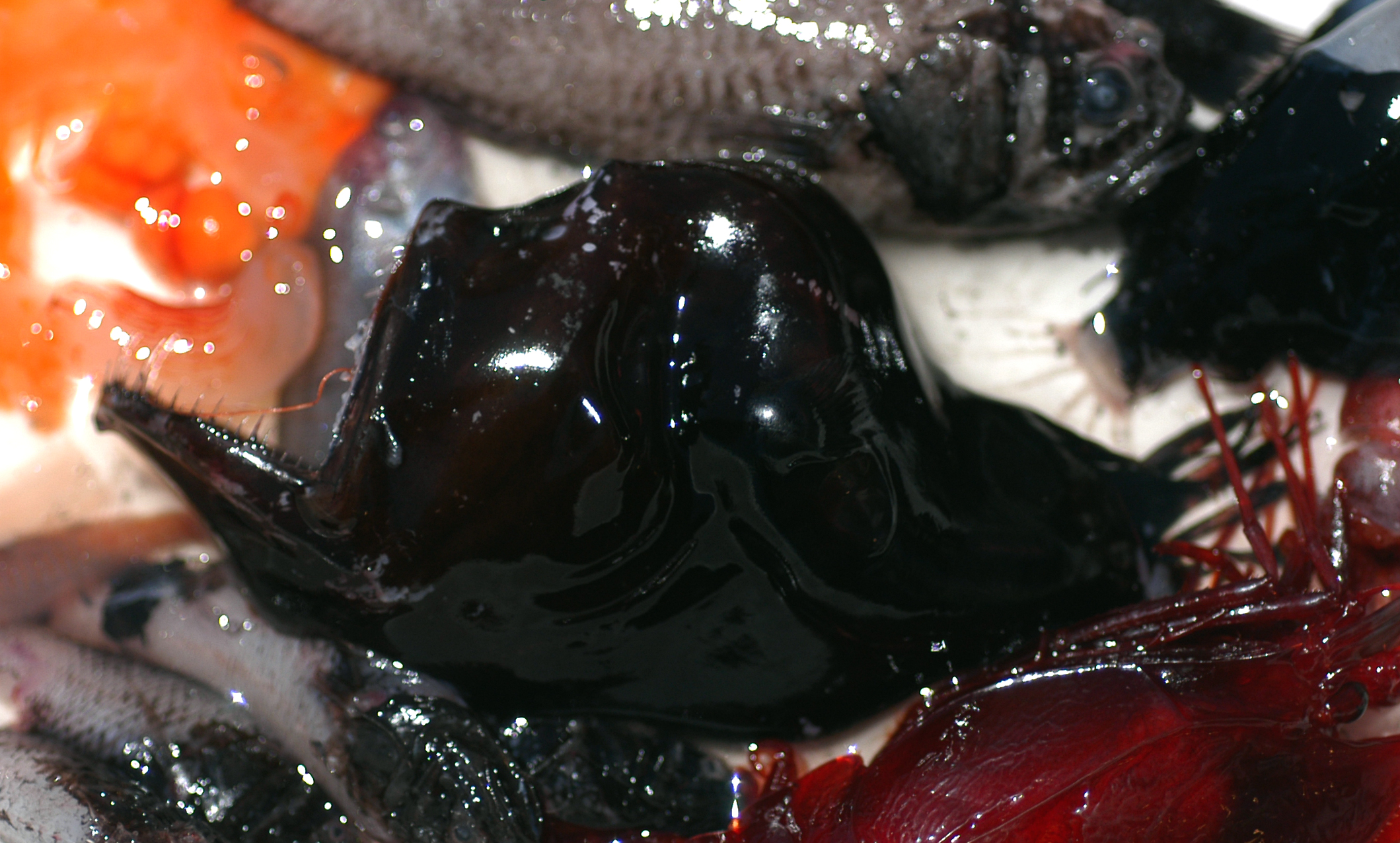
Melanocetus johnsonii collected by NOAA Ship Delaware II in 2004.

There are limited observations of the black seadevil at depth; thus, conclusions on its behavior and ecology is primarily sourced from individual specimens who survived collection or capture from the deep sea. These individuals rarely survive long enough for sustained observation.

Black seadevils have only been filmed twice: once by Bruce Robison of Monterey Bay Aquarium Research Institute, in the Monterey Canyon at 600 m (2,000 ft) via a remote-operated diving vehicle in 2014, and again in 2025, by a team of researchers onboard the vessel Glaucus, who recorded a humpback anglerfish making its way to the ocean's surface off the coast of the Canary Islands.
