= List of ghost towns in Nunavut =

The following is a list of known abandoned communities in Nunavut, Canada.

- Amadjuak
- Brooman Point Village
- Craig Harbour
- Dundas Harbour
- Fort Ross
- Iglunga
- Killiniq
- Native Point
- Port Leopold
- Qatiktalik
- Tavani
- Umingmaktok

== See also ==
- List of communities in Nunavut
- Census divisions of Nunavut
- Qikiqtaaluk, Unorganized
