= Qikiqtaaluk, Unorganized =

Unorganized area of Nunavut, Canada

Qikiqtaaluk, Unorganized in Nunavut, Canada, is part of a larger census division known as the Qikiqtaaluk Region. This area covers the whole Qikiqtaaluk Region outside the 13 communities such as Iqaluit, Resolute or Grise Fiord. Qikiqtaaluk has a rocky mountainous landscape. Prior to the 2021 Canadian census it was known as Baffin.

Included in the area are the weather station at Eureka and the Canadian Forces base at Alert (CFS Alert).

It is Canada's largest census subdivision in terms of area.

== 2021 demographics ==
2021 Canadian census

- Population (2021): 0
- Population change (2016–2021): N/A
- Private dwellings: 0
- Area: 968,988.38 km^{2} (374,128.51 sq mi)
- Density: 0

== Named places ==
Named places listed in 2021 by Statistics Canada are:

- Achiwapaschikisit^{A}
- Akulivik^{A}
- Alert
- Alexandra Fiord
- Amadjuak
- Askwasimwakwanan^{A}
- Baffin, Unorganized
- Cape Dyer
- Cape Smith
- Charlton Depot
- Craig Harbour
- Dundas Harbour
- Fort Conger
- Hazen Camp
- Ikaaqtalik
- Inuksualuuk^{A}
- Ipiutaq^{A}
- Irqatarvik^{A}
- Isachsen
- Kekerten
- Killiniq
- Kipisa
- Kivitoo
- Mikwasiskwaw Umitukap Aytakunich^{A}
- Naparutalik^{A}
- Nottingham Island
- Nunavut
- Nuwata
- Padloping Island
- Polaris
- Port Burwell
- Qajalinga
- Qikiqtaaluk
- Qikiqtaaluk, Unorganized
- Quanatulik^{A}
- Resolution Island
- Tanquary Camp
- Tuniit
- Wimin^{A}

^A According to Natural Resources Canada, through the Geographical Names Board of Canada (GeoBase) the location is in Quebec

Other places not listed by Statistics Canada include:

- Brooman Point Village
- Iglunga
- Port Leopold
