= List of communities in Nunavut =

Communities in Canada's provinces and territories

This is a list of communities in Nunavut, Canada. Many of these communities have alternate names or spellings in Inuktitut or Inuinnaqtun, while others are primarily known by their Inuktitut or Inuinnaqtun names. As of the 2016 census the population of Nunavut was 35,944, an increase of 12.66% from the 2011 census.

== Communities ==
The following are communities recognised by the Government of Nunavut.

Communities of Nunavut

Community	Inuktitut/Inuinnaqtun	Inuktitut syllabics	Translation	Region	2021 Canadian census			Location
Community	Inuktitut/Inuinnaqtun	Inuktitut syllabics	Translation	Region	2021	2016	% change	Location
Arctic Bay	Ikpiarjuk	ᐃᒃᐱᐊᕐᔪᒃ	the pocket	Qikiqtaaluk Region	994	868	+14.5	73°02′11″N 085°09′09″W
Arviat		ᐊᕐᕕᐊᑦ	bowhead whale	Kivalliq Region	2,864	2,657	+7.8	61°06′29″N 094°03′25″W
Baker Lake	Qamani’tuaq	ᖃᒪᓂᑦᑐᐊᖅ	big lake joined by a river at both ends	Kivalliq Region	2,061	2,069	-0.4	64°19′05″N 096°01′03″W
Bathurst Inlet^{c}	Qingaut	ᕿᙵᐅᓐ	the nose	Kitikmeot Region	0	0	N/A	66°50′00″N 108°02′00″W
Cambridge Bay	Iqaluktuuttiaq	ᐃᖃᓗᒃᑑᑦᑎᐊᖅ	a good place with many fish	Kitikmeot Region	1,760	1,766	-0.3	69°07′02″N 105°03′11″W
Chesterfield Inlet	Igluligaarjuk	ᐃᒡᓗᓕᒑᕐᔪᒃ	place with a few igloos (houses)	Kivalliq Region	397	437	-9.2	63°20′27″N 090°42′22″W
Clyde River	Kangiqtugaapik	ᑲᖏᖅᑐᒑᐱᒃ	nice little inlet	Qikiqtaaluk Region	1,181	1,053	+12.2	70°28′26″N 068°35′10″W
Coral Harbour	Salliq	ᓴᓪᓖᑦ	a large, flat island in front of the mainland	Kivalliq Region	1,035	891	+16.2	64°08′13″N 083°09′51″W
Gjoa Haven	Uqsuqtuuq	ᐅᖅᓱᖅᑑᖅ	place of plenty of fat (blubber)	Kitikmeot Region	1,349	1,324	+1.9	68°37′33″N 095°52′30″W
Grise Fiord	Aujuittuq	ᐊᐅᔪᐃᑦᑐᖅ	place that never thaws	Qikiqtaaluk Region	144	129	+11.6	76°25′03″N 082°53′38″W
Igloolik	Iglulik	ᐃᒡᓗᓕᒃ	place of iglus^{a}	Qikiqtaaluk Region	2,049	1,744	+17.5	69°22′34″N 081°47′58″W
Iqaluit (capital)		ᐃᖃᓗᐃᑦ	place of many fish	Qikiqtaaluk Region	7,429	7,740	-4.0	63°44′55″N 068°31′11″W
Kimmirut		ᑭᒻᒥᕈᑦ	looks like a heel	Qikiqtaaluk Region	426	386	+9.5	62°50′48″N 069°52′07″W
Kinngait		ᑭᙵᐃᑦ	high mountain	Qikiqtaaluk Region	1,396	1,441	-3.1	64°13′54″N 076°32′25″W
Kugaaruk	Arviligjuaq	ᑰᒑᕐᔪᒃ or ᐊᕐᕕᓕᒡᔪᐊᖅ	place of many bowhead whales (Arviligjuaq), little stream (Kugaaruk)	Kitikmeot Region	1,033	933	+10.7	68°31′59″N 089°49′36″W
Kugluktuk	Qurluqtuq	ᖁᕐᓗᖅᑐᖅ	Place of moving water	Kitikmeot Region	1,382	1,491	-7.3	67°49′32″N 115°05′42″W
Nanisivik^{c}		ᓇᓂᓯᕕᒃ	the place where people find things	Qikiqtaaluk Region	0	0	N/A	73°02′05″N 084°32′13″W
Naujaat		ᓇᐅᔮᑦ	nesting place for seagulls	Kivalliq Region	1,225	1,082	+13.2	66°31′19″N 086°14′06″W
Pangnirtung	Pangniqtuuq	ᐸᖕᓂᖅᑑᖅ	place of the bull caribou	Qikiqtaaluk Region	1,504	1,481	+1.6	66°08′52″N 065°41′58″W
Pond Inlet	Mittimatalik	ᒥᑦᑎᒪᑕᓕᒃ	place where Mittiima is buried	Qikiqtaaluk Region	1,555	1,617	-3.8	72°41′57″N 077°57′33″W
Qikiqtarjuaq		ᕿᑭᖅᑕᕐᔪᐊᖅ	big island	Qikiqtaaluk Region	593	598	-0.8	67°33′29″N 064°01′29″W
Rankin Inlet	Kangiqtiniq	ᑲᖏᕿᓂᖅ or ᑲᖏᖅᖠᓂᖅ	deep bay/inlet	Kivalliq Region	2,975	2,842	+4.7	62°48′35″N 092°05′58″W
Resolute	Qausuittuq	ᖃᐅᓱᐃᑦᑐᖅ	place with no dawn	Qikiqtaaluk Region	183	198	-7.6	74°41′51″N 094°49′56″W
Sanikiluaq		ᓴᓂᑭᓗᐊᖅ	named for a man known as a fast runner	Qikiqtaaluk Region	1,010	882	+14.5	56°32′34″N 079°13′30″W
Sanirajak		ᓴᓂᕋᔭᒃ	one that is along the coast	Qikiqtaaluk Region	891	848	+5.1	68°46′38″N 081°13′27″W
Taloyoak	Talurjuaq	ᑕᓗᕐᔪᐊᕐᒃ	large stone caribou blind	Kitikmeot Region	934	1,029	-9.2	69°32′13″N 093°31′36″W
Umingmaktok^{c}	Umingmaktuuq	ᐅᒥᖕᒪᒃᑑᖅ	they caught a muskox	Kitikmeot Region	0	0	N/A	67°41′56″N 107°55′27″W
Whale Cove	Tikirarjuaq	ᑎᑭᕋᕐᔪᐊᖅ	long point	Kivalliq Region	470	435	+8.0	62°10′22″N 092°34′46″W

== Former communities ==
- Amadjuak, on Baffin Island
- Brooman Point Village, on Bathurst Island
- Craig Harbour, on Ellesmere Island
- Dundas Harbour, on Devon Island
- Ennadai, on the mainland
- Iglunga, on an island off Baffin Island
- Killiniq (Port Burwell), on Killiniq Island
- Native Point, on the peninsula of the same name
- Nuwata, on Baffin Island
- Padlei, on the mainland
- Port Leopold, on Somerset Island
- Tavani, on the mainland

== Notes ==
- ^aiglu meaning house and refers to the sod houses that were originally in the area.
- ^bPart of the Hope Bay greenstone belt and are operated by Newmont Mining Corporation
- ^cNeither Bathurst Inlet, Nanisivik or Umingmaktok are listed as an official community by the Government of Nunavut, but are listed as settlements by Statistics Canada.
