= Stratton Inlet =

Body of water in Nunavut, Canada

Coordinates: 74°31′59″N 086°40′00″W

Stratton Inlet is a body of water in the Qikiqtaaluk Region of Nunavut, Canada.

== Location ==
It lies off the southern coast of Devon Island. Like Hobhouse Inlet, Burnett Inlet, Powell Inlet, and Cuming Inlet, Stratton Inlet is situated between Maxwell Bay and Croker Bay, in the eastern high Arctic, north of Lancaster Sound and Barrow Strait.

== History ==
Evidence of Thule culture has been found here.
