= Cuming Inlet =

Body of water in Nunavut, Canada

Coordinates: 74°34′59″N 085°00′00″W

Cuming Inlet is a body of water in the Qikiqtaaluk Region of Nunavut, Canada. It lies off the southern coast of Devon Island in the eastern high Arctic. Like Stratton Inlet, Burnett Inlet, Hobhouse Inlet, and Powell Inlet, Cuming Inlet is situated between Maxwell Bay and Croker Bay, north of Lancaster Sound and Barrow Strait.

It was named by William Edward Parry in honor of Francis Brooking Cuming.
