= Powell Inlet =

Body of water in Nunavut, Canada

Coordinates: 74°34′59″N 085°28′00″W

Powell Inlet is a body of water in the Qikiqtaaluk Region of Nunavut, Canada. It lies off the southern coast of Devon Island in the eastern high Arctic. Like Stratton Inlet, Burnett Inlet, Hobhouse Inlet, and Cuming Inlet, Powell Inlet is situated between Maxwell Bay and Croker Bay, north of Lancaster Sound and Barrow Strait.

Powell Inlet is 12 mi (19 km) long.
