= Burnett Inlet =

Body of water in Nunavut, Canada

Coordinates: 74°31′59″N 86°11′59″W

Burnett Inlet is a body of water in the Qikiqtaaluk Region of Nunavut, Canada. It lies off the southern coast of Devon Island. Like Stratton Inlet, Hobhouse Inlet, Powell Inlet, and Cuming Inlet, Burnett Inlet is situated between Maxwell Bay and Croker Bay, in the eastern high Arctic, north of Lancaster Sound and Barrow Strait.

Its width averages 2 mi (3.2 km).
