= Hobhouse Inlet =

Body of water in Nunavut, Canada

Coordinates: 74°28′N 087°02′W

Hobhouse Inlet is a body of water in the Qikiqtaaluk Region of Nunavut, Canada. It lies off the southern coast of Devon Island. Like Stratton Inlet, Burnett Inlet, Powell Inlet, and Cuming Inlet, Hobhouse is situated between Maxwell Bay and Croker Bay, in the eastern high Arctic, north of Lancaster Sound and Barrow Strait.

The inlet is named in honour of Sir Benjamin Hobhouse.

== Fauna ==
The Hobhouse Inlet is a Canadian Important Bird Area (#NU060), a Key Migratory Terrestrial Bird Site, and an International Biological Program Site (Region 9, #2-16). Notable bird species include the northern fulmar and colonial waterbirds and seabirds.
