= Akpaqarvik Migratory Bird Sanctuary =

Migratory bird sanctuary in Nunavut, Canada

- Prince Leopold Island Migratory Bird Sanctuary
- IUCN category IV (habitat/species management area)
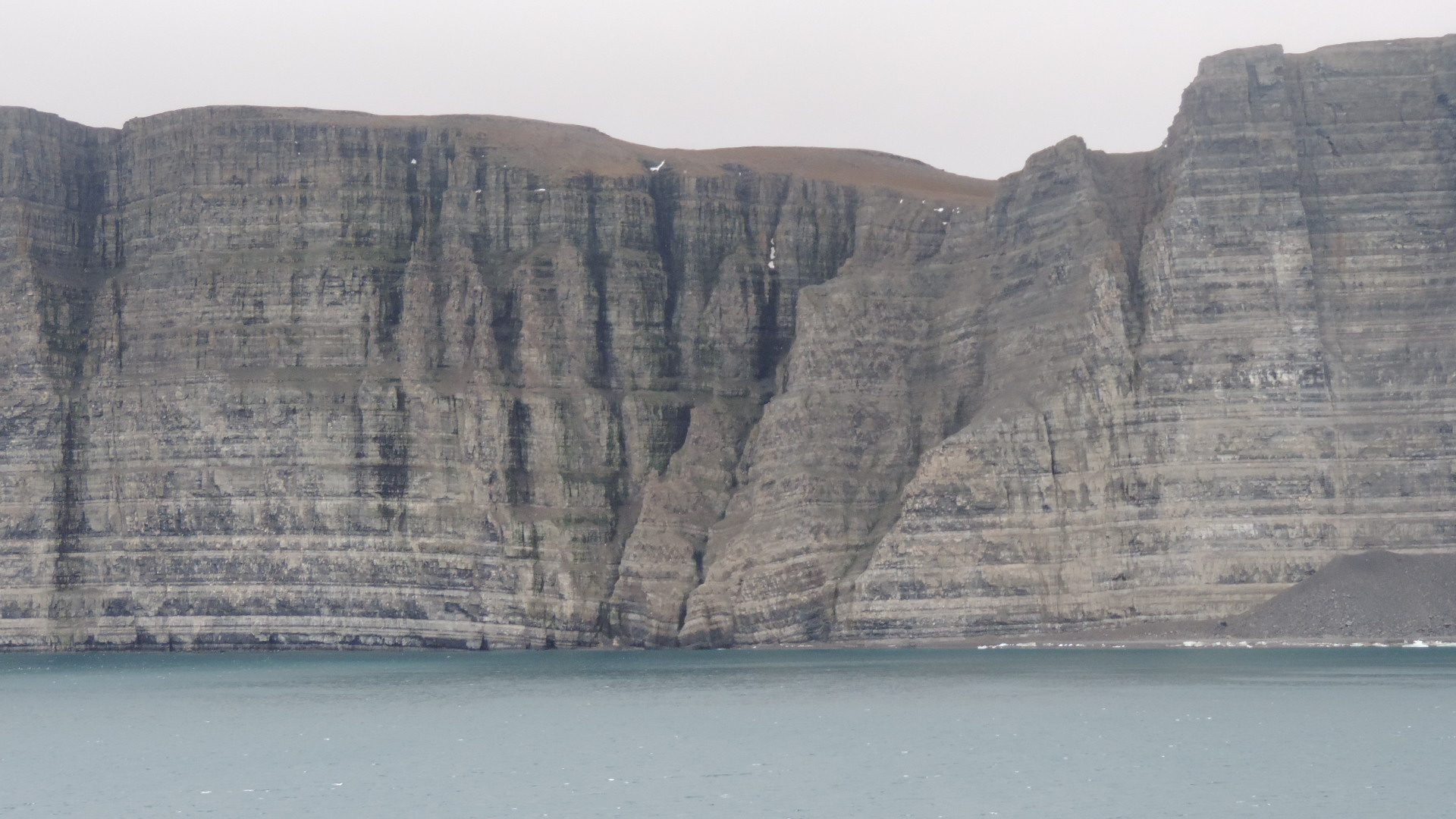
- Cliffs along the south-west face of Prince Leopold Island, September 2019

- Location within Nunavut Location within Canada
- Location: Prince Leopold Island, Qikiqtaaluk, Nunavut, Canada
- Nearest city: Port Leopold (abandoned)
- Coordinates: 74°02′N 90°00′W
- Area: 30,600 ha (76,000 acres)
- Established: 1992
- Governing body: Environment and Climate Change Canada
- Website: Akpaqarvik Migratory Bird Sanctuary

The Akpaqarvik Migratory Bird Sanctuary, formerly Prince Leopold Island Migratory Bird Sanctuary, is a migratory bird sanctuary in the Qikiqtaaluk, Nunavut, Canada. It is located on Prince Leopold Island within Lancaster Sound at the junction of Prince Regent Inlet and Barrow Strait. It was established in 1992 and is classified Category IV by the International Union for Conservation of Nature. It is 30,600 ha (76,000 acres), with 24,000 ha (59,000 acres) marine habitat, in size, and has a flat, rocky surface with vertical exposed sedimentary rock cliffs nearly all the way around the island.

== Other designations ==
The island is a Key Migratory Bird Terrestrial Habitat site (NU Site 15) and is classified as a Canadian Important Bird Area (#NU006). The MBS is situated within the IBA.
