= The Aviators of Hudson Strait =

- Screenshot: Title frame
- Written by: William Weintraub
- Produced by: William Weintraub
- Cinematography: George H. Valiquette
- Edited by: Marion Meadows
- Production company: National Film Board of Canada
- Distributed by: Department of National Defence (Canada)
- Release date: 1973
- Running time: 28 min., 20 sec.
- Country: Canada
- Language: English

The Aviators of Hudson Strait is a 1973 Canadian short documentary film produced by the National Film Board of Canada (NFB) for the Canadian Department of National Defence.

== Synopsis ==
In 1927, a railway was being built through northern Manitoba in order to ship grain from the Prairies to Europe via Hudson Bay. In that year, N. B. McLean, a Department of Marine and Fisheries official, led an expedition to Ungava Bay and Hudson Strait to undertake an aerial survey of the strait to study ice conditions and determine how long the annual navigation season might be for ocean-going freighters.

Royal Canadian Air Force Squadron Leader Thomas A. Lawrence, in charge of air operations for the 1927-28 expedition, was responsible for the six RCAF pilots and their six Fokker Universal aircraft. A total of 44 men, 22 being military personnel, made up the group of mechanics, riggers, wireless engineers, storekeepers, cooks and doctors, essentially every trade needed for a major Arctic expedition.

From Halifax, Nova Scotia, the expedition set out on July 17, 1927, on the CGS Stanley icebreaker, accompanied by the supply ship S.S. Larch, carrying 25 tons of general cargo and 27 tons of coal. Their first stop was Port Burwell, where men and supplies were dropped off to set up an outpost. Two other posts were set up on Nottingham Island and at Wakeham Bay. At each location, prefabricated buildings were constructed that included barracks for housing, storehouses, a radio shack and hangars for the aircraft.

The challenges of flying in Arctic conditions meant that the Fokker Universals flew on pontoons during the short spring and summer, and then converted to skis for the fall and winter months. Constant attention to snowdrifts that might trap the men and equipment and keeping runways and waterways clear meant that in the 14-month operation proceeded slowly.

One of the main advantages was the use of Inuit supplies of parkas and clothing that were much better suited to the Arctic than regulation clothing provided by the RCAF. (Note: Throughout the film, Inuit are referred to as "Eskimos".) Inuit hunters also acted as guides and accompanied the pilot and mechanic (who also acted as a photographer) aboard each aircraft. The Inuit guides proved particularly important when one aircraft went down on an ice floe, and the crew only managed to get back safely after a 13-day ordeal by following the guidance of the Inuk hunter, who was able to provide not only food but shelter for the trek.

When the expedition completed its work, over 2,000 photographs had been taken of the region in the course of 227 patrols. The work of the aviators provided invaluable information needed to ensure the future of navigation in Hudson Strait.

== Production ==
The 1927-28 Arctic expedition to Ungava Bay and Hudson Strait was documented by the RCAF, with the film footage providing the basis of the NFB documentary film. The technical advisor was retired Air Vice-Marshal Thomas A. Lawrence, who provided his personal recollections and acted as a narrator for many key sequences.

== Reception ==
The Aviators of Hudson Strait was released as part of the NFB Video collection In Celebration of Nunavut - Charting the North - Volume 7. This video collection consists of nine videos chronicling the efforts to explore and map the Arctic. The films describe land, air and even under water developments. Volume 7 also includes Across Arctic Ungava (1949), a 19 min. first-person account of a 1949 canoe journey from Fort Chimo (now Kuujuaq) to Povungnituk, by four pioneering scientists and their four native guides (from southern Quebec).
