= Hector Island =

Island in Nunavut, Canada

- Location within Nunavut Location within Canada

Geography
- Location: Hudson Strait
- Coordinates: 63°38′59″N 072°2′00″W
- Archipelago: Arctic Archipelago
- Area: 16 km^{2} (6.2 sq mi)

Administration
- Canada
- Nunavut: Nunavut
- Region: Qikiqtaaluk

Demographics
- Population: Uninhabited

Hector Island is an uninhabited Canadian arctic island located in Hudson Strait. It is a Baffin Island offshore island in Nunavut's Qikiqtaaluk Region.

Amadjuak, an Inuit settlement, is 44.5 km (27.7 mi) to the north.
