= Bush Island (Nunavut) =

Island in Nunavut, Canada

- Location within Nunavut Location within Canada

Geography
- Location: Hudson Strait
- Coordinates: 60°29′N 64°43′W
- Archipelago: Arctic Archipelago
- Highest elevation: 152 m (499 ft)

Administration
- Canada
- Nunavut: Nunavut
- Region: Qikiqtaaluk

Demographics
- Population: Uninhabited
- Source: Bush Island at the Atlas of Canada

Bush Island is a small, remote island in the Qikiqtaaluk Region of Nunavut, Canada. It is located in Hudson Strait, 9.5 mi (15.3 km) off the north end of Killiniq Island, separated by Port Harvey, a small bay. It measures 2.5 mi (4.0 km) long and 1.2 mi (1.9 km) wide. The elevation is approximately 152 m (499 ft) above sea level.

Perrett Island, Hettash Island, and Flat Island, lie off the west end of Bush Island, separated by Lenz Strait. Two island groups are close by, including the Knight Islands at 13.5 mi (21.7 km) away, and the Cape Chidley Islands at 16.1 mi (25.9 km) away.
