= Nakoaiyet Islands =

Island group in Nunavut, Canada

- Location within Nunavut Location within Canada

Geography
- Location: Ungava Bay
- Coordinates: 58°24′55″N 67°28′30″W

Administration
- Canada
- Nunavut: Nunavut
- Region: Qikiqtaaluk

Demographics
- Population: Uninhabited
- Source: Nakoaiyet Islands at Atlas of Canada

The Nakoaiyet Islands are an uninhabited island group located northeast of Qikirtajuaq Island in Ungava Bay, in Qikiqtaaluk Region within the Canadian territory of Nunavut.
