= Port Burwell =

Port Burwell may refer to:

- Port Burwell, Ontario, Canada
- Port Burwell, Nunavut, Canada
