= Tu Rocks =

Rock formation in the South Shetland Islands

- Rock outcrops
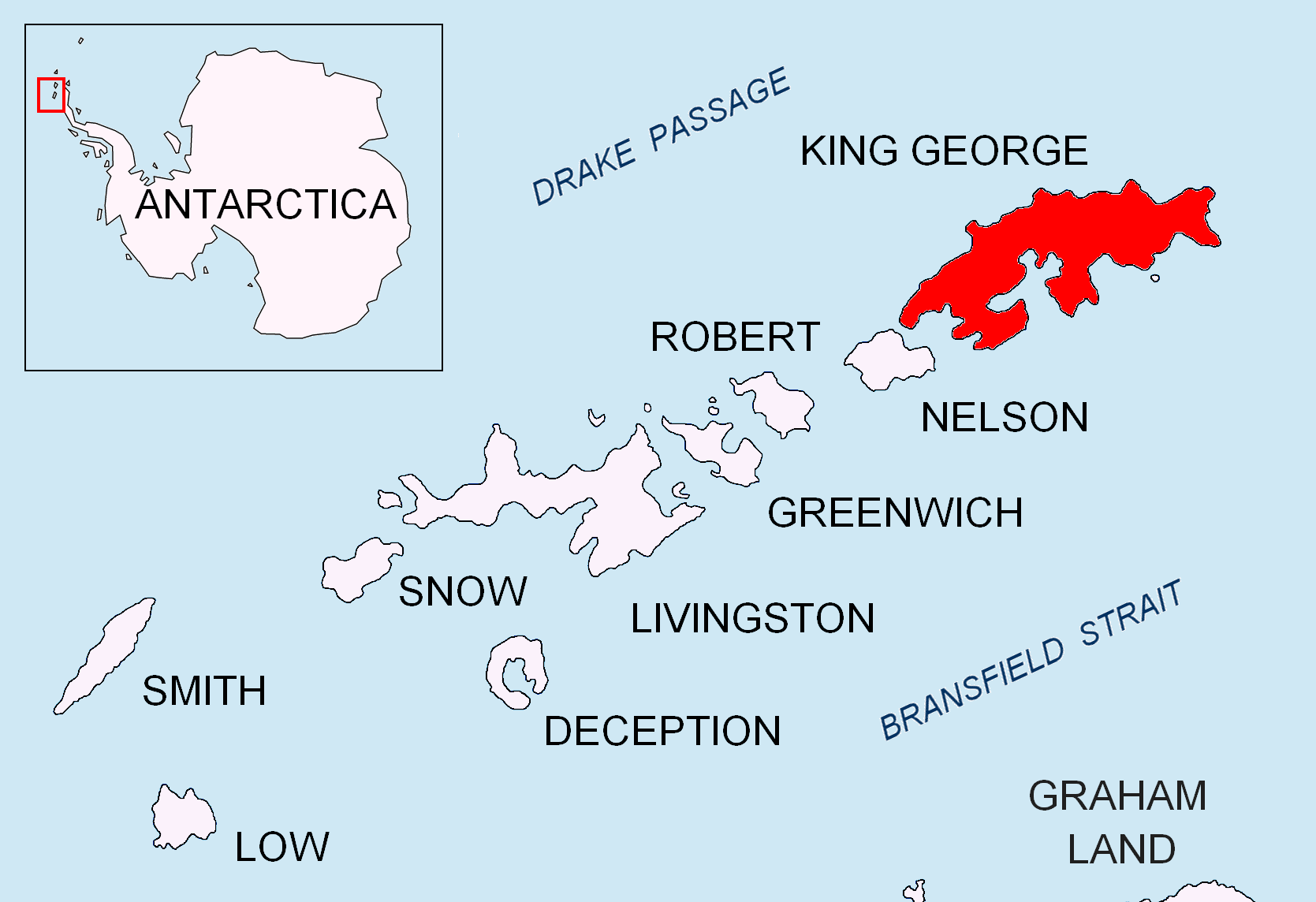
- Location of King George Island (South Shetland Islands)
- Interactive map of Tu Rocks
- Coordinates: 62°14′00″S 58°53′00″W
- Location: Antarctica
- Operator: Antarctic Treaty System

Tu Rocks are two low rocks lying in Maxwell Bay 2 nautical miles (3.7 km; 2.3 mi) east of the southwest end of King George Island, in the South Shetland Islands. The name appears to have been given by DI personnel on the Discovery II who charted the rocks in 1935. Tu is apparently phonetic for two.
