= Bush Island =

Bush Island may refer to:

- Bush Island (Nunavut), in northern Canada
- Bush Island (Nova Scotia), in eastern Canada
- Bush Island, County Down, Northern Ireland; see List of townlands in County Down
