= Cape Chidley Islands =

Archipelago in Nunavut, Canada

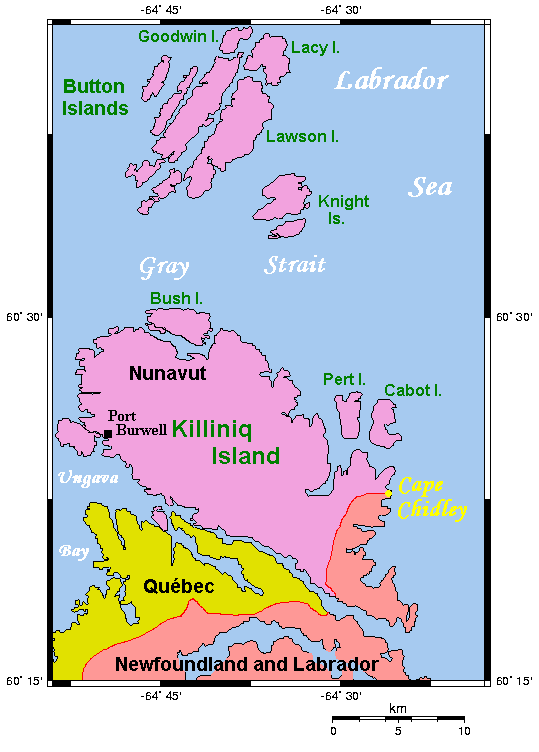
- Cape Chidley Islands area

- Location within Nunavut Location within Canada

Geography
- Location: Labrador Sea
- Coordinates: 60°25′45″N 64°27′50″W
- Archipelago: Arctic Archipelago
- Area: 10 km^{2} (3.9 sq mi)
- Highest point: 401 m (1,316 ft)

Administration
- Canada
- Nunavut: Nunavut
- Region: Qikiqtaaluk

Demographics
- Population: Uninhabited
- Source: Cape Chidley Islands at the Atlas of Canada

The Cape Chidley Islands are members of the Arctic Archipelago in the territory of Nunavut. They are located in the Labrador Sea at the south end of the entrance to the Hudson Strait, north of Killiniq Island's Cape Chidley, and separated from Killiniq Island by the MacGregor Strait.

Cabot Island is the eastern of the two islands and is 2 mi (3.2 km) long. It has two summits, the northern one being 401 m (1,316 ft) above sea level, and the southern one being 325 m (1,066 ft) high.

Pert Island is the smaller of the two islands and is located 0.5 mi (0.80 km) mile to the west. Its highest point is 385 m (1,263 ft) above sea level. Port Burwell lies 20 km (12 mi) west of Pert Island.

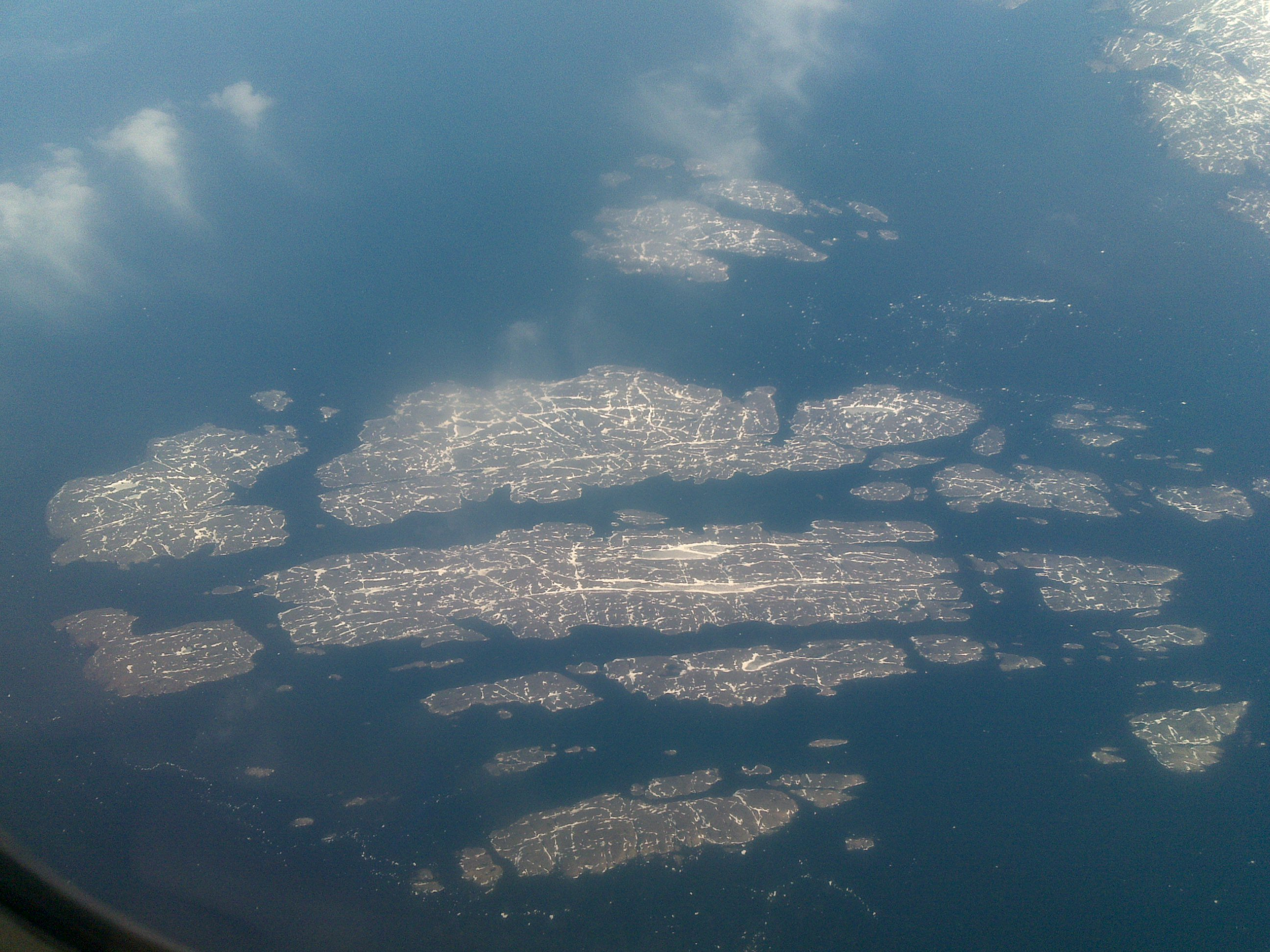
Button Islands, in July. The viewers angle is from north-west towards south-east. Killiniq Island is barely visible in the upper right corner. The Cape Chidley Islands are just off the photo beyond Knight Island
