= Flat Island (Nunavut) =

Uninhabited island in Nunavut, Canada

Coordinates: 60°29′01″N 64°51′55″W

Flat Island is an uninhabited island in the Qikiqtaaluk Region of Nunavut, Canada. Located in the Hudson Strait, it is one of the largest islands lying off the west end of Bush Island. The two islands are separated from each other by Lenz Strait. Hettash and Perrett islands are nearby.
