= Taqpangajuk =

Coordinates: 60°05′30″N 65°04′00″W

Taqpangajuk was an attempted Inuit resettlement located at Singer Inlet, 40 kilometres (25 mi) southwest of Killiniq in Quebec, northeastern Canada. The settlement was created in the 1980s as part of a relocation program from Killiniq. Its forecast population in 2010 was 432 people. In the winter of 1987, several displaced Killiniq families established a new community at Taqpangajuk without government assistance. However, the settlement failed, because of a lack of services and education, making it too difficult.
