= Cape Chidley =

Cape on Killiniq Island, Canada

Cape Chidley Cape Chudleigh
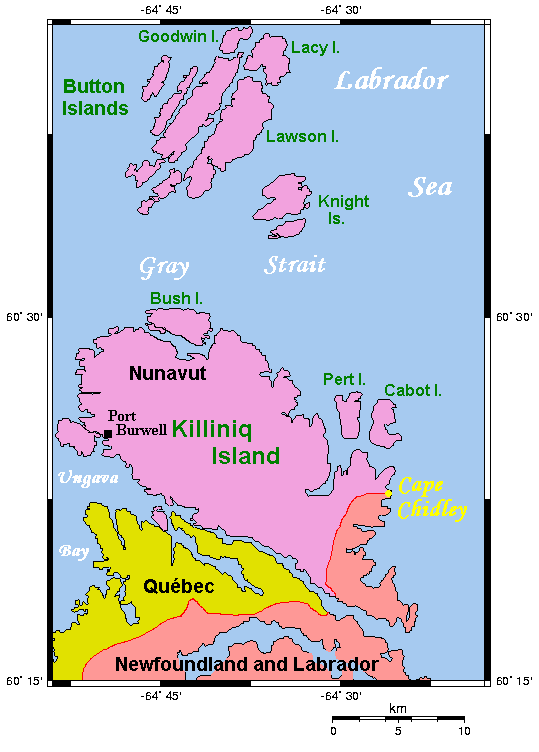
- Closeup map of Cape Chidley area

- Location of Cape Chidley within Canada
- Coordinates: 60°22′40″N 64°26′02″W
- Country: Canada
- Territory/Province: Nunavut/Newfoundland and Labrador
- Elevation: 350 m (1,150 ft)
- Time zone: UTC−04:00 (AST)
  - Summer (DST): UTC−03:00 (ADT)

Cape Chidley is a headland located on the eastern shore of Killiniq Island, Canada, at the northeastern tip of the Labrador Peninsula.

Cape Chidley was named by English explorer John Davis on August 1, 1587, after his friend and fellow explorer John Chidley. On October 22, 1943, the German submarine U-537 landed just south of Cape Chidley and set up Weather Station Kurt to collect data about the weather.

In the original plans for the Pinetree Line (a series of radar stations along the 50th parallel north), Cape Chidley was meant to be the site for a long-range radar station called "N-30". Supplies were moved to the site by ship during 1951–52, but in late 1952–early 1953 the site was moved to CFS Resolution Island on Resolution Island.

== Location ==
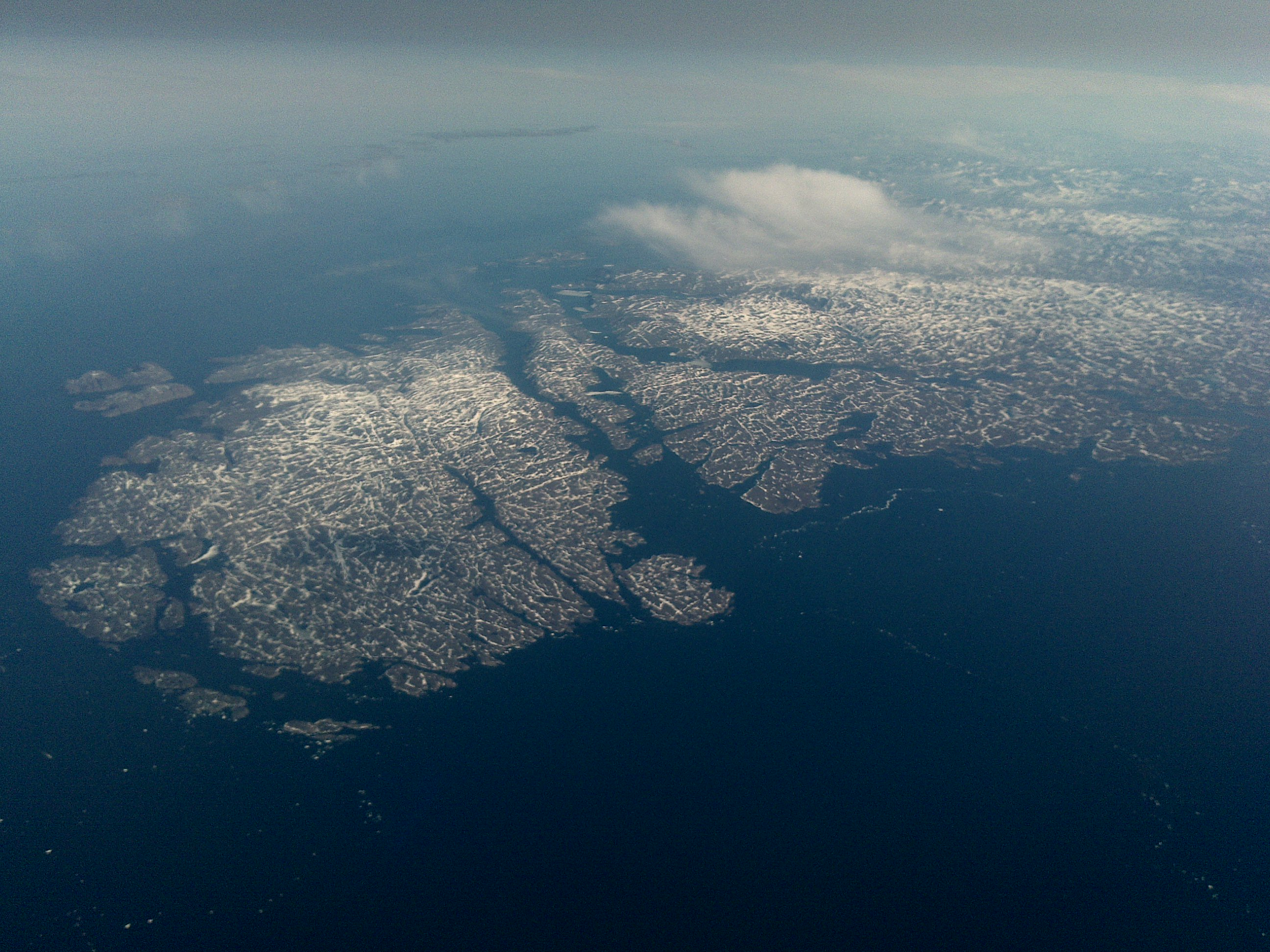
Killiniq Island. Cape Chidley is located in the upper left quadrant

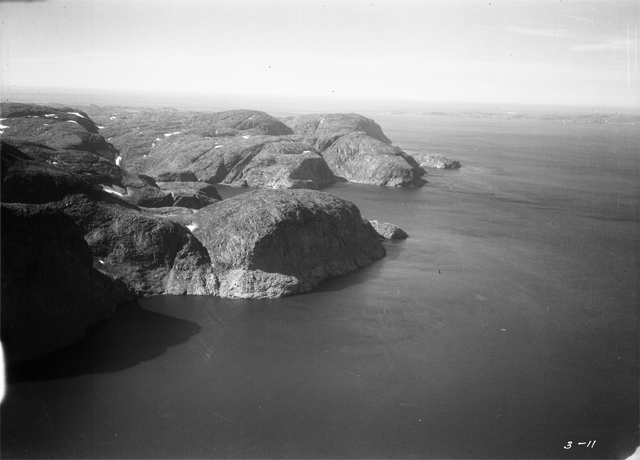
Aerial view of coastal cliffs of Cape Chidley, Cabot Island in the background with Button Islands visible in distance

Sometimes spelled Cape Chudleigh, Cape Chidley is on the short boundary between the province of Newfoundland and Labrador and the territory of Nunavut on Killiniq Island. It forms the northernmost point of Labrador.

The Dominion of Newfoundland, having been a separate country at the time that Canada's Arctic islands were assigned in this manner, shared a boundary with Canada on Killiniq Island. The territory of Labrador included the entire Atlantic watershed of the Labrador Peninsula and its islands.

The northern and western part of Killiniq Island (under Nunavut's jurisdiction) drains into Ungava Bay and the Hudson Strait. Thus Cape Chidley is also the terminus of the Laurentian Divide, which separates the Arctic Ocean watershed from the Atlantic Ocean watershed. (Some sources include Hudson Bay in the Atlantic Ocean watershed, though the Laurentian Divide has been long established and places Hudson Bay with the Arctic Ocean watershed.) The cape marks the south end of the entrance to the Hudson Strait, opposite Resolution Island.

The closest community to Cape Chidley was Port Burwell, Nunavut, until it was evacuated in 1978. Killiniq Island itself is separated from mainland North America by the narrow McLelan Strait.

The Torngat Mountains run along the coast of Labrador and terminate at Killiniq Island. The top of the knoll forming the headland at Cape Chidley has an elevation of 350 metres (1,150 ft), making the cape considerably higher than either of its two flanking headlands.

The Cape Chidley Islands lie at the north end of the cape.
