= Hettash Island =

Island in Nunavut, Canada

Coordinates: 60°30′01″N 64°48′54″W

Hettash Island is an uninhabited island in the Qikiqtaaluk Region of Nunavut, Canada. It has an elevation of 100 feet (30 m). Located in the Hudson Strait, it is one of the largest islands lying off the west end of Bush Island. The two islands are separated from each other by Lenz Strait. Perrett and Flat islands are nearby.
