= Elwin Bay =

Bay in Nunavut, Canada

- Location within Nunavut
- Location: Prince Regent Inlet
- Coordinates: 73°32′N 90°55′W
- Ocean/sea sources: Arctic Ocean
- Basin countries: Canada
- Settlements: Uninhabited

Elwin Bay is an Arctic waterway in the Qikiqtaaluk Region, Nunavut, Canada. It is located Prince Regent Inlet by the northeastern shore of Somerset Island. The abandoned trading post of Port Leopold lies 40 km (25 mi) north.

== History ==
In 1852, in search of Franklin's lost expedition, the French Arctic explorer Lieutenant Joseph René Bellot spent time in the bay and its surrounds.

It is filled with the skeletons and bones of several hundred beluga left by whalers. Many hunters died on whaling expeditions.
