= Perrett Island =

Island in Nunavut, Canada

Coordinates: 60°30′11″N 64°47′54″W

Perrett Island is an uninhabited island in the Qikiqtaaluk Region of Nunavut, Canada. It has an elevation of 200 feet (61 m). Located in the Hudson Strait, it is one of the largest islands lying off the west end of Bush Island. The two islands are separated from each other by Lenz Strait. Hettash and Flat islands are nearby.
