= CGS Stanley =

Canadian icebreaker

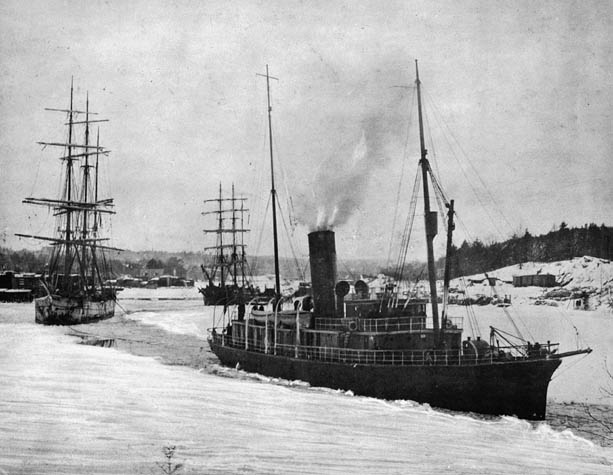
- The Canadian Government Ship Stanley escorting two vessels.

History

Canada
- Name: Stanley
- Builder: Fairfield Shipbuilding and Engineering, Glasgow
- Launched: 16 October 1888
- Completed: November 1888
- In service: 1888
- Out of service: 1935
- Fate: Scrapped, 1936

General characteristics
- Type: Icebreaker
- Tonnage: 914 GRT
- Length: 207 ft (63 m)
- Beam: 32 ft (9.8 m)
- Draught: 13.5 ft (4.1 m)
- Propulsion: 1 × screw, Steam triple-expansion engine, 2,300 hp (1,715 kW) (nominal)
- Speed: 15 knots (28 km/h)

CGS Stanley has been described as Canada's first effective icebreaker. She was launched in 1888, and remained in service until 1935. Constructed in the United Kingdom, Stanley was deployed along the East Coast of Canada for use as a ferry and lighthouse and buoy supply vessel and was used for icebreaking during winter months.

== Description ==
Stanley's design was based on icebreaking vessels of Swedish design for use in the Baltic Sea. Of Siemens-Martin steel construction, Stanley had a bowsprit and a clipper bow. The ship had a gross register tonnage (GRT) of 914 tons and was 207 feet (63.1 m) long overall with a beam of 32 feet (9.8 m) and a draught of 13.5 feet (4.1 m).

The ship was powered by steam from a triple-expansion engine driving a single screw. This created 2,300 horsepower (1,715 kW) (nominal) and gave the vessel a maximum speed of 15 knots (28 km/h). The ship was certificated for passenger service in Canada.

== Service history ==
Stanley was ordered by the Government of Canada following complaints by Prince Edward Island that Canada was not following through on its constitutional commitments to the province. The existing icebreaker, Northern Light, was found to be in poor shape and was withdrawn from service. The construction of an icebreaker was ordered from Fairfield Shipbuilding and Engineering of Glasgow, Scotland at their yard in Govan with the ship's launch on 16 October 1888. Stanley was named for Frederick Stanley, 16th Earl of Derby, and completed in November 1888.

Upon entering service in 1888, Stanley's primary function was to provide winter passenger ferry service to Prince Edward Island, making daily trips from Charlottetown and Pictou, Nova Scotia until the ice forced the ship to work from Georgetown, Prince Edward Island. Even though she was capable of breaking ice, the ship sometimes remained caught in it when the ice became too thick. During the spring, once regular ferry service could be resumed, Stanley's duties were shifted to lighthouse and buoy supply. During the summer months, the ship was used as a fisheries patrol vessel in the Atlantic fisheries. During autumn, Stanley reverted to lighthouse and buoy supply.

In 1910 Stanley and Earl Grey sailed to Hudson Bay and Hudson Strait to survey the routes to Churchill and Port Nelson, Manitoba, returning to the area in 1912. On 2 May 1922, Stanley rescued an American steamer, Cairnmona, when she was disabled off the coast of Cape Breton Island.

In July 1927 a scientific expedition based on the aboard Stanley and the commercial vessel SS Larch was tasked to determine the safe navigation season for vessels using the new port facilities at Churchill, Manitoba, the only port on the Arctic Ocean connected to the North American railroad grid. The Aviators of Hudson Strait, a 1973 Canadian short documentary film produced by the National Film Board of Canada (NFB) for the Department of National Defence, was made of the 1927–1928 expedition. The ship was withdrawn from service in 1935. The ship was sold in 1936 for scrap and the scrapping was completed first quarter of 1937.
