= Prince Leopold Island =

Island in Nunavut, Canada

Native name: ᐅᑉᐸᐃᑦ (Appait)
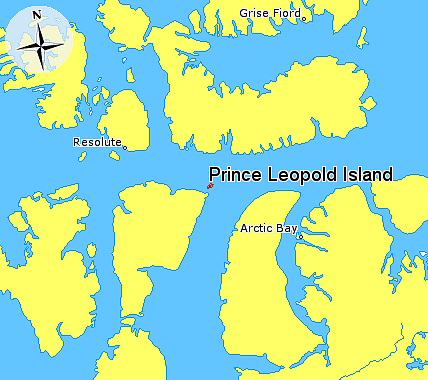
- Prince Leopold Island in relation to Grise Fiord, Resolute, and Arctic Bay.

- Location within Nunavut Location within Canada
- Etymology: Named after Prince Leopold of Saxe-Coburg-Saalfeld in 1819

Geography
- Location: Northern Canada
- Coordinates: 74°N 90°W
- Archipelago: Arctic Archipelago
- Area: 68 km^{2} (26 sq mi)
- Length: 10.9 km (6.77 mi)
- Width: 9.2 km (5.72 mi)
- Highest elevation: 306 m (1004 ft)

Administration
- Canada
- Territory: Nunavut
- Region: Qikiqtaaluk

Demographics
- Population: Uninhabited

Prince Leopold Island (Inuktitut: ᐅᑉᐸᐃᑦ, Appait) is an island in the Qikiqtaaluk Region of Nunavut, Canada. It is located in Lancaster Sound at the junction of Prince Regent Inlet and Barrow Strait. Somerset Island is situated 13 km (8.1 mi) to the southwest; Port Leopold, an abandoned trading post, is the closest landmark. The island is significant as a summer habitat and breeding ground for large populations of several arctic bird species.

== History ==
Evidence of Inuit habitation in the form of house pits and bones from bowhead whales and other marine mammals is present on the north and southeast spits of the island. The island and Somerset Island to its south were first sighted by a European on August 4, 1819, during William Parry's 1819 expedition, who named them Prince Leopold's Isles after then prince Leopold of Saxe-Coburg-Saalfeld (the future King Leopold I of Belgium). Ornithological field research began on the island in the 1950s, and an Environment Canada research station was established on the island in 1975. Research has been conducted on the island almost every year since then, for varying lengths of time during summer. The camp, situated in the southeast of the island, consists of an airstrip, two small plywood cabins, and two plywood platform for the erection of temporary structures.

== Geography and Geology ==
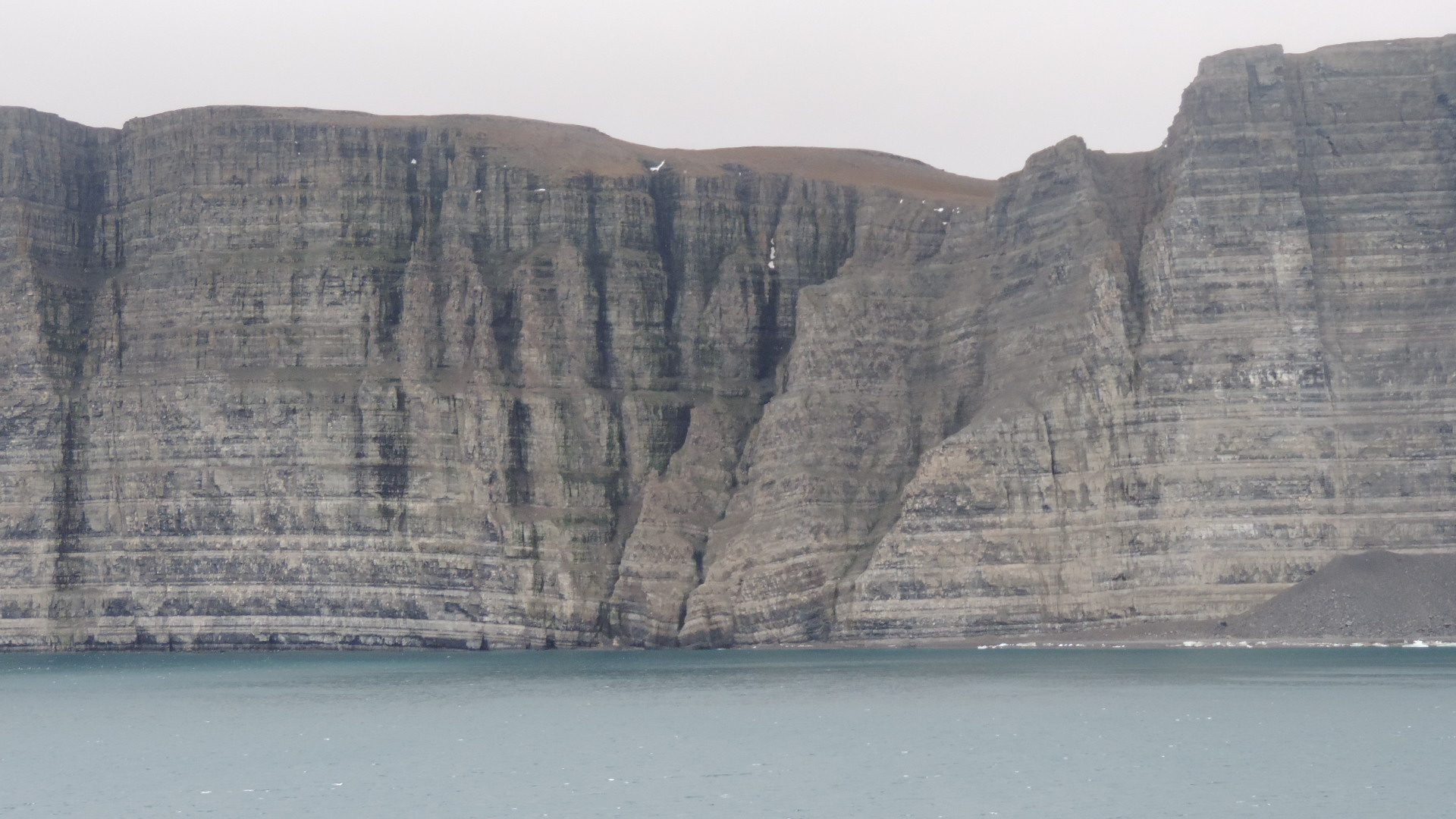
Cliffs along the south-east face of Prince Leopold Island, September 2019

Most of Prince Leopold Island rises steeply from the surrounding sea, with cliffs rising as high as 265 m (869 ft) above sea level surrounding most of the island. On the east and northeast sides of the island, the drops are sheer, going directly down to the sea, while around the rest of the island, there are steep scree slopes between the base of the cliffs and the water. The majority of the island's area of 68 km^{2} (26 sq mi) is occupied by a plateau generally ranging in altitude between around 240 m (790 ft) and 300 m (980 ft). The plateau is divided in the east by a gorge that runs north–south across the width of the island, while smaller steep canyons skirt the edge of the island and main gorge at various points. Four gravel spits, in the north, southwest, south, and southeast of the island, jut out from the coast. During the summer, surface water on the island is scarce. A few small shallow lakes exist on the plateau; the largest, Far Lake, is about 0.5 km (0.31 mi) long, and is located near the eastern cliffs. There is one perennial stream on the island, which drains the plateau, including Far Lake, through the main gorge, flowing into the sea near the southeast spit.

The bedrock of the island, which forms the prominent cliffs, is horizontally bedded Silurian limestone and sandstone. Erosion of the sedimentary rock has formed crevices and rock ledges on large sections of the cliff faces, which provide nesting sites for large numbers of breeding seabirds.

== Ecology ==
=== Conservation ===
The island is a Canadian Important Bird Area (#NU006), a federally listed migratory bird sanctuary since 1995, and a Key Migratory Bird Terrestrial Habitat site (NU Site 15).

=== Flora ===
Vegetation consists of forbs, lichens, and mosses, though the top of the island is mostly devoid of plants. Denser concentrations of vegetation occur in seepage areas on the spits, including sedges and some dwarf willow. The most densely covered area of highland is in the southeast, where some saxifrages, mostly the purple and nodding species, and arctic poppy can be found. On the south cliffs too, growths of common scurvygrass and arctic mouse-ear occur.

=== Fauna ===
Large numbers of arctic seabirds, thick-billed murres, northern fulmars, black-legged kittiwakes, and black guillemots breed on the cliff ledges, arriving in the vicinity in May or early June and departing by mid-September. Intermittent studies since the 1970s record regular habitation by approximately 155,000 mating pairs of various species, nesting annually on cliff faces around the circumference of the island. The island is one of the most important locations for breeding marine birds in the Canadian Arctic, having larger numbers and a greater diversity of species than any other site in the region. Other birds nest in smaller numbers: brant geese, common eiders, parasitic jaegers, ravens and snow bunting. Glaucous gulls, which regularly predate on the eggs and sometimes adults of the other species, have similar sized nesting population, of about 75 pairs.

The surrounding sea-ice around the island breaks up relatively early, in March or April, and the nearby waters of Lancaster Sound and Barrow Strait becomes rich with nutrients towards the late spring and early summer when it thaws, resulting in high ecological productivity. Abundant plankton supports fish and crustacean populations, in turn becoming food for nearby birds and numerous species of marine mammals. Beluga, and bowhead whales, narwhals, walruses, and ringed and bearded seals roam nearby.

The only resident land mammals are a small population of northern collared lemmings, though visits by larger mammals - caribou, hares, foxes, and bears - are recorded.

== Gallery ==
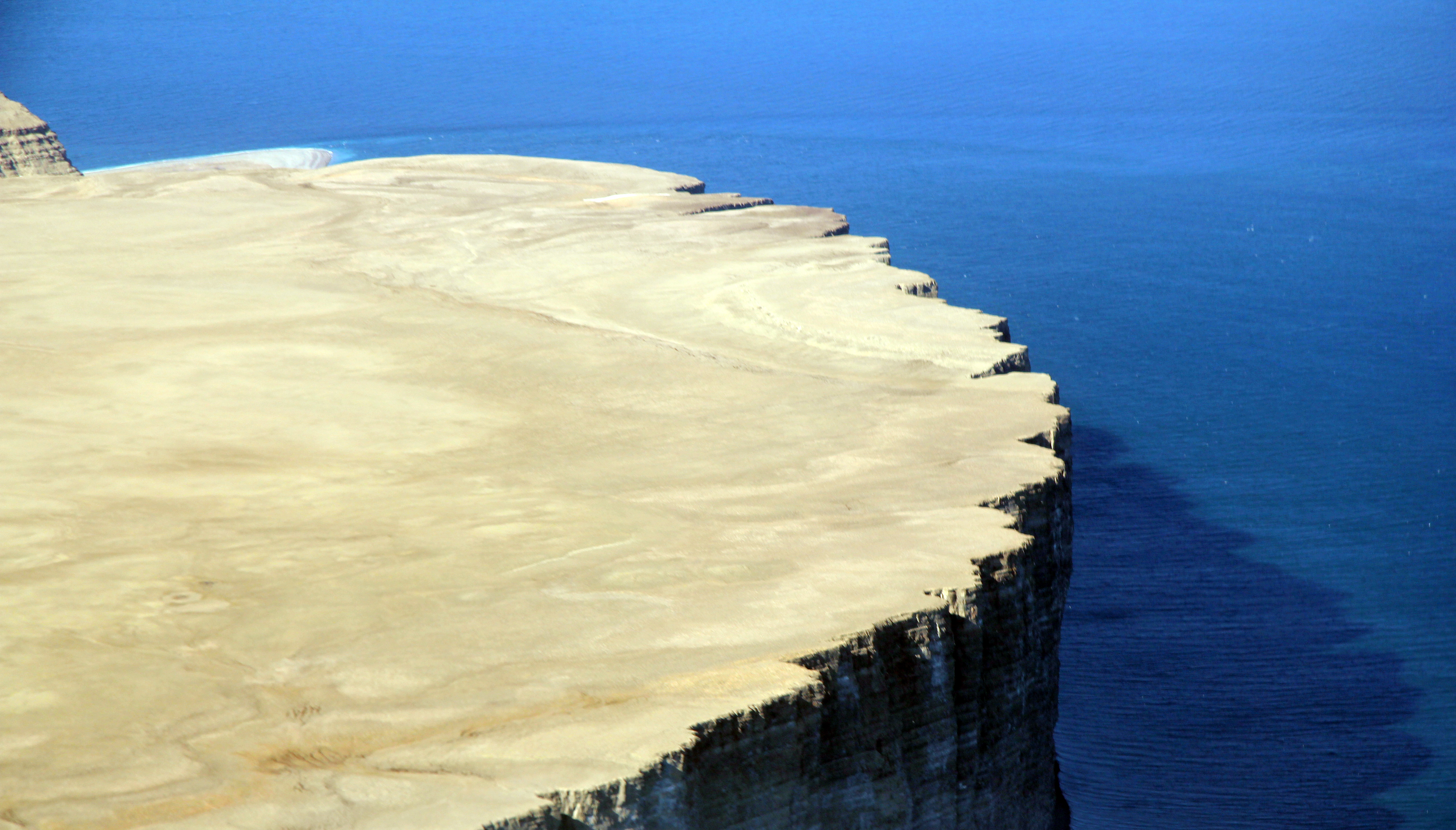
Closeup of the cliffs

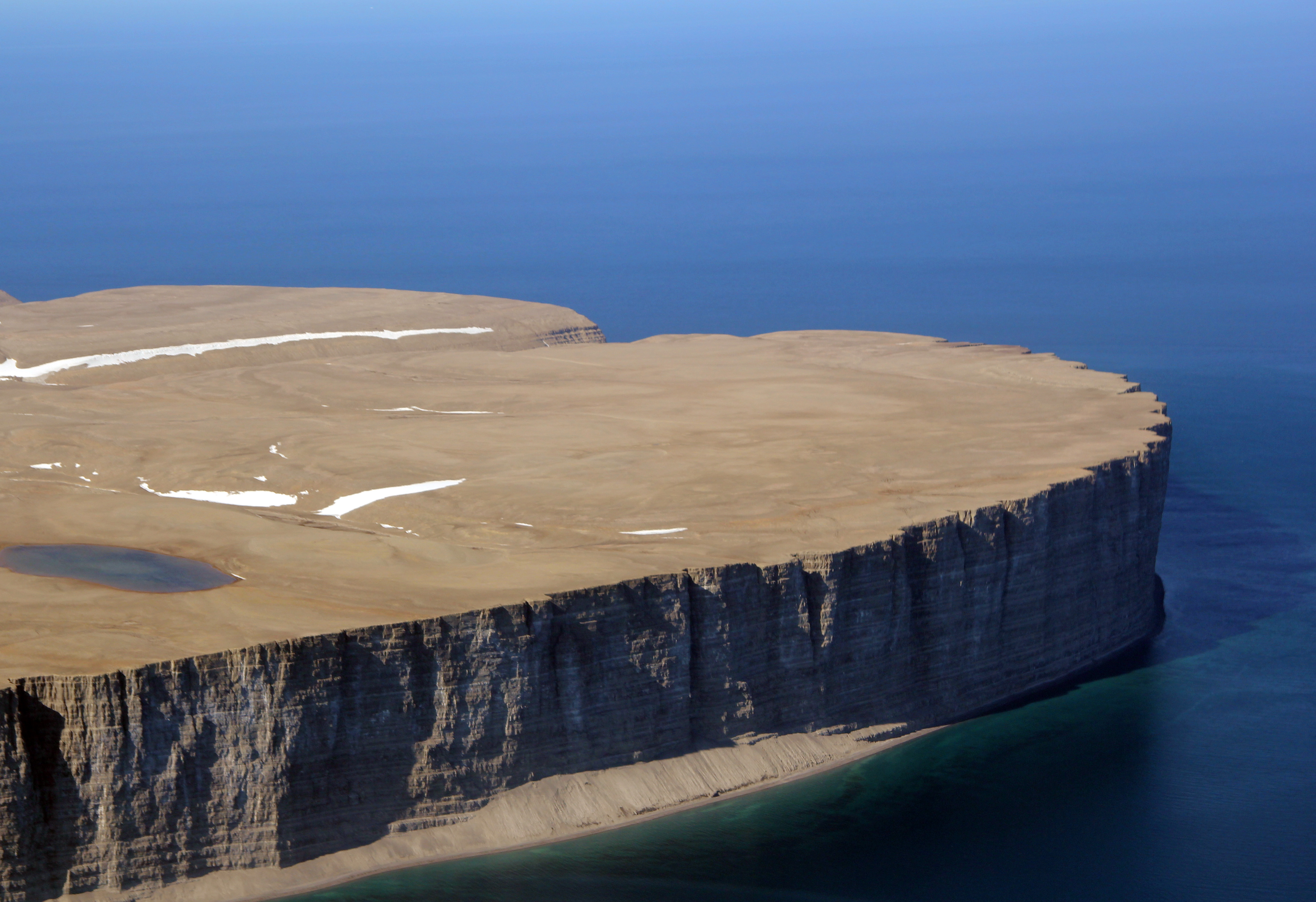
Northeastern tip of Prince Leopold Island, with Far Lake on the left

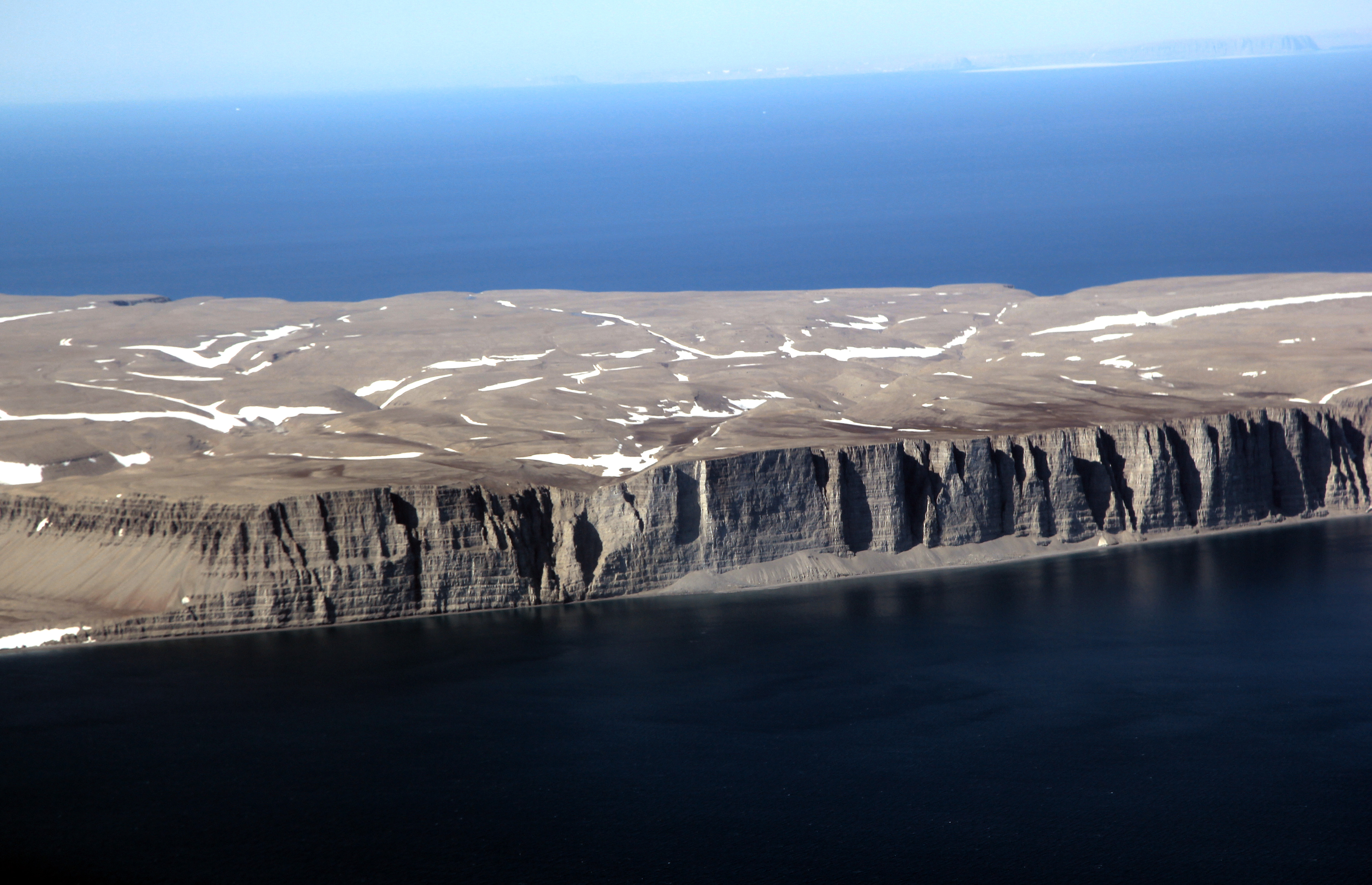
Prince Leopold Island

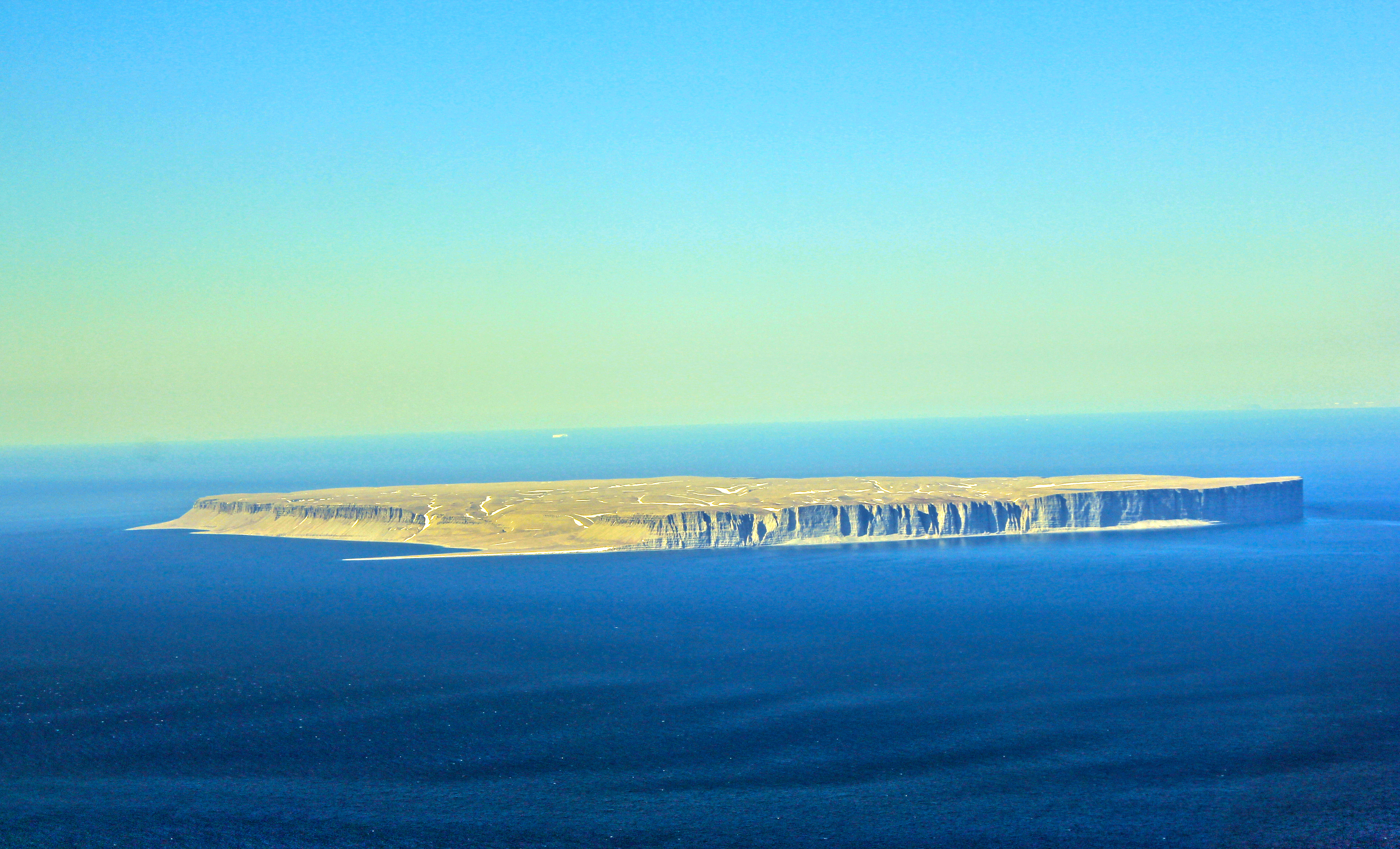
Full view of Prince Leopold Island
