= Dundas Harbour =

Ghost town on Devon Island, Qikiqtaaluk, Nunavut, Canada

Dundas Harbour Talluruti
- Ghost town
- Dundas Harbour (Nunavut)
- Coordinates: 74°32′N 82°23′W
- Country: Canada
- Territory: Nunavut
- Founded: August 1924
- Abandoned: 1951

Population
  - Total: 0

Dundas Harbour (Inuktitut: Talluruti, "a woman's chin with tattoos on it") is an abandoned settlement in the Qikiqtaaluk Region, Nunavut, Canada. It is located on Devon Island at the eastern shore of the waterway also named Dundas Harbour (74°33′N 82°30′W). Baffin Bay's Croker Bay is immediately to the west and Parry Channel to the south.

An outpost was established at the harbour in August 1924 as part of a government presence intended to curb foreign whaling and other activities. The Hudson's Bay Company leased the outpost in 1933. The following year, 52 Inuit were relocated from Kinngait (then called Cape Dorset) to Dundas Harbour but they returned to the mainland 13 years later.

Dundas Harbour was populated again in the late 1940s to maintain a patrol presence, but it was closed again in 1951 due to ice difficulties. The Royal Canadian Mounted Police detachment was moved to Craig Harbour on southern Ellesmere Island.

Only the ruins of a few buildings remain, along with one of the northernmost cemeteries in Canada.

== Gallery ==
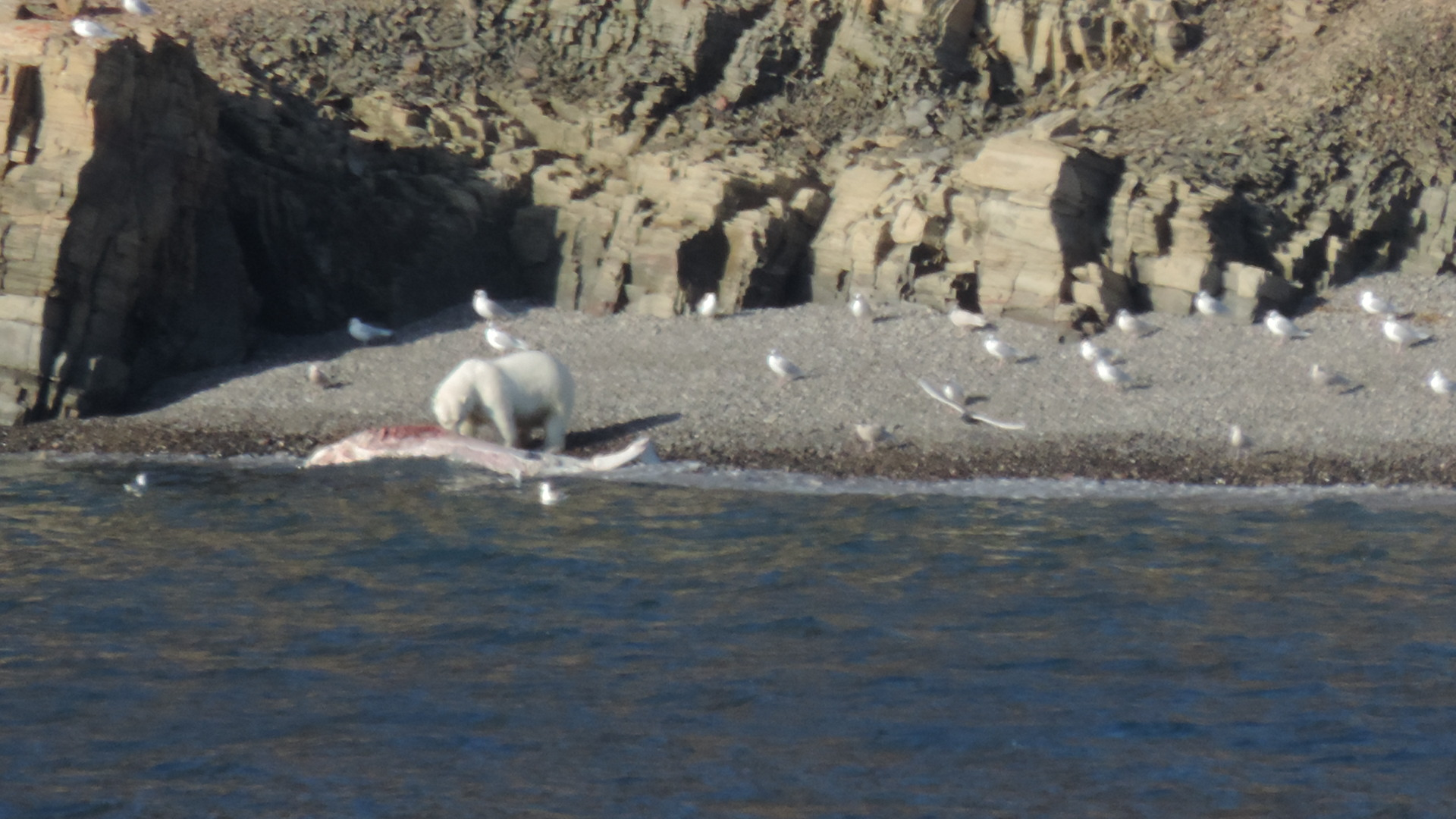
Polar bear eating a beluga whale in Dundas Harbor

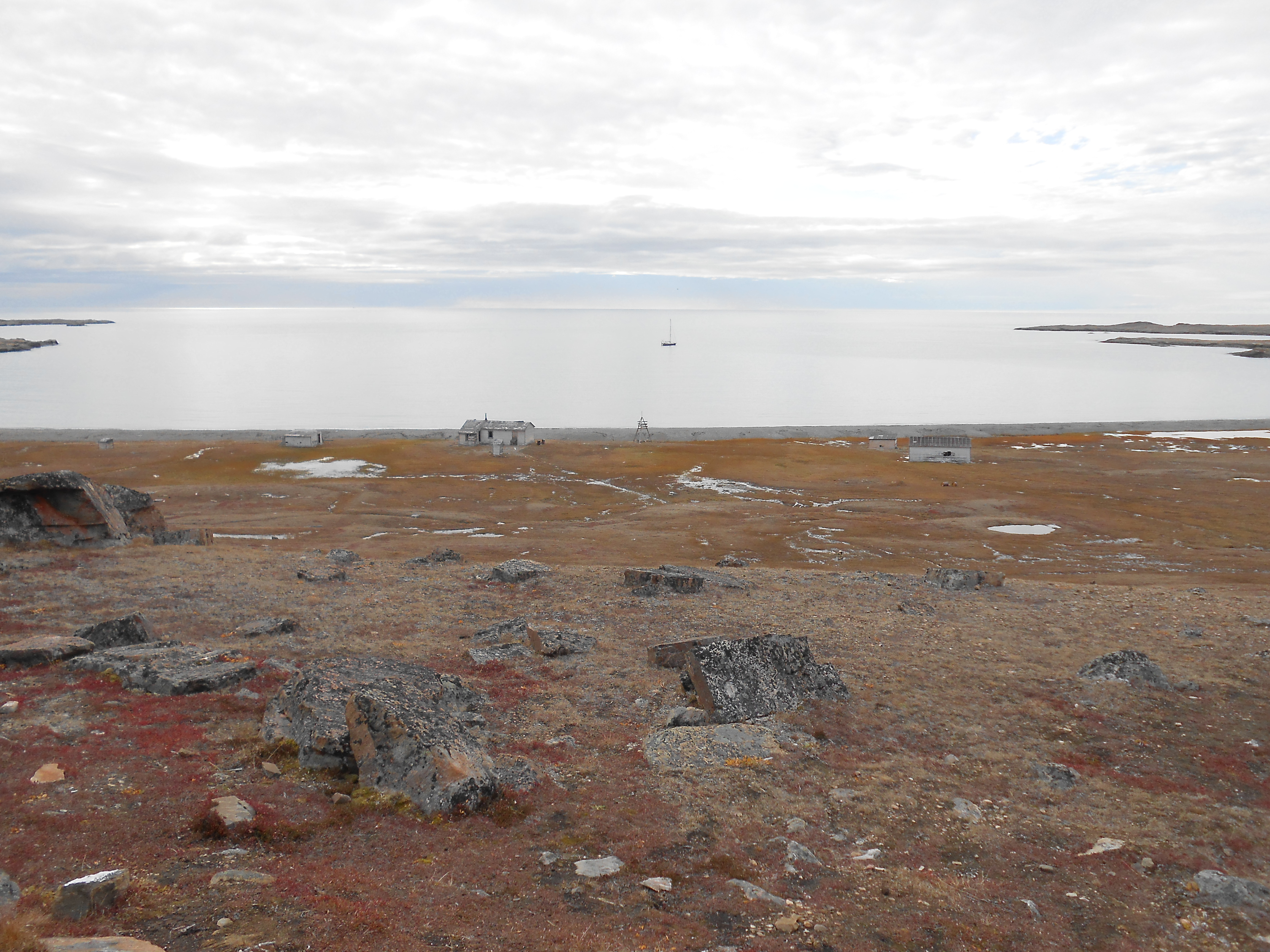
Abandoned settlement in Johnson Bay, Dundas Harbour (from near the cemetery)

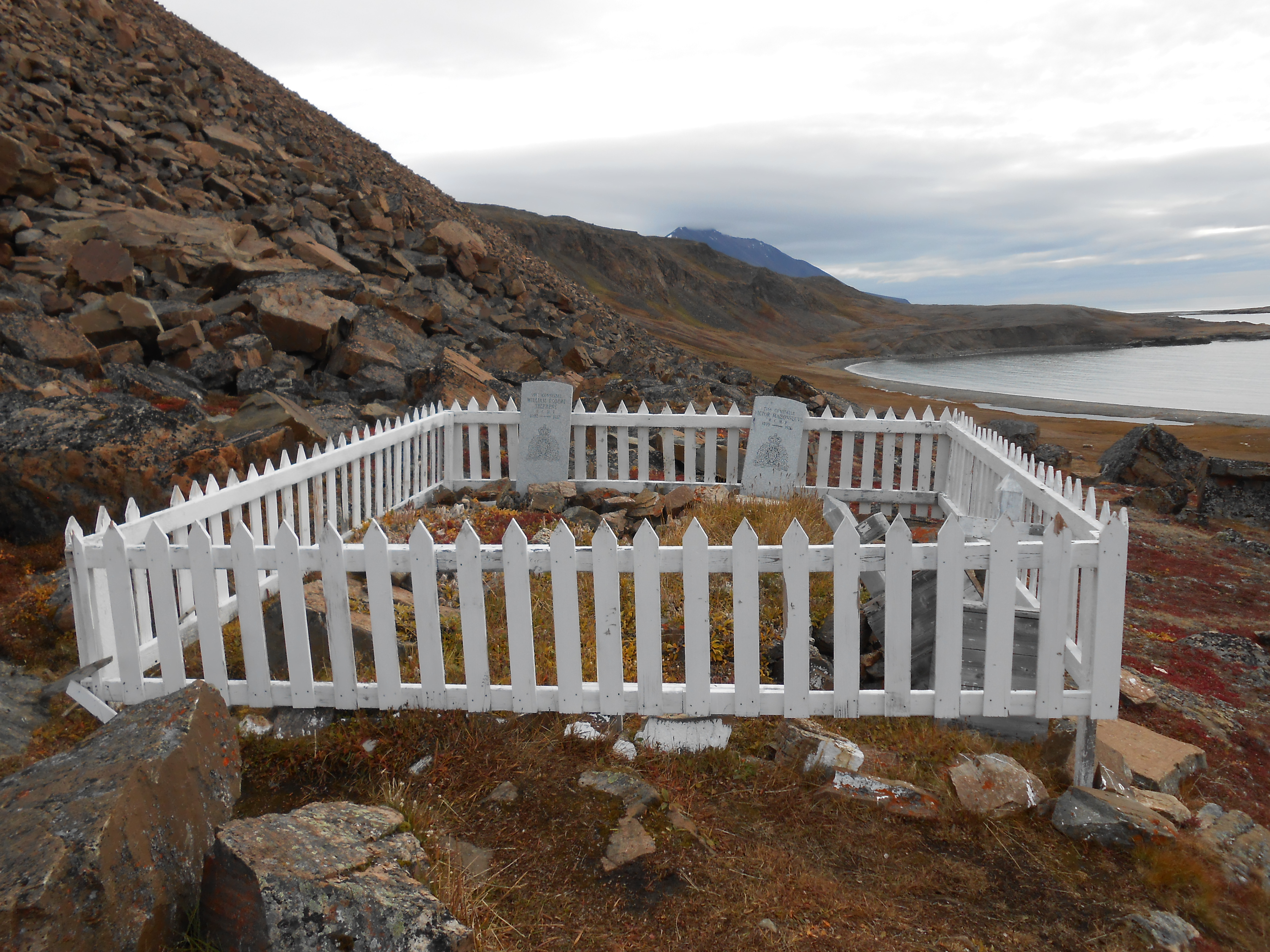
Johnson Bay Cemetery, Dundas Harbour sits above the abandoned settlement. It contains the graves of two RCMP members.

== See also ==
- List of communities in Nunavut
