= Killiniq, Nunavut =

Ghost town in Nunavut, Canada

Killiniq ᑭᓪᓕᓂᖅ Kikkertaujak; Killipaartalik
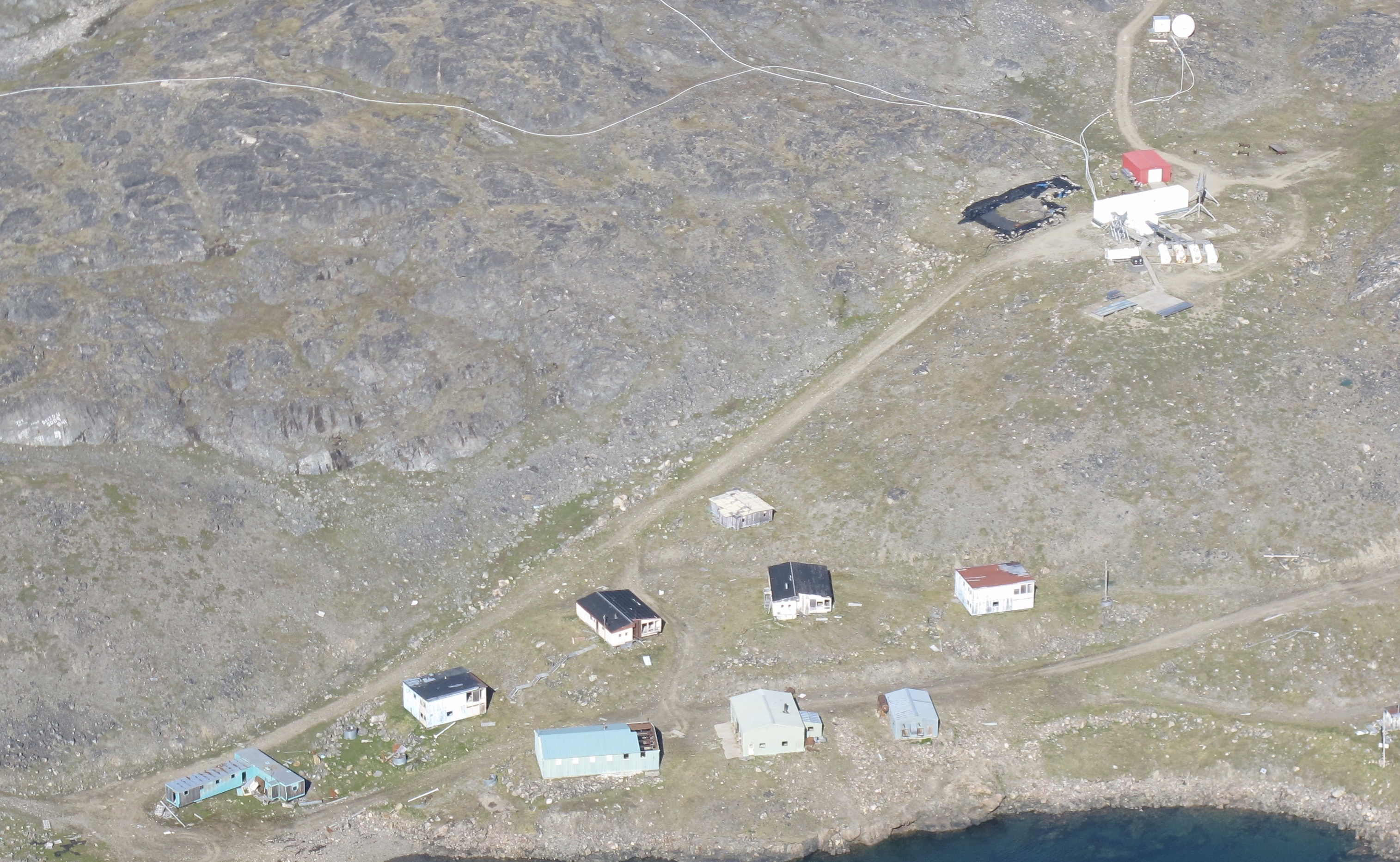

- Location within Nunavut Location within Canada
- Coordinates: 60°25′16″N 064°49′54″W
- Country: Canada
- Territory: Nunavut
- Region: Qikiqtaaluk

Population (after 8 February 1978)
  - Total: 0

Killiniq (meaning: ice floes, Inuktitut: ᑭᓪᓕᓂᖅ) (previous spelling: Killinek; local variants: Killipaartalik or Kikkertaujak (peninsula); previously: Bishop Jones' Village; sometimes referred to as: Port Burwell) is a former Inuit settlement, weather station, trading post, missionary post, fishing station, and Royal Canadian Mounted Police post on Killiniq Island. Previously within Labrador, and then the Northwest Territories, it is now situated within the borders of Nunavut. The community closed in 1978.

== Geography ==
Killiniq, the settlement, is located on Killiniq Island, situated in Ungava Bay at the extreme northern tip of Labrador. The island contains the only land border between the territory of Nunavut, to the west, and the province of Newfoundland and Labrador, to the east.

The settlement developed around Port Burwell harbour, located at the mouth of Hudson Strait. It is surrounded by coastal cliffs of an otherwise barren and rocky island, and a sea, frozen almost year-round.

Though there is an abundance of seal, walrus, and Arctic char that promoted habitation, the settlement area is bereft of trees and wood. Some brushwood is scattered amongst stones. Wildflowers and moss are found nearby, but berries are located further afield.

== History ==
The Killiniq locality appears as early as 1569 on a Mercator map. It was visited in 1587 by John Davis, and in 1602 by George Weymouth.

Approximately 9.7 km (6 mi) south of Killiniq, Alpheus Spring Packard, the American entomologist and palaeontologist, discovered the remains of an Inuit settlement.

A Dominion Government Meteorological Station was established at Port Burwell in 1884.

From 1898 through 1904, Job Brothers & Co., Limited, a Newfoundland Colony-based mercantile and trading company operated a fishing station.

The Anglican missionary, Sam M. Stewart of the Colonial and Continental Church Society, arrived in 1899 to establish a mission. Having been appointed by Llewellyn Jones, who was the bishop of the Diocese of Newfoundland, to the post, Stewart called the settlement "Bishop Jones' Village". in 1899.

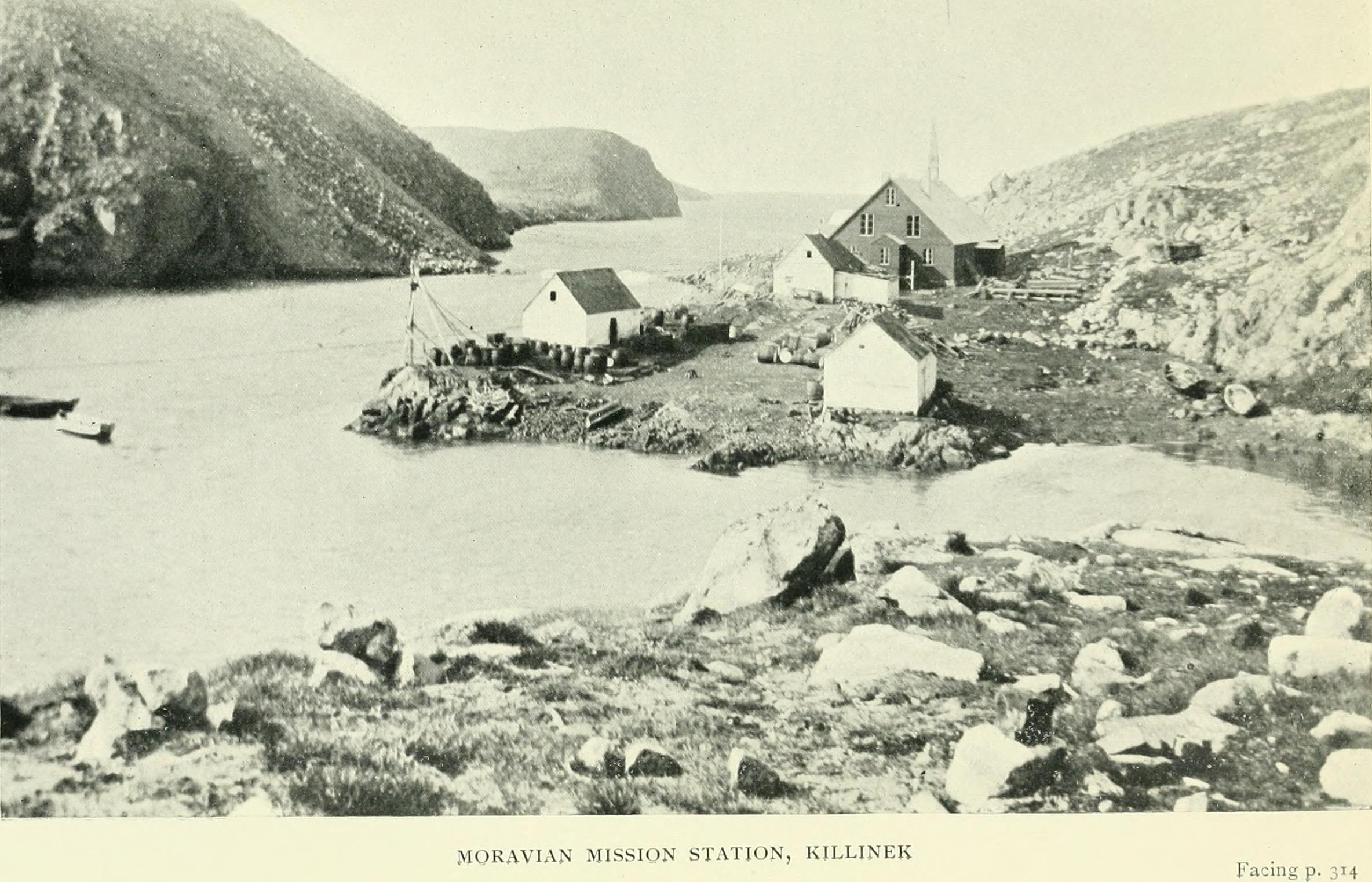
Moravian mission station, 1910

In 1904, the Moravian missionaries, the Brethren's Society for the Furtherance of the Gospel among the Heathen, bought the Job Brothers station. At the northwest corner of the Fort Burwell harbour, they established their own mission and trading post, including a bakery, smithy, and carpentry shop. Church services included a harmonium. The next year, the Moravians announced in their periodical account that the local name "Kikkertaujak" would be changed to "Killinek". Some of the missionaries included P. Hettasch, Walter W. Perrett, and S. Waldmann. During the period of August–October 1906, Bernhard Hantzsch, an ornithologist from Dresden stayed at the Killiniq mission studying Inuit culture, and creating bird and mammal inventories of the surrounding lakes and mountains. The Moravians closed their mission in 1924.

In 1916, the Hudson's Bay Company (HBC) moved their George River trading post to the northeast part of the Fort Burwell harbour. The Moravians sold their post to the HBC in 1923, and the HBC closed the consolidated trading post in 1939.

In 1920, the Royal Canadian Mounted Police (RCMP) posted a detachment, and in 1926 expanded it. It was moved in 1936 to Port Harrison, Quebec, now Inukjuak.

In 1942, the HBC moved a dozen residents from Port Burwell to Southampton Island. Though Killinek lacked a permanent landing strip because of its terrain, the United States Army, Air Force, Navy and Coast Guard wanted to use the location as a stop over while constructing Arctic airfields in Baffin Island, Northern Quebec, and Greenland during the Second World War.

The Kikitayok Co-op was established in 1952 with animal materials, sculptures, pilot biscuits, sardines, and ammunition. It was the second co-op in the eastern Arctic. In 1964, a classroom was built and there was a full-time teacher in Killiniq. The airport code for the landing strip was XBW.

Although Inuit living at Killiniq were recognized as a signatory to the James Bay and Northern Quebec Agreement in November 1975, this did not prevent a gradual deterioration in government services and programs at Killiniq. This decline created an insecure environment and gave rise to a slow out migration of families in search of settlements with assured access to essential services, especially medical and air transport. Between November 1975 and February 1978, a total of 50 Inuit left Killiniq in search of a more secure environment.

On 8 February 1978, the 47 people that remained were notified by radio that the government of the Northwest Territories was sending planes to move them from the community and that the settlement would be closed. The majority were moved to Kangiqsualujjuaq, Quebec, on the southern end of Ungava Bay. All the former residents were scattered in the host communities of Nunavik, the homeland of Quebec Inuit. They arrived without housing, without income, and without many of their personal effects. Family groups were broken up and Inuit were separated from their seasonal hunting territory. The host communities were neither advised nor prepared for this influx of people and there were no follow up programs or special funds to help with the resettlement.

In subsequent years, there were sporadic visits by Inuit to Killiniq, including a fisheries project from 1983 through 1985 sponsored by Makivvik, the legal representative of Quebec's Inuit. Feasibility studies were conducted in the mid-1980s to relocate the displaced Killiniq Inuit to Taqpangajuk, Quebec, on the mainland, 40 km (25 mi) to the south of Killiniq. In the winter of 1987, several displaced Killiniq families established a new community at Taqpangajuk without government assistance.

Killiniq served as a summertime Canadian Coast Guard weather station (VAW) until the early 1990s.

== Demographics ==
During 200 years of recorded history, between 1773 and 1978, Inuit population estimates fluctuated from as small as two or three families, to as many as 200 residents. In addition to the semi-permanent Inuit, Killiniq's posts, missions, and weather stations were also populated with seasonal traders, missionaries, and weather observers.

Inuit population estimates
Year	Residents	Families	Notes
1773	100		Estimate by Jens Haven, Moravian missionary and explorer.
1884–86			Plus Dominion weather observer Burwell, with two assistants.
1898	80		
1899			Plus Anglican missionary Rev. Stewart, with Henry Ford, interpreter.
1904	80		
1914–1916			Plus Moravian missionary Karl Filschke, wife, and three children.
1920		4–5	Plus Sergeant Wight and Constable Butler of the RCMP.
1939–1952		5	
1955		2–3	
1960	20–30		
1964	95		
1970	92		
1971	150		
1975	100		
1977	<50		
8 February 1978	0		The last 47 residents were evacuated on this day, leaving an abandoned settlement.
