= Port Burwell, Nunavut =

Harbour in Nunavut, Canada

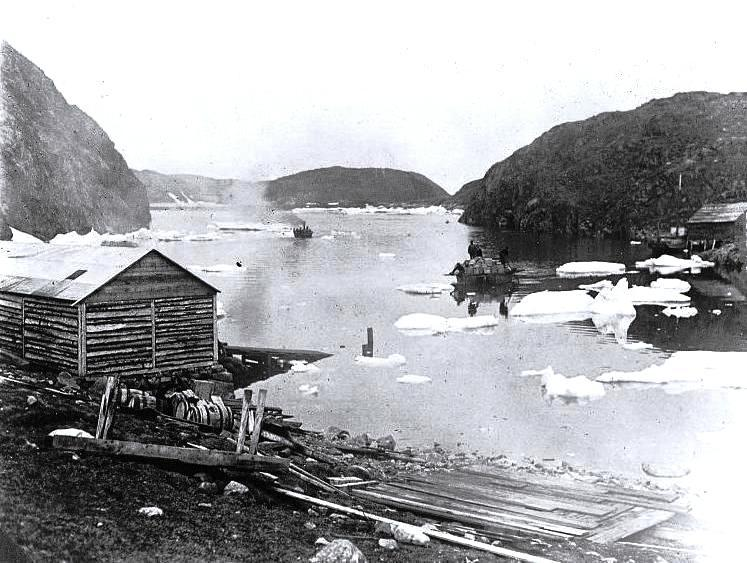
Transporting supplies to the HBC post at Port Burwell, 1919

Port Burwell is a harbour on western Killiniq Island, formed as an arm of Ungava Bay, at the mouth of Hudson Strait. Previously within Labrador, and then the Northwest Territories, it is now situated within the borders of Nunavut, Canada. Cape Chidley is 25 miles (40 km) to the northeast. The community of Port Burwell lies on the shore at 60°25′30″N 64°50′00″W.

== History ==
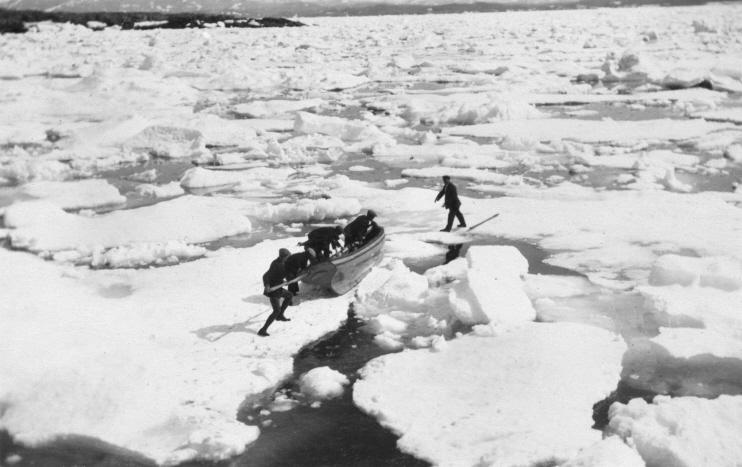
Going ashore at Port Burwell, July 1923

A Dominion Government Meteorological Station was established at Port Burwell during an 1884 voyage led by Commander Andrew R. Gordon, R.N., a retired Naval Officer, and assistant director of the Dominion Meteorological Service. Gordon named it in honour of one of the expedition's meteorological observers, Herbert M. Burwell of London, Ontario. Burwell was left in charge of Observing Station No. 1 in the port's harbour on the western side of Gray Strait until it closed in 1886.

Gordon returned to Port Burwell with a Hudson's Bay Company expedition in 1885 on the Alert, and established an HBC trading post within the harbour. In 1904, Moravian missionaries established a mission and trading post at the northwest corner of the harbour. Twelve years later, the HBC moved one of their trading posts to the northeast area of the harbour.

In the 1920s, a Royal Canadian Mounted Police detachment was set up at Port Burwell. The Royal Corps of Signals (RCCS) built a radio station, and the Coast Guard built a base.

The settlement of Killiniq grew around the port. In 1978, all the residents were re-settled from the deep port community to host communities of Nunavik.
