= Craig Harbour =

Abandoned village in Nunavut, Canada

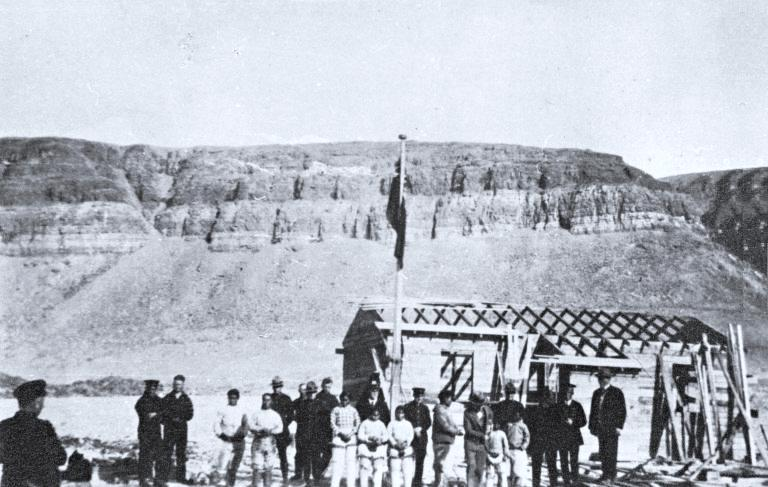
RCMP depot under construction, Craig Harbour, 1926

Craig Harbour (76°12′25″N 81°00′00″W) is an abandoned settlement in the Qikiqtaaluk Region, Nunavut, Canada. It is located on Ellesmere Island, on the north shore of Jones Sound, 55 km (34 mi) southeast of Grise Fiord.

In 1922, a Royal Canadian Mounted Police detachment was established at Craig Harbour, named in honour of Dr. John D. Craig, expedition commander. The site was selected as Smith Island protected the harbour from moving pack ice, and the nearby mouth of Jones Sound made the harbour's navigation accessible. The outpost was closed in the 1930s, and re-opened in 1951 at the start of the Cold War.

== See also ==
- List of communities in Nunavut
