= Killiniq Island =

Remote island in northeastern Canada

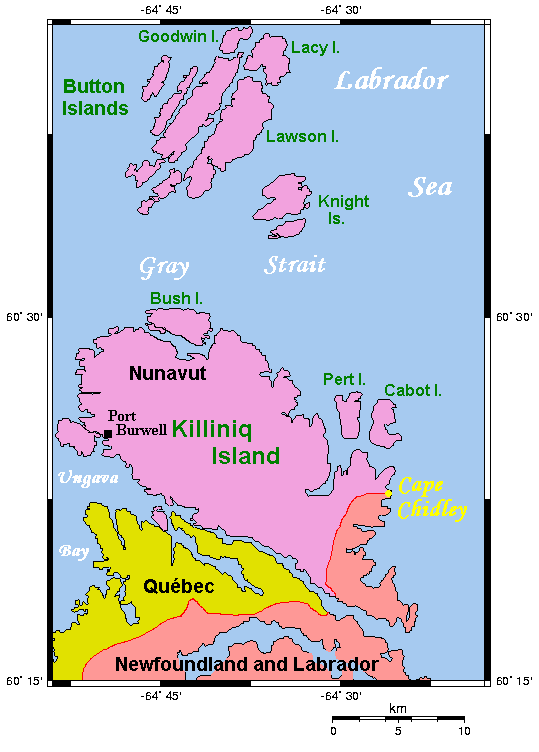
- Map of Killiniq Island

- Location within Nunavut Location within Newfoundland and Labrador Location within Canada

Geography
- Location: Northern Canada
- Coordinates: 60°24′45″N 64°38′25″W
- Archipelago: Arctic Archipelago
- Area: 269 km^{2} (104 sq mi)

Administration
- Canada
- Province / territory: Newfoundland and Labrador (southern); Nunavut (northern)

Demographics
- Population: Uninhabited

Additional information
- Time zones: EST (Nunavut) (UTC−05:00); AST (Labrador) (UTC−04:00)
  - Summer (DST): EDT (Nunavut) (UTC−04:00); ADT (Labrador) (UTC−03:00)

Killiniq Island (English: ice floes) is a remote uninhabited island in northeastern Canada. With a land area of about 269 square kilometres (104 square miles), it is governed by the territory of Nunavut in the north, while a smaller portion to the south is part of Newfoundland and Labrador.

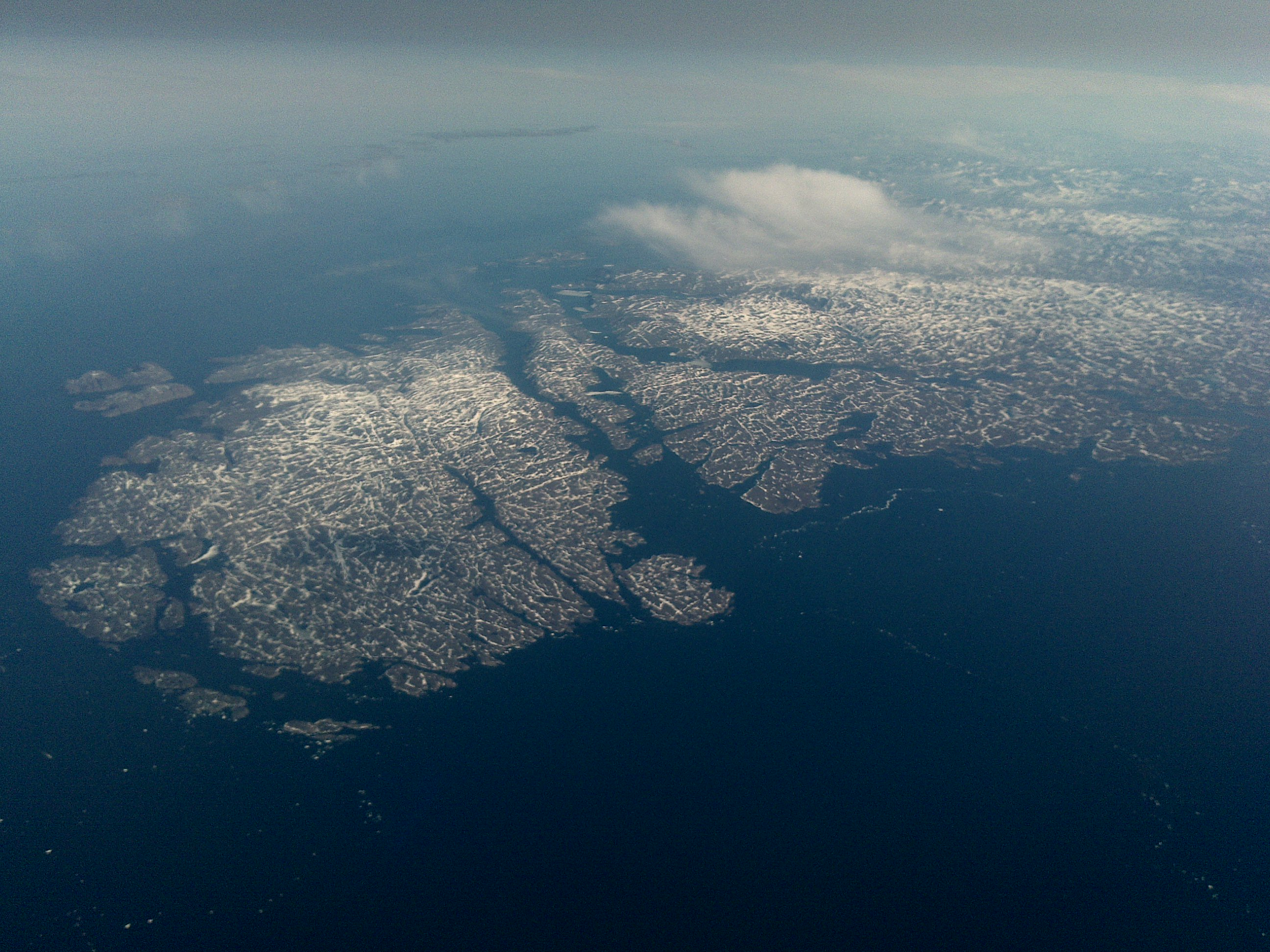
Photo of Killiniq Island in the front with mainland behind, taken in July 2009. The view is from the northwest towards the southeast.

Located at the northern tip of Labrador between Ungava Bay and the Labrador Sea, Killiniq contains the only land border between Nunavut and Newfoundland and Labrador. Most other islands off the northern coast of Quebec and Labrador belong exclusively to Nunavut. Some cartographic sources do not correctly show the island's geopolitical boundaries; for instance, the Commission de toponymie du Québec shows it as belonging to Quebec (an apparent consequence of Quebec's longstanding refusal to acknowledge the legal decision regarding the Labrador border).

The northernmost point of Newfoundland and Labrador is Cape Chidley on the island. The largest identifiable land mass is the Torngat Mountains, part of the Arctic Cordillera, which proceed from the north to the south of the island.

A former community, meteorological station, Canadian Coast Guard radio station, trading post, missionary post, fishing station, and Royal Canadian Mounted Police post existed until 1978, when it was evacuated by the government of the Northwest Territories. The settlement, also called Killiniq (alternate spelling: Killinek; also known as Port Burwell; local variants: Killipaartalik or Kikkertaujak; previously: Bishop Jones' Village) was on what is now the Nunavut side of the island, part of the territory's Qikiqtaaluk Region. The locality was known by Europeans as marked on the Mercator 1569 world map.

The island is now uninhabited, but an automated remote radio transmitter for Iqaluit Coast Guard Radio remains in operation.
