= Iglunga =

Uninhabited settlement in Nunavut, Canada

Iglunga Iglungayut
- Settlement
- Coordinates: 66°16′N 67°07′W
- Country: Canada
- Territory: Nunavut
- Region: Qikiqtaaluk

Iglunga (previously: Iglungayut) was an Inuit settlement, now uninhabited, in the Qikiqtaaluk Region, Nunavut, Canada.

== Information ==
It is located on a Baffin Island offshore island, just south of Iglunga Island, at the southern entrance into Bon Accord Harbour, southwest of Auyuittuq National Park Reserve. The nearest community is Pangnirtung. The elevation is 0.91 m (3 ft). The name change from Iglungayut to Iglunga occurred 1 August 1957.
