= Brooman Point Village =

Abandoned village in Nunavut, Canada

Based on archeological finds, Brooman Point Village is an abandoned village in Qikiqtaaluk Region, Nunavut, Canada. It is located in the central High Arctic near Brooman Point (75°23′00″N 097°17′30″W) of the Gregory Peninsula, part of the eastern coast of Bathurst Island. Brooman was both a Late Dorset culture Paleo-Eskimo village as well as an Early Thule culture village. Both the artifacts and the architecture, specifically longhouses, are considered important historical remains of the two cultures. The site shows traces of Palaeo-Eskimo occupations between about 2000 BC and 1 AD, but the major prehistoric settlement occurred from about 900 to 1200 AD.

== History ==
Archaeological excavations have revealed the presence of a late Dorset Palaeo-Eskimo village. The Dorset people inhabited Brooman around 2000 BC to 1 AD. The remains of the village were almost obliterated by early Thule-culture Inuit, who built a village on top of the Dorset site. The Thule people lived in Brooman from about 900 to 1200 AD. Aspects of Early Thule culture as seen in the architecture of a site on Victoria Island, Amundsen Gulf. They incorporated many Dorset artifacts into the wall-fill of their houses, thus preserving them in permafrost. Thule walls were made of whale bones that rested on large porticos. Roofs were shed-like: flat or with a slight slope. Some buildings included a small kitchen. When they abandoned the locality, they left behind stone boxes as well as many carvings depicting humans and animals. These artifacts include one of the largest known collections of Dorset carvings in wood, ivory and antler.

== Dorset Culture ==
Dorset culture, 500 BC-1500 AD, is known archaeologically from most coastal regions of arctic Canada. The Dorset people were descended from Palaeo-Eskimos of the Pre-Dorset Culture. Compared to their ancestors, the Dorset people had a more successful economy and lived in more permanent houses built of snow and turf and heated with soapstone oil lamps. They may also have used dogsleds and kayaks. They lived primarily by hunting sea mammals and were capable of taking animals as large as walrus and narwhal. About 500 BC they moved down the Labrador coast and occupied the island of Newfoundland for about 1000 years. About 1000 AD they were displaced from most arctic regions by an invasion of Thule Inuit from Alaska, but they continued to live in northern Québec and Labrador until approximately 1500 AD.

== Thule Culture ==
Thule culture, 1000-1600 AD, represents the expansion of Alaskan Inuit across arctic Canada about 1000 AD and the gradual displacement of the Dorset Palaeo-Eskimos who occupied the area previously. Thule people brought with them a sophisticated sea-hunting technology that had been developed in the Bering Sea area. They hunted animals as large as bowhead whales and were able to store sufficient food to allow winter occupation of permanent villages composed of houses built from stone, whalebones and turf. Most Thule artifacts were made from bone, antler, ivory and wood; they used few stone tools, preferring cutting edges of metal obtained either from natural deposits or from Greenlandic Norse. Thule culture declined after about 1600 AD from a combination of deteriorating climatic conditions and the introduction of diseases from contact with Europeans, but the people continued to occupy arctic Canada and are directly ancestral to the historic Inuit.

== Palaeo-Eskimo people ==
The term "Palaeo-Eskimo"(palaeo=old) is used to refer to the peoples of the Arctic who lived before the Thule. The Thule were the direct ancestors of the Inuit who now inhabit the Canadian north. Palaeo-Eskimo peoples may be remotely related to the Inuit, but they are not the direct ancestors of any modern Arctic people.
