= Amadjuak =

Former Inuit settlement in Nunavut

- Location within Nunavut
- Coordinates: 64°01′N 072°39′W
- Country: Canada
- Territory: Nunavut
- Region: Qikiqtaaluk
- Island: Baffin Island

Amadjuak (uh-MA-joo-ak) is a former Inuit settlement on southern Baffin Island in the Canadian territory of Nunavut. Amadjuak Bay is 4 km (2.5 mi) south, on Hudson Strait.

== History ==
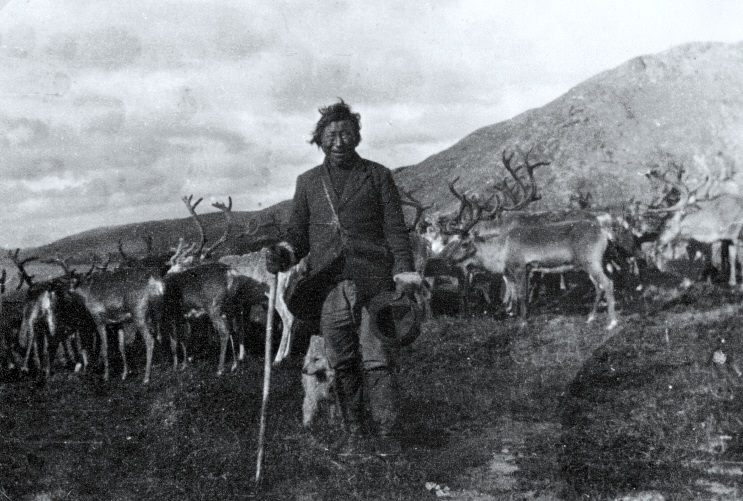
Male Inuk with a herd of reindeer, imported from the Sámi people, in Amadjuak

The Hudson's Bay Company opened a fur trading post (#B380) at Amadjuak in 1921 and it remained in operation through 1933.

== Notable residents ==
The artist, Ningeeuga Oshuitoq, was born at Amadjuak Camp in 1918.
