= Croker Bay =

Bay in Nunavut, Canada

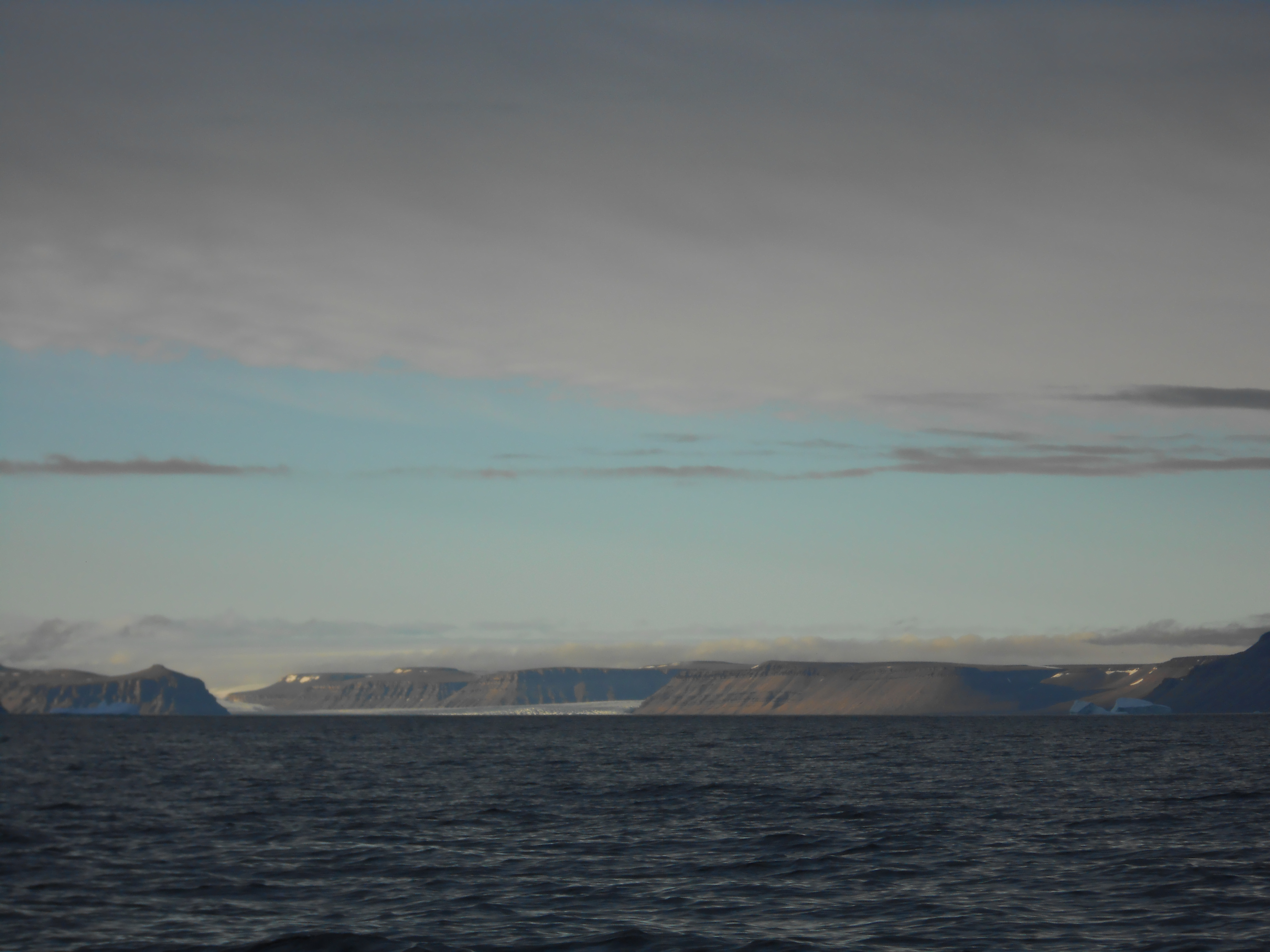
- Croker Bay and glacier seen from the sea

- Location within Nunavut
- Location: Lancaster Sound
- Coordinates: 74°42′N 83°15′W
- Ocean/sea sources: Arctic Ocean
- Basin countries: Canada
- Settlements: Uninhabited

Croker Bay (originally: Croker's Bay) is an Arctic waterway in the Qikiqtaaluk Region, Nunavut, Canada. It lies off the southern coast of Devon Island in the eastern high Arctic. Like Maxwell Bay to the west, it is an arm of Lancaster Sound and Barrow Strait.

The abandoned Dundas Harbour is 32 km (20 mi) to the east.

Croker's Bay was named by William Edward Parry in honour of John Wilson Croker.
