= Port Leopold =

Abandoned trading post in Nunavut, Canada

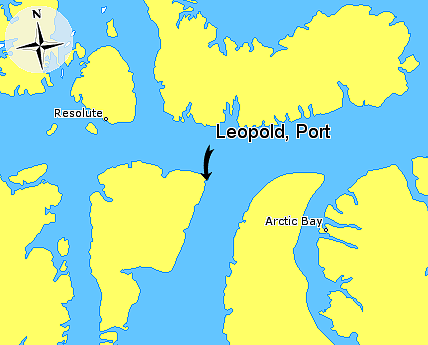
Port Leopold, Somerset Island, Nunavut, Canada.

The locality Port Leopold is an abandoned trading post in the Qikiqtaaluk Region of Nunavut, Canada. It faces Prince Regent Inlet at the northeast tip of Somerset Island.

Elwin Bay^{map} is to the south, while Prince Leopold Island^{map} is to the north.

== History ==
In 1848, the English explorer James Clark Ross wintered here during his search for the missing Franklin expedition.

Later, it became the site of a Hudson's Bay Company trading post.

== Mapping ==
- Elwin Bay, 73°32′N 90°55′W
- Prince Leopold Island, 74°02′N 90°05′W
