= Ungava Bay =

Bay of the Arctic Ocean, Quebec, Canada

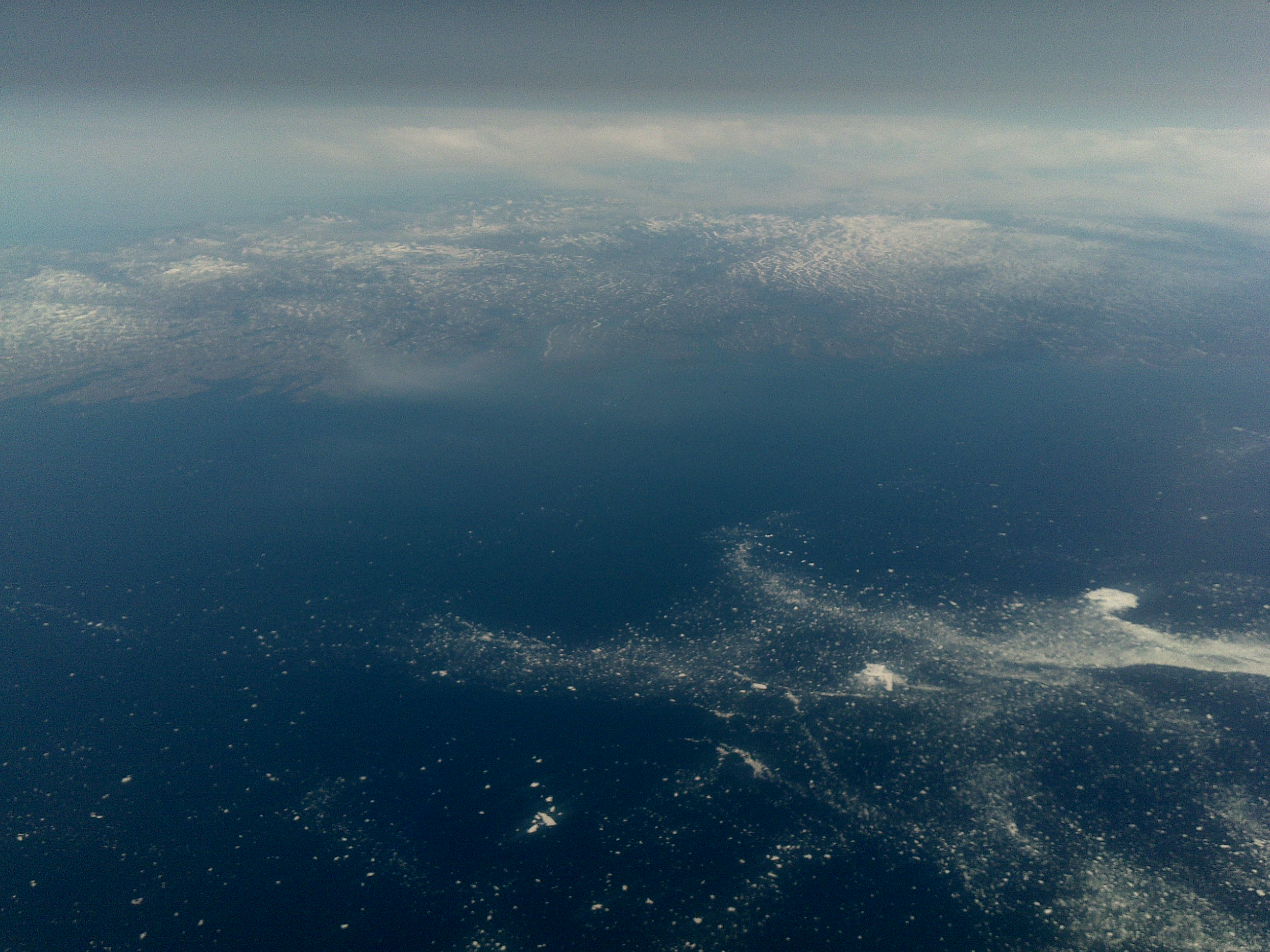
- Aerial view of north-eastern Ungava Bay close to Cape Chidley, seen from north-west towards south-east. In the foreground is drift-ice, in mid-July.

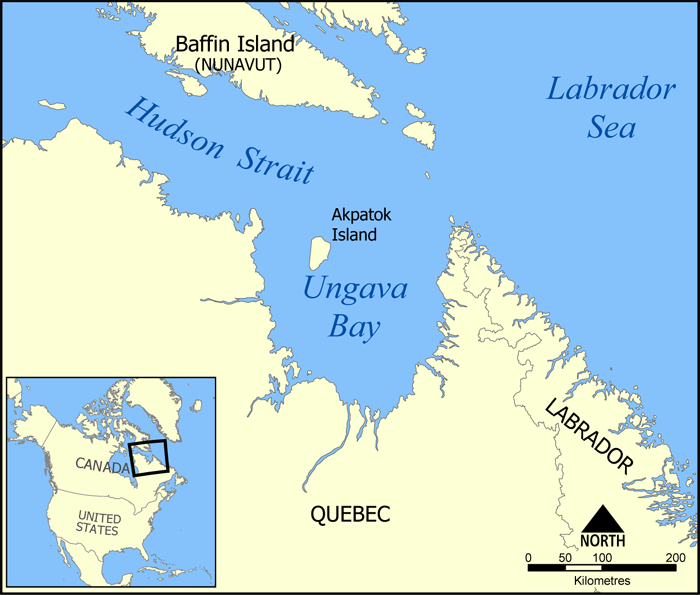

- Location within Nunavut
- Location: Hudson Strait
- Coordinates: 59°30′N 67°30′W
- Ocean/sea sources: Arctic Ocean
- Basin countries: Canada
- Max. length: 320 km (200 mi)
- Max. width: 260 km (160 mi)
- Surface area: c. 50,000 km^{2} (19,000 sq mi)
- References: "Ungava Bay", Encyclopædia Britannica, 15th edition (1992), Vol. 12, p. 129

Ungava Bay (/ʊŋˈɡeɪvə, -ˈɡɑː-/; French: baie d'Ungava, pronounced [bɛ duŋɡava]; Inuktitut: ᐅᖓᕙ ᑲᖏᖅᓗᒃ/ungava kangiqluk, pronounced [u.ŋa.va ka.ŋiq.luk]) is a bay in Nunavut, Canada separating Nunavik (far northern Quebec) from Baffin Island. Although not geographically apparent, it is a marginal sea of the Arctic Ocean. The bay is roughly oval-shaped, about 260 km (160 mi) at its widest point and about 320 km (200 mi) in length; it has an area of approximately 50,000 km^{2} (19,000 sq mi). It is generally fairly shallow, under 150 m (490 ft), though at its border with the Atlantic Ocean depths of almost 300 m (980 ft) are reached.

== Geography ==
Although it is quite close to the open Atlantic (separated only by Hudson Strait), Ungava Bay is part of the Arctic Ocean. Ungava Bay is separated from Hudson Bay by the Ungava Peninsula. Of the many islands in Ungava Bay, Akpatok Island is largest. Bathymetric studies suggest that Ungava Bay may be the remnant of an impact crater (age unknown) approximately 225 km (140 mi) in diameter.

Ungava Bay is an example of a hypertidal coastal system and the southwestern corner of the bay vies with the Bay of Fundy for the highest tidal range in the world. A 16.2m range was recorded in March 2002 at the mouth of the Leaf River on the southwestern margin of the bay and it is predicted that the extreme spring tide range may be 16.8 m (55 ft) (+/- 0.4 m (1 ft 4 in)), just 20cm short of that predicted for Burntcoat Head, Bay of Fundy. Attempts have been made to study the potential for producing electricity using tidal power in the bay, but this is made difficult by the harsh climate and the fact that the bay is ice-free for only a small part of the year.

== Climate ==
Due to the influence of the Labrador Current, summers are too cold for tree growth and all the land surrounding the bay is treeless tundra. Typically, temperatures in summer at Kuujjuaq about 20 km (12 mi) up the Koksoak River are about 7 °C (45 °F), while winter temperatures are about −20 °C (−4 °F). Precipitation averages around 400–450 mm (16–18 in) per year, most of it falling in the summer.

== Human development ==
Ungava Bay is surrounded by numerous Inuit villages, the largest of which is Kuujjuaq, at the mouth of the Koksoak River. Iron ore has been mined in the past, but despite the high grade of the ores, the impossibility of cheap transportation meant that mining was discontinued in 1980. Traditional Inuit hunting activities still dominate the region's life, along with adventure tourism.

== See also ==
- Hudson Bay drainage basin
