= Maxwell Bay =

Bay in Nunavut, Canada

- Location within Nunavut
- Location: Lancaster Sound
- Coordinates: 74°40′00″N 88°48′30″W
- Ocean/sea sources: Arctic Ocean
- Basin countries: Canada
- Settlements: Uninhabited

Maxwell Bay is a waterway in the Qikiqtaaluk Region, Nunavut, Canada. It lies off the southern coast of Devon Island in the eastern high Arctic. Like Croker Bay to the east, it is an arm of Lancaster Sound and Barrow Strait.

Maxwell Bay was named by William Edward Parry in honour of Sir Murray Maxwell.
