= Barrow Strait =

Waterway in Northern Canada's territory of Nunavut

Coordinates: 74°23′N 097°48′W

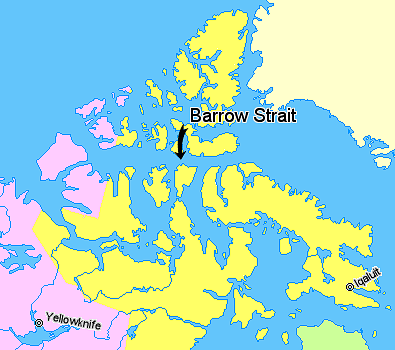
Barrow Strait, Nunavut, Canada. Nunavut Northwest Territories Greenland

Barrow Strait is a shipping waterway in Northern Canada's territory of Nunavut. Forming part of the Parry Channel, the strait separates several large islands including Cornwallis Island and Devon Island to the north, from Prince of Wales Island, Somerset Island, and Prince Leopold Island to the south.

The first 30 mi (48 km) of its eastern section has no islands, commonly does not freeze until the end of November, nor consolidate until the end of December. Garrett Island, Lowther Island, Young Island, Hamilton Island, and Russell Island lie south of Bathurst Island. Browne Island, Somerville Island, and Griffith Island lie southwest of Cornwallis Island. Beechey Island lies off of Devon Island.

From its eastern junction with Lancaster Sound to its western junction with Viscount Melville Sound, the strait measures 170 mi (270 km) long. Its eastern mouth, between Prince Leopold Island, and Cape Hurd on Devon Island, is 28 mi (45 km) wide. Its western mouth, at Cape Cockburn, southwestern Bathurst Island, is 66 mi (106 km) wide.

Habitat for Arctic fox, birds, polar bear, ringed seal, and whales is located along the ice edge, near Leopold Island, while consolidated ice in the strait's central and western sections provides a bridge for caribou crossing.

A strategic waterway from deepwater vessels navigating Arctic waters, the Strait was surveyed in detail by the Soviet Navy during the Cold War.
