= 101st meridian west =

Line of longitude

101st meridian west

The meridian 101° west of Greenwich is a line of longitude that extends from the North Pole across the Arctic Ocean, North America, the Pacific Ocean, the Southern Ocean, and Antarctica to the South Pole.

The 101st meridian west forms a Great ellipse with the 79th meridian east.

== From Pole to Pole ==
Starting at the North Pole and heading south to the South Pole, the 101st meridian west passes through:

Co-ordinates	Country, territory or sea	Notes
90°0′N 101°0′W	Arctic Ocean	
79°45′N 101°0′W	Peary Channel	
78°57′N 101°0′W	Canada	Nunavut — Ellef Ringnes Island
78°10′N 101°0′W	Danish Strait	
77°47′N 101°0′W	Canada	Nunavut — King Christian Island
77°43′N 101°0′W	Unnamed waterbody	
76°43′N 101°0′W	Canada	Nunavut — Helena Island
76°36′N 101°0′W	Sir William Parker Strait	
76°30′N 101°0′W	May Inlet	
76°14′N 101°0′W	Canada	Nunavut — Bathurst Island
75°36′N 101°0′W	Parry Channel	Viscount Melville Sound
73°48′N 101°0′W	Canada	Nunavut — Prince of Wales Island
73°17′N 101°0′W	Ommanney Bay	
72°44′N 101°0′W	Canada	Nunavut — Prince of Wales Island
72°12′N 101°0′W	M'Clintock Channel	Passing just west of Gateshead Island, Nunavut, Canada
70°12′N 101°0′W	Canada	Nunavut — Victoria Island and Qikiqtagafaaluk
69°27′N 101°0′W	Victoria Strait	
69°5′N 101°0′W	Queen Maud Gulf	
67°46′N 101°0′W	Canada	Nunavut; Manitoba — from 60°0′N 101°0′W
49°0′N 101°0′W	United States	North Dakota; South Dakota — from 45°57′N 101°0′W; Nebraska — from 43°0′N 101°0′W; Kansas — from 40°0′N 101°0′W; Oklahoma — from 37°0′N 101°0′W; Texas — from 36°30′N 101°0′W
29°21′N 101°0′W	Mexico	Coahuila; Nuevo León — from 26°32′N 101°0′W; Coahuila — from 26°9′N 101°0′W, passing through Saltillo; Zacatecas — from 24°34′N 101°0′W; San Luis Potosí — from 24°23′N 101°0′W (passing just west of San Luis Potosí city); Guanajuato — from 21°46′N 101°0′W; Michoacán — from 20°4′N 101°0′W; Guerrero — from 18°30′N 101°0′W
17°15′N 101°0′W	Pacific Ocean	
60°0′S 101°0′W	Southern Ocean	
71°52′S 101°0′W	Antarctica	Unclaimed territory

== See also ==
- 100th meridian west
- 102nd meridian west
