= 102nd meridian west =

Line of longitude

102nd meridian west (interactive map)

In Canada, the 102nd meridian west defines part of the border between the Northwest Territories and Nunavut, and it approximately defines part of the border between Saskatchewan and Manitoba.

The meridian 102° west of Greenwich is a line of longitude that extends from the North Pole across the Arctic Ocean, North America, the Pacific Ocean, the Southern Ocean, and Antarctica to the South Pole.

The 102nd meridian west forms a great circle with the 78th meridian east.

In Canada, part of the border between the Northwest Territories and Nunavut is defined by the meridian, and part of the border between Saskatchewan and Manitoba runs about 400m west of the meridian. At the 60th parallel north, these borders form a (possible) quadripoint at the four corners of these provinces and territories. 102°W is the Second Meridian of Canada's Dominion Land Survey.

In the United States, the meridian formed the eastern border of the historic and extralegal Territory of Jefferson. The eastern border of Colorado with Nebraska and Kansas lies on the 25th meridian west from Washington, which lies a couple of miles west of the 102nd meridian west.

== From Pole to Pole ==
Starting at the North Pole and heading south to the South Pole, the 102nd meridian west passes through:

Co-ordinates	Country, territory or sea	Notes
90°0′N 102°0′W	Arctic Ocean	
79°30′N 102°0′W	Peary Channel	
79°5′N 102°0′W	Canada	Nunavut — Ellef Ringnes Island
78°17′N 102°0′W	Danish Strait	
77°53′N 102°0′W	Canada	Nunavut — King Christian Island
77°41′N 102°0′W	Unnamed waterbody	Passing just west of Helena Island, Nunavut, Canada (at 76°35′N 101°41′W)
76°25′N 102°0′W	Canada	Nunavut — Bathurst Island
76°13′N 102°0′W	Erskine Inlet	
75°58′N 102°0′W	Canada	Nunavut — Alexander Island and Bathurst Island
75°33′N 102°0′W	Parry Channel	Viscount Melville Sound
73°4′N 102°0′W	Canada	Nunavut — Prince of Wales Island
72°30′N 102°0′W	M'Clintock Channel	
70°18′N 102°0′W	Canada	Nunavut — Victoria Island
69°51′N 102°0′W	Albert Edward Bay	
69°28′N 102°0′W	Canada	Nunavut — Victoria Island
68°59′N 102°0′W	Queen Maud Gulf	
68°50′N 102°0′W	Canada	Nunavut — Qikiqtaryuaq
68°37′N 102°0′W	Queen Maud Gulf	
67°45′N 102°0′W	Canada	Nunavut; Northwest Territories / Nunavut border — from 64°14′N 102°0′W; Manitoba — from 60°0′N 102°0′W, running about 400m east of, and parallel to, the border with Saskatchewan; Saskatchewan — from 55°47′N 102°0′W
49°0′N 102°0′W	United States	North Dakota; South Dakota — from 45°56′N 102°0′W; Nebraska — from 43°0′N 102°0′W; Kansas — from 40°0′N 102°0′W; Oklahoma — from 37°0′N 102°0′W; Texas — from 36°30′N 102°0′W
29°48′N 102°0′W	Mexico	Coahuila; Zacatecas — from 25°5′N 102°0′W; San Luis Potosí — from 23°24′N 102°0′W; Zacatecas — from 22°40′N 102°0′W; Aguascalientes — from 22°16′N 102°0′W; Jalisco — from 21°53′N 102°0′W; Guanajuato — from 20°56′N 102°0′W; Jalisco — from 20°39′N 102°0′W; Guanajuato — from 20°31′N 102°0′W; Michoacán — from 20°21′N 102°0′W, passing just east of Uruapan; Guerrero — from 18°12′N 102°0′W
17°58′N 102°0′W	Pacific Ocean	
60°0′S 102°0′W	Southern Ocean	
71°58′S 102°0′W	Antarctica	Unclaimed territory

== See also ==
- 101st meridian west
- 103rd meridian west
