= 100th meridian west =

Line of longitude

100th meridian west (interactive map)

The meridian 100° west of the Prime Meridian of Greenwich is a line of longitude that extends from the North Pole across the Arctic Ocean, North America, the Pacific Ocean, the Southern Ocean, and Antarctica to the South Pole. The 100th meridian west forms a great circle with the 80th meridian east.

In the United States, this meridian roughly marks the boundary between the semi-arid climate in the west and the humid continental and humid subtropical climates in the east, and as such roughly connotes the regions of the Eastern and the Western United States.

== From Pole to Pole ==
Starting at the North Pole and heading south to the South Pole, the 100th meridian west passes through:

Co-ordinates	Country, territory or sea	Notes
90°0′N 100°0′W	Arctic Ocean	
80°6′N 100°0′W	Canada	Nunavut — Meighen Island
79°52′N 100°0′W	Peary Channel	
78°44′N 100°0′W	Canada	Nunavut — Ellef Ringnes Island
77°48′N 100°0′W	Unnamed waterbody	
76°45′N 100°0′W	Canada	Nunavut — Berkeley Islands and Bathurst Island
74°59′N 100°0′W	Parry Channel	
73°57′N 100°0′W	Canada	Nunavut — Prince of Wales Island
71°52′N 100°0′W	M'Clintock Channel	
70°35′N 100°0′W	Larsen Sound	Passing just east of Gateshead Island, Nunavut, Canada (at 70°35′N 100°9′W)
69°58′N 100°0′W	Victoria Strait	
69°3′N 100°0′W	Canada	Nunavut — Royal Geographical Society Islands
68°57′N 100°0′W	Queen Maud Gulf	Passing just east of Hat Island, Nunavut, Canada (at 68°18′N 100°2′W)
67°50′N 100°0′W	Canada	Nunavut; Manitoba — from 60°0′N 100°0′W, passing just west of Brandon
49°0′N 100°0′W	United States	North Dakota; South Dakota — from 45°56′N 100°0′W; Nebraska — from 43°0′N 100°0′W; Kansas — from 40°0′N 100°0′W; Oklahoma — from 37°0′N 100°0′W; Texas / Oklahoma border — from 36°30′N 100°0′W; Texas — from 34°34′N 100°0′W
28°0′N 100°0′W	Mexico	Coahuila; Nuevo León — from 27°37′N 100°0′W; Tamaulipas — from 23°24′N 100°0′W; San Luis Potosí — from 23°10′N 100°0′W; Tamaulipas — from 22°54′N 100°0′W; San Luis Potosí — from 22°50′N 100°0′W; Guanajuato — from 21°30′N 100°0′W; Querétaro — from 21°12′N 100°0′W; State of Mexico — from 20°6′N 100°0′W; Guerrero — from 18°35′N 100°0′W, passing just west of Acapulco
16°54′N 100°0′W	Pacific Ocean	
60°0′S 100°0′W	Southern Ocean	
71°55′S 100°0′W	Antarctica	Unclaimed territory

== United States ==
Part of the state line between Texas and Oklahoma is defined by the 100th meridian west

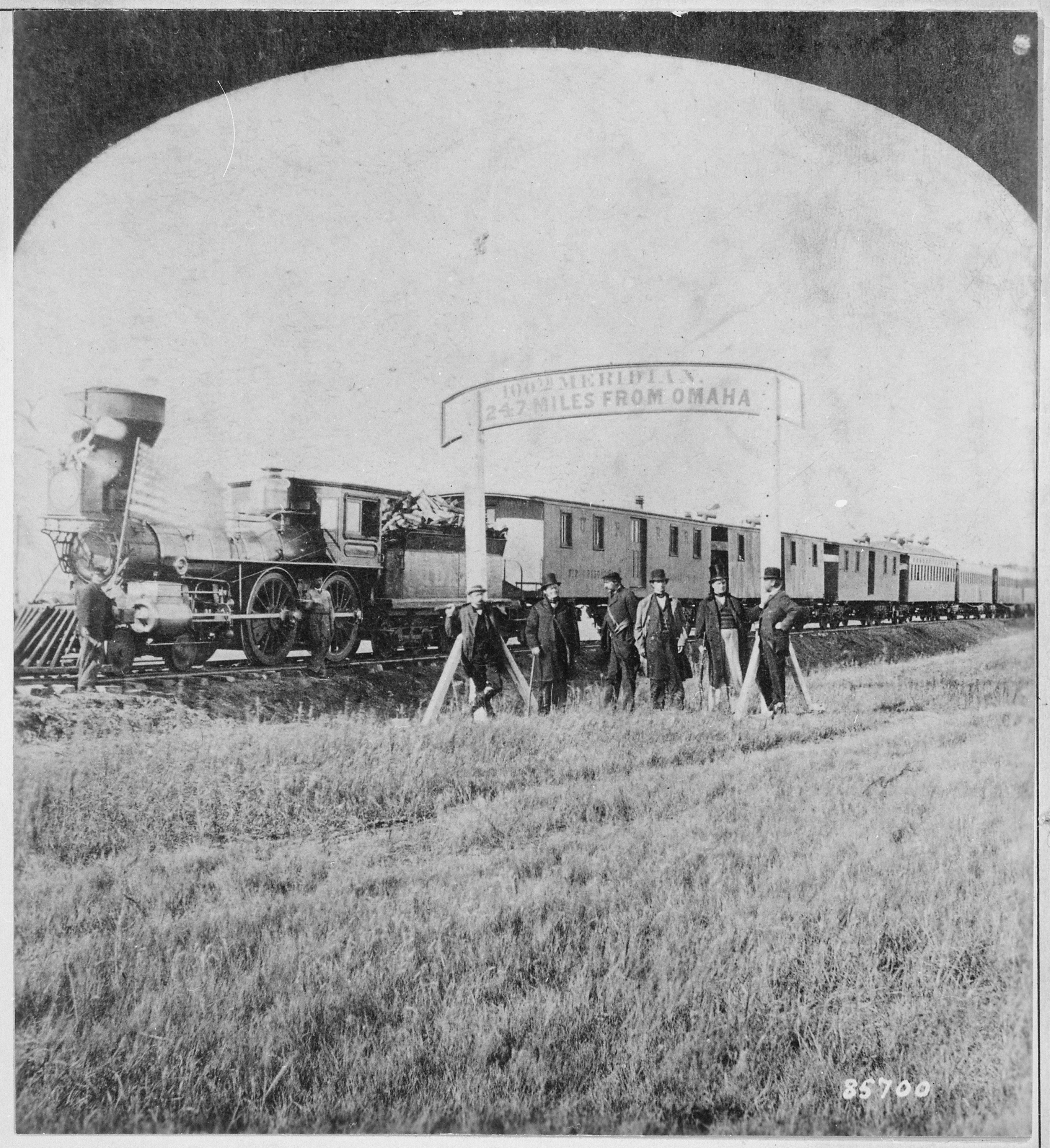
Directors of the Union Pacific Railroad gather on the meridian in the Nebraska Territory at what is now Cozad, Nebraska, in 1866

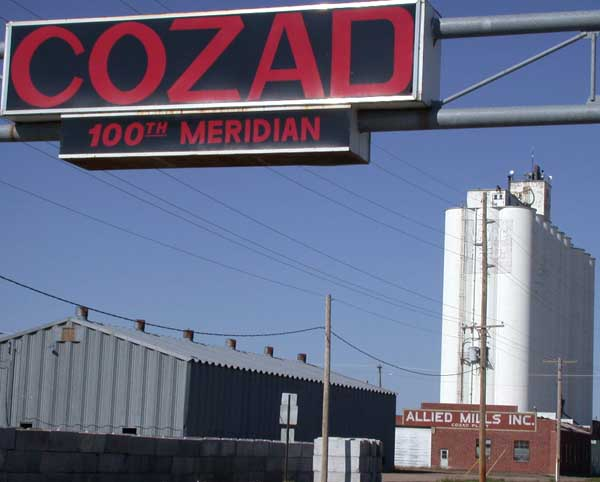
Sign marking the 100th meridian in Cozad, Nebraska; photograph taken 138 years after the preceding photograph in October 2004

In the United States the meridian 100° west of Greenwich forms the eastern border of the Texas panhandle with Oklahoma (which traces its origin to the Adams-Onís Treaty in 1819 which settled the border between New Spain and the United States between the Red River and Arkansas River). Dodge City, Kansas lies exactly at the intersection of the Arkansas River and the 100th meridian.

As first noted by John Wesley Powell in the 1870s, there is a big difference in rainfall by the different sides of the meridian. In the central Great Plains, it roughly marks the western boundary of the normal reach of moist air from the Gulf of Mexico, and the approximate boundary (although some areas do push the boundary slightly farther east) between the semi-arid climate to the west and the humid continental (north of about 37°N) and humid subtropical (south of about 37°N) climates to the east. West of the meridian, raising livestock is much more economically important than east of it, and what agriculture does exist relies heavily on irrigation. Historically, the meridian has often been taken as a rough boundary between the eastern and western United States. White settlement, spreading westward after the American Civil War, settled the area around this meridian during the 1870s.

A sign across U.S. Highway 30 in Cozad, Nebraska, marks the place where the 100th meridian intersects with the routes of the Oregon Trail, Pony Express, transcontinental railroad, and the Lincoln Highway.

== In popular culture ==
The song "At the Hundredth Meridian" by The Tragically Hip is about the 100th meridian west, specifically in Canada, and how it has traditionally been considered "where the Great Plains begin."

Next westward: 101st meridian west	100th meridian west forms a great circle with 80th meridian east	Next eastward: 99th meridian west

== See also ==
- Rain follows the plow
