= 99th meridian west =

Line of longitude

99th meridian west

The meridian 99° west of Greenwich is a line of longitudethat extends from the North Pole across the Arctic Ocean, North America, the Pacific Ocean, the Southern Ocean, and Antarctica to the South Pole.

The 99th meridian west forms a great circle with the 81st meridian east.

== From Pole to Pole ==
Starting at the North Pole and heading south to the South Pole, the 99th meridian west passes through:

| Co-ordinates | Country, territory or sea | Notes |
|---|---|---|
| 90°0′N 99°0′W | Arctic Ocean | |
| 80°6′N 99°0′W | Canada | Nunavut — Meighen Island |
| 79°43′N 99°0′W | Peary Channel | |
| 78°49′N 99°0′W | Hassel Sound | |
| 78°5′N 99°0′W | Canada | Nunavut — Ellef Ringnes Island |
| 77°53′N 99°0′W | Unnamed waterbody | |
| 76°40′N 99°0′W | Canada | Nunavut — Ricards Island and Bathurst Island |
| 75°0′N 99°0′W | Parry Channel | Passing just west of Young Island, Nunavut, Canada (at 74°18′N 98°50′W); Passing just east of Hamilton Island, Nunavut, Canada (at 74°11′N 99°8′W) |
| 73°59′N 99°0′W | Canada | Nunavut — Russell Island, Mecham Island and Prince of Wales Island |
| 71°24′N 99°0′W | Larsen Sound | |
| 69°58′N 99°0′W | Victoria Strait | |
| 69°9′N 99°0′W | Canada | Nunavut — King William Island |
| 68°56′N 99°0′W | Queen Maud Gulf | |
| 68°4′N 99°0′W | Canada | Nunavut — O'Reilly Island |
| 68°1′N 99°0′W | Queen Maud Gulf | |
| 67°43′N 99°0′W | Canada | Nunavut; Manitoba — from 60°0′N 99°0′W, passing through Lake Winnipeg |
| 49°0′N 99°0′W | United States | North Dakota; South Dakota — from 45°56′N 99°0′W; Nebraska — from 43°0′N 99°0′W; Kansas — from 40°0′N 99°0′W; Oklahoma — from 37°0′N 99°0′W; Texas — from 34°13′N 99°0′W |
| 26°23′N 99°0′W | Mexico | Tamaulipas; Nuevo León — from 26°5′N 99°0′W; Tamaulipas — from 25°4′N 99°0′W; San Luis Potosí — from 22°34′N 99°0′W; Hidalgo — from 21°17′N 99°0′W; State of Mexico — from 20°2′N 99°0′W; Hidalgo — from 19°53′N 99°0′W; State of Mexico — from 19°49′N 99°0′W; Mexico City — from 19°22′N 99°0′W; Morelos — from 19°5′N 99°0′W; Puebla — from 18°23′N 99°0′W; Guerrero — from 18°15′N 99°0′W |
| 16°35′N 99°0′W | Pacific Ocean | |
| 60°0′S 99°0′W | Southern Ocean | |
| 71°40′S 99°0′W | Antarctica | Unclaimed territory |

== See also ==
- 98th meridian west
- 100th meridian west
