= 98th meridian west =

Line of longitude

98th meridian west (interactive map)

The meridian 98° west of Greenwich is a line of longitude that extends from the North Pole across the Arctic Ocean, North America, the Pacific Ocean, the Southern Ocean, and Antarctica to the South Pole.

The 98th meridian west forms a great circle with the 82nd meridian east.

== From Pole to Pole ==
Starting at the North Pole and heading south to the South Pole, the 98th meridian west passes through:

Co-ordinates	Country, territory or sea	Notes
90°0′N 98°0′W	Arctic Ocean	Passing just west of the Fay Islands, Nunavut, Canada (at 79°35′N 97°40′W)
78°49′N 98°0′W	Canada	Nunavut — Amund Ringnes Island
78°17′N 98°0′W	Hassel Sound	
77°50′N 98°0′W	Unnamed waterbody	
76°34′N 98°0′W	Canada	Nunavut — Loney Island and Bathurst Island
75°1′N 98°0′W	Parry Channel	Passing just east of Garrett Island, Nunavut, Canada (at 74°45′N 98°8′W); Passing just west of Lowther Island, Nunavut, Canada (at 74°29′N 97°47′W)
74°7′N 98°0′W	Canada	Nunavut — Russell Island and Prince of Wales Island
71°40′N 98°0′W	Larsen Sound	
69°54′N 98°0′W	Canada	Nunavut — King William Island
68°42′N 98°0′W	Simpson Strait	
68°32′N 98°0′W	Canada	Nunavut; Manitoba — from 60°0′N 98°0′W, passing through Lake Winnipeg
49°0′N 98°0′W	United States	North Dakota; South Dakota — from 45°56′N 98°0′W; Nebraska — from 42°46′N 98°0′W; Kansas — from 40°0′N 98°0′W; Oklahoma — from 37°0′N 98°0′W; Texas — from 34°0′N 98°0′W, passing through the West Pole in Bee Cave, Texas
26°3′N 98°0′W	Mexico	Tamaulipas; Veracruz — from 22°21′N 98°0′W; Hidalgo — from 20°36′N 98°0′W; Puebla — from 20°28′N 98°0′W; Tlaxcala — from 19°38′N 98°0′W; Puebla — from 19°13′N 98°0′W; Oaxaca — from 17°59′N 98°0′W
16°7′N 98°0′W	Pacific Ocean	
60°0′S 98°0′W	Southern Ocean	
71°48′S 98°0′W	Antarctica	Unclaimed territory

== United States ==
In his classic study of the Great Plains, Walter Prescott Webb described the 98th meridian as the dividing line between the arid western United States and the humid eastern United States:

As one contrasts the civilization of the Great Plains with that of the eastern timberland, one sees what may be called an institutional fault (comparable to a geological fault) running from middle Texas to Illinois or Dakota, roughly following the ninety-eighth meridian. At this fault the ways of life and of living changed. Practically every institution that was carried across it was either broken and remade or else greatly altered.

More commonly, the 100th meridian is cited as the approximate dividing line, following the earlier observations of John Wesley Powell in the late 1800s.

== See also ==
- 97th meridian west
- 99th meridian west
