= Evans Bay (Nunavut) =

Uninhabited bay in Nunavut, Canada

- Location within Nunavut
- Location: Erskine Inlet
- Coordinates: 76°16′N 102°12′W
- Ocean/sea sources: Arctic Ocean
- Basin countries: Canada
- Settlements: Uninhabited

Evans Bay is an Arctic waterway in the Qikiqtaaluk Region, Nunavut, Canada. Located off northwestern Bathurst Island, the bay is on the east side of Erskine Inlet, across from Île Vanier.

Other bays in the area include Dampier Bay and Cameron Bay.
