= Dampier Bay =

Bay in Nunavut, Canada

- Location within Nunavut
- Location: May Inlet
- Coordinates: 76°15′N 101°04′W
- Ocean/sea sources: Arctic Ocean
- Basin countries: Canada
- Settlements: Uninhabited

Dampier Bay is an Arctic waterway in the Qikiqtaaluk Region, Nunavut, Canada. Located off northwestern Bathurst Island, the bay is on the west side of May Inlet.

Other bays in the area include Evans Bay, Purcell Bay, Stuart Bay, Shamrock Bay, and Half Moon Bay.
