= Shamrock Bay =

Bay in Nunavut, Canada

- Location within Nunavut
- Location: Sir William Parker Strait
- Coordinates: 76°37′N 99°55′W
- Ocean/sea sources: Arctic Ocean
- Basin countries: Canada
- Settlements: Uninhabited

Shamrock Bay is an Arctic waterway in the Qikiqtaaluk Region, Nunavut, Canada. Located off northwestern Bathurst Island, the bay is on the south side of Sir William Parker Strait. Other bays in the area include Purcell Bay and Dampier Bay.
