= Half Moon Bay (Nunavut) =

Bay in Nunavut, Canada

- Location within Nunavut
- Location: May Inlet
- Coordinates: 76°02′N 100°00′W
- Ocean/sea sources: Arctic Ocean
- Basin countries: Canada
- Settlements: Uninhabited

Half Moon Bay is an Arctic waterway in Qikiqtaaluk Region, Nunavut, Canada. Located off northwestern Bathurst Island, the bay is on the east side of May Inlet. Other bays in the area include Purcell Bay, Dampier Bay, and Stuart Bay.
