= Young Inlet =

Arctic waterway in Canada

- Location within Nunavut
- Location: Sir William Parker Strait
- Coordinates: 76°33′N 99°15′W
- Ocean/sea sources: Arctic Ocean
- Basin countries: Canada
- Settlements: Uninhabited

Young Inlet is an Arctic waterway in Qikiqtaaluk Region, Nunavut, Canada. It is a natural bay in Sir William Parker Strait by northeastern Bathurst Island. The inlet is part of Qausuittuq National Park.

== Geography ==
Notable landforms include: Emma Point to the west, Annie Point to the south, and Cracroft Sound to the east. The inlet contains one unnamed island. The Berkeley Islands are to the north and northwest.
