= Robert Aldrich (disambiguation) =

Robert Aldrich (1918–1983) was an American film director

Robert Aldrich may also refer to:

- Robert Aldrich (bishop) (died 1555), bishop of Carlisle
- Robert Aldrich (historian) (born 1954), Australian historian
- Robert Dawes Aldrich, Royal Navy admiral and polar explorer

== See also ==
- Robert Andrich (born 1994), German footballer
