= Thor Island =

Thor Island may refer to:

- Thor Island (Antarctica)
- Thor Island (Nunavut)
