= W 101 =

W 101 may refer to:

- 101st meridian west, a line of latitude 101° west of the Mediterranean Sea
- SS W 101, a dredger hopper ship in service 1944–47
