= Seymour Island (disambiguation) =

Seymour Island usually refers to an island off the tip of the Graham Land in Antarctica.

Seymour Island may also refer to:

- Seymour Island (Nunavut), an uninhabited island in the Qikiqtaaluk Region of northern Canada's territory of Nunavut
- North Seymour Island, formerly Seymour Island, an uninhabited island in the Galápagos Islands in Ecuador
- Baltra Island, formerly South Seymour Island, a small island in the Galápagos Islands in Ecuador
  - Seymour Airport, formerly Seymour Island Airfield, an airport on Baltra
- Seymour Island in Billington Sea, Plymouth, Massachusetts, U.S.A.
- Seymour Island in Doubtful Sound, South Island, New Zealand
