= Fredrikshald =

Fredrikshald may refer to:

- Fredrikshald Bay, Nunavut, Canada
- Fredrikshald, Norway, former name of the town of Halden
