= Erasmus Ommanney =

Royal Navy Admiral and Arctic explorer (1814–1904)

Admiral Erasmus Ommanney KCB FRS FRGS FRAS JP
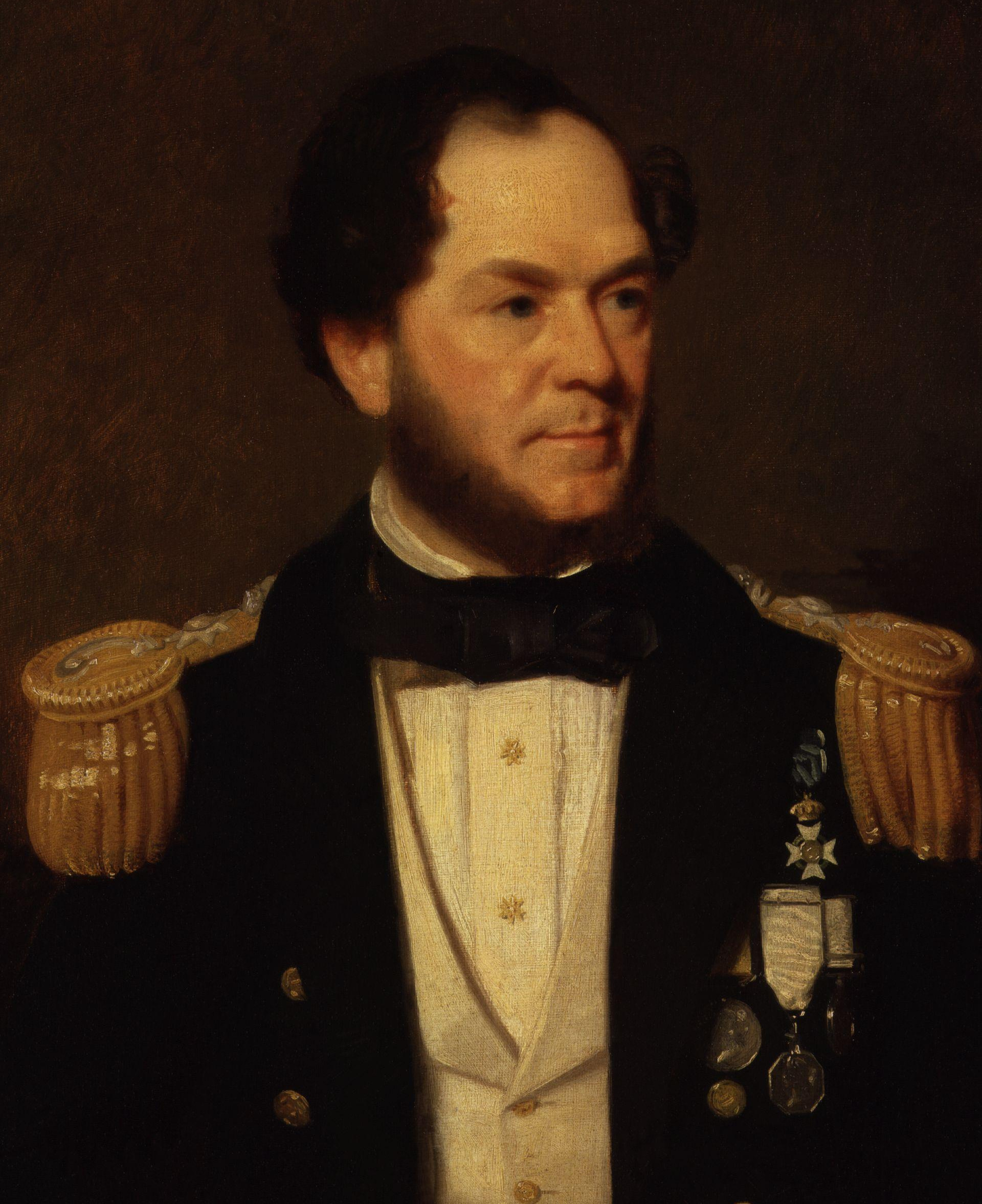
- Portrait by Stephen Pearce
- Born: 22 May 1814; London, Middlesex, England
- Died: 21 December 1904 (aged 90); Southsea, Hampshire, England
- Burial place: Old Mortlake Cemetery
- Military career
- Allegiance: United Kingdom
- Branch: Royal Navy
- Service years: 1826–1875
- Rank: Admiral
- Wars: Greek Revolution; Crimean War
- Awards: Knight Commander of the Order of the Bath (1902)

Sir Erasmus Ommanney KCB FRS FRGS FRAS JP (22 May 1814 – 21 December 1904) was a Royal Navy officer and an Arctic explorer of the Victorian era.

== Early life ==
He was born in London in 1814, the seventh son in a family of eight sons and three daughters of Sir Francis Molyneux Ommanney (1774–1840), a naval agent and from 1818 to 1826 MP for Barnstaple, and his wife, Georgiana Frances, daughter of Joshua Hawkes. He was named after Admiral Sir Erasmus Gower who had mentored his uncle Admiral Sir John Acworth Ommanney. The Ommanneys had long distinguished themselves in the Royal Navy, Ommanney's grandfather being Rear Admiral Cornthwaite Ommanney (d. 1801), and his uncles were Admiral Sir John Acworth Ommanney and Admiral Henry Manaton Ommanney. Major General Edward Lacon Ommanney Royal Engineers was his eldest brother and Prebendary George Druce Wynne Ommanney was a younger brother.

== Naval career ==
Ommanney entered the Royal Navy aged 12 in August 1826 under his uncle, Captain John Ommanney, the captain of HMS Albion, which in December 1826 convoyed to Lisbon the troops sent to protect Portugal against the Spanish invasion. The ship then went to the Mediterranean, and on 20 October 1827 Ommanney took part in the Battle of Navarino aged just 13. The captured flag of the Turkish Commander-in-Chief was handed down by seniority among the surviving officers until 1890, when Ommanney, the sole survivor of the action, presented it to King George I of Greece.

Having passed his naval examination in 1833, Ommanney served for a short period as mate in the brig HMS Pantaloon. On 10 December 1835 he was promoted lieutenant, and in the same month was appointed to the transport ship HMS Cove, which was ordered to Baffin Bay to release a number of whalers caught in the ice. He received the special commendation of the Admiralty for this dangerous service. In October 1836 he joined the frigate HMS Pique, and a year later he was appointed to HMS Donegal as flag-lieutenant to his uncle, now Sir John Ommanney, Commander-in-Chief on the Lisbon and Mediterranean stations.

Ommanney was promoted commander on 9 October 1840, and from August 1841 to the end of 1844 served on board the steam sloop HMS Vesuvius in the Mediterranean Sea. Here he was employed on the coast of Morocco for the protection of British subjects during the French hostilities, which included the bombardment of Tangier by the Prince de Joinville's naval squadron. Ommanney was promoted captain on 9 November 1846, and from 1847 to 1848 was employed under the government commission during the Irish Famine, carrying into effect relief measures and the new poor law. In 1845 Ommanney was elected a Fellow of the Royal Geographical Society, and on 4 June 1848 he was elected a Fellow of the Royal Society (FRS).

When Captain Horatio Austin was appointed to command HMS Resolute during the Franklin search expedition in February 1850, he chose his friend Ommanney as second in command. The Resolute and Ommanney's ship, HMS Assistance, each had a steam tender (Pioneer and Intrepid). The expedition also organized an extensive system of sledge journeys, by which means the coast of Prince of Wales Island was surveyed. On 25 August 1850 Ommanney discovered the first traces of the fate of Sir John Franklin, which proved that his ships had wintered at Beechey Island when he discovered "fragments of stores and ragged clothing and the remains of an encampment". On the headland of nearby Beechey Island, Ommanney found a large cairn. More relics were scattered nearby but, although the cairn was dismantled, no further traces of the ill-fated expedition were to be found. The expedition returned to England in October 1851.

In December 1851 Ommanney was appointed Deputy Controller-General of HM Coastguard, holding this position until the Crimean War of 1854, when he commissioned HMS Eurydice as senior officer of a small squadron in the White Sea, where he blockaded Archangel, stopping the coasting trade, and destroyed Russian Government property. His White Sea service ended in a battle between his squadron and a Solovetsky Monastery. Ommanney's service in the Baltic was marked by his aggressive operations against Russian shore positions and gunboats, summoning defenceless towns to surrender, and his exaggerated reports of successes.

On 14 January 1853 Ommanney was elected a Fellow of the Royal Astronomical Society.

On 27 February 1844 he married Amelia (Emily) Mary (d. 17 May 1857), the daughter of Samuel Smith of HM Dockyard, Malta. Their son Erasmus Austin Ommanney joined the Royal Navy in 1863, retired with the rank of commander in 1879, took holy orders in 1883, and was vicar of St Michael's, Southsea, from 1892 to 1911.

== Later years ==
Ommanney married Mary Stone in 1862. She died on 1 September 1906, aged 81. In March 1867 he was appointed Knight of the Order of the Bath. On 14 July 1871 Ommanney was promoted to vice admiral, retiring on 1 January 1875. He was promoted to admiral on the retired list on 1 August 1877, in which year he was knighted for his scientific work in the Arctic. He had been elected FRS in 1868 for the same reason, and to the end of his life continued to take a great interest in geographical work and service subjects. He attended meetings of the Royal Geographical Society and the Royal United Service Institution, and for many years he was a councillor of both bodies, and of the British Association for the Advancement of Science. He was also a JP for Hampshire.

Following the succession of King Edward VII, he was among several retired admirals appointed to advancement as Knights Commander of the Order of the Bath in the 1902 Coronation Honours list published on 26 June 1902, and was appointed Knight Commander (KCB) in an investiture on board the royal yacht Victoria and Albert outside Cowes on 15 August 1902, the day before the fleet review held there to mark the coronation.

Ommanney died on 21 December 1904 at his son's home, St Michael's vicarage, St Michael's Road, Southsea, Hampshire, and was buried in Old Mortlake Burial Ground, which is now in the London Borough of Richmond upon Thames.

Ommanney Bay on the west side of Prince of Wales Island in the Canadian Arctic, and Erasmus Ommanney Island (Russian: Остров Оммани, Ostrov Ommani), a small crescent-shaped island located 11 kilometres (6.8 mi) off the northwestern tip of Jackson Island in Arctic Russia, are named after him.

== See also ==
- O'Byrne, William Richard (1849). "Ommanney, Erasmus" . A Naval Biographical Dictionary . John Murray – via Wikisource.
