= Pell Inlet =

Coordinates: 75°48′N 102°26′W

Pell Inlet is a waterway in the Qikiqtaaluk Region of Nunavut, Canada. It separates Alexander Island (to the north) from Bathurst Island (to the south). To the west, the strait opens into the Byam Martin Channel, and to the east it opens into the Erskine Inlet.
