= Boyer Strait =

Strait in Nunavut, Canada

Coordinates: 75°55′N 103°0′W

Boyer Strait is a waterway in the Qikiqtaaluk Region of Nunavut, Canada. It separates Massey Island (to the north) from Alexander Island (to the south). Île Marc is located at the western end of the strait, beyond which it opens into the Byam Martin Channel. To the east it opens into the Erskine Inlet.

"Boyer Strait" is named in honour of Marc Boyer who served as deputy-minister of the federal department of Mines & Technical Surveys from 1950 until his premature death in 1962.
