= Stuart Bay =

Bay in Nunavut, Canada

- Location within Nunavut
- Location: May Inlet
- Coordinates: 76°09′10″N 99°48′25″W
- Ocean/sea sources: Arctic Ocean
- Basin countries: Canada
- Settlements: Uninhabited

Stuart Bay is an Arctic waterway in the Qikiqtaaluk Region, Nunavut, Canada. Located off northwestern Bathurst Island, the bay is on the east side of May Inlet.

Other bays in the area include Purcell Bay, Dampier Bay, and Half Moon Bay.

== Geology ==
The Stuart Bay Formation is characterized by limestone and interbedded sandstone.
