= Cameron Bay =

Bay in Nunavut, Canada

- Location within Nunavut
- Location: Arctic Ocean
- Coordinates: 76°32′N 103°23′W
- Ocean/sea sources: Arctic Ocean
- Basin countries: Canada
- Settlements: Uninhabited

Cameron Bay is an Arctic waterway in the Qikiqtaaluk Region, Nunavut, Canada. Located off northeastern Cameron Island, the bay is an arm of the Arctic Ocean. Evans Bay is nearby.
