= 82nd meridian =

82nd meridian may refer to:

- 82nd meridian east, a line of longitude east of the Greenwich Meridian
- 82nd meridian west, a line of longitude west of the Greenwich Meridian

| 82nd meridian west | 82nd meridian east |
