= Purcell Bay =

Bay in Nunavut, Canada

- Location within Nunavut
- Location: May Inlet
- Coordinates: 76°19′45″N 100°20′20″W
- Basin countries: Canada
- Settlements: Uninhabited

Purcell Bay is an Arctic waterway in the Qikiqtaaluk Region, Nunavut, Canada. Located off northwestern Bathurst Island, the bay is an arm of May Inlet.

Other bays in the area include Dampier Bay, Stuart Bay, Shamrock Bay, and Half Moon Bay.
