= Pearse Strait =

Strait in Nunavut, Canada

Coordinates: 76°2′30″N 103°11′0″W

Pearse Strait is a waterway in the Qikiqtaaluk Region of Nunavut, Canada. It separates Île Vanier (to the north) from Massey Island (to the south). To the west, the strait opens into the Byam Martin Channel, and to the east it opens into the Erskine Inlet.
