= 81st meridian east =

Line of longitude

81st meridian east

The meridian 81° east of Greenwich is a line of longitude that extends from the North Pole across the Arctic Ocean, Asia, the Indian Ocean, the Southern Ocean, and Antarctica to the South Pole.

The 81st meridian east forms a great circle with the 99th meridian west.

== From Pole to Pole ==
Starting at the North Pole and heading south to the South Pole, the 81st meridian east passes through:

Co-ordinates	Country, territory or sea	Notes
90°0′N 81°0′E	Arctic Ocean	
81°7′N 81°0′E	Kara Sea	
73°34′N 81°0′E	Russia	Krasnoyarsk Krai
72°24′N 81°0′E	Yenisei Gulf	
71°56′N 81°0′E	Russia	Krasnoyarsk Krai; Yamalo-Nenets Autonomous Okrug — from 69°12′N 81°0′E; Khanty-Mansi Autonomous Okrug — from 63°9′N 81°0′E; Tomsk Oblast — from 60°46′N 81°0′E; Novosibirsk Oblast — from 56°31′N 81°0′E; Altai Krai — from 54°17′N 81°0′E
51°12′N 81°0′E	Kazakhstan	East Kazakhstan, Almaty Region
45°10′N 81°0′E	People's Republic of China	Xinjiang; Tibet — from 35°19′N 81°0′E
30°16′N 81°0′E	India	Uttarakhand — for about 7 km
30°12′N 81°0′E	Nepal	Sudurpashchim Pradesh
28°27′N 81°0′E	India	Uttar Pradesh, passing just east of Lucknow at 26°51′N 80°57′E; Madhya Pradesh — from 24°56′N 81°0′E; Chhattisgarh — from 22°7′N 81°0′E; Telangana — from 17°53′N 81°0′E; Andhra Pradesh — from 17°11′N 81°0′E
15°44′N 81°0′E	Indian Ocean	Bay of Bengal
8°56′N 81°0′E	Sri Lanka	Eastern Province, North Central Province, Uva, Southern Province
6°6′N 81°0′E	Indian Ocean	
60°0′S 81°0′E	Southern Ocean	
67°52′S 81°0′E	Antarctica	Australian Antarctic Territory, claimed by Australia

== See also ==
- 80th meridian east
- 82nd meridian east
