= Île Marc =

Island in Nunavut, Canada

- Location within Nunavut Location within Canada

Geography
- Location: Northern Canada
- Coordinates: 75°51′N 103°35′W
- Archipelago: Queen Elizabeth Islands; Arctic Archipelago
- Area: 56 km^{2} (22 sq mi)

Administration
- Canada
- Territory: Nunavut

Demographics
- Population: Uninhabited

Île Marc is one of the Canadian arctic islands in Nunavut, Canada. It lies in the Boyer Strait, south of Massey Island, and north-west of Alexander Island.

"Ile Marc" is named to honour Marc Boyer who served as deputy-minister of the federal department of Mines & Technical Surveys from 1950 until his premature death in 1962.
