= Erskine Inlet =

Inlet in Nunavut, Canada

The Erskine Inlet (76°2′N 102°05′W) is a natural waterway through the central Canadian Arctic Archipelago in Canada. It separates Cameron Island, Île Vanier, Massey Island and Alexander Island (to the west) from Bathurst Island (to the south and east).
