= Arnott Strait =

Waterway near Nunavut, Canada

Coordinates: 76°18′N 103°34′W

Location in Nunavut

Arnott Strait is a waterway in the Qikiqtaaluk Region of Nunavut, Canada. It separates Cameron Island (to the north) from Île Vanier (to the south). To the west, the strait opens into the Byam Martin Channel.
