= Stokes Range =

Mountain range in Nunavut, Canada

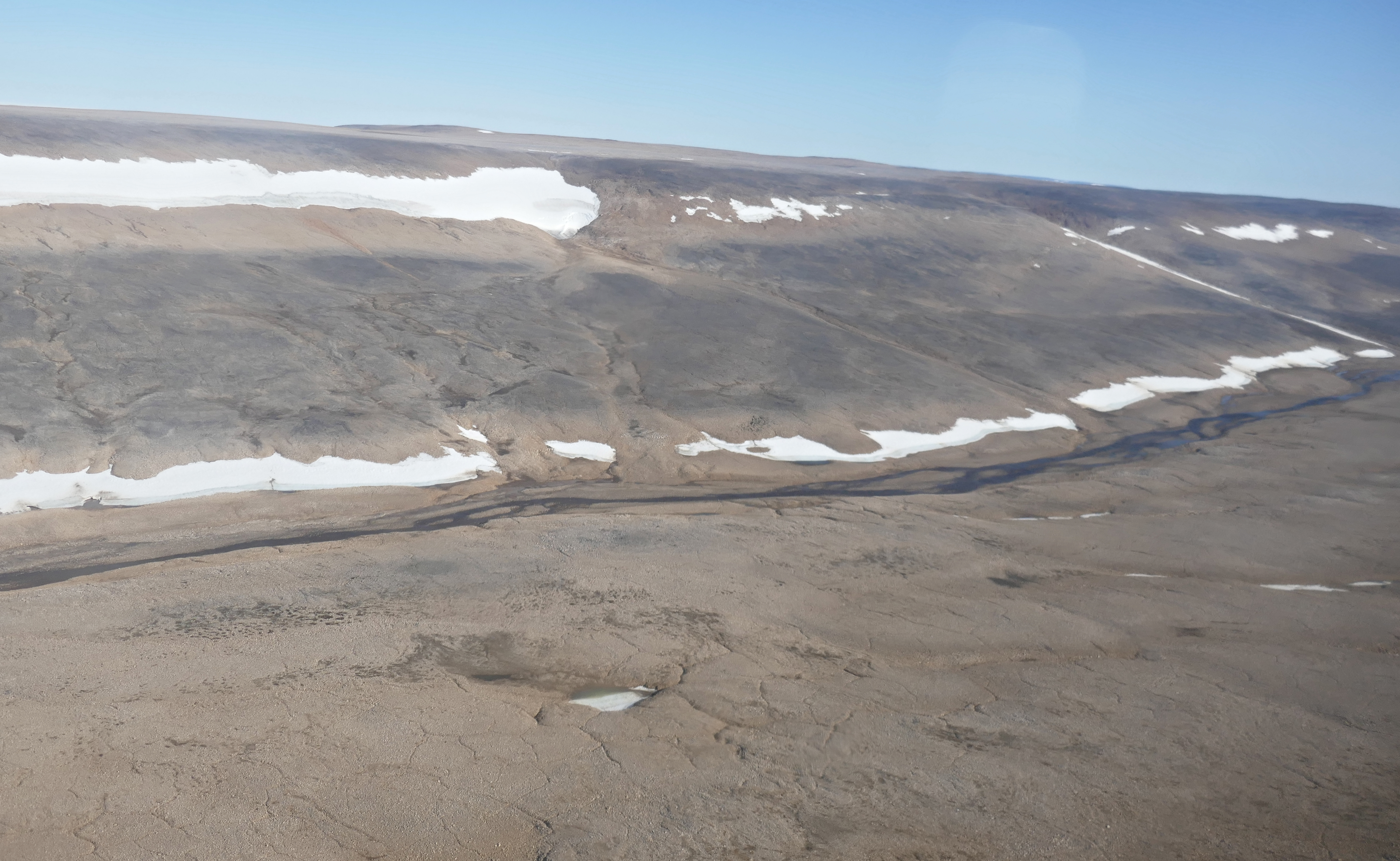
- Qausuittuq National Park, Bathurst Island, Nunavut - July 2016

Highest point
- Peak: Stokes Mountain
- Elevation: 412 m (1,352 ft)
- Coordinates: 76°23′06.0″N 101°39′06.1″W

Geography
- Location within Nunavut
- Country: Canada
- Territory: Nunavut
- Range coordinates: 76°31′N 100°07′W
- Parent range: Arctic Cordillera

The Stokes Range is a mountain range on Bathurst Island, Nunavut, Canada. The range is one of the northernmost ranges in the world and of the Arctic Cordillera. Its highest point is 412 m (1,352 ft) at Stokes Mountain.

== See also ==
- List of mountain ranges
