= Fredrikshald Bay =

Bay in Nunavut, Canada

- Location within Nunavut
- Location: M'Clintock Channel
- Coordinates: 71°20′N 104°22′W
- Basin countries: Canada
- Settlements: Uninhabited

Fredrikshald Bay (variant, Fredrikshalds Bay) is an Arctic waterway in the Kitikmeot Region, Nunavut, Canada. It is located in western M'Clintock Channel off the eastern coast of Victoria Island. It is situated north of Isachsen Point, and 26.8 km (16.7 mi) from Norway Bay.
