= Humid continental climate =

Category in the Köppen climate classification system

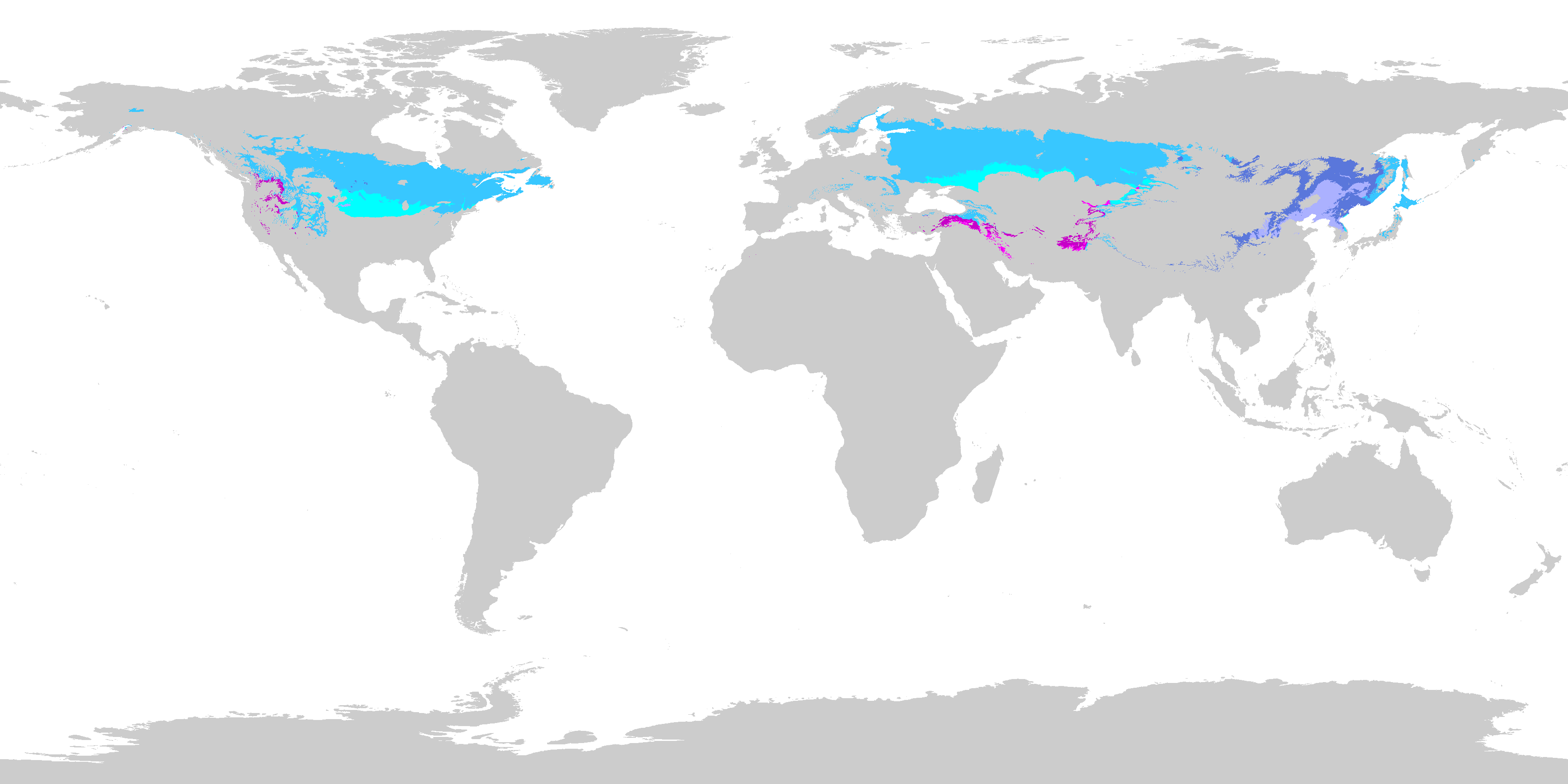
Humid continental climate worldwide as of 1991-2020, utilizing the Köppen climate classification with the −3 °C (27 °F) threshold for the coldest month. Dfa Dfb Dwa Dwb Dsa Dsb

A humid continental climate is a climatic region defined by Russo-German climatologist Wladimir Köppen in 1900, typified by four distinct seasons and large seasonal temperature differences, with warm to hot (and often humid) summers, and cold (sometimes severely cold in the northern areas) and snowy winters. Precipitation is usually distributed throughout the year, but often these regions do have dry seasons. The definition of this climate in terms of temperature is as follows: the mean temperature of the coldest month must be below 0 °C (32.0 °F) or −3 °C (26.6 °F) depending on the isotherm, and there must be at least four months whose mean temperatures are at or above 10 °C (50 °F). In addition, the location in question must not be semi-arid or arid. The cooler Dfb, Dwb, and Dsb subtypes are also known as hemiboreal climates. Although amount of snowfall is not a factor used in defining the humid continental climate, snow during the winter in this type of climate is almost a guarantee, either intermittently throughout the winter months near the southern or coastal margins, or persistently throughout the winter months elsewhere in the climate zone.

Humid continental climates are generally found between latitudes 40° N and 60° N, within the central and northeastern portions of North America, Europe, and Asia. Occasionally, they can also be found at higher elevations above other more temperate climate types. They are rare in the Southern Hemisphere, limited to isolated high altitude locations, due to the larger ocean area at that latitude, smaller land mass, and the consequent greater maritime moderation.

In the Northern Hemisphere, some of the humid continental climates, typically in around Hokkaido, Sakhalin Island, northeastern mainland Europe, Scandinavia, Nova Scotia, and Newfoundland are closer to the sea and heavily maritime-influenced and comparable to oceanic climates, with relatively cool summers, significant year-round precipitation (including high amounts of snow) and winters being just below the freezing mark (too cold for such a classification).

More extreme and inland humid continental climates, sometimes known as "hyper-continental" climates, are found in northeast China, southern Siberia, Mongolia, Kazakhstan, most of the southern interior of Canada, and the Upper Midwest, where temperatures in the winter resemble those of adjacent subarctic climates (with long, drier, generally very cold winters) but have longer and generally warmer summers (in occasional cases, hot summers). A more moderate variety, found in places like Honshu, east-central China, the Korean Peninsula, parts of Eastern Europe, parts of southern Ontario, much of the American Midwest, and the Northeast US, the climate combines hotter summer maxima and greater humidity (similar to those found in adjacent humid subtropical climates) and moderately cold winters and more intermittent snow cover (averaging somewhat below freezing, too cold for a more temperate classification), and is less extreme than the most inland hyper-continental variety.

== Definition ==
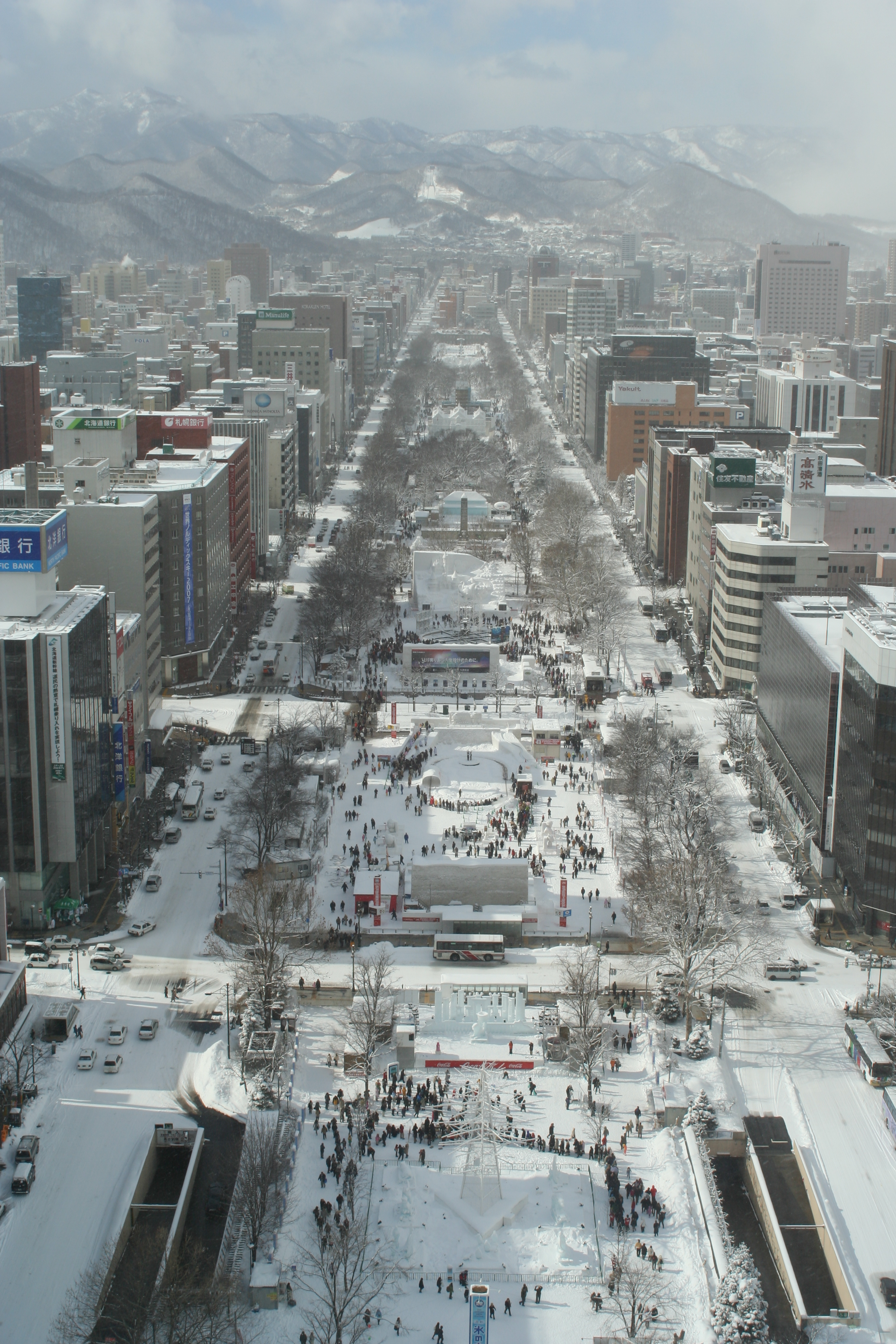
The snowy city of Sapporo, Japan, has a humid continental climate (Köppen Dfa).

Using the Köppen climate classification, a climate is classified as humid continental when the temperature of the coldest month is below 0 °C [32.0 °F] or −3 °C [26.6 °F] and there must be at least four months whose mean temperatures are at or above 10 °C (50 °F). These temperatures were not arbitrary. In Europe, the −3 °C (27 °F) average temperature isotherm (line of equal temperature) was near the southern extent of winter snowpack. In the United States, it is more common to use the 0 °C [32.0 °F] isotherm instead. The 10 °C (50 °F) average temperature was found to be roughly the minimum temperature necessary for tree reproduction and growth. Wide temperature ranges are common within this climate zone.

Second letter in the classification symbol defines seasonal rainfall as follows:

- s: A dry summer—the driest month in the high-sun half of the year (April to September in the Northern Hemisphere, October to March in the Southern Hemisphere) has less than 30 millimetres (1.18 in)/40 millimetres (1.57 in) of rainfall and has exactly or less than 1/3 the precipitation of the wettest month in the low-sun half of the year (October to March in the Northern Hemisphere, April to September in the Southern Hemisphere).
- w: A dry winter—the driest month in the low-sun half of the year has exactly or less than one‑tenth of the precipitation found in the wettest month in the summer half of the year.
- f: No dry season—does not meet either of the alternative specifications above; precipitation and humidity are often high year-round.

while the third letter denotes the extent of summer heat:

- a: Hot summer, warmest month averages at least 22 °C (71.6 °F),
- b: Warm summer, warmest month averages below 22 °C (71.6 °F) but at least four months averages above 10 °C (50.0 °F).

=== Associated precipitation ===
Within North America, moisture within this climate regime is supplied by the Great Lakes, Gulf of Mexico and adjacent western subtropical Atlantic. Precipitation is relatively well distributed year-round in many areas with this climate (f), while others may see a marked reduction in wintry precipitation, which increases the chances of a wintertime drought (w). Snowfall occurs in all areas with a humid continental climate and in many such places is more common than rain during the height of winter. In places with sufficient wintertime precipitation, the snow cover is often deep. Most summer rainfall occurs during thunderstorms, and in North America and Asia an occasional tropical cyclone (or the remnants thereof). Though humidity levels are often high in locations with humid continental climates, the "humid" designation means that the climate is not dry enough to be classified as semi-arid or arid.

=== Vegetation ===
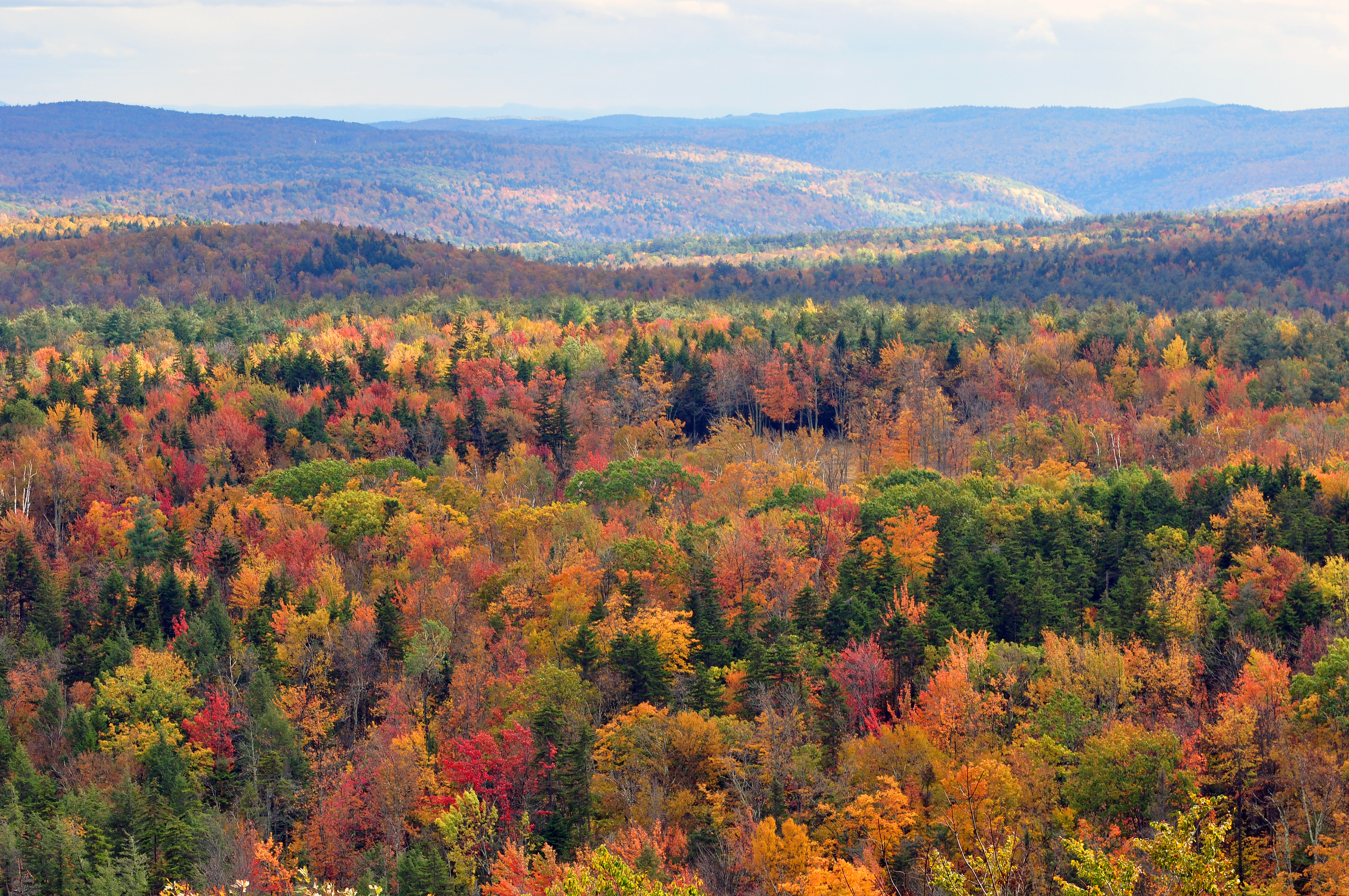
Mixed forest in Vermont during autumn

By definition, forests thrive within this climate. Biomes within this climate regime include temperate woodlands, temperate grasslands, temperate deciduous or evergreen forests, coniferous forests, and coniferous swamps. Within wetter areas, maple, spruce, pine, fir, and oak can be found. Fall foliage is noted during the autumn of deciduous forests.

=== Neighboring climates ===
In the poleward direction, these climates transition into subarctic climates featuring short summers (and usually very cold winters) allowing only conifer trees. Moving equatorword, the hot-summer continental climates grade into humid subtropical climates (chiefly in North America and Asia) while the warm-summer continental climates grade into oceanic climates (chiefly in Europe), both of which have milder winters where average temperatures stay above 0 °C (or -3 °C). Some continental climates with lower precipitation (chiefly in Central Asia and the Western United States) grade into semi-arid climates with similar temperatures but low precipitation.

== Hot summer subtype ==
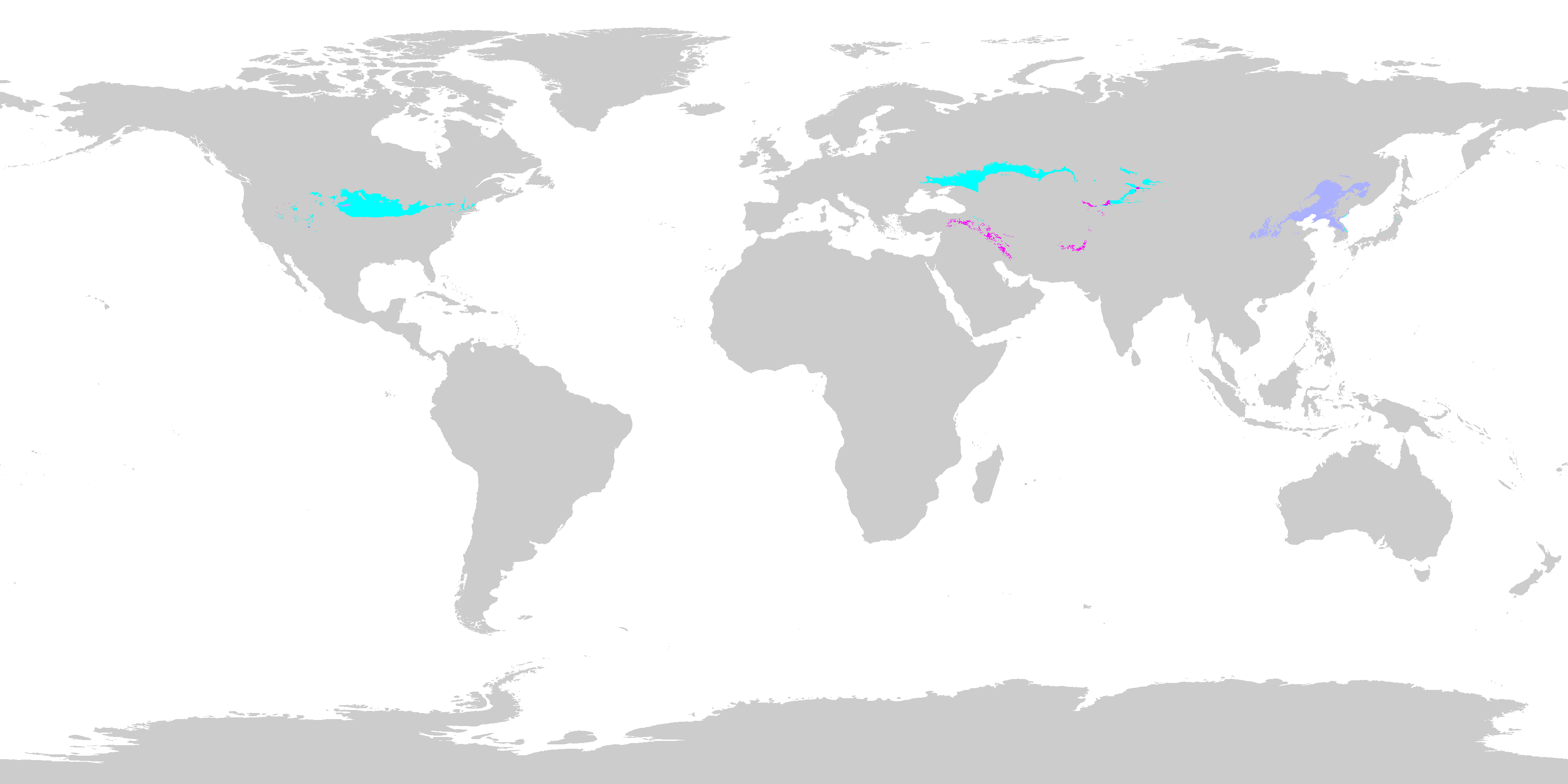
Regions with hot-summer humid continental climates as of 1991-2020, using the −3 °C (27 °F) threshold for the coldest month. Dfa Dwa Dsa

A hot summer version of a continental climate features an average temperature of at least 22 °C (71.6 °F) in its warmest month. Since these regimes are restricted to the Northern Hemisphere, the warmest month is usually July or August. High temperatures during the warmest month tend to be in the high 20s to low 30s °C (80s °F), while average January afternoon temperatures are near or well below freezing. Frost-free periods typically last 4 to 7 months in this climate regime.

Within North America, this climate includes portions of the central and eastern United States from east of 100°W to south of about the 44°N to the Atlantic. Precipitation increases further eastward in this zone and is less seasonally uniform in the west. The western states of the western United States (namely Montana, Wyoming, parts of southern Idaho, most of Lincoln County in Eastern Washington, parts of Colorado, parts of Utah, isolated parts of northern New Mexico, western Nebraska, and parts of western North and South Dakota) have thermal regimes which fit the Dfa climate type, but are quite dry, and are generally grouped with the steppe (BSk) climates.

In the eastern and Midwestern United States, Iowa, southern Minnesota, Pennsylvania, Ohio, Illinois, Indiana, southern Wisconsin, southern Michigan, southern New York, northern Connecticut and northern Rhode Island, and most of Massachusetts fall into the hot-summer humid continental climate. In Canada, this climate type exists only over portions of Southern Ontario and the island of Montreal.

In the Eastern Hemisphere, this climate regime is found within interior Eurasia and east-central Asia. Within Europe, the Dfa climate type is present near the Black Sea in southern Ukraine, the Southern Federal District of Russia, southern Moldova, Serbia, parts of southern Romania, and Bulgaria, but tends to be drier and can be even semi-arid in these places. In East Asia, this climate exhibits a monsoonal tendency with much higher precipitation in summer than in winter, and due to the effects of the strong Siberian High much colder winter temperatures than similar latitudes around the world, however with lower snowfall, the exception being western Japan with its heavy snowfall.

Tōhoku on the western coast of Japan also has a climate with Köppen classification Dfa, but is wetter even than that part of North America with this climate type. A variant which has dry winters and hence relatively lower snowfall with monsoonal type summer rainfall is to be found in northern China including Manchuria and parts of North China, far East of Russia, and over much of the Korean Peninsula; it has the Köppen classification Dwa. Much of central Asia, northwestern China, and southern Mongolia has a thermal regime similar to that of the Dfa climate type, but these regions receive so little precipitation that they are more often classified as steppes (BSk) or deserts (BWk).

Dsa climates are rare; they are generally restricted to elevated areas adjacent to mid-latitude Mediterranean climate regions with a Csa climate well inland to ensure hot summers and cold winters. They are generally found in the highly elevated areas of south-eastern Turkey (Hakkâri), north-western Iran, northern Iraq, parts of Central Asia, parts of the High Atlas mountain range in central Morocco and parts of the Intermountain West in the United States.

This climate zone does not exist at all in the Southern Hemisphere, where the continents either do not penetrate low enough in latitude or taper too much to have any place that gets the combination of snowy winters and hot summers. Marine influences are very strong around 40°S and such preclude Dfa, Dwa, and Dsa climates from existing in the southern hemisphere.

Chicago, Illinois, United States

Climate chart (precipitation, max. and min. temperature)
J	F	M	A	M	J	J	A	S	O	N	D
58 0 −7	54 3 −5	68 9 0	105 16 5	121 22 11	115 27 17	102 30 20	104 28 19	85 25 15	98 18 8	69 10 2	59 3 −4
- █ Average max. and min. temperatures in °C
- █ Precipitation totals in mm
- Source: NOAA
Imperial conversion
J	F	M	A	M	J	J	A	S	O	N	D
2.3 33 20	2.1 37 23	2.7 48 32	4.1 60 42	4.8 71 52	4.5 81 63	4 85 68	4.1 83 67	3.3 76 59	3.9 64 47	2.7 50 35	2.3 38 25
- █ Average max. and min. temperatures in °F
- █ Precipitation totals in inches

Shenyang, Liaoning, China

Climate chart (precipitation, max. and min. temperature)
J	F	M	A	M	J	J	A	S	O	N	D
6.9 −5 −17	8.6 0 −12	21 7 −4	40 17 5	53 23 12	93 28 17	174 29 21	169 29 19	65 24 12	39 16 4	20 6 −5	10 −2 −13
- █ Average max. and min. temperatures in °C
- █ Precipitation totals in mm
- Source: China Meteorological Administration
Imperial conversion
J	F	M	A	M	J	J	A	S	O	N	D
0.3 23 2	0.3 31 11	0.8 45 25	1.6 62 40	2.1 74 53	3.6 82 63	6.8 84 69	6.7 83 67	2.5 75 54	1.6 61 40	0.8 42 24	0.4 28 9
- █ Average max. and min. temperatures in °F
- █ Precipitation totals in inches

Rostov-on-Don, Russia

Climate chart (precipitation, max. and min. temperature)
J	F	M	A	M	J	J	A	S	O	N	D
58 0 −5	48 1 −5	50 8 0	38 17 6	58 23 11	59 28 16	50 30 18	43 30 18	43 24 12	48 15 7	51 7 0	58 1 −4
- █ Average max. and min. temperatures in °C
- █ Precipitation totals in mm
- Source: = Pogoda.ru.net
Imperial conversion
J	F	M	A	M	J	J	A	S	O	N	D
2.3 32 23	1.9 34 23	2 46 31	1.5 62 43	2.3 73 52	2.3 82 60	2 86 64	1.7 85 64	1.7 74 54	1.9 59 44	2 44 33	2.3 35 26
- █ Average max. and min. temperatures in °F
- █ Precipitation totals in inches

Muş, Turkey

Climate chart (precipitation, max. and min. temperature)
J	F	M	A	M	J	J	A	S	O	N	D
94 −3 −10	106 −1 −9	112 7 −2	102 15 5	74 22 9	29 28 13	10 34 18	4.8 34 18	17 29 13	60 21 8	82 10 1	92 1 −5
- █ Average max. and min. temperatures in °C
- █ Precipitation totals in mm
- Source: Turkish State Meteorological Service
Imperial conversion
J	F	M	A	M	J	J	A	S	O	N	D
3.7 27 14	4.2 31 17	4.4 44 29	4 60 41	2.9 71 49	1.1 83 56	0.4 92 64	0.2 93 64	0.7 83 55	2.4 69 46	3.2 50 33	3.6 34 22
- █ Average max. and min. temperatures in °F
- █ Precipitation totals in inches

Sapporo, Japan

Climate chart (precipitation, max. and min. temperature)
J	F	M	A	M	J	J	A	S	O	N	D
108 0 −6	92 0 −6	78 5 −2	55 12 3	56 18 9	60 22 13	91 25 18	127 26 19	142 23 15	110 16 8	114 9 2	115 2 −4
- █ Average max. and min. temperatures in °C
- █ Precipitation totals in mm
- Source: Japan Meteorological Agency
Imperial conversion
J	F	M	A	M	J	J	A	S	O	N	D
4.3 31 20	3.6 33 21	3.1 40 28	2.1 53 38	2.2 64 48	2.4 71 56	3.6 78 64	5 80 66	5.6 73 59	4.3 62 46	4.5 48 35	4.5 36 25
- █ Average max. and min. temperatures in °F
- █ Precipitation totals in inches

== Warm summer subtype ==
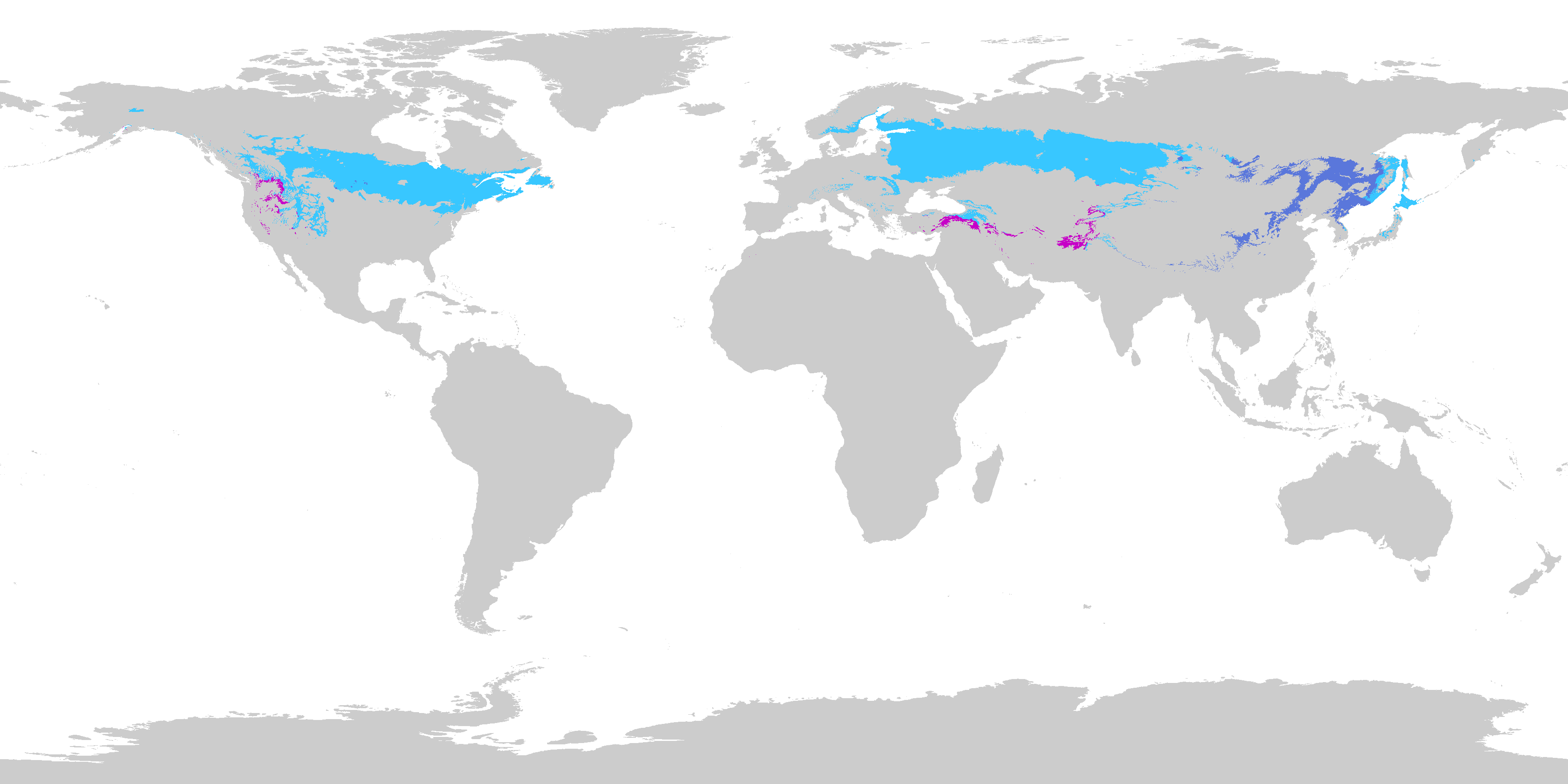
Regions with warm-summer humid continental climates as of 1991-2020, using the −3 °C (27 °F) threshold for the coldest month. Dfb Dwb Dsb

Also known as hemiboreal climate, areas featuring this subtype of the continental climate have an average temperature in the warmest month below 22 °C (72 °F). Summer high temperatures in this zone typically average between 21–28 °C (70–82 °F) during the daytime and the average temperatures in the coldest month are generally well or far below the −3 °C (27 °F) (or 0 °C (32.0 °F)) isotherm. Frost-free periods typically last 3–5 months. Heat spells lasting over a week are rare.

The warm summer version of the humid continental climate covers a much larger area than the hot subtype. In North America, the climate zone covers from about 42°N to 50°N latitude mostly east of 100°W, including parts of Southern Ontario, the southern half of Quebec, The Maritimes, and Newfoundland, as well as the northern United States from eastern North Dakota east to Maine. However, it can be found as far north as 54°N, and further west in the Canadian Prairie Provinces and below 40°N in the high Appalachians. In Europe, this subtype reaches its most northerly latitude in Bodø at the 67°N.

High-altitude locations such as Flagstaff, Arizona, Aspen, Colorado and Los Alamos, New Mexico in the western United States exhibit local Dfb climates. The south-central and southwestern Prairie Provinces also fits the Dfb criteria from a thermal profile, but because of semi-arid precipitation portions of it are grouped into the BSk category.

In Europe, it is found in much of Central Europe: Germany (in the east and southeast part of the country), Austria (generally below 700 m (2,297 ft)), Poland, Czech Republic, Slovakia, Hungary (generally above 100 m (328 ft)), Croatia (mostly Slavonia region), in much of Eastern Europe: Ukraine (the whole country except the Black Sea coast), Belarus, Russia (mostly central part of European Russia), most of Moldova, south and central parts of the Nordic countries not bathed by the Atlantic Ocean or North Sea: Sweden (historical regions of Svealand and Götaland), Finland (south end, including the three largest cities), Norway (most populated area), all Baltic States: Estonia, Latvia, Lithuania and also in parts of: Armenia, Georgia, Romania (generally above 100 m (328 ft)), Bosnia and Herzegovina, Turkey and in the Cairngorm Mountains of Scotland, (generally above 100 m (328 ft)). It has little warming or precipitation effects from the northern Atlantic. The cool summer subtype is marked by mild summers, long cold winters and less precipitation than the hot summer subtype; however, short periods of extreme heat are not uncommon. Northern Japan has a similar climate.

In Asia, this climate type is found in northern Kazakhstan, southern Siberia, parts of Mongolia, northern China, and highland elevations in the Koreas. Like its hot-summer counterpart, these climates are typically dry in the winter and bitterly cold due to the Siberian High (often with winter temperatures comparable to their nearby subarctic climates), while summers are warm and long enough to avoid classification as a subarctic climate.

In the Southern Hemisphere, it exists in well-defined areas only in the Southern Alps of New Zealand, in the Snowy Mountains of Australia in Kiandra, New South Wales and the Andes Mountains of Argentina and Chile.

Erzurum, Turkey

Climate chart (precipitation, max. and min. temperature)
J	F	M	A	M	J	J	A	S	O	N	D
16 −4 −16	19 −2 −15	35 4 −8	56 12 −1	72 18 3	42 23 6	22 28 10	17 29 10	23 24 4	47 16 0	26 7 −6	21 −1 −12
- █ Average max. and min. temperatures in °C
- █ Precipitation totals in mm
- Source: mgm.gov.tr
Imperial conversion
J	F	M	A	M	J	J	A	S	O	N	D
0.6 25 3	0.7 28 6	1.4 39 19	2.2 54 31	2.8 64 38	1.7 73 43	0.9 82 50	0.7 83 50	0.9 75 40	1.9 62 33	1 45 21	0.8 30 10
- █ Average max. and min. temperatures in °F
- █ Precipitation totals in inches

Halifax, Nova Scotia, Canada

Climate chart (precipitation, max. and min. temperature)
J	F	M	A	M	J	J	A	S	O	N	D
139 0 −8	110 0 −8	133 4 −4	118 9 1	119 14 6	112 20 11	110 23 14	96 23 15	109 19 12	124 13 6	151 8 2	145 3 −4
- █ Average max. and min. temperatures in °C
- █ Precipitation totals in mm
- Source: Environment Canada
Imperial conversion
J	F	M	A	M	J	J	A	S	O	N	D
5.5 32 17	4.3 33 19	5.2 38 25	4.6 48 34	4.7 58 42	4.4 67 51	4.3 74 58	3.8 74 59	4.3 67 53	4.9 56 44	5.9 47 35	5.7 37 24
- █ Average max. and min. temperatures in °F
- █ Precipitation totals in inches

Minsk, Belarus

Climate chart (precipitation, max. and min. temperature)
J	F	M	A	M	J	J	A	S	O	N	D
47 −2 −6	40 −1 −6	41 5 −3	43 13 3	66 19 8	79 22 12	97 24 14	71 24 13	51 18 9	55 10 4	49 4 −1	47 −1 −5
- █ Average max. and min. temperatures in °C
- █ Precipitation totals in mm
- Source: Pogoda.ru.net
Imperial conversion
J	F	M	A	M	J	J	A	S	O	N	D
1.9 28 21	1.6 31 21	1.6 40 27	1.7 55 37	2.6 66 47	3.1 72 54	3.8 76 58	2.8 74 56	2 64 48	2.2 51 39	1.9 38 31	1.9 31 24
- █ Average max. and min. temperatures in °F
- █ Precipitation totals in inches

Khabarovsk, Russia

Climate chart (precipitation, max. and min. temperature)
J	F	M	A	M	J	J	A	S	O	N	D
13 −15 −23	12 −10 −20	22 −1 −11	37 11 0	70 19 7	84 24 13	137 27 17	143 25 16	85 20 9	48 11 1	26 −3 −10	19 −14 −21
- █ Average max. and min. temperatures in °C
- █ Precipitation totals in mm
- Source: Pogoda.ru.net
Imperial conversion
J	F	M	A	M	J	J	A	S	O	N	D
0.5 5 −10	0.5 14 −3	0.9 30 13	1.5 51 32	2.8 67 45	3.3 75 55	5.4 80 62	5.6 77 60	3.3 67 49	1.9 51 34	1 27 13	0.7 8 −6
- █ Average max. and min. temperatures in °F
- █ Precipitation totals in inches

Idaho Falls, Idaho, United States

Climate chart (precipitation, max. and min. temperature)
J	F	M	A	M	J	J	A	S	O	N	D
17 −2 −11	14 1 −9	21 8 −4	26 14 0	40 20 4	28 25 7	12 30 10	15 30 9	25 24 5	22 15 −1	17 6 −6	20 −1 −10
- █ Average max. and min. temperatures in °C
- █ Precipitation totals in mm
- Source: National Weather Service
Imperial conversion
J	F	M	A	M	J	J	A	S	O	N	D
0.7 29 12	0.6 34 16	0.8 47 25	1 58 31	1.6 67 38	1.1 76 45	0.5 87 49	0.6 86 47	1 75 41	0.9 59 31	0.7 43 22	0.8 30 13
- █ Average max. and min. temperatures in °F
- █ Precipitation totals in inches

Jermuk, Armenia

Climate chart (precipitation, max. and min. temperature)
J	F	M	A	M	J	J	A	S	O	N	D
67 −3 −12	67 −2 −12	84 2 −7	105 7 −1	100 13 3	64 18 6	42 22 9	23 23 9	33 19 5	60 13 2	60 6 −4	62 0 −9
- █ Average max. and min. temperatures in °C
- █ Precipitation totals in mm
- Source: NOAA
Imperial conversion
J	F	M	A	M	J	J	A	S	O	N	D
2.6 28 10	2.6 29 11	3.3 36 19	4.1 45 29	3.9 56 37	2.5 64 42	1.7 71 48	0.9 73 48	1.3 67 41	2.3 56 35	2.3 42 25	2.4 33 17
- █ Average max. and min. temperatures in °F
- █ Precipitation totals in inches

== Use in climate modeling ==
Since climate regimes tend to be dominated by vegetation of one region with relatively homogenous ecology, those that project climate change remap their results in the form of climate regimes as an alternative way to explain expected changes.

== See also ==
- Continental climate
- Subarctic climate
- Hemiboreal
