= Danish Strait =

Body of water in the Canadian Arctic Archipelago

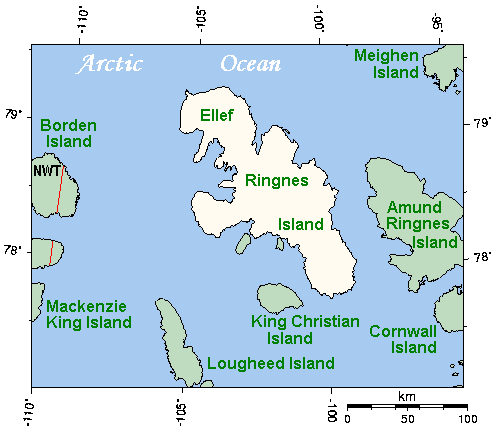
- The Sverdrup Islands, with Danish Strait running between Ellef Ringnes Island and King Christian Island

- Location within Nunavut
- Location: Canadian Arctic Archipelago
- Coordinates: 78°2′N 101°45′W
- Ocean/sea sources: Arctic Ocean
- Basin countries: Canada

Danish Strait is a strait running through the Sverdrup Islands in the Canadian Arctic Archipelago. Located in the waters of the Canadian territory of Nunavut, this natural waterway separates Thor Island to the north-west and Ellef Ringnes Island to the north and east from King Christian Island to the south.
