= Berkeley Islands =

Island group in Nunavut, Canada

- Location within Nunavut Location within Canada

Geography
- Location: Northern Canada
- Coordinates: 76°43′05″N 100°40′08″W
- Archipelago: Queen Elizabeth Islands; Arctic Archipelago
- Major islands: Allard Island, Harwood Island, Ricards Island, Seymour Island, and Sherard Osborn Island

Administration
- Canada
- Territory: Nunavut

Demographics
- Population: Uninhabited

The Berkeley Islands (formerly Berkeley Group are an uninhabited island group in the Qikiqtaaluk Region of northern Canada's territory of Nunavut. They are located at the head of Young Inlet off northern Bathurst Island. The Berkeley Group is part of the Arctic Archipelago and is a member of the Parry Islands subgroup. It is composed of the Hosken Islands, Allard Island, Harwood Island, Ricards Island, Seymour Island, and Sherard Osborn Island (the largest). It is named in honor of Maurice Berkeley, 1st Baron FitzHardinge, Royal Navy First Sea Lord.
