= Adam Range =

Mountain range in Nunavut, Canada

- Location within Nunavut

Highest point
- Elevation: 153 m (502 ft)

Geography
- Country: Canada
- Region: Nunavut
- Range coordinates: 76°09′05″N 103°30′11″W
- Parent range: Arctic Cordillera

The Adam Range is a mountain range on Île Vanier, Nunavut, Canada. It is one of the many mountain ranges in the Canadian Arctic that make up the Arctic Cordillera mountain system.

== See also ==
- List of mountain ranges
