= May Inlet =

Inlet in Nunavut, Canada

- Location within Nunavut
- Location: Sir William Parker Strait
- Coordinates: 76°15′N 100°45′W
- Ocean/sea sources: Arctic Ocean
- Basin countries: Canada
- Settlements: Uninhabited

May Inlet is an Arctic waterway in the Qikiqtaaluk Region, Nunavut, Canada. It is a natural bay in Sir William Parker Strait by northern Bathurst Island.

== Geography ==
Notable landforms include: Grant Point to the west; Dundee Bight to the south; Palmer Point, Stuart Bay, and Purcell Bay to the east; and several unnamed islands within the bay. Helena Island is to the north, outside the bay's mouth.
