= Stokes Mountain =

Mountain in Nunavut, Canada

Highest point
- Elevation: 412 m (1,352 ft)
- Prominence: 412 m (1,352 ft)
- Coordinates: 76°23′06″N 101°39′06″W

Geography
- Location: Bathurst Island, Nunavut, Canada
- Parent range: Stokes Range
- Topo map: NTS 69B7 Oliver Harbour

Geology
- Mountain type: Mesa

Stokes Mountain is the highest mountain of the Stokes Range and of Bathurst Island, Nunavut, Canada. It also has a topographic prominence of 412 m (1,352 ft), greater than any other mountain in the Stokes Range.
