= Polar Bear Pass =

Mountain pass in Nunavut, Canada

- Nanuit Itillinga/Kitturajaaq (Inuktitut)
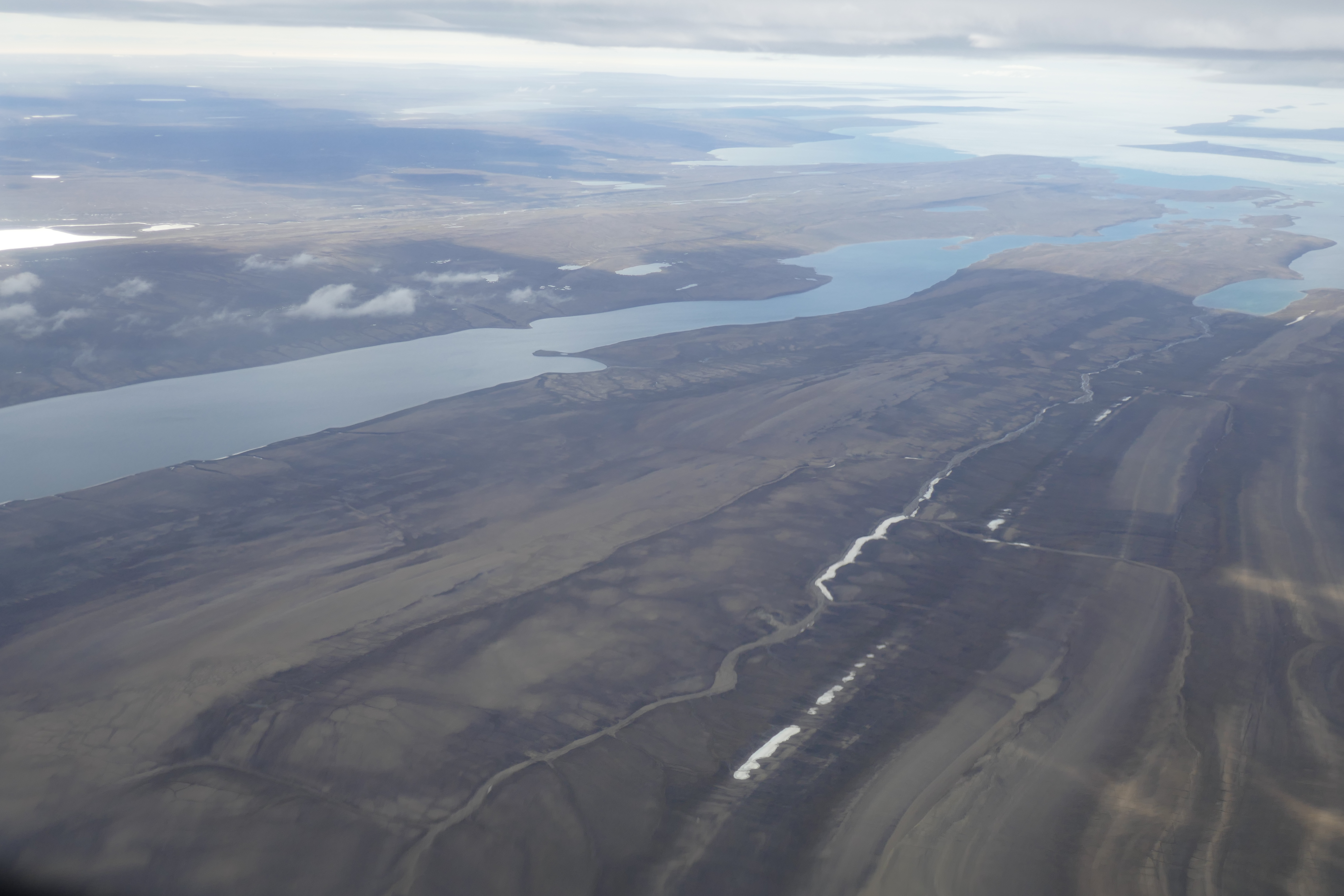

- Location within Nunavut

Location
- Location: Bathurst Island, Qikiqtaaluk, Nunavut, Canada
- Coordinates: 75°43′N 98°40′W
- Topo map: NTS 68H11 Caledonian River

Ramsar Wetland
- Designated: 24 May 1982
- Reference no.: 245

Polar Bear Pass (Inuktitut: Nanuit Itillinga/Kitturajaaq), is a 262,400-hectare (648,000-acre) wetland and mountain pass on Bathurst Island within the Qikiqtaaluk Region, Nunavut, Canada. The pass is on federal Crown land.

== Fauna and flora ==
The wetland exists within a tundra desert in the high Arctic. It is a staging area for migratory birds, as well as a breeding area for numerous bird species. The large insect population is an ample food source for these birds.

Various water features are located throughout the site, including lakes, tundra ponds and meadows. Vegetation consists primarily of "grasses, sedges, mosses and lichens", as well as a diversity of flowering plants.

An ecological research station is located on the site. Various studies have been conducted in the area, including those on the endangered Peary caribou by the Canadian Wildlife Service. Currently, the territorial government is funding studies on muskoxen and caribou in the region.

Other than the two endangered species that inhabit the pass, polar bears and the aforementioned Peary caribou, it also contains at least 54 bird species and 11 mammals. Rock structures on the North side of the pass provide nesting and dens for wildlife.

Its name is derived from the polar bears that migrate through the region between March and November each year.

== Conservation ==
Polar Bear Pass is an International Biological Program site. It was designated a Ramsar site on May 24, 1982. Polar Bear Pass National Wildlife Area received its designation in 1985.
