= Robert Dawes Aldrich =

British Royal Navy officer (born 1808)

Admiral Robert Dawes Aldrich, born 19 October 1808, joined the Royal Navy in 1824 (22 January), age 15, was promoted to mate in 1830 and lieutenant in 1842 (7 March). He served as lieutenant in HMS Resolute under the command of Horatio Thomas Austin on the 1850-1851 Admiralty search for Sir John Franklin's missing Northwest Passage expedition. His correspondence with Sophia Cracroft regarding the search for Franklin's lost expedition, 1857-1859 commanded by Leopold McClintock is held by the Scott Polar Research Institute in Cambridge, England.

In October 1850, Aldrich participated in a sledging programme to lay depots on Somerville Island, to the southwest of Cornwallis Island, in preparation for a search by sledge the following year. In the spring of the following year (starting 15 April 1851) he was away for 62 days, travelling by sledge to Bathurst Island. He went over 550 mi (890 km), at an average rate of 9 1/2 mi (15.3 km) a day, examining part of the island's west coast before proceeding north to explore the western coasts of the small islands as far as Cape Aldrich.

Cape Aldrich on the western shore of Île Vanier should be distinguished from Cape Aldrich on Ellesmere Island, both in Nunavut, Canada.

He retired with the rank of captain in 1860, and was reserved on half pay; he was subsequently promoted to rear admiral (31 December 1876), vice admiral (23 November 1881) and admiral (24 May 1887); he died in 1891 (2 June).

He was the son of Robert Aldrich and Anne Davey. He married Elizabeth Strutt Jeakes (daughter of William Jeakes) on 31 March 1852, and had two daughters, Alice M and Fanny K Aldrich. He was an uncle of Admiral Pelham Aldrich CVO (British Arctic Expedition 1875–1876) and the pioneering woman surgeon Dame Louisa Aldrich-Blake.
