= 82nd meridian east =

Line of longitude

82nd meridian east

The meridian 82° east of Greenwich is a line of longitude that extends from the North Pole across the Arctic Ocean, Asia, the Indian Ocean, the Southern Ocean, and Antarctica to the South Pole.

The 82nd meridian east forms a great circle with the 98th meridian west.

== From Pole to Pole ==
Starting at the North Pole and heading south to the South Pole, the 82nd meridian east passes through:

Co-ordinates	Country, territory or sea	Notes
90°0′N 82°0′E	Arctic Ocean	
81°7′N 82°0′E	Kara Sea	Passing just west of Uyedineniya Island (at 77°32′N 82°13′E)
75°53′N 82°0′E	Russia	Krasnoyarsk Krai — Pologyy-Sergeyeva Island
75°52′N 82°0′E	Kara Sea	
75°30′N 82°0′E	Russia	Krasnoyarsk Krai — Arkticheskiy Institut Islands
75°7′N 82°0′E	Kara Sea	
73°37′N 82°0′E	Russia	Krasnoyarsk Krai
72°17′N 82°0′E	Yenisei Gulf	
71°41′N 82°0′E	Russia	Krasnoyarsk Krai; Yamalo-Nenets Autonomous Okrug — from 69°12′N 82°0′E; Krasnoyarsk Krai — from 67°57′N 82°0′E; Yamalo-Nenets Autonomous Okrug — from 67°45′N 82°0′E; Khanty-Mansi Autonomous Okrug — from 62°45′N 82°0′E; Tomsk Oblast — from 60°35′N 82°0′E; Novosibirsk Oblast — from 56°20′N 82°0′E; Altai Krai — from 53°42′N 82°0′E
50°48′N 82°0′E	Kazakhstan	
45°9′N 82°0′E	People's Republic of China	Xinjiang; Tibet — from 35°19′N 82°0′E
30°20′N 82°0′E	Nepal	
27°56′N 82°0′E	India	Uttar Pradesh; Madhya Pradesh — from 24°50′N 82°0′E; Chhattisgarh — from 23°51′N 82°0′E; Madhya Pradesh — from 23°25′N 82°0′E; Chhattisgarh — from 23°4′N 82°0′E; Odisha — from 20°3′N 82°0′E; Chhattisgarh — from 19°48′N 82°0′E; Odisha — from 18°48′N 82°0′E; Andhra Pradesh — from 18°2′N 82°0′E
16°25′N 82°0′E	Indian Ocean	Passing just to the east of Sri Lanka (at 7°1′N 81°53′E)
60°0′S 82°0′E	Southern Ocean	
65°47′S 82°0′E	Antarctica	Australian Antarctic Territory, claimed by Australia
66°29′S 82°0′E	Southern Ocean	Barrier Bay
67°24′S 82°0′E	Antarctica	Australian Antarctic Territory, claimed by Australia

== See also ==
- 81st meridian east
- 83rd meridian east
