= Larsen Sound =

Arctic waterway in Nunavut

- Interactive map of Larsen Sound
- Coordinates: 70°30′N 98°45′W
- Basin countries: Canada
- Settlements: Uninhabited

Larsen Sound is an Arctic waterway in the Kitikmeot Region, Nunavut, Canada.

It is located south of Prince of Wales Island, west of the Boothia Peninsula, north of King William Island and east of Gateshead Island. To the west and north-west the sound opens into the M'Clintock Channel, to the north-east it opens into Peel Sound, to the south-east into James Ross Strait, and to the south-west into Victoria Strait.
