= Massey Island =

Island in Nunavut, Canada

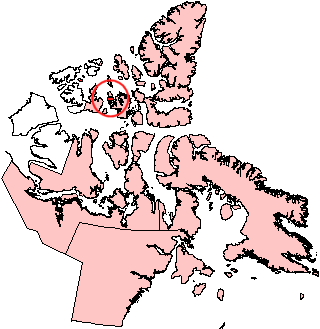
- Location of Île Vanier near Massey Island

- Location within Nunavut Location within Canada

Geography
- Location: Arctic Ocean
- Coordinates: 75°59′N 102°58′W
- Archipelago: Arctic Archipelago
- Area: 432 km^{2} (167 sq mi)
- Length: 47 km (29.2 mi)
- Width: 34 km (21.1 mi)

Administration
- Canada
- Territory: Nunavut
- Region: Qikiqtaaluk

Demographics
- Population: Uninhabited

Massey Island is an uninhabited island in the Bathurst Island group, Qikiqtaaluk Region, Nunavut, Canada. It is located in the Arctic Ocean, south of Île Vanier (across Pearse Strait) and north of Alexander Island and Île Marc (across Boyer Strait). It has an area of 432 km^{2} (167 sq mi), 47 kilometres (29 mi) long and 34 kilometres (21 mi) wide.

The island is named for former Governor General of Canada Vincent Massey.
