= Alexander Island (Nunavut) =

Uninhabited island in northern Canada

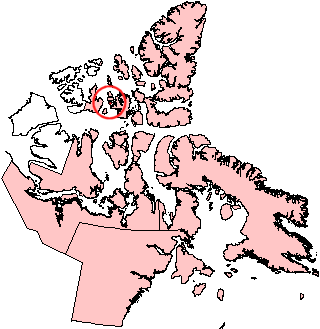
- Alexander Island, Nunavut

- Location in Nunavut Location in Canada

Geography
- Location: Northern Canada
- Coordinates: 75°52′N 102°37′W
- Archipelago: Queen Elizabeth Islands; Arctic Archipelago
- Area: 484 km^{2} (187 sq mi)
- Length: 43 km (26.7 mi)
- Width: 19 km (11.8 mi)

Administration
- Canada
- Territory: Nunavut

Demographics
- Population: Uninhabited

Alexander Island is one of the Queen Elizabeth Islands of the Canadian arctic islands located in Nunavut, Canada. It lies south of Massey Island and Île Marc (across Boyer Strait), and north of Bathurst Island (across Pell Inlet). Located at 75°52'N 102°37'W it has an area of 484 km^{2} (187 sq mi), 42.8 kilometres (26.6 mi) long and 19 kilometres (12 mi) wide. Alexander Island is uninhabited.
