= Seymour Island (Nunavut) =

Uninhabited island in the Canadian Arctic

- Location within Nunavut Location within Canada

Geography
- Location: Northern Canada
- Coordinates: 76°48′04″N 101°16′08″W
- Archipelago: Queen Elizabeth Islands; Arctic Archipelago
- Area: 2 km^{2} (0.77 sq mi)
- Highest elevation: 28 m (92 ft)

Administration
- Canada
- Territory: Nunavut
- Region: Qikiqtaaluk

Demographics
- Population: Uninhabited

Seymour Island is an uninhabited island in the Qikiqtaaluk Region of northern Canada's territory of Nunavut. A member of the Berkeley Islands group, it is located approximately 48 km (30 mi) north of northern Bathurst Island. Between Seymour Island and Bathurst Island lies Helena Island. Penny Strait lies about 90 km (56 mi) to the east where open water polynyas occur.

It was first noted by Europeans during the search for Franklin's lost expedition around 1858 when passed in open water by an explorer's ship, who did not land. It then was described as "....a long, low reef, about 100 feet in elevation." It was named after one of the ship's crew members. The first recorded visit likely was during the Canadian Army's survey and mapping of the Arctic islands in the late 1940s. A metal "T-shaped" triangulation point survey marker then was installed on the island's highest point, now called Triangle Point. Sometime in the early 1970s, five unmarked, sealed 45 gallon drums of aviation fuel were cached near the point, possibly by an oil exploration company. They were never reclaimed. In the summer of 1973, Stewart D. Macdonald of the Canadian National Museum of Natural Sciences discovered the island was the first known permanent nesting colony of endangered ivory gulls in the New World.

Less than 3 by 1 km (1.86 by 0.62 mi), it rises approximately 28 m (92 ft) above sea level, and is approximately 2 km^{2} (0.77 sq mi) in size. The island is characterized by raised beaches of shattered sandstone boulders and glacial erratics, coastal sand bars, gravel ridges, freshwater ponds and permafrost springs. A small piece of fossil coral occurs on the main ridge near the Triangle Point. Though polynyas form in the area, the island is commonly ice locked year round. Snow melt occurs during June, with some snowcover on the northeast part of the island lasting into July. Freshwater ponds can begin to freeze over in late August. Summer weather often is foggy with temperatures just above freezing. Winter minimum temperature was recorded in the mid-1970s as −58 °C (−72 °F), and summer maximum as 10 °C (50 °F).

== Flora and fauna ==
The Canadian National Museum of Natural Sciences, Vertebrate Ethology Division, established a natural history research station on Seymour Island in the summers from 1974 to 1977. Headed by Stewart D. Macdonald, Curator of Vertebrate Ethology at the Museum, the station was staffed by two to three biologists. Their main objective was to study the endangered ivory gull. Considerable other wildlife and weather data also was collected.

Vegetation is sparse, consisting primarily of mosses and lichens. Only seven species of vascular plants have been recorded, with the most common being purple saxifrage.

The island is frequented by polar bears, and less commonly, the Arctic wolf and Arctic fox. There is a small resident population of collared lemmings, and Peary caribou have been recorded. One Peary caribou, killed by Arctic wolves in the winter of 1973–74, was recorded in the spring of 1974. A herd of seven Peary caribou was observed from Seymour on the north coast of nearby Helena Island in the summer of 1977. Ringed seals are common on the surrounding pack ice, with up to 100 being recorded in view basking around Seymour Island. Bearded seals are occasional as well. A beluga whale skeleton occurs on the southwest coast, some distance up from the current sea level. The ocean surrounding the island contains Arctic cod, lion's mane jellyfish and Gammaracanthus sp. shrimp. A piece, of what is possibly, bowhead whale baleen was found as part of an ivory gull nest in 1976. Driftwood found on an old beach ridge near the top of the island was carbon dated to 3,200 years BP.

=== Birds ===
Nesting birds include red-throated loon, king and common eider, long-tailed duck (oldsquaw), brant goose, Arctic tern, purple sandpiper, and snow bunting. Visiting birds include Ross's gull, black-legged kittiwake, Murre sp., snowy owl, parasitic jaeger, long-tailed jaeger, pomarine jaeger, and common raven. Thayer's gull and glaucous gull are to be found here also, but the island is most notable for ivory gulls, found on Seymour Island from May to September. A total of 233 nesting pairs of ivory gulls were recorded in the mid-1970s. Variable numbers of non-breeders, up to about 200, also were recorded. In July 1976, three colour-marked and banded ivory gulls from Seymour were recorded 1,000 km (620 mi) southeast on Prince Leopold Island three weeks later. The gulls of Seymour Island breed on raised rocky beaches unlike other Canadian ivory gull colonies. The island supports Canada's largest known ivory gull breeding colony, approximately 10–12 per cent of the known Canadian population. In 2005, Gilchrist and Mallory postulated that Seymour Island gulls may represent forty per cent of the surviving Canadian population of this species. The Seymour Island population represents approximately one per cent of the world population of ivory gulls.

== Protected areas ==
The Naujavaat (Seymour Island) Migratory Bird Sanctuary, established in 1975, is 5,302 ha (13,100 acres) in size, including the island and surrounding waters. The migratory bird sanctuary is part of the Seymour Island Important Bird Area (No. NU045). The island is also an International Biological Programme Site (No. 1-7), and a Key Marine Habitat Site in Nunavut (No. 2).

== Sources ==
- MacDonald, S. D. 1976.Phantoms of the polar pack ice. Audubon Magazine 78(3):2–19.
- Morgan, J. P. 1979. Ivory Gull Summer. Manitoba Nature Magazine. Manitoba Museum of Man and Nature, Winnipeg, MB. Reference incomplete.
