= HMS Pantaloon =

Two ships of the Royal Navy have borne the name HMS Pantaloon:

- HMS Pantaloon (1831) was a unique 10-gun brig built at Troon as the Duke of Portland's yacht in 1831, and purchased later that year, keeping her civilian name; following dhow chasing to suppress the East African slave trade, broken up in 1852.
- HMS Pantaloon (1860) was an 11-gun Racer-class wooden screw sloop launched in 1860 at Devonport Dockyard and sold in 1867.
