= Thor Island (Nunavut) =

Island in Nunavut, Canada

Thor
- Location within Nunavut Location within Canada

Geography
- Location: Northern Canada
- Coordinates: 78°12′N 103°00′W
- Archipelago: Queen Elizabeth Islands; Arctic Archipelago
- Area: 123 km^{2} (47 sq mi)

Administration
- Canada
- Territory: Nunavut
- Region: Qikiqtaaluk

Demographics
- Population: 0

Thor Island is one of the Canadian arctic islands in Nunavut, Canada. It lies south of Ellef Ringnes Island.
