= Helena Island =

Uninhabited Canadian Arctic island

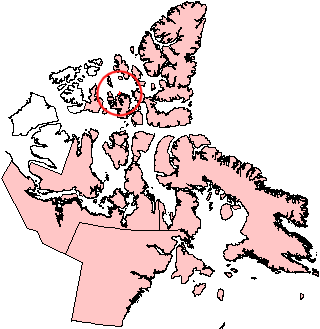
- Helena Island, Nunavut

- Location within Nunavut Location within Canada

Geography
- Location: Northern Canada
- Coordinates: 76°40′N 101°00′W
- Archipelago: Queen Elizabeth Islands; Arctic Archipelago
- Area: 327 km^{2} (126 sq mi)
- Length: 41 km (25.5 mi)
- Width: 13 km (8.1 mi)

Administration
- Canada
- Territory: Nunavut
- Region: Qikiqtaaluk

Demographics
- Population: Uninhabited

Helena Island is one of the uninhabited members of the Queen Elizabeth Islands of the Canadian Arctic islands in the Qikiqtaaluk Region of Nunavut, Canada. It is along the northern coast of Bathurst Island, separated by Sir William Parker Strait. Seymour Island is located off its west coast. Located at 76°39'N 101°04'W, Helena Island is 327 km^{2} (126 sq mi) in area and measures 41 by 12.8 km (25.5 by 8.0 mi).

Its major landmarks are Devereaux Point in the north, Noel Point in the west, and Cape Robert Smart in the south.
