= King Christian Island =

Uninhabited island in the Arctic Archipelago

- Location within Nunavut Location within Canada

Geography
- Location: Arctic Ocean
- Coordinates: 77°4′N 102°00′W
- Archipelago: Sverdrup Islands; Queen Elizabeth Islands; Arctic Archipelago
- Area: 645 km^{2} (249 sq mi)
- Length: 39 km (24.2 mi)
- Width: 26 km (16.2 mi)
- Highest elevation: 165 m (541 ft)
- Highest point: King Christian Mountain

Administration
- Canada
- Nunavut: Nunavut
- Region: Qikiqtaaluk

Demographics
- Population: Uninhabited
- Source: King Christian Island at Atlas of Canada

King Christian Island is an uninhabited member of the Arctic Archipelago in the Sverdrup Islands, a part of the Queen Elizabeth Islands archipelago, in the Qikiqtaaluk Region of Nunavut, Canada. It lies in the Arctic Ocean, 13.5 km (8.4 mi) from the southwestern coast of Ellef Ringnes Island, separated by the Danish Strait.

The island has an area of 645 km^{2} (249 sq mi), measures 38.8 km (24.1 mi) long and 25.7 km (16.0 mi) wide.

== History ==
The first European to visit the island was Gunnar Isachsen in 1901. Vilhjalmur Stefansson charted its southern coast in 1916.

In 1970, Panarctic Oils drilled an exploration well (number D18) on King Christian Island which blew out of control and caught fire. After drilling down to 610 m (2,010 ft), gas began to flow to the surface, caught fire and burned the rig. Panarctic estimated the gas flow at 5,700,000 m^{3} (200,000,000 ft^{3}) per day, the largest blowout in Canadian history.
