= Ommanney Bay =

Bay in Nunavut, Canada

- Location within Nunavut
- Location: Parry Channel
- Coordinates: 73°N 101°W
- Ocean/sea sources: Arctic Ocean
- Basin countries: Canada
- Settlements: Uninhabited

Ommanney Bay is an Arctic waterway in Qikiqtaaluk Region, Nunavut, Canada. It is located in Parry Channel and is a large inlet on the west side of Prince of Wales Island. It was named after the Victorian Arctic explorer and Royal Navy officer Sir Erasmus Ommanney.

== Geography ==
Smith Bay and Scott Bay are eastern arms of Ommanney Bay.
