= Cameron Island =

Uninhabited island in Northern Canada

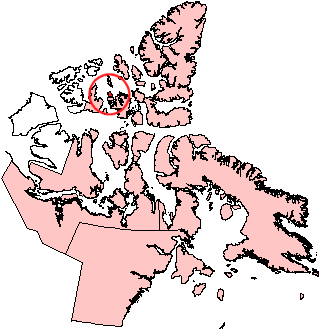
- Cameron Island, Nunavut

- Location in Nunavut Location in Canada

Geography
- Location: Arctic Ocean
- Coordinates: 76°30′N 103°51′W
- Archipelago: Queen Elizabeth Islands; Arctic Archipelago
- Area: 1,062.19 km^{2} (410.11 sq mi) (2026)
- Area rank: 48th in Canada & 316th worldwide
- Length: 42 km (26.1 mi)
- Width: 37–38 km (23–24 mi)

Administration
- Canada
- Territory: Nunavut
- Region: Qikiqtaaluk

Demographics
- Population: Uninhabited

Cameron Island is one of the uninhabited islands of the Queen Elizabeth Islands in the Arctic Archipelago in Nunavut, Canada. Located in the Arctic Ocean, close to Bathurst Island, it has an area of 1,062.19 km^{2} (410.11 sq mi), 42 to 43 km (26 to 27 mi) long and 47 to 38 km (29 to 24 mi) wide. Île Vanier lies immediately to the south, across the Arnott Strait.

== Commercial oil production ==
Cameron Island is notable as being the only site which has been developed for commercial oil production in the Arctic Archipelago. From 1985 to 1996 the double hulled tanker MV Arctic shipped the light crude from Bent Horn in the south-west of the island to Montreal. A total of 2.8 million barrels (450,000 m^{3}) was produced until the field was abandoned in 1996. The initial discovery, in 1974 by Panarctic Oils, reflected the urgency to find new sources of crude oil after the 1973 oil crisis. The abandonment in 1996 reflects the difficulties of exploiting the resource in this harsh environment, although the current production licence (held by Canada Southern Petroleum Ltd) expired in 2010 and could be extended. After abandonment, final clean-up occurred in 1999. Cameron Island is a desolate spot: a dark-hued landscape of low hills. Oil exploration and traffic on land were concentrated in the winter months, when winter roads of compacted snow across the Arctic tundra were used by heavy vehicles. Appropriate efforts were taken to minimise the damage to this fragile environment, but where the vegetation was damaged, increased depths of summer thaw occurred. Possibly the greatest concern was caused by the sumps at the well-sites, into which the toxic drilling muds were pumped. These basins, blasted out of the permafrost, relied on the gradual freeze-back of the ground to seal in the waste materials. Cameron Island was named in 1952 after Maxwell George Cameron (d. 1951), the chief cartographer of the surveys and mapping branch, Department of Mines and Technical Surveys.
