= Hassel Sound =

Natural waterway in the Qikiqtaaluk Region, Nunavut, Canada

- Location within Nunavut
- Location: Qikiqtaaluk Region, Nunavut
- Coordinates: 78°18′N 098°46′W
- Settlements: Uninhabited

Hassel Sound is an uninhabited natural waterway in the Qikiqtaaluk Region, Nunavut, Canada. It separates Ellef Ringnes Island to the west from Amund Ringnes Island to the east.
