= M'Clintock Channel =

- Location within Nunavut
- Coordinates: 72°00′N 102°00′W
- Basin countries: Nunavut, Canada
- Max. length: 270 km (170 mi)
- Max. width: 105 to 209 km (65 to 130 mi)

M'Clintock Channel (also spelled McClintock Channel) is located in the territory of Nunavut, Canada. The channel, an arm of the Arctic Ocean, divides Victoria Island from Prince of Wales Island. This channel is named after Sir Francis McClintock, an Irish explorer in the British Royal Navy, famous for his Canadian Arctic explorations. The channel is 270 km (170 mi) long, and between 105 and 209 km (65 and 130 mi) wide, making it one of the largest channels in the Arctic Archipelago.

The channel connects Ommanney Bay and Parry Channel to the northwest and Larsen Sound to the southeast. Umingmalik is on the southeast boundary of the channel.

There was another M'Clintock Channel located between Hudson Island and Hall Island, to the east of Loks Land at 62°32′N 64°15′W. However, the name is no longer in use.
