= Umingmalik =

Island in Nunavut, Canada

- Location within Nunavut Location within Canada

Geography
- Location: M'Clintock Channel
- Coordinates: 70°34′35″N 100°24′46″W
- Archipelago: Arctic Archipelago
- Area: 220 km^{2} (85 sq mi)

Administration
- Canada
- Territory: Nunavut

Demographics
- Population: Uninhabited

Umingmalik (formerly Gateshead Island) is an island located in the Kitikmeot Region of Nunavut, Canada. Located in M'Clintock Channel, the area of Gateshead Island is around 220 km^{2} (85 sq mi). It is an important polar bear denning area.

This is a different island than the one visited by Richard Collinson, commanding HMS Enterprise, while searching for John Franklin.
