= Peary Channel =

Waterway in Nunavut, Canada

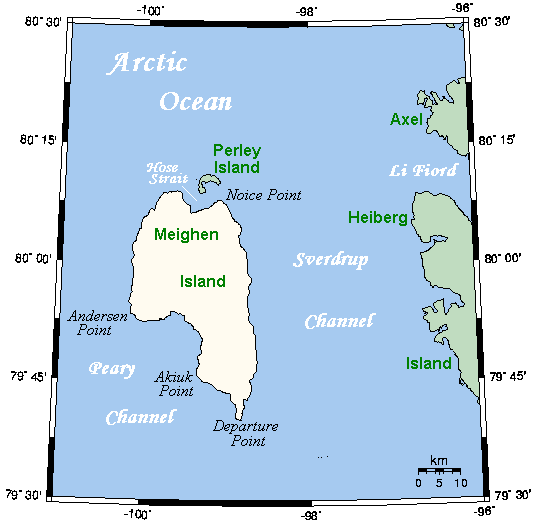

- Location within Nunavut
- Location: Nunavut
- Coordinates: 79°40′00″N 101°29′59″W
- Part of: Arctic Ocean
- Ocean/sea sources: Arctic Ocean
- Basin countries: Canada, Nunavut
- Max. length: 193 km (120 mi)
- Max. width: 97 km (60 mi)
- Frozen: Most of the year

The Peary Channel is a waterway in the territory of Nunavut. It is an arm of the Arctic Ocean, and it spreads southeast between Meighen Island to the north, Axel Heiberg Island to the east, Amund Ringnes Island to the south, and Ellef Ringnes Island to the west. The channel is approximately 193 km (120 mi) long and 97 km (60 mi) wide.
