= Sir William Parker Strait =

Strait in Nunavut, Canada

Coordinates: 76°36′34″N 100°39′15″W

Sir William Parker Strait is a waterway in the Qikiqtaaluk Region of Nunavut, Canada. It separates Helena Island (to the north-west) from Bathurst Island (to the south-east).
