= Île Vanier =

Uninhabited island in Nunavut, Canada

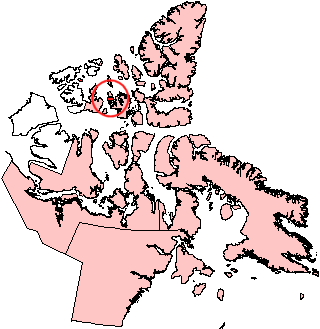
- Île Vanier, Nunavut.

- Location within Nunavut Location within Canada

Geography
- Location: Northern Canada
- Coordinates: 76°10′N 103°15′W
- Archipelago: Queen Elizabeth Islands; Arctic Archipelago
- Area: 1,122.77 km^{2} (433.50 sq mi) (2026)
- Area rank: 46th in Canada & 307th worldwide
- Length: 53 km (32.9 mi)
- Width: 35 km (21.7 mi)

Administration
- Canada
- Territory: Nunavut

Demographics
- Population: 0

Île Vanier is one of the uninhabited Queen Elizabeth Islands of the Arctic Archipelago in Nunavut, Canada. Located at 76°10′N 103°15′W, it has an area of 1,122.77 km^{2} (433.50 sq mi). It has a length of 53 km (33 mi) and a width of 35 km (22 mi). To the north, across the Arnott Strait, is Cameron Island, and to the south, across the Pearse Strait, is Massey Island. The first known European sighting of the island was by Robert Dawes Aldrich in 1851, but its insular nature was not proven until the 1950s. The Adam Range, which is part of the Arctic Cordillera, reaches elevations in excess of 220 m (720 ft).
