= Prince of Wales Island (Nunavut) =

Uninhabited in the Arctic Archipelago

Prince of Wales Prince-de-Galles (French)
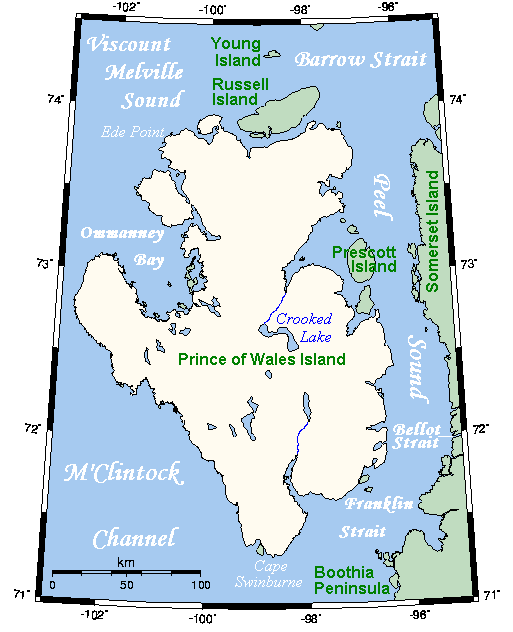
- Prince of Wales Island, Nunavut

- Location within Nunavut

- Location within Nunavut Location within Canada

Geography
- Location: Northern Canada
- Coordinates: 72°40′N 99°00′W
- Archipelago: Arctic Archipelago
- Area: 33,307.98 km^{2} (12,860.28 sq mi) (2026)
- Area rank: 10th in Canada & 40th worldwide
- Highest elevation: 424 m (1391 ft)
- Highest point: 73°48′26″N 97°50′14″W

Administration
- Canada
- Territory: Nunavut

Demographics
- Population: Uninhabited

Prince of Wales Island (Note: French: Île du Prince-de-Galles) is an Arctic island in Nunavut, Canada. This uninhabited island is one of the larger members of the Arctic Archipelago, it lies between Victoria Island and Somerset Island and is south of the Queen Elizabeth Islands. For administrative purposes, it is divided between Qikiqtaaluk and Kitikmeot regions. There are no permanent settlements on the island.

== Geography ==
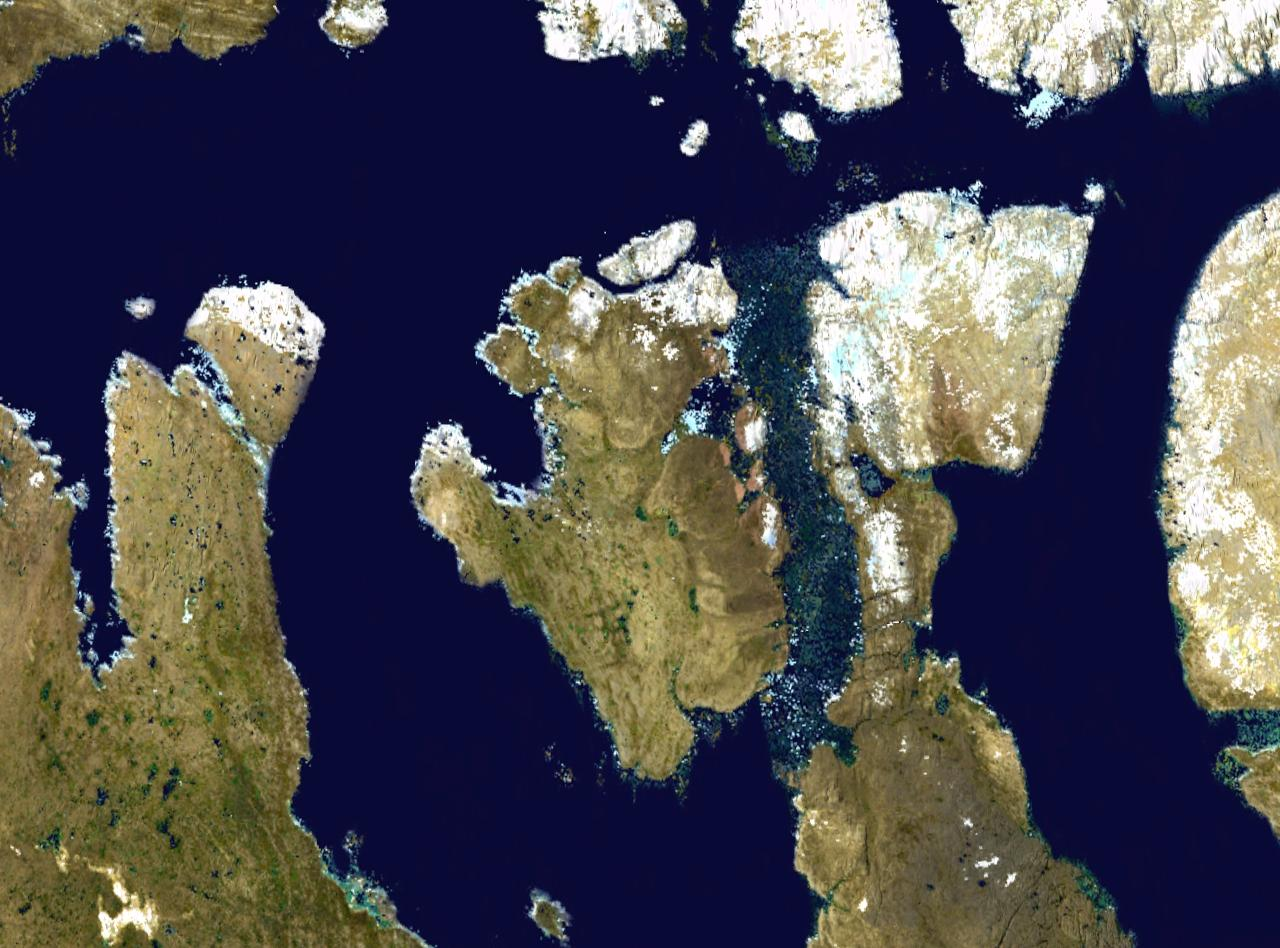
NASA satellite photo montage of Prince of Wales Island and its neighbours

Prince of Wales Island is a low tundra-covered island with an irregular coastline deeply indented by Ommanney Bay in the west and Browne Bay in the east. Ommanney Bay is named after Admiral Sir Erasmus Ommanney of the Royal Navy who explored the area as part of the search for Franklin's lost expedition. The island's area has been estimated at 33,307.98 km^{2} (12,860.28 sq mi). Prince of Wales Island is the world's 40th largest island and the 10th largest in Canada. Its highest known point—with an elevation of 424 m (1,391 ft)—is an unnamed spot at 73°48′26″N 97°50′14″W in the island's far northeastern end, overlooking the Baring Channel, which separates the island from nearby Russell Island.

== History ==
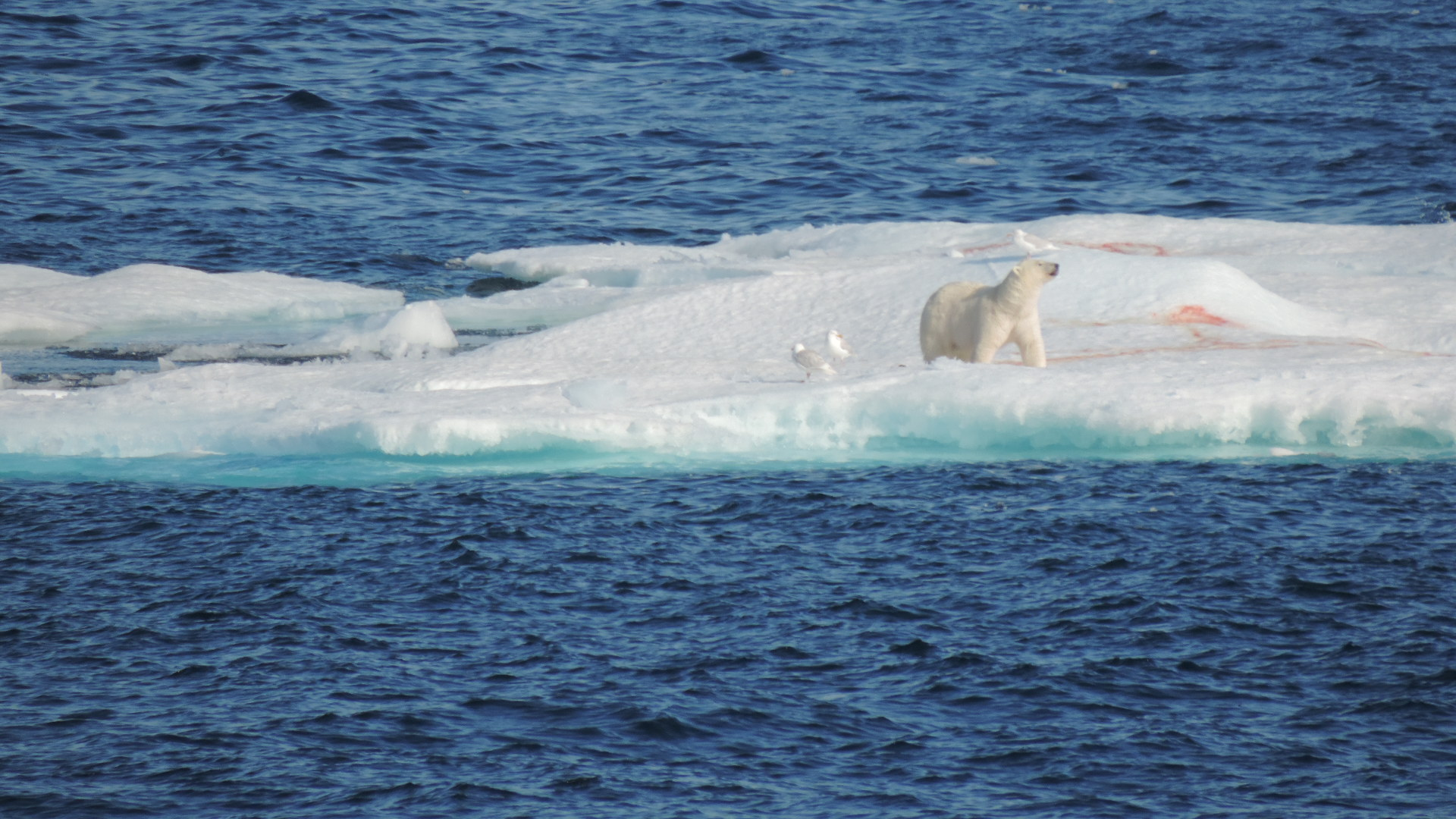
Polar bear on an ice floe in Franklin Strait east of Prince of Wales Island in September 2019; the bloody trail shows its prey was dragged over the floe.

Its European discovery came in 1851 by Leopold McClintock's sledge parties during the searches for John Franklin's last expedition. McClintock, along with Sherard Osborn and William Browne, charted the northern half of the island. Its southern half was charted by Allen Young in 1859. It was named after Albert Edward, eldest son of Queen Victoria, then ten years old and Prince of Wales. He later became King Edward VII.

== In popular culture ==
The CBC series North of North is set in the fictional town of Ice Cove, which is situated on Prince of Wales Island.

== See also ==
- Lists of islands
- Royal eponyms in Canada
