= Ellef Ringnes Island =

Uninhabited island in the Qikiqtaaluk Region, Nunavut, Canada

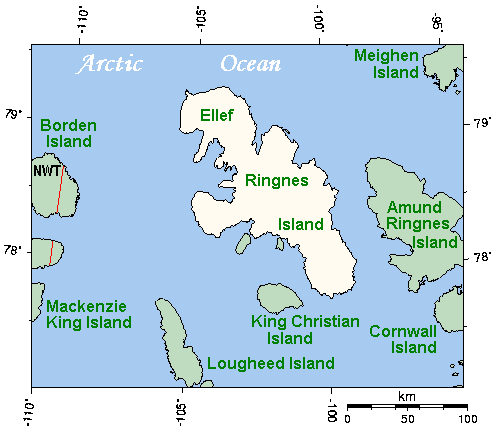
- Closeup of Ellef Ringnes Island and neighbouring islands

- Location within Nunavut Location within Canada

Geography
- Location: Arctic Ocean
- Coordinates: 78°30′N 102°15′W
- Archipelago: Sverdrup Islands; Queen Elizabeth Islands; Arctic Archipelago
- Area: 11,350.45 km^{2} (4,382.43 sq mi) (2026)
- Area rank: 16th in Canada & 68th worldwide
- Highest elevation: 260 m (850 ft)
- Highest point: Isachsen Dome

Administration
- Canada
- Territory: Nunavut
- Region: Qikiqtaaluk
- Largest settlement: Isachsen (pop. 0)

Demographics
- Population: Uninhabited

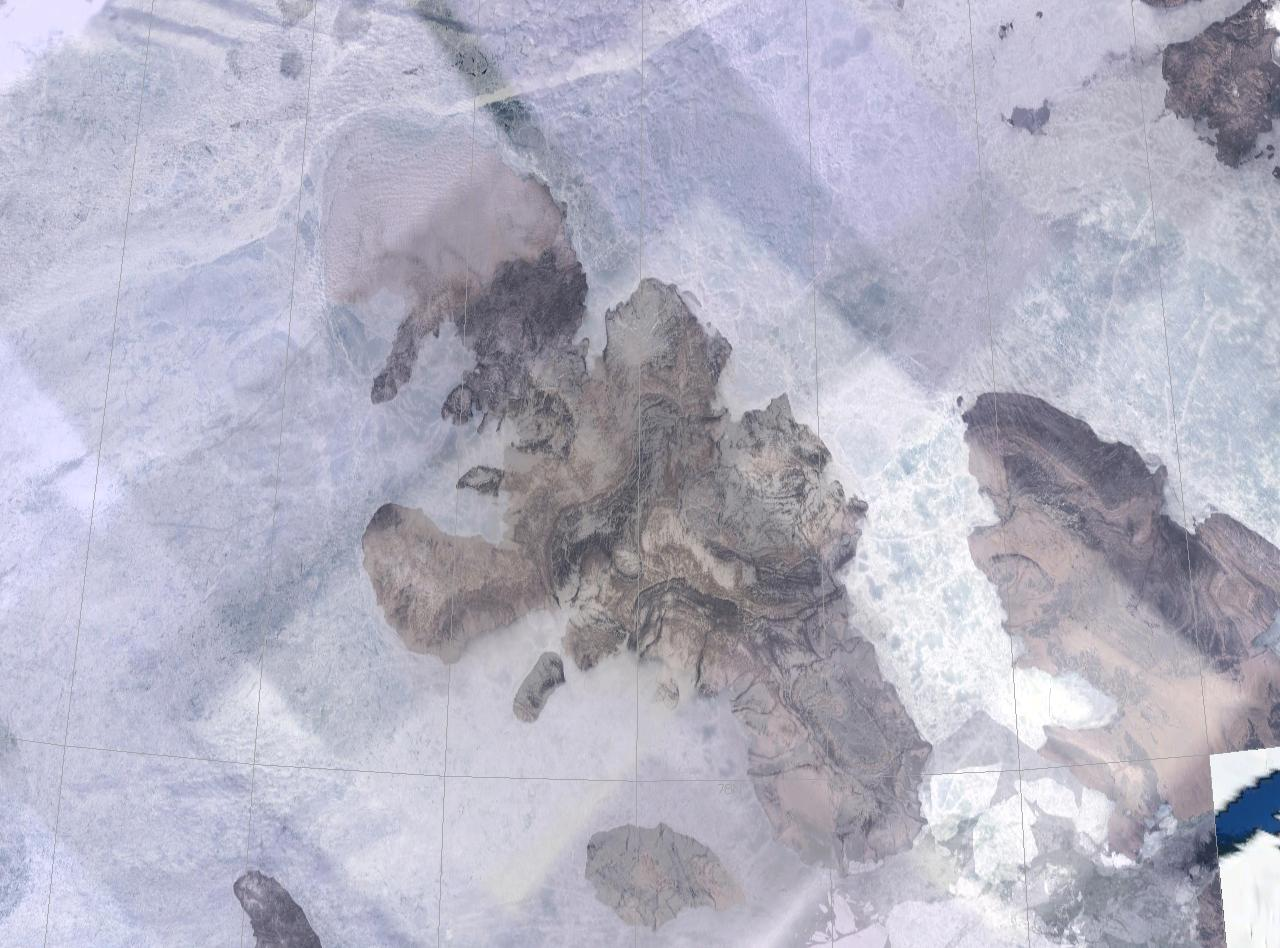
NASA Landsat photo of Ellef Ringnes Island

Ellef Ringnes Island is an uninhabited island and one of the Sverdrup Islands in the Qikiqtaaluk Region, Nunavut, Canada. A member of the Queen Elizabeth Islands and Arctic Archipelago, it is located in the Arctic Ocean, east of Borden Island, and west of Amund Ringnes Island. It has an area of 11,350.45 km^{2} (4,382.43 sq mi), making it the 68th largest island in the world (slightly larger than Jamaica, the 71st largest) and Canada's 16th largest island. Its highest mount is 260 m (850 ft).

The island was named by Otto Sverdrup for Oslo brewer Ellef Ringnes, one of the sponsors of his expedition. It was first sighted by Europeans in 1901 by one of Sverdrup's men. The island was then claimed by Norway from 1902 until the claim was relinquished in favour of Canada in 1930.

== History ==
The first known European sighting of Ellef Ringnes Island was in 1901 by a sledging party consisting of Gunerius Isachsen and Sverre Hassel, members of the Second Norwegian Arctic Expedition of 1898–1902, which was under the command of Otto Sverdrup. The island was named to honour Ellef Ringnes, one of the principal patrons of the expedition. At the time of the discovery of Ellef Ringnes Island, the expedition was based at Goose Fiord on the south coast of Ellesmere Island. Isachsen and Hassel made their initial sighting of Ellef Ringnes Island on April 23 that year, as they rounded the southwest corner of Amund Ringnes Island, an island they had sighted and partly explored the previous year. The following day, Isachsen and Hassel travelled across Hassel Sound making a landfall at the southern extremity of the island. In the course of the following 20 days, they succeeded in circumnavigating Ellef Ringnes. The resulting map and notes on geological specimens are published in Otto Sverdrup's narrative New Land (1904). In 1948. the Canadian Department of Transport and the United States Weather Bureau jointly established a meteorological station at Isachsen. The station was in operation for thirty years. Drilling took place on the island in the seventies by Panarctic Oils. A High Arctic Weather Station (HAWS) called Isachsen lies on the west coast of the island. It was opened April 3, 1948 as part of a joint Canada-United States military effort to support a weather station network. When it closed on September 19, 1978, it was replaced with an automatic weather station. The station represented the only known permanent human settlement of the island. In 1959-1961 it was the base of operation for The Polar Continental Shelf Project administered by the then Department of Mines and Technical Surveys now Natural Resources Canada; Polar Shelf as it was known supports research throughout the Arctic, it is now based in Resolute. In the late 1970s there was also a fair amount of oil exploration with a new runway built in the vicinity of the Isachsen Dome; no significant amount of gas or oil was reportedly found. Ellef Ringnes Island was the last landmass to be visited by the Earth's wandering north magnetic pole. In April and May 1994, Larry Newitt, of the Geological Survey of Canada, and Charles Barton, of the Geoscience Australia, conducted a survey to determine the average position of the north magnetic pole at that time. They established a temporary magnetic observatory on Lougheed Island, close to the predicted position of the pole. They determined that the average position of the north magnetic pole in 1994 was located on the Noice Peninsula, southwest Ellef Ringnes Island, at 78°18′N 104°00′W.

== Geology ==
The island is characterized by broad lowlands and locally by dissected uplands which reflect the diversity of structures and lithological characters of the bedrock formations. The island is rimmed by low shelving coastal areas, domal structures (salt dome) with cores of diapiric anhydrite and secondary gypsum constitute striking features of the landscape. Two major structural provinces of the Arctic Archipelago are represented: the Sverdrup basin which includes the greater part of the island and preponderant thickness of sediments: and the Arctic Coastal Plain, an area at the north-eastern extremity of the island. These salt domes create the highest topographic features. While most of the island is flat lying, the salt domes stand out clearly on satellite. There are seven domes, Dumbbells, Contour, Hoodoo, Malloch, Haakon, Helicopter and Isachsen Dome (260 m [850 ft]) which is the highest point on the island. On the north part of the island, there is a concentration of gabbro and diabase dikes and sills. Most of the rock is Jurassic to Cretaceous with the northern part (Isachsen Peninsula) being Tertiary. The Jurassic and Cretaceous rocks are varying formations of sandstone and shale. The sediment was deposited in the Sverdrup Basin. The salt diapirs are Carboniferous.

== Flora and fauna ==
Ellef Ringnes Island is interesting to biologists because of its extremely rigorous Arctic environment and its resulting meagre flora and fauna. Together with Amund Ringnes, Borden, Brock, King Christian, Lougheed, Mackenzie King and Meighen islands (the so-called northwestern Queen Elizabeth Islands) it constitutes the most barren part of the high Arctic region. Some idea of its bleakness is conveyed by the remarks of others who worked there. Vilhjalmur Stefansson (1921), on visiting Ellef Ringnes in June 1916, wrote "I did not see a blade of grass and the district struck me as the most barren I had even seen"; S. D. MacDonald (1961) who spent the field season of 1954 at Isachsen, stated, "My immediate impression of Isachsen was of a region of utter desolation". Summers at Isachsen, the richest locality on the island, are colder than at any other Arctic weather station. Accordingly, Ellef Ringnes probably supports fewer forms of life than any other ice-free Arctic land mass of comparable size (13,000 km^{2} [5,000 mi^{2}]). The total confirmed flora comprises 49 species of vascular plants and about 85 of fungi; only 10 species of mammals and 15 of birds have been recorded on the island. Mammals include muskox, Peary caribou, polar bears and Arctic foxes
