= Bathurst Island (Nunavut) =

Uninhabited member of the Queen Elizabeth Islands, Nunavut, Canada

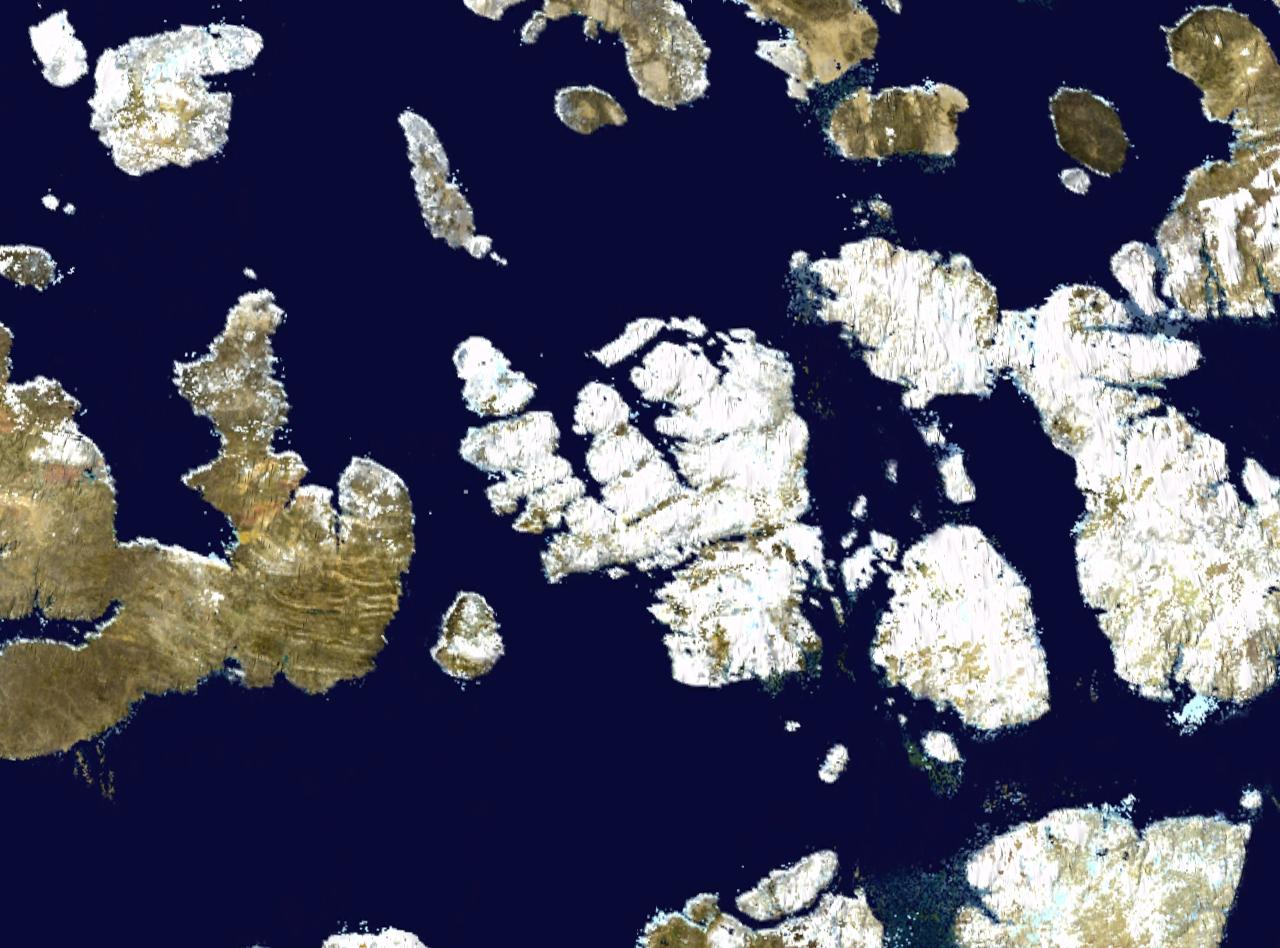
- NASA satellite photo montage of Bathurst Island at centre. Viscount Melville Sound, part of the Northwest Passage, adjoins it to the south.

- Location of Bathurst Island

- Location within Nunavut Location within Canada

Geography
- Location: Northern Canada
- Coordinates: 75°45′N 100°00′W
- Archipelago: Queen Elizabeth Islands; Arctic Archipelago
- Area: 16,050.61 km^{2} (6,197.18 sq mi) (2026)
- Area rank: 13th in Canada & 54th worldwide
- Length: 117 mi (188 km)
- Width: 63–94 mi (101–151 km)

Administration
- Canada
- Territory: Nunavut

Demographics
- Population: Uninhabited (2021)

Bathurst Island is one of the Queen Elizabeth Islands in Nunavut, Canada. It is a member of the Arctic Archipelago. An uninhabited island, the area is estimated at 116,050.61 km^{2} (44,807.39 sq mi), and about 260 km (160 mi) long and from 80 to 161 km (50 to 100 mi) wide, making it Canada's 13th largest island. It is located between Devon Island and Cornwallis Island in the east, and Melville Island in the west. Four small islands of Cameron, Vanier, Massey and Alexander lie in its northwest. The island is low-lying with few parts higher than 330 m (1,080 ft) in elevation. The highest point is 412 m (1,352 ft) at Stokes Mountain in the Stokes Range. This in turn forms part of the Arctic Cordillera mountain system. Good soil conditions produce abundant vegetation and support a more prolific wildlife population than other Arctic islands. The island contains both the International Biological Program site Polar Bear Pass and Qausuittuq National Park.

== History ==
The island was first inhabited by Independence I culture peoples around 2000 BC. They were followed by Independence II, Pre-Dorset, and Dorset cultures. On the eastern coast lies Brooman Point Village. The site has been occupied by the Dorset, Paleo-Eskimo and the Thule people around AD 1000, conceivably during a warmer climate episode. At the time of European arrival in the 1800s, nobody was living there, but Inuit in the region likely knew of its abundant wildlife, and possibly travelled there on hunting trips. William Edward Parry was the first European to discover the island in 1819, charting its southern coast. It was named for Henry Bathurst, 3rd Earl Bathurst, British Secretary of State for War and the Colonies 1812–1827. Robert Dawes Aldrich charted much of its west coast in 1851, while George Henry Richards and Sherard Osborn charted its north coast in 1853. The Earth's North magnetic pole tracked northwards across Bathurst and Seymour Islands during the 1960s and 1970s. The Canadian National Museum of Natural Sciences, led by renowned Arctic biologist Stewart D. Macdonald, curator of Vertebrate Ethology, established a permanent High Arctic Research Station there in 1973. Located on the Goodsir River in Polar Bear Pass, the station was staffed seasonally until the 1980s.

== See also ==
- Lists of islands
