= List of islands of North America =

Overview of North American islands

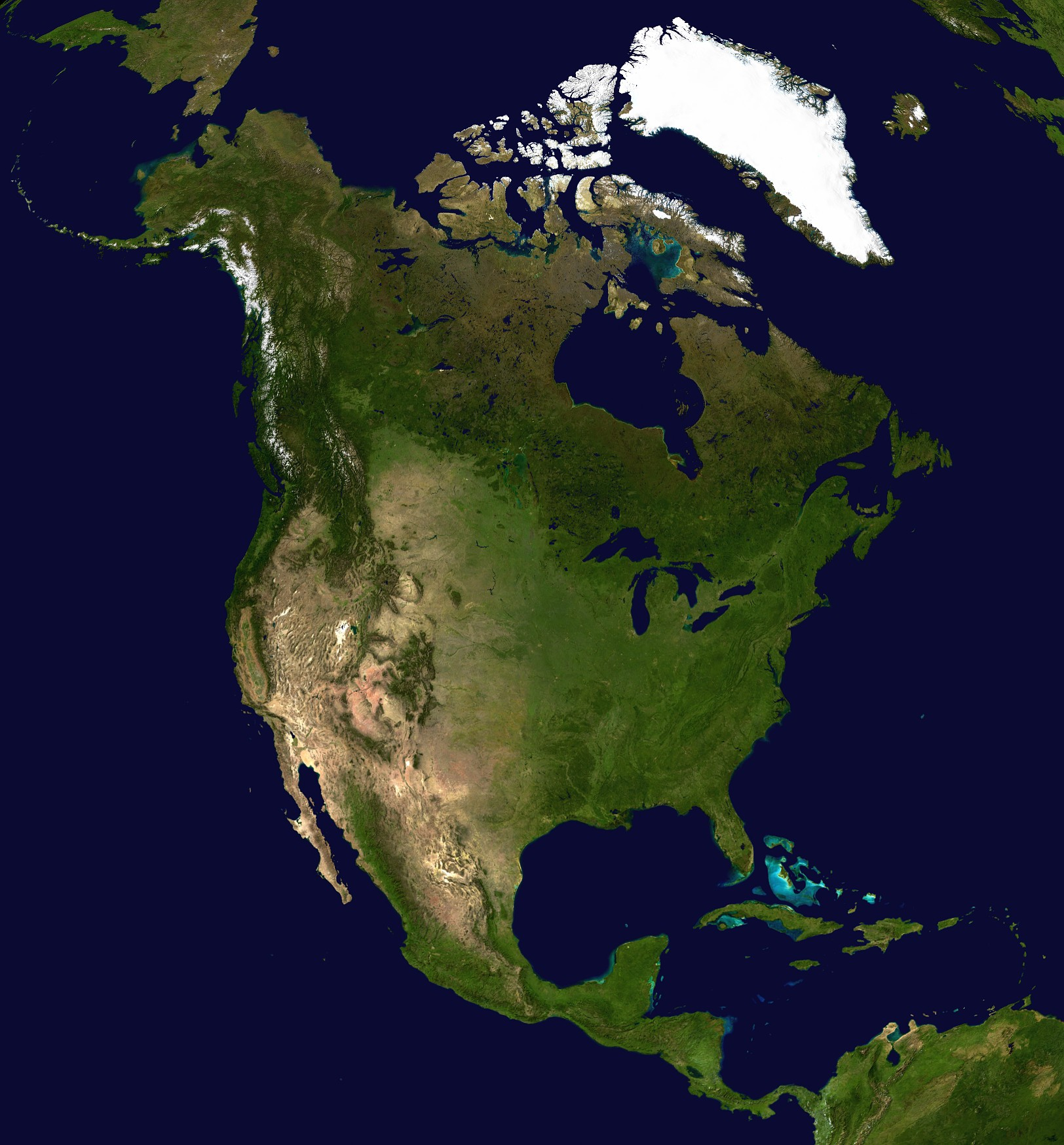
A composite satellite photograph of North America in orthographic projection

The following is a list of the major island groups of North America.

== Arctic Ocean ==
- Islands of the western Arctic Ocean:
  - Canadian Arctic Archipelago
    - Baffin Island, largest island of Canada and the world's 5th largest island
    - Victoria Island, world's 8th largest island
    - Banks Island, world's 24th largest island
    - Southampton Island, world's 34th largest island
    - Prince of Wales Island, world's 40th largest island
    - Somerset Island, world's 46th largest island
    - King William Island, world's 61st largest island
    - Bylot Island, world's 72nd largest island
    - Prince Charles Island, world's 78th largest island
    - Queen Elizabeth Islands
      - Alexander Island
      - Baillie-Hamilton Island
      - Borden Island, world's 171st largest island
      - Ellesmere Island, world's 10th largest island and 37th tallest island
      - Ward Hunt Island
      - Cornwall Island, world's 186th largest island
      - Eglinton Island, world's 249th largest island
      - Graham Island, world's 268th largest island
      - Lougheed Island, world's 275th largest island
      - Byam Martin Island, world's 298th largest island
      - Île Vanier, world's 302nd largest island
      - Cameron Island, world's 314th largest island
      - Brock Island
      - North Kent Island
      - Emerald Isle
      - Massey Island
      - Little Cornwallis Island
      - Coburg Island
      - Helena Island
      - Griffith Island
      - Hoved Island
      - Lowther Island
      - Buckingham Island
      - Beechey Island
      - Seymour Island
      - Browne Island
      - Cocked Hat Island
      - Crescent Island
      - Des Voeux Island
      - Dundas Island
      - Edmund Walker Island
      - Eight Bears Island
      - Ekins Island
      - Exmouth Island
      - Fairholme Island
      - Fitzwilliam Owen Island
      - Garrett Island
      - Grosvenor Island
      - Houston Stewart Island
      - Hyde Parker Island
      - Île Marc
      - John Barrow Island
      - Margaret Island
      - Nookap Island
      - Norman Lockyer Island
      - Patterson Island
      - Philpots Island
      - Pim Island
      - Pioneer Island
      - Princess Royal Island
      - Skraeling Island
      - Spit Island (Kate Island)
      - Stupart Island
      - Table Island
      - Thor Island
      - Truro Island
      - Devon Island, world's now moved down to second uninhabited landmass and 27th largest island
      - Melville Island, world's 33rd largest island
      - Bathurst Island, world's 54th largest island
      - Prince Patrick Island, world's 55th largest island
      - Cornwallis Island, world's 96th largest island
      - Mackenzie King Island, world's 115th largest island
      - Moore Island
    - Sverdrup Islands
      - Axel Heiberg Island, world's 32nd largest island
      - Ellef Ringnes Island, world's 69th largest island
      - Amund Ringnes Island, world's 111th largest island
      - King Christian Island
      - Meighen Island
      - Stor Island
      - Haig-Thomas Island
      - Hat Island
      - Ulvingen Island
  - Islands of Hudson Bay
    - Coats Island, world's 107th largest island
    - Belcher Islands
      - Bradbury Island
      - Broomfield Island
      - Bun Island
      - Cake Island
      - Camsell Island
      - Dove Island
      - Fair Island
      - Flaherty Island
      - Innetalling Island
      - Karlay Island
      - La Duke Island
      - Johnnys Island
      - Mata Island
      - Nero Island
      - Loaf Island
      - Mavor Island
      - Moore Island
      - Ney Island
      - Kugong Island
      - O'Leary Island
      - Range Island
      - Renouf Island
      - Snape Island
      - Split Island
      - Tukarak Island
      - Twin Cairns Island
      - Walton Island
      - Wiegand Island
    - Islands of James Bay
      - Akimiski Island, world's 162nd largest island
      - Big Island
      - Carey Island (Cary Island)
      - Charlton Island
      - Grey Goose Island
      - Gull Island
      - Jacob Island (Wood Island)
      - Moore Island
      - North Twin Island
      - South Twin Island
      - Spencer Island
      - Stag Island
      - Sunday Island
      - Trodely Island (Trodley Island)
      - Walter Island
      - Weston Island

== Greenland ==
- Greenland, world's largest and 11th tallest island
  - Qeqertarsuaq (Disko Island), world's 85th largest island
  - Milne Land
  - Traill Island
  - Ymer Island
  - Geographical Society Island
  - Clavering Island
  - Nares Land
  - Shannon Island
- The following islands are usually associated with Europe rather than North America, despite lying closer to Greenland than to Scandinavia:
  - Iceland, world's 18th largest island
  - Jan Mayen
  - Svalbard Archipelago
    - Spitsbergen, world's 35th largest island
    - Nordaustlandet, world's 58th largest island
    - Edgeoya
    - Barentsoya

== North Atlantic Ocean ==
- Islands of the western North Atlantic Ocean:
  - Bermuda Islands
    - Bermuda
  - Atlantic Coastal Islands
    - Florida Keys
      - Key West
      - Key Largo
    - Merritt Island
    - Sea Islands
      - Hilton Head Island
      - Port Royal Island
      - Johns Island
      - Saint Helena Island
      - Edisto Island
    - Cayman Islands
    - Outer Banks
    - Staten Island
    - Manhattan Island, most densely populated island of the Americas
    - Long Island, largest Atlantic island of the United States, most populous island of the United States, and the world's 17th most populous island
      - New York Barrier Islands
    - Block Island
    - Conanicut Island
    - Aquidneck Island (Rhode Island)
    - Elizabeth Islands
    - Martha's Vineyard
    - Nantucket Island
    - Monomoy Island
    - Boston Harbor Islands
    - Mount Desert Island
    - Cape Breton Island, world's 77th largest island
    - Prince Edward Island, world's 104th largest island
    - Anticosti Island, world's 90th largest island
  - Newfoundland, largest Atlantic island of Canada and the world's 16th largest island
    - Ile de Saint-Pierre
    - Ile de Miquelon, largest island of Saint Pierre and Miquelon

Islands of the west North Atlantic Ocean:

- Flores Island (Azores)
- Corvo Island

== North Pacific Ocean ==
- Islands of the eastern North Pacific Ocean:
  - Islands of the Bering Sea
    - Pribilof Islands
      - Saint Paul Island
      - St. George Island
      - Otter Island
      - Walrus Island
    - Saint Lawrence Island, world's 113th largest island
    - Diomede Islands
      - Big Diomede Island
      - Little Diomede Island
    - King Island
    - Saint Matthew Island
    - Karaginsky Island
  - Aleutian Islands
    - Fox Islands
      - Unimak Island, world's 134th largest island, world's 28th tallest island
      - Umnak Island, world's 223rd largest island
      - Unalaska Island, world's 174th largest island
      - Amaknak Island (Umaknak Island)
      - Akutan Island
      - Akun Island
      - Sanak Island
    - Islands of Four Mountains
      - Amukta Island
      - Chagulak Island
      - Yunaska Island
      - Herbert Island
      - Carlisle Island
      - Chuginadak Island
      - Uliaga Island
      - Kagamil Island
    - Andreanof Islands
      - Tanaga Island
      - Kanaga Island
      - Adak Island
      - Kagalaska Island
      - Great Sitkin Island
      - Little Tanaga Island
      - Atka Island, world's 313th largest island
      - Amlia Island
      - Seguam Island
      - Delarof Islands
        - Gareloi Island
        - Amatignak Island
        - Ilak Island
        - Kavalga Island
        - Ogliuga Island
        - Skagul Island
        - Tanadak Island
        - Ugidak Island
        - Ulak Island
        - Unalga Island
    - Rat Islands
      - Kiska Island
      - Little Kiska Island
      - Segula Island
    - Buldir Island
    - Near Islands
    - Commander Islands
  - Kodiak Archipelago
    - Kodiak Island, largest island of Alaska and the world's 80th largest island
  - Islands of the Gulf of Alaska
    - Montague Island
  - Alexander Archipelago
    - ABC Islands
      - Admiralty Island
      - Baranof Island
      - Chichagof Island, world's 109th largest island
    - Dall Island
    - Kupreanof Island
    - Prince of Wales Island, world's 97th largest island
    - Revillagigedo Island
    - Wrangell Island
  - Haida Gwaii
    - Graham Island, world's 101st largest island
    - Moresby Island
  - Vancouver Island, largest Pacific island of Canada and the world's 43rd largest island
  - Islands of the Salish Sea
    - Discovery Islands
    - Texada Island
    - San Juan Archipelago
      - Gulf Islands
      - San Juan Islands
        - Orcas Island, second largest island of Washington
    - Whidbey Island
  - Channel Islands of California
    - Santa Cruz Island, largest island of California
  - Isla de Cedros
  - Islands of the Gulf of California
    - Isla Ángel de la Guarda
    - Tiburón Island, largest island of Mexico
  - Guadalupe Island
  - Revillagigedo Islands
    - Isla Socorro
  - Islas Marías
  - Clipperton Island
  - Isla Espiritu Santo, largest island of El Salvador
  - Isla del Coco, largest island of Costa Rica
  - Isla de Coiba, largest island of Panama
  - Pearl Islands
    - Isla del Rey

=== Hawaii ===
- Hawaii Islands
  - Northwestern Hawaiian Islands

== Inland islands ==
- Lake islands of North America:
  - Atlin Lake,
    - Theresa Island, highest elevation inside a freshwater lake in North America at 2059m
  - Lake Huron
    - Manitoulin Island, world's largest inland island
    - Saint Joseph Island, world's 8th largest inland island
    - Drummond Island, world's 9th largest inland island
    - Thirty Thousand Islands
    - Mackinac Island
  - Lake Superior
    - Isle Royale, world's 6th largest inland island
    - Saint Ignace Island, world's 12th largest inland island
    - Michipicoten Island, world's 19th largest inland island
    - Madeline Island
  - Lake Erie
    - Mohawk Island
  - Lake Ontario
    - Thousand Islands
  - Lake Washington
    - Mercer Island
  - Lake Nicaragua
    - Ometepe, 11th largest inland island
    - Isla Zapatera
    - Solentiname Islands
  - Great Slave Lake
    - Simpson Islands
      - Big Simpson Island, world's 13th largest inland island
    - Blanchet Island, world's 14th largest inland island
    - Preble Island, world's 20th largest inland island
  - Manicouagan Reservoir
    - René-Levasseur Island, world's largest artificial island and 2nd largest inland island
  - Grand Lake on the Island of Newfoundland
    - Glover Island, world's 18th largest inland island
- River islands of North America:
  - Saint Lawrence River
    - Île de Montréal, most populous island of Canada
  - Niagara River
    - Grand Island
    - Navy Island
    - Goat Island
    - Dufferin Islands
  - Hudson River
    - Schodack Island
    - Westerlo (Castle) Island
  - Susquehanna River
    - McCormick Island
    - Wade Island

== See also ==
- Clipperton Island
- List of islands by area
- List of islands by highest point
- List of islands by population
- List of islands in lakes
- List of islands of Central America
- List of islands of South America
- List of the highest islands of North America
- Navassa Island
- Outline of North America
