= 97th meridian west =

Line of longitude

97th meridian west (interactive map)

The 97th meridian west of Greenwich is a line of longitude that extends from the North Pole across the Arctic Ocean, North America, the Gulf of Mexico, the Pacific Ocean, the Southern Ocean, and Antarctica to the South Pole.

The 97th meridian west forms a great circle with the 83rd meridian east.

== From Pole to Pole ==
Starting at the North Pole and heading south to the South Pole, the 97th meridian west passes through:

Co-ordinates	Country, territory or sea	Notes
90°0′N 97°0′W	Arctic Ocean	Passing just west of Axel Heiberg Island, Nunavut, Canada (at 80°5′N 96°46′W); Passing just east of the Fay Islands, Nunavut, Canada (at 79°38′N 97°7′W)
78°44′N 97°0′W	Canada	Nunavut — Amund Ringnes Island
77°48′N 97°0′W	Unnamed waterbody	Passing just east of Crescent Island, Nunavut, Canada (at 77°0′N 97°5′W)
76°58′N 97°0′W	Canada	Nunavut — Pioneer Island
76°57′N 97°0′W	Penny Strait	Passing just east of Spit Island, Nunavut, Canada (at 76°49′N 97°0′W); Passing just west of Devon Island, Nunavut, Canada (at 76°44′N 96°58′W); Passing just east of John Barrow Island, Nunavut, Canada (at 76°36′N 97°6′W); Passing just east of Hyde Parker Island, Nunavut, Canada (at 76°29′N 97°5′W)
76°14′N 97°0′W	Queens Channel	Passing just west of Des Voeux Island, Nunavut, Canada (at 76°10′N 96°58′W); Passing just west of Milne Island, Nunavut, Canada (at 75°36′N 96°58′W)
75°30′N 97°0′W	Canada	Nunavut — Little Cornwallis Island
75°27′N 97°0′W	McDougall Sound	Passing just east of Truro Island, Nunavut, Canada (at 75°17′N 97°6′W)
75°0′N 97°0′W	Parry Channel	
73°45′N 97°0′W	Canada	Nunavut — Prince of Wales Island
73°37′N 97°0′W	Peel Sound	
73°16′N 97°0′W	Canada	Nunavut — Vivian Island and Prescott Island
72°56′N 97°0′W	Browne Bay	Passing just west of Pandora Island, Nunavut, Canada (at 72°47′N 96°58′W)
72°44′N 97°0′W	Young Bay	
72°38′N 97°0′W	Canada	Nunavut — Prince of Wales Island and Hobday Island
71°43′N 97°0′W	Franklin Strait	
71°11′N 97°0′W	Larsen Sound	
70°7′N 97°0′W	James Ross Strait	Passing just east of the Clarence Islands, Nunavut, Canada (at 69°53′N 97°12′W)
69°33′N 97°0′W	Canada	Nunavut — King William Island
68°34′N 97°0′W	Simpson Strait	
68°21′N 97°0′W	Canada	Nunavut; Manitoba — from 60°0′N 97°0′W, passing through Lake Winnipeg. Also passing just east of the city of Winnipeg
49°0′N 97°0′W	United States	Minnesota; North Dakota — from 47°50′N 97°0′W; South Dakota — from 45°56′N 97°0′W; Nebraska — from 42°46′N 97°0′W; Kansas — from 40°0′N 97°0′W; Oklahoma — from 37°0′N 97°0′W; Texas — from 33°57′N 97°0′W, bisecting the Dallas-Fort Worth Metroplex, then passing directly through the city of Victoria and San José Island
27°54′N 97°0′W	Gulf of Mexico	
20°30′N 97°0′W	Mexico	Veracruz; Puebla — for about 6 km from 19°18′N 97°0′W; Veracruz — from 19°14′N 97°0′W; Puebla — from 18°30′N 97°0′W; Oaxaca — from 18°11′N 97°0′W
15°47′N 97°0′W	Pacific Ocean	
60°0′S 97°0′W	Southern Ocean	
71°45′S 97°0′W	Antarctica	Unclaimed territory

== See also ==
- 96th meridian west
- 98th meridian west
