= Twin Islands =

Twin Islands, or minor variations thereof, may refer to:

In Canada

- Twin Islands (British Columbia)
- Twin Islands (Nunavut)
  - North Twin Island (Nunavut)
  - South Twin Island (Nunavut)
- Twin Islands, of Eagle Lake (Ontario)
  - North Twin Island (Eagle Lake)
  - South Twin Island (Eagle Lake)

In India

- Twin Islands (Andaman and Nicobar Islands)

In the USA

- Twin Island, New York
- Lower Twin Island, West Virginia
- Upper Twin Island, West Virginia
- North Twin Island, Wisconsin
- South Twin Island, Wisconsin

== See also ==
- Twin Islets, Tasmania, Australia
