= List of islands of Central America =

The following is a list of islands of Central America.

== Islands ==
- Islands of Belize
  - Inner Islands
    - Ambergris Caye
    - Blackadore Caye
    - Cayo Espanto
    - Caye Caulker
    - Caye Chapel
    - Goff's Caye
- Islands of Costa Rica
- Islands of El Salvador
- Islands of Guatemala
- Islands of Honduras
- Islands of Nicaragua
- Islands of Panama

== See also ==
- Central America
  - Belize
  - Costa Rica
  - El Salvador
  - Guatemala
  - Honduras
  - Nicaragua
  - Panama
- List of Central America-related topics
- List of islands
  - List of islands in the Caribbean
  - List of islands of North America
  - List of islands of South America
