= Grey Goose Island =

Island of Canada

Grey Goose
- Location within Nunavut Location within Canada

Geography
- Location: James Bay
- Coordinates: 53.9°N 79.9°W
- Archipelago: Arctic Archipelago

Administration
- Canada
- Nunavut: Nunavut
- Region: Qikiqtaaluk

Demographics
- Population: Uninhabited

Grey Goose Island is one of several, larger, uninhabited Canadian arctic islands in Nunavut, Canada located within the midsection of James Bay. Other comparable islands in the area include the Bear Islands, North and South Twin Islands, Spencer Island, Sunday Island, and Walter Island. La Grande River and the Cree village of Chisasibi, Quebec are 65 km (40 mi) to the southeast.

The island is low-lying and flat, dominated by rock and sand. It is devoid of trees, although there are grasses and other hardy plants. It is frequented by Arctic fox, Ringed seal, Beluga whale, caribou, and polar bears. A major migration route for geese, notable bird populations include American pipit, Arctic tern, black guillemot, common eider, common loon, great black-backed gull, gyrfalcon, herring gull, Pacific loon, purple sandpiper, red-necked phalarope, red-throated loon, and semipalmated plover.

== History ==
Grey Goose Island's history includes a visit by Robert J. Flaherty in 1910 during the First MacKenzie Expedition, as well as the stranding of the MV North Star IV in 1961 after it hit an uncharted rock.

During the Cold War period of 1958 to 1965, Canada permitted the United States to practise high-altitude photographic reconnaissance over Grey Goose Island with the RB-52C Stratofortress. M120 photoflash bombs were used, and possibly practice bombs. Small-calibre machine gun rounds may have been fired. Because of the possibility that unexploded explosive ordnance or other munitions are buried in the ground, or may still remain on the island, Canada's Department of National Defence has retained the area. However, occasionally, the island's wildlife resources are harvested by the Cree.
