= Moore Island =

Moore Island may refer to one of several islands;

- Moore Island (Belcher Islands), an uninhabited island in the Qikiqtaaluk Region, Nunavut
- Moore Island (Boat Passage), an uninhabited island in the Qikiqtaaluk Region, Nunavut
- Moore Island (Hopewell Islands), an uninhabited island in the Qikiqtaaluk Region, Nunavut
- Moore Island (Intrepid Passage), an uninhabited island in the Qikiqtaaluk Region, Nunavut
- Moor Island, formerly Moore Island, an uninhabited island in the Kivalliq Region, Nunavut

== See also ==
- Moore's Island, one of the districts of the Bahamas, on the Abaco Islands
- Moore Islands, a group of small islands in the North Coast region of British Columbia
