= Dixon Island =

Dixon Island, Dixson Island or Dikson Island and similar may refer to:

== Dikson ==
- Dikson Island, Russia

== Dixon ==
=== Australia ===
- Dixon Island (Western Australia) 20°37′35″S 117°03′45″E

=== Canada ===
- Dixon Island (Kitikmeot Region), Nunavut
- Dixon Island (Qikiqtaaluk Region), Nunavut

== Dixson ==
- Dixson Island, Antarctica
