= Twin Islands Wildlife Sanctuary =

Wildlife sanctuary in Nunavut, Canada

- IUCN category IV (habitat/species management area)
- Interactive map of Twin Islands Wildlife Sanctuary
- Location: James Bay, Qikiqtaaluk, Nunavut, Canada
- Coordinates: 53°10′N 79°55′W
- Area: 142,500 ha (352,000 acres)
- Established: 1939

The Twin Islands Wildlife Sanctuary is a wildlife sanctuary in Qikiqtaaluk, Nunavut, Canada. It is located in the Twin Islands, including North Twin Island and South Twin Island, within central James Bay.

The wildlife sanctuary received its designation on 2 May 1939 and has an area of 142,500 hectares (35,200 acres). It is classified as Category IV by the International Union for Conservation of Nature.

== Other designations ==
The Twin Islands are also classified as a Canadian Important Bird Area; the IBA is within the wildlife sanctuary.

== Fauna ==
The sanctuary is an important habitat for polar bears, walruses, Canada geese, and semipalmated plovers.
