= Grey Goose =

Grey Goose may refer to:

- Grey Goose (vodka), a brand of vodka produced in France
- Grey goose, a bird

== Music ==
- Grey Goose (band), a band from Gainesville, Florida
- "Grey Goose" (song), a traditional American folk song, originally recorded by Lead Belly
- Grey Goose Music, a recording and music publishing company named after the folk song

== Business ==
- Grey Goose Bus Lines, a subsidiary of Greyhound Canada

== See also ==
- Grey Goose Island, an uninhabited arctic island in Nunavut, Canada
- Gray Goose Laws, a collection of laws from the Icelandic Commonwealth period
