= Moore Island (Hopewell Islands) =

Uninhabited island in the Qikiqtaaluk Region, Nunavut, Canada

- Location within Nunavut Location within Canada

Geography
- Location: Hudson Bay
- Coordinates: 58°34′N 78°32′W
- Archipelago: Arctic Archipelago

Administration
- Canada
- Territory: Nunavut
- Region: Qikiqtaaluk

Demographics
- Population: Uninhabited

Moore Island is an uninhabited island in Qikiqtaaluk Region, Nunavut, Canada. It is a member of the Hopewell Islands group in Hudson Bay. It lies in Hopewell Sound, about 28 km (17 mi) northwest of Inukjuak, Quebec, between McCormack Island and Hopkins Island. It measures about 4 km (2.5 mi) along its longest axis.
