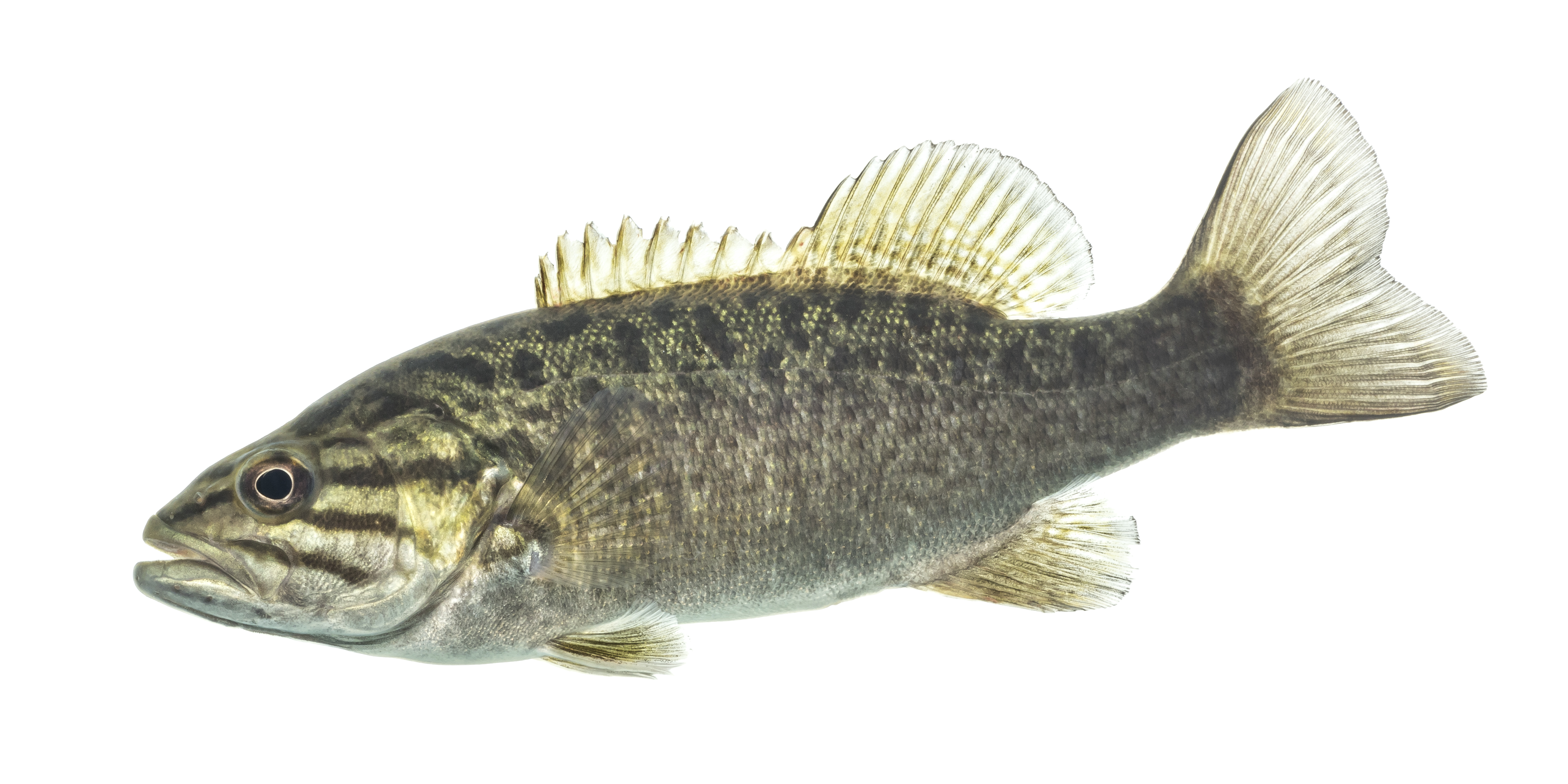

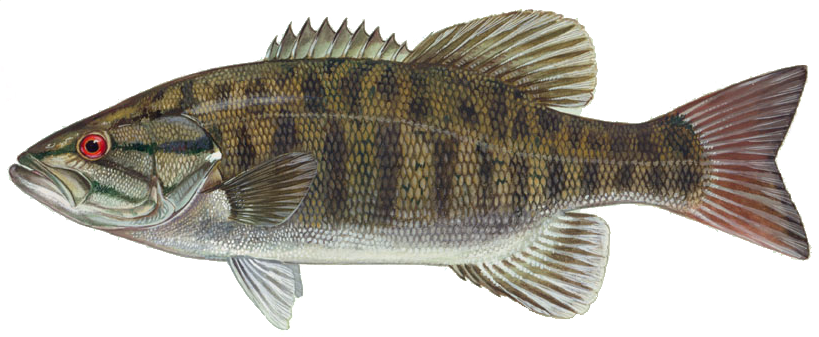

Conservation status
- Least Concern (IUCN 3.1)

- Secure (NatureServe)

Scientific classification
- Kingdom: Animalia
- Phylum: Chordata
- Class: Actinopterygii
- Division: Teleostei
- Order: Centrarchiformes
- Family: Centrarchidae
- Genus: Micropterus
- Species: M. dolomieu

Binomial name
- Micropterus dolomieu Lacépède, 1802

Synonyms
- Bodianus achigan Rafinesque, 1817; Cichla fasciata Lesueur, 1822; Centrarchus fasciatus (Lesueur, 1822); Cichla minima Lesueur, 1822

= Smallmouth bass =

Species of freshwater fish

The smallmouth bass (Micropterus dolomieu) is a species of freshwater fish in the sunfish family (Centrarchidae) of the order Centrarchiformes. It is the type species of its genus Micropterus (black basses), and is a popular game fish sought by anglers throughout the temperate zones of North America, and has been spread by stocking —as well as illegal introductions—to many cool-water tributaries and lakes in Canada and more so introduced in the United States. The maximum recorded size is approximately 27 inches (69 cm) and 12 pounds (5.4 kg).

The smallmouth bass is native to the upper and middle Mississippi River basin, the Saint Lawrence River–Great Lakes system, the Champlain Valley, and the Hudson Bay basin. Its common names include smallmouth, bronzeback, brown bass, brownie, smallie, bronze bass, and bareback bass.

== Description ==
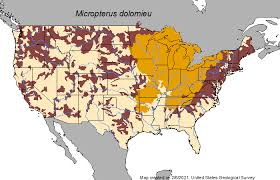
US distribution of smallmouth bass

Smallmouth have a slender but muscular fusiform body shape making them powerful swimmers. The coloration of the smallmouth bass's ctenoid scales range from golden-olive to dark brown dorsally which fades to a yellowish white ventrally with dark brown vertical bars or blotches along the body and dark brown horizontal bars on the head. The combination of the muscular fusiform body shape and camouflage like coloring make these fish highly effective ambush predators. The coloration can vary greatly depending on the fishes age, habitat, water quality, diet, and the spawning cycle.

Generally, the protruding jaw of the smallmouth does not extend back beyond the eyes which are red or brown. They have two dorsal fins which are separated by a shallow interdorsal notch. The front dorsal has 9–11 spiney rays and the back dorsal has 13–15 soft rays.

Males are generally smaller than females. The males tend to range around two pounds, while females can range from three to six pounds. Their average sizes and coloration can differ, depending on if they are found in lacustrine or riverine habitats. Smallmouth found in riverine habitats are generally long and slender which allows greater agility in moving water, while those found in lacustrine habitats and shorter and deeper bodied. Riverine smallmouth that live in dark water tend to be rather torpedo-shaped and very dark brown to be more efficient for feeding. Lacustrine smallmouth bass, however, that live in sandy areas, tend to be a light yellow-brown and are more oval-shaped.

There are two recognized subspecies, the Northern smallmouth bass (M. dolomieui dolomieui) and the Neosho smallmouth bass (M. dolomieui velox). The Northern smallmouth bass is much more widespread than the much smaller subgroup called the Neosho smallmouth bass. The Neosho are native to an ecologically isolated region of the lower Midwest known as the Central Interior Highlands, which weave through southwestern Missouri, northern Arkansas and northeastern Oklahoma.

They eat tadpoles, fish, aquatic insects, and crayfish.

The world record size is 11 pounds 15 ounces (5.41 kg) caught in the Dale Hollow reservoir, on the Kentucky–Tennessee border.

== Habitat ==
The smallmouth bass is found in clearer water than the largemouth, especially streams, rivers, and the rocky areas and stumps and also sandy bottoms of lakes and reservoirs. It can also survive in a stronger current than other black bass. The smallmouth prefers cooler water temperatures than its cousin the largemouth bass, and as a result will often seek out deeper, faster moving water during the hot summer months. Because it is intolerant of pollution, the smallmouth bass is a good natural indicator of a healthy environment, though they are still much more resilient than most trout species. Carnivorous, its diet comprises crayfish, amphibians, insects, and smaller fish, while the larvae feed on various zooplankton and insect larvae. Adults also cannibalize young of other parents.

The female can lay up to 21,100 eggs, which are guarded by the male in his nest.

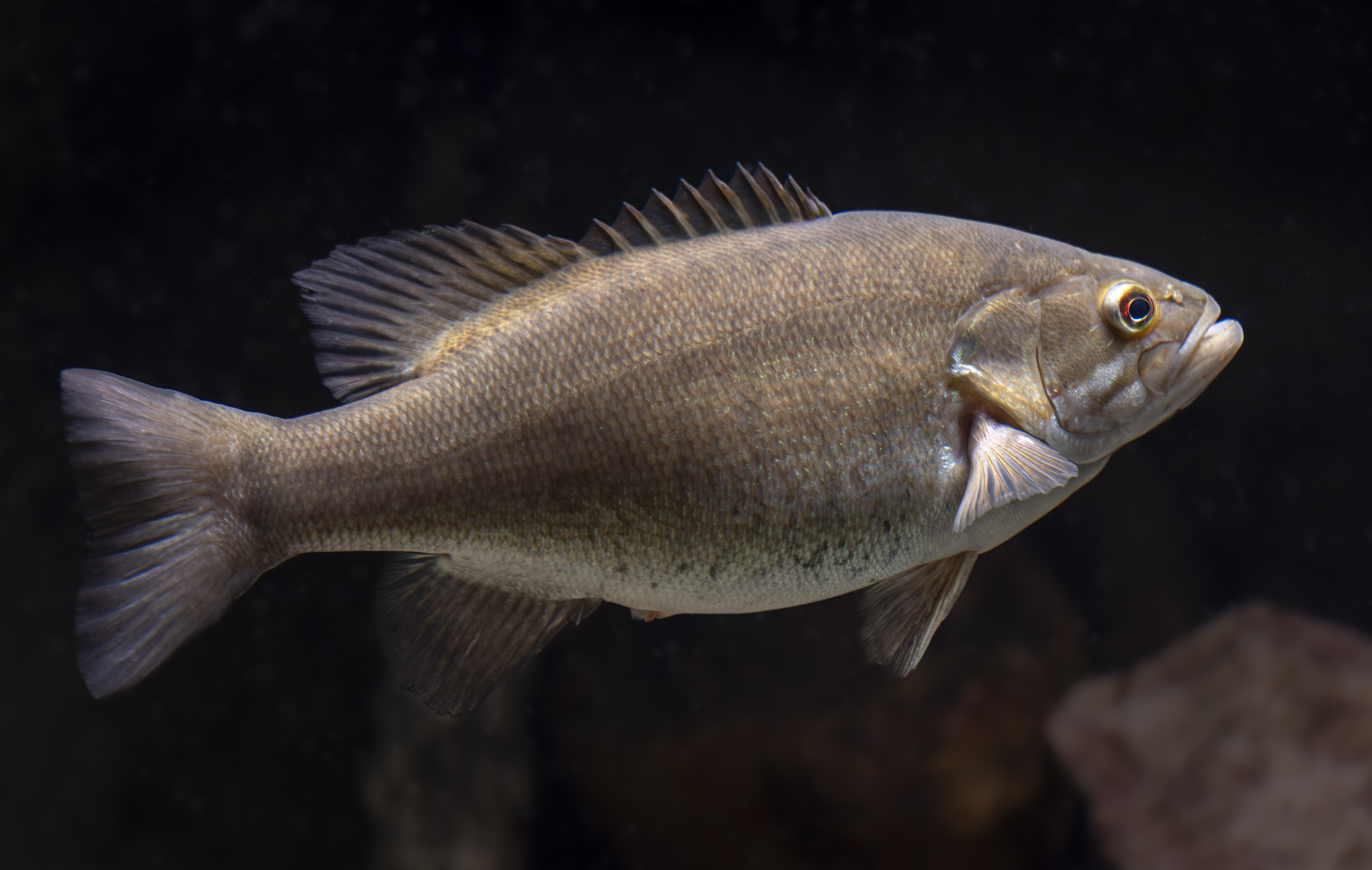
At Gavins Point National Fish Hatchery

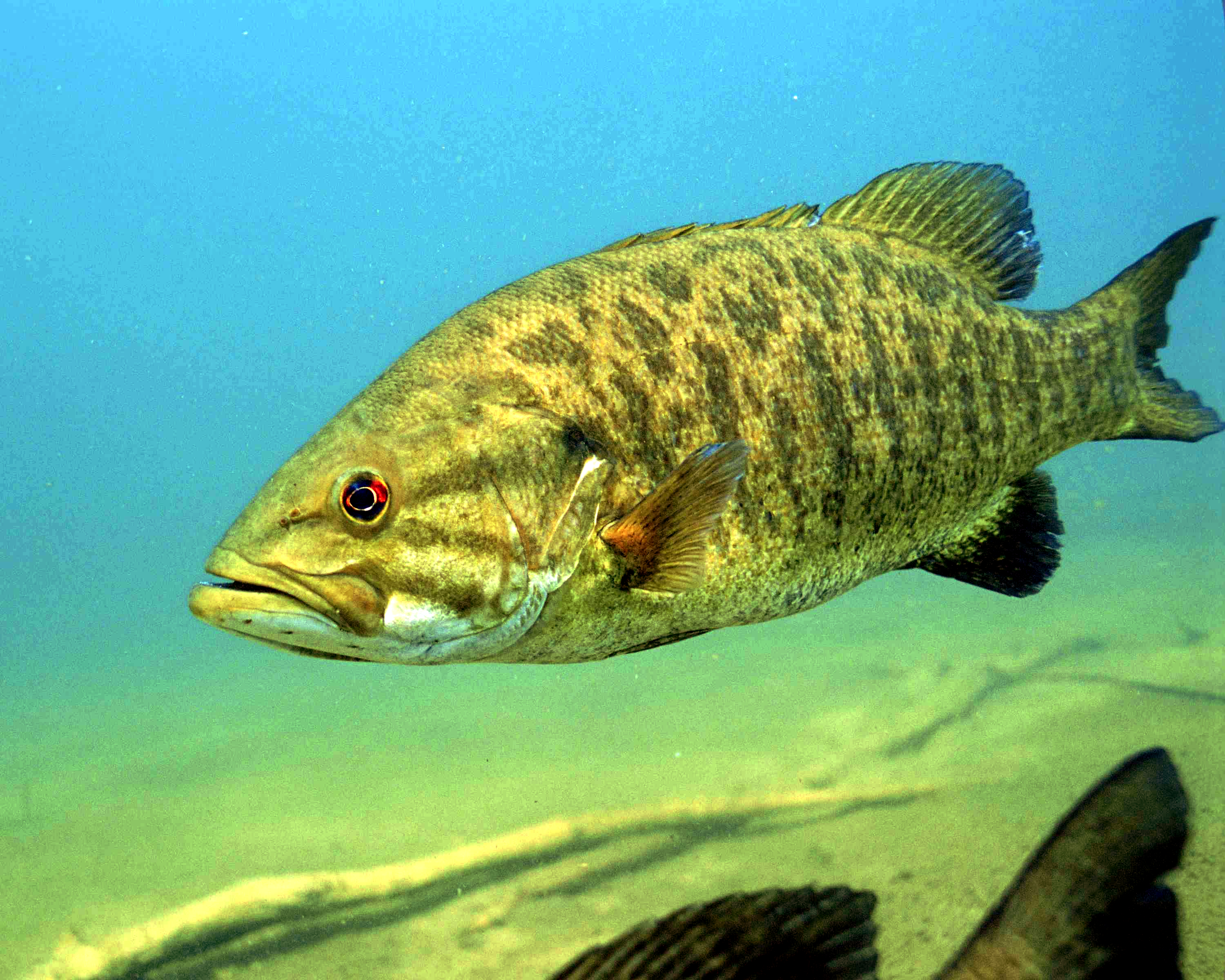
Smallmouth bass (Micropterus dolomieu)

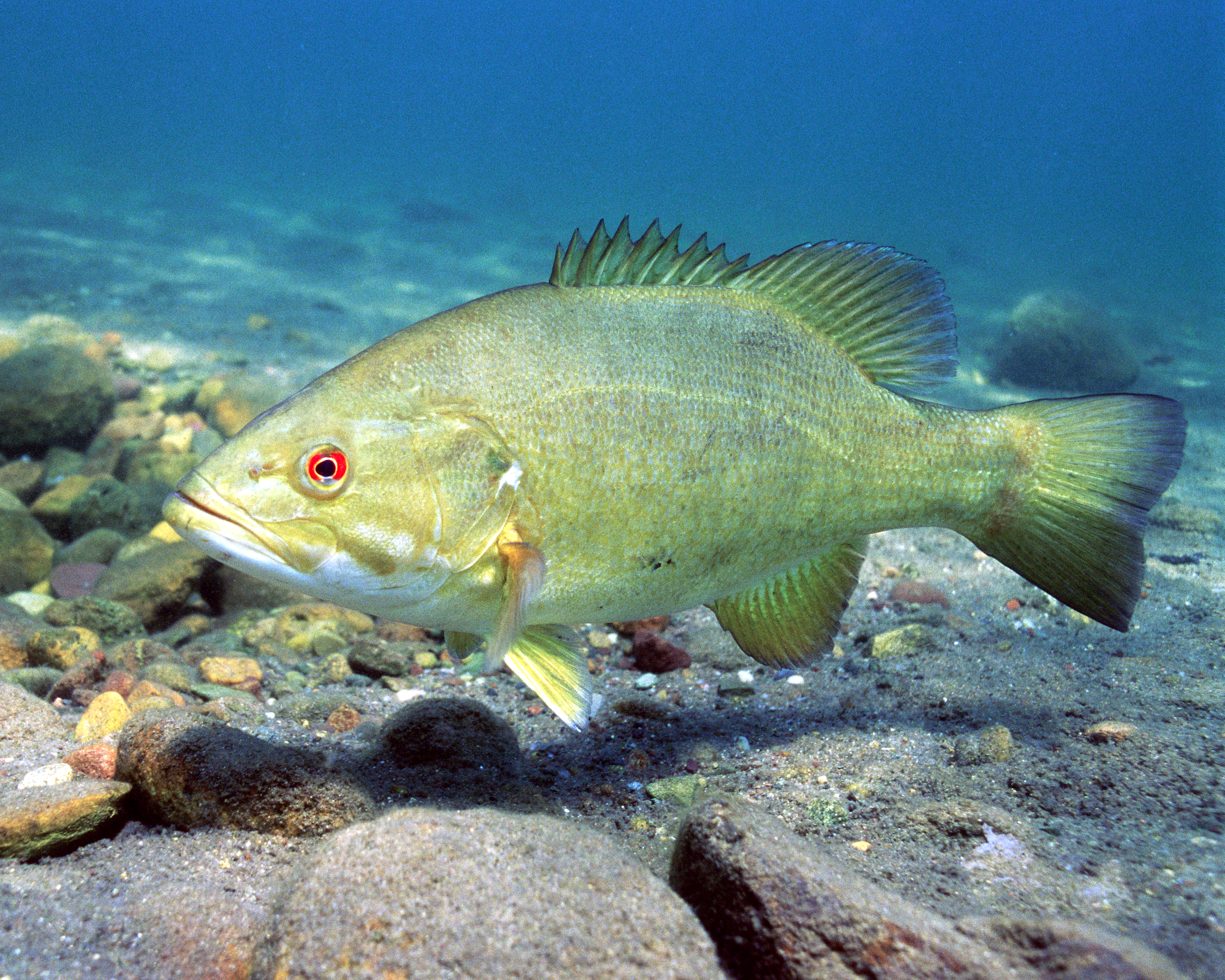
Lighter colored variety on sandy bottom habitat.

== Migration ==
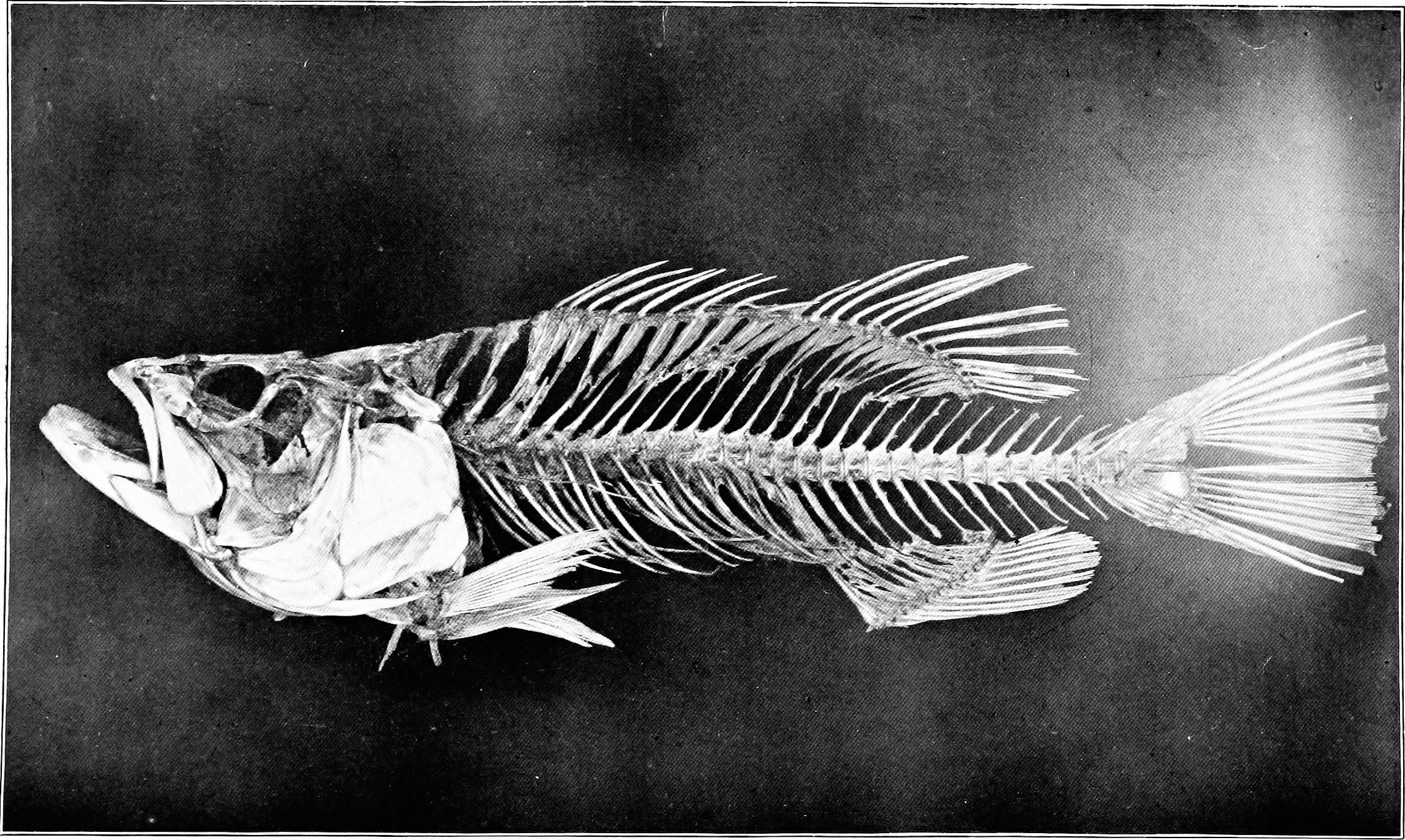
Smallmouth bass skeleton

When the weather gets colder, and the water temperature drops below 16 °C (60 °F), smallmouth will often migrate in search of deeper pools in which they enter a semi-hibernation state, moving sluggishly and feeding very little until the warm season returns. The migration patterns of smallmouth have been tracked and it is not unusual for a smallmouth to travel 12 miles in a single day in a stream, creek or river. The overall migration can exceed 60 miles.

Smallmouth generally begin spawning patterns in spring or early summer when water temperatures are between 15–18 °C (59.0–64.4 °F), which is heavily dependent on latitudinal location. Smallmouth require clean stone, rock, or gravel substrate for a successful spawn.

== Angling ==
In the United States, smallmouth bass were first introduced outside of their native range with the construction of the Erie Canal in 1825, extending the fish's range into central New York state. During the mid-to-late 19th century, smallmouth were transplanted via the nation's rail system to lakes and rivers throughout the northern and western United States, as far as California. Shippers found that smallmouth bass were a hardy species that could be transported in buckets or barrels by rail, sometimes using the spigots from the railroad water tanks to aerate the fingerlings. They were introduced east of the Appalachians just before the Civil War, and afterwards transplanted to the states of New England.

With increased industrialization and land use changes, many of the nation's eastern trout rivers were polluted or experienced elevated water temperatures, reducing the range of native brook trout. Smallmouth bass were often introduced to northern rivers with increased water temperatures and slowly became a popular gamefish with many anglers. Equally adaptable to large, cool-water impoundments and reservoirs, the smallmouth also spread far beyond its original native range. Later, smallmouth populations also began to decline after years of damage caused by overdevelopment and pollution, as well as a loss of river habitat caused by damming many formerly wild rivers to form lakes or reservoirs. Culling by boat electrofishing to suppress their population despite doubling their annual mortality resulted in a larger population of young and early-maturing fish.

In recent years, a renewed emphasis on preserving water quality and riparian habitat in the nation's rivers and lakes, together with stricter management practices, eventually benefited smallmouth populations and has caused a resurgence in their popularity with anglers.

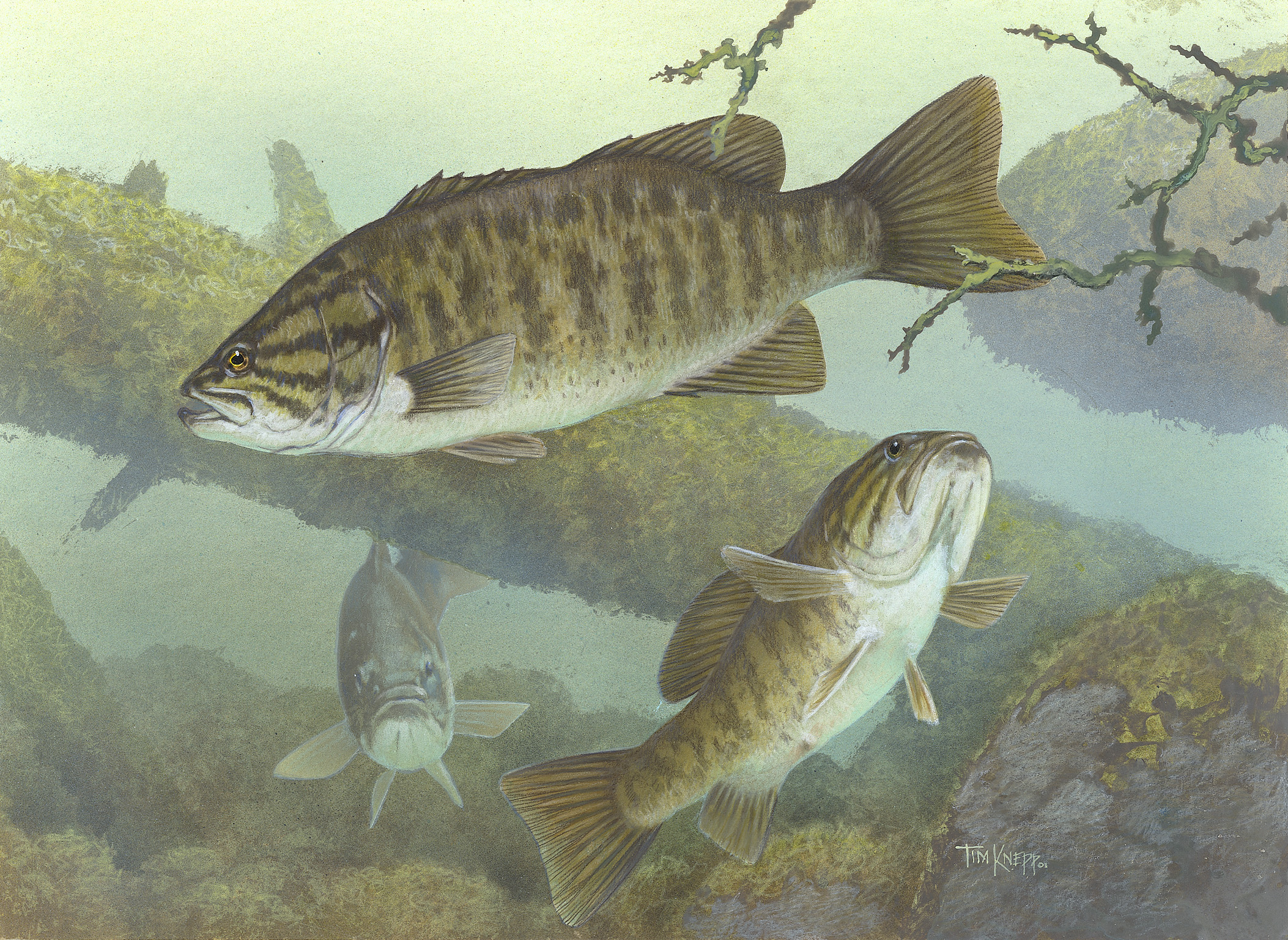
Illustration of a group of smallmouth bass

Today, smallmouth bass are very popular game fish, frequently sought by anglers using conventional spinning and bait casting gear, as well as fly fishing tackle. The smallmouth bass is potentially the toughest fighting freshwater fish in North America, and is commonly the targeted species in many fresh water fishing tournaments. In addition to wild populations, the smallmouth bass is stocked in cool rivers and lakes throughout Canada and the United States. In shallow streams, it is a wary fish, though usually not to the extent of most trout. The smallmouth is highly regarded for its topwater fighting ability when hooked – old fishing journals referred to the smallmouth bass as "ounce for ounce and pound for pound the gamest fish that swims". Smallmouth bass are not usually taken for the table, but rather are caught and released by most anglers. However, smaller specimens in cooler water often have higher quality filets of white, firm flesh when cooked.

The current all-tackle world record for a smallmouth bass is 11 lb 15 oz, caught by David Hayes in the Dale Hollow Reservoir, on the Kentucky/Tennessee border, in 1955.

=== Tackle ===
In conventional fishing, smallmouth may be successfully caught on a wide range of natural and artificial baits or lures, including crankbaits, hair jigs, plastic jerkbaits, artificial worms, spinnerbaits, and all types of soft plastic lures, including curly tail grubs or tubes with lead head jigs. Spinning reels or baitcasting reels may be used, with line strengths of 6 to 15 pounds typically utilized. According to many, smallmouth typically put up a better, more exciting fight than any other black bass. Rods are usually of ultralight to medium-heavy action. They may also be caught with a fly rod using a dry or wet artificial fly, nymphs, streamers, or imitations of larger aquatic creatures, such as hellgrammites, crawfish, or leeches. Floating topwater popper fly patterns and buzz baits are also popular for smallmouth fishing.

For river fishing, spinning tackle or fly tackle has been the most popular angling tools for smallmouth in North America for many years. When fishing in colder water, it is believed to be more effective to fish with smaller lures like hair jigs or small spinners. During the rest of the year, smallmouth are usually taken using soft plastic tubes or spinnerbaits. The best spots in rivers to fish for smallmouth are behind rocks or in eddies, where water swirls around. Smallmouth can also be taken in cool lakes like Lake Erie or any of the northern lakes.

At Eagle Lake in Ontario, Canada (Released)

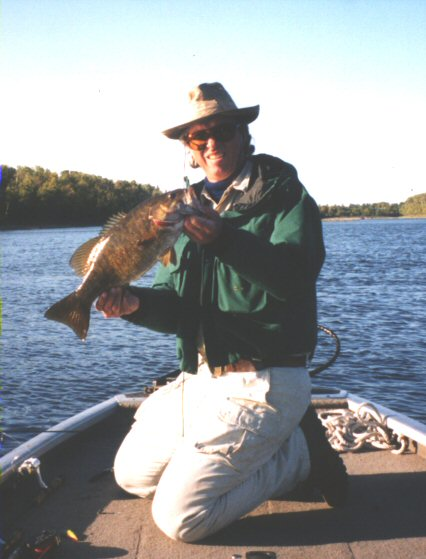
At Rainy River near International Falls, Minnesota (Released)
