= Stag Island =

Stag Island may refer to:

- Stag Island (Ontario), a private island in the St. Clair River in Ontario, Canada
- Stag Island (Nunavut), an uninhabited island in the southern part of James Bay of Nunavut, Canada
