= Kew Bay =

Bay in Nunavut, Canada

- Location within Nunavut
- Location: Penny Strait
- Coordinates: 76°38′N 98°22′W
- Ocean/sea sources: Arctic Ocean
- Basin countries: Canada
- Settlements: Uninhabited

Kew Bay is an Arctic waterway in the Qikiqtaaluk Region, Nunavut, Canada. It is located off northern Bathurst Island. It connects to Penny Strait to the east.
