= Weston Island =

Uninhabited island in Hudson Bay, Canada

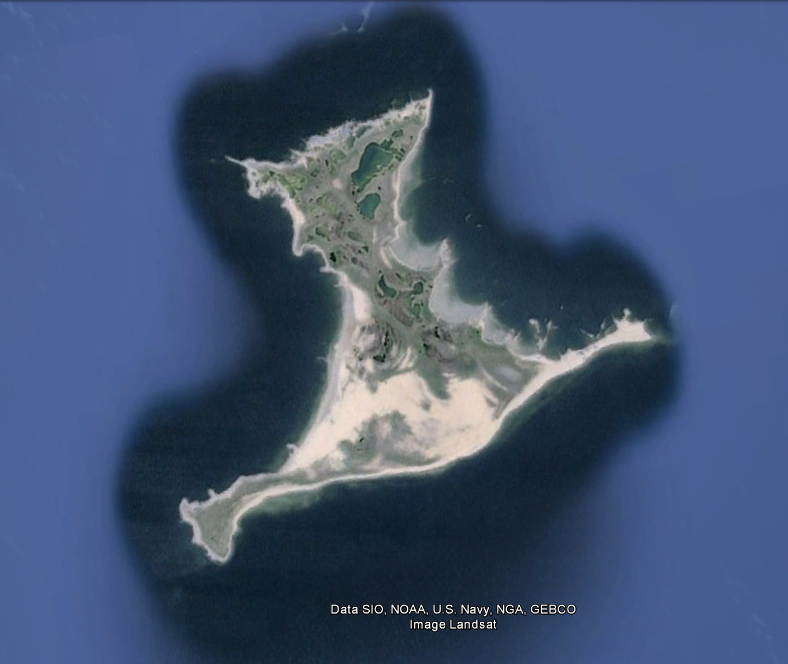
- Landsat view of Weston Island

- Location within Nunavut Location within Canada

Geography
- Location: James Bay
- Coordinates: 52°32′N 79°35′W
- Archipelago: Arctic Archipelago

Administration
- Canada
- Nunavut: Nunavut
- Region: Qikiqtaaluk

Demographics
- Population: Uninhabited

Weston Island is an uninhabited island in James Bay and is part of Qikiqtaaluk Region, Nunavut, Canada. It is lies between South Twin Island and Trodely Island.
