= Dixon Island (Kitikmeot Region) =

Island in Nunavut, Canada

- Location within Nunavut Location within Canada
- Interactive map of Dixon Island

Geography
- Location: Northern Canada
- Coordinates: 71°40′N 96°52′W
- Archipelago: Arctic Archipelago

Administration
- Canada
- Territory: Nunavut
- Region: Kitikmeot

Demographics
- Population: Uninhabited

Dixon Island is an island of the Arctic Archipelago, located in the Kitikmeot Region of Nunavut. It lies in Franklin Strait, south of Hobday Island and the much larger Prince of Wales Island.
