= Stupart Island =

Canadian arctic islands in Nunavut

- Location within Nunavut Location within Canada

Geography
- Location: Arctic Ocean
- Coordinates: 77°08′00″N 104°25′30″W
- Archipelago: Findlay Group; Queen Elizabeth Islands; Arctic Archipelago

Administration
- Canada
- Territory: Nunavut
- Region: Qikiqtaaluk

Demographics
- Population: Uninhabited

Stupart Island is one of the uninhabited Canadian arctic islands in Nunavut, Canada. It lies in the Arctic Ocean, south-east of Lougheed Island and west of Edmund Walker Island. It is part of the Findlay Group.
