= Sheets Island =

Protected natural area archipelago in the Susquehanna River in Pennsylvania, USA

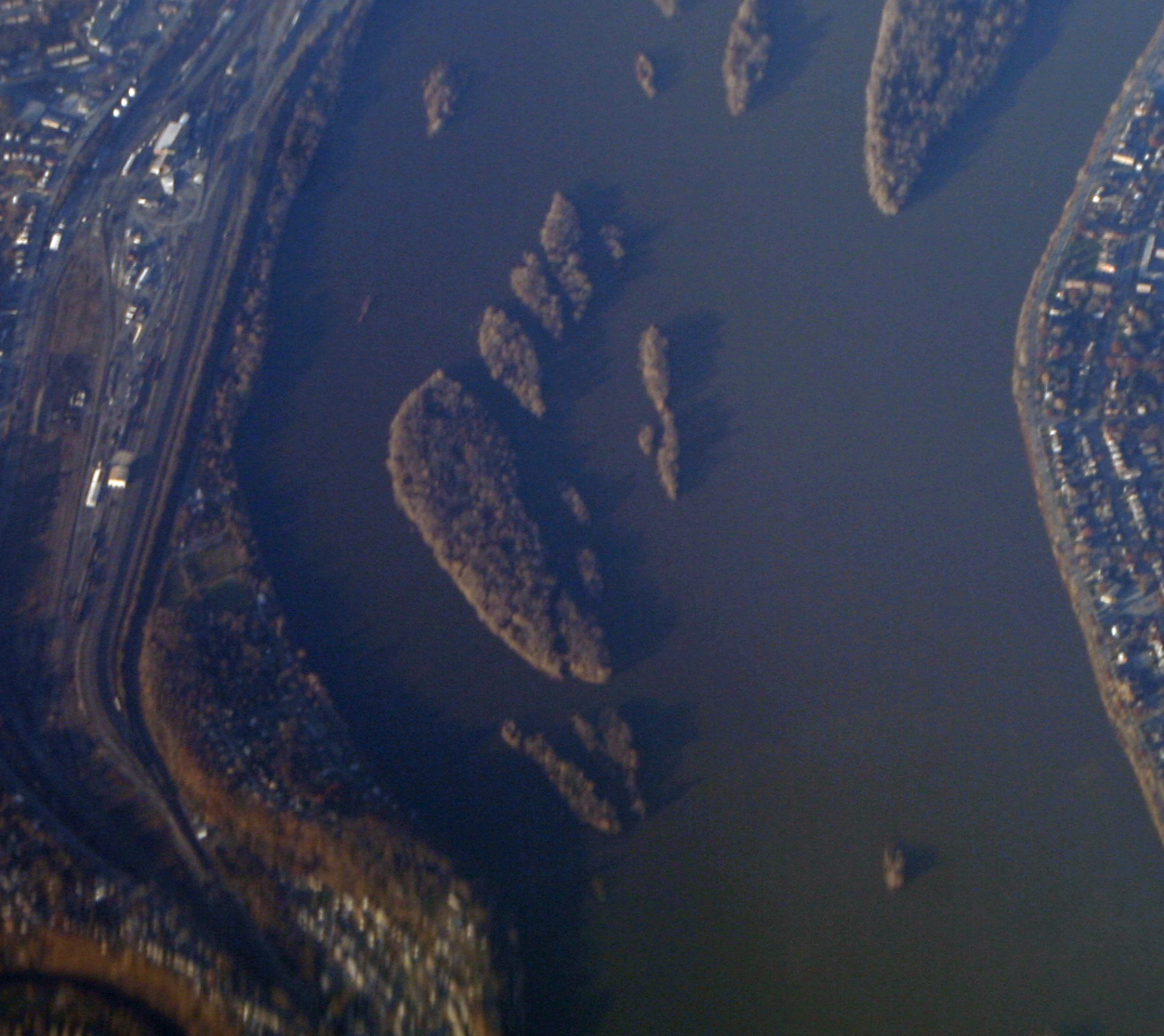
- Sheets Island at center, within its archipelago in the Susquehanna River.
- Location of Sheets Island within Pennsylvania
- Location within Pennsylvania

Geography
- Location: Susquehanna River
- Coordinates: 40°17′19″N 76°55′05″W
- Archipelago: Sheets Island Archipelago
- Area: 70 acres (28 ha)
- Highest elevation: 312 ft (95.1 m)

Administration
- United States
- State: Pennsylvania
- County: Dauphin
- City: Harrisburg

Sheets Island (sometimes also referred to as Shutts Island) is an island and archipelago located in the Susquehanna River beside the city of Harrisburg, Pennsylvania. It has much smaller surrounding islands, all of which comprise the protected Sheets Island Archipelago Natural Area (70 acres). This land is open to the public and considered a Natural Area by the Pennsylvania Department of Conservation and Natural Resources, within the Weiser State Forest District. Other major nearby islands in the river outside of the archipelago are McCormick Island, Independence Island, and Governor’s Island.
