= Hyde Parker Island =

Island in Nunavut, Canada

- Location within Nunavut Location within Canada

Geography
- Location: Northern Canada
- Coordinates: 76°29′N 097°08′W
- Archipelago: Queen Elizabeth Islands; Arctic Archipelago

Administration
- Canada
- Territory: Nunavut

Demographics
- Population: Uninhabited

Hyde Parker Island is a member of the Queen Elizabeth Islands and the Arctic Archipelago in the territory of Nunavut. It is an irregularly shaped island located in the Penny Strait, between Bathurst Island and Devon Island. John Barrow Island lies directly to the north, while Sir John Barrow Monument is to the east.
