= Eagle-Dogtooth Provincial Park =

Park in Ontario, Canada

- IUCN category II (national park)
- Location within Ontario
- Location: Kenora District, Ontario, Canada
- Nearest town: Kenora
- Coordinates: 49°44′56″N 93°43′16″W
- Area: 41,128 ha (158.80 sq mi)
- Designation: Waterway
- Established: 2003
- Governing body: Ontario Parks
- Website: www.ontarioparks.com/park/eagledogtooth

Eagle-Dogtooth Provincial Park is a provincial park in Kenora District, Ontario, Canada. It protects a series of lakes and streams between Eagle Lake in the east and Dogtooth Lake in the west. With its irregular terrain of land and water, the park has high fishing, tourism and recreational values.

Eagle-Dogtooth Provincial Park is a non-operating park. The only facilities are 25 backcountry campsites and 3 boat launches, but numerous commercial outfitters and lodges provide services to anglers and hunters in the park. Permitted activities include boating, canoeing, camping, hiking, biking, fishing, and hunting, while snowmobiling and dogsledding are permitted in the winter. There are several documented canoe routes through the park, ranging in duration from 2 to 14 days.

== Geography ==
The streams and lakes are part of the Winnipeg River basin and the English River subbasin. Some of the larger lakes within the park include:

- Dogtooth Lake
- Eagle Lake (West Arm, western shore, and around Muskeg Bay)
- Ethelma Lake
- Fisher Lake
- Hawkcliff Lake
- Highwind Lake
- Hillock Lake
- Kilvert Lake
- Manomin Lake
- Populus Lake
- Porcus Lake
- Robinson Lake
- Taggau Lake
- Winnange Lake (partially, remainder in Winnange Lake Provincial Park)

Its landscape is a transition between the Great Lakes-St. Lawrence and boreal forest regions, with regionally significant moraines, wetlands, and pine forest ecosystems. The vegetation is characterized by deciduous, mixed, and conifer forests. Due to large forest fires in 1974 and 1980, there is sparse vegetated bedrock with stands of jack pine, birch, and aspen. There are also some patches of white and red pine that are over 100 years old, as well as cedar, black ash, white spruce, and balsam fir.

A portion of the Experimental Lakes Area, a controlled area for conducting scientific experiments in lakes, is included in the park. Experimental Lakes # 109, 421, 625, and 938 are fully within the park, while Lakes # 110, 262, 309, and 428 have only portions or shorelines within the park.

Rushing River Provincial Park is directly to the west and acts as a gateway to Eagle-Dogtooth. Winnange Lake Provincial Park, roughly midway between Dogtooth and Eagle Lakes, is partially surrounded by Eagle-Dogtooth Provincial Park. The Dryberry Lake Conservation Reserve is just to the south, and Blue Lake Provincial Park is about 8 kilometres (5.0 mi) to the north of Eagle-Dogtooth Provincial Park.

== Fauna ==
Animals found in the park include beaver, black bear, fisher, lynx, mink, moose, muskrat, American marten, red fox, river otter, snowshoe hare, timber wolf, and white-tailed deer, with occasional sightings of cougar. Waterfowl species include Canada goose, common loon, mallard, and common merganser.

Among the native fish species present are lake trout, northern pike, walleye, and yellow perch.
