= Patterson Island (Findlay Group) =

Island in Nunavut, Canada

- Location within Nunavut Location within Canada

Geography
- Location: Arctic Ocean
- Coordinates: 77°03′N 103°41′W
- Archipelago: Findlay Group; Queen Elizabeth Islands; Arctic Archipelago

Administration
- Canada
- Territory: Nunavut
- Region: Qikiqtaaluk

Demographics
- Population: Uninhabited

Patterson Island is one of the uninhabited Canadian arctic islands in Nunavut, Canada. It lies in the Arctic Ocean, south-east of Grosvenor Island. It is the most southerly island of the Findlay Group.

Another Patterson Island lies in Ungava Bay, part of the Hopewell Islands, just across from Inukjuak. The Algerine Channel separates it from Harrison Island. It has roughly the same area as the first one but is much more elongated in shape.
