= Sheets Island Archipelago Natural Area =

Natural area in Pennsylvania

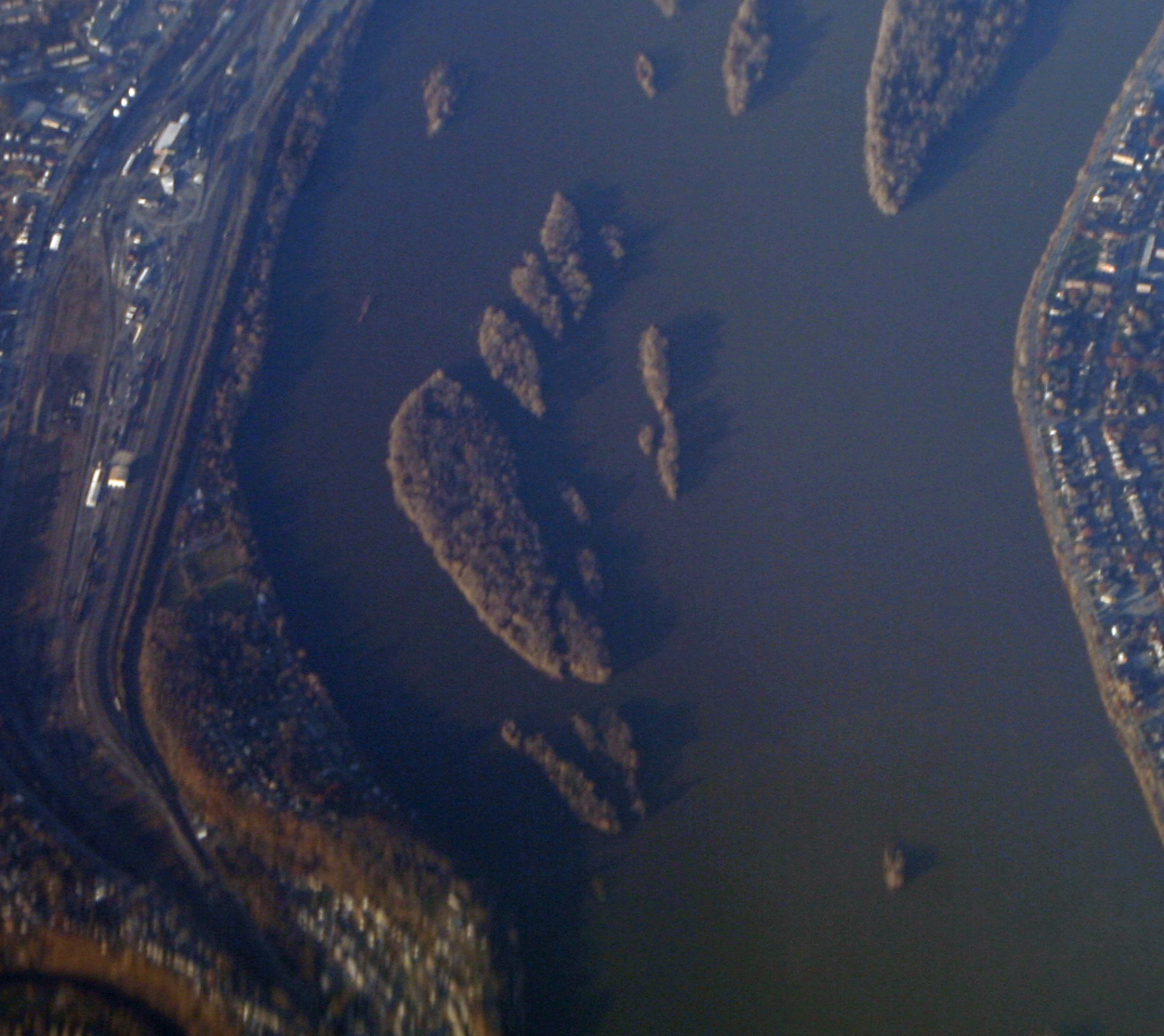
- The archipelago in the Susquehanna River; Sheets Island is the large island in the center.

- Location within Pennsylvania
- Location: Dauphin County, Pennsylvania
- Nearest town: Enola
- Coordinates: 40°17′18″N 76°55′04″W
- Area: 70 acres (28 ha)

Sheets Island Archipelago Natural Area is a 70-acre (28 ha) protected area in Dauphin County, Pennsylvania, United States. It is part of Weiser State Forest.

== Description ==
The Natural Area was established to protect Sheets Island and about four dozen smaller nearby islands in the Susquehanna River between Enola and Harrisburg. The archipelago has been noted as a birding location where many species of resident and migratory waterfowl and songbirds can be found, including cormorants and egrets which are uncommon in Pennsylvania. The area has also been noted for its unique car-free outdoor experiences in the midst of a developed metropolitan area. The natural area can only be reached by boat.
