= Findlay Group =

Group of islands in the Arctic Archipelago

- Location within Nunavut Location within Canada

Geography
- Location: Arctic Ocean
- Coordinates: 77°24′N 104°46′W
- Archipelago: Queen Elizabeth Islands; Arctic Archipelago
- Total islands: 5
- Major islands: Lougheed Island
- Area: 1,409 km^{2} (544 sq mi)
- Coastline: 278 km (172.7 mi)

Administration
- Canada
- Nunavut: Nunavut
- Region: Qikiqtaaluk

Demographics
- Population: Uninhabited

The Findlay Group is a group of islands in the Arctic Archipelago in Qikiqtaaluk Region, Nunavut. This Arctic Ocean group consists of Lougheed Island,^{A} Stupart Island,^{B} Edmund Walker Island,^{C} Grosvenor Island^{D} and Patterson Island.^{E}

== Mapping ==
A.Lougheed Island, 77°24′N 105°15′W
B.Stupart Island, 77°08′N 104°25′W
C.Edmund Walker Island, 77°07′N 104°10′W
D.Grosvenor Island, 77°05′N 103°52′W
E.Patterson Island, 77°03′N 103°41′W
