= Cape Pollock =

Cape Pollock (68°3′S 146°50′E) is the northern point of Dixson Island, located at the west side of the mouth of Ninnis Glacier. Discovered by the Australasian Antarctic Expedition (1911–1914) under Douglas Mawson, who named it for Professor J.A. Pollock of the Expedition Advisory Committee.
