= Wade Island =

Island in Pennsylvania, United States

Coordinates: 40.3°N 76.9136°W

Wade Island is located in the Susquehanna River in Harrisburg, Pennsylvania. Itself a part of the Sheets Island archipelago, the small island is home to Pennsylvania's large nesting colony of herons and egrets.

== 2002 survey ==
In May 2002, the annual survey of the waterbird colony on Wade Island in the Susquehanna River near Harrisburg was conducted. It is Pennsylvania's sole population of nesting great egrets, which is why this species is listed as endangered. Some 142 egret nests were found, a 14 percent decrease from 2001. Wade Island is also home to the largest black-crowned night heron rookery in the state. Over the past decade this species suffered a general decline. On a positive note, 107 nests were found, 14 more than in 2001. Surveyors noted a dramatic increase, a near doubling, of cormorant nests from 11 to 21, a 91 percent increase. The most dramatic finding resulted from an assessment of the perimeter of the island taken by Pennsylvania Game Commission biologist Cal Butchkoski. Comparison to a 1987 map revealed severe erosion on the east side of the island resulting in a loss of one third of its area over 15 years.

== See also ==
- McCormick Island
