= Hobday Island =

Island in Nunavut, Canada

- Location within Nunavut Location within Canada

Geography
- Location: Northern Canada
- Coordinates: 71°44′N 96°56′W
- Archipelago: Canadian Arctic Archipelago

Administration
- Canada
- Territory: Nunavut

Demographics
- Population: Uninhabited

Hobday Island is an island of the Canadian Arctic Archipelago, in the territory of Nunavut. It lies in the Franklin Strait, between Prince of Wales Island (to the north and west) and Dixon Island (to the south-east).
