= Browne Island =

Island in Nunavut, Canada

- Location within Nunavut Location within Canada

Geography
- Location: Northern Canada
- Coordinates: 74°49′N 096°22′W
- Archipelago: Queen Elizabeth Islands; Arctic Archipelago
- Area: 5 km^{2} (1.9 sq mi)

Administration
- Canada
- Territory: Nunavut

Demographics
- Population: Uninhabited

Browne Island lies within the Arctic Archipelago in the Qikiqtaaluk Region of northern Canada's territory of Nunavut. It is one of the Parry Channel islands off the southwest coast of Cornwallis Island. Kittiwakes and seals are known to breed on the island.
