= Walter Island =

Island in Nunavut, Canada

Walter
- Location within Nunavut Location within Canada

Geography
- Location: James Bay
- Coordinates: 53°19′N 79°40′W
- Archipelago: Arctic Archipelago
- Area: 3 km^{2} (1.2 sq mi)
- Highest elevation: 3 m (10 ft)

Administration
- Canada
- Nunavut: Nunavut
- Region: Qikiqtaaluk

Demographics
- Population: Uninhabited (2026)
- Pop. density: 0/km^{2} (0/sq mi)

Walter Island is one of several uninhabited Canadian arctic islands in Nunavut, Canada located within James Bay. It is 3 km^{2} (1.2 sq mi) in size, and is situated 15 km (9.3 mi) east of North Twin Island.

The island takes part in surveys for polar bear summer refuge.
