= Cayo Espanto =

Island off the coast of Belize

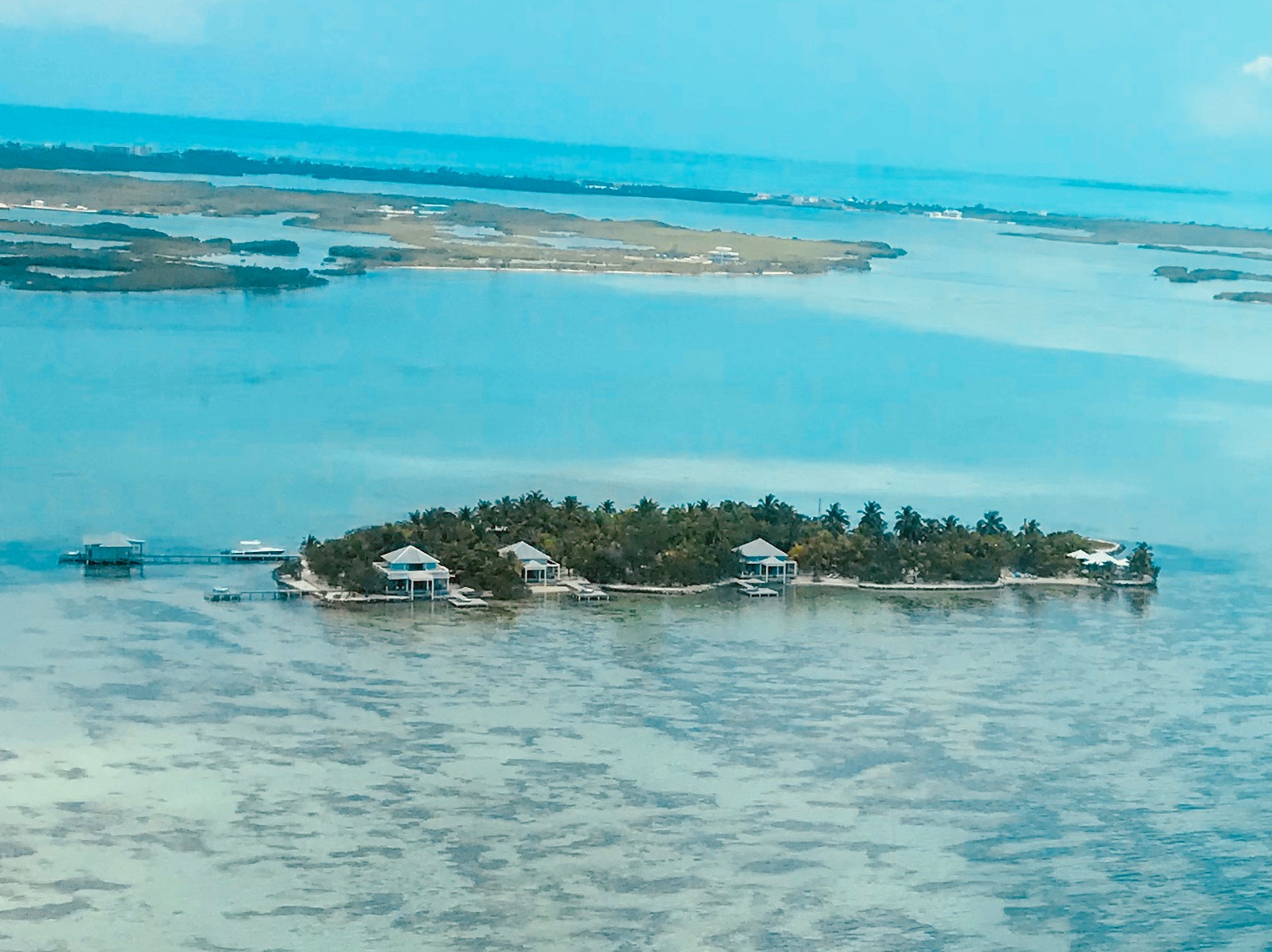
- Cayo Espanto in 2018

- Location within Belize
- Etymology: "Cursed Island" (Spanish)

Geography
- Location: Belize
- Coordinates: 17°56′50″N 88°7′21″W
- Archipelago: Pinkerton Islands
- Adjacent to: Caribbean Sea
- Area: 1.2 ha (3.0 acres)
- Length: 360 m (1180 ft)
- Width: 520 m (1710 ft)

Administration
- Belize
- District: Belize District

Demographics
- Population: 0
- Languages: English

Cayo Espanto is an island off the coast of Belize in the Caribbean Sea. It is one of the approximately 450 islands of the Belize Barrier Reef. Administratively it is part of the Belize District. It is private property.

Until 1997 the island had no name and formed the archipelago of Pinkerton Islands together with two adjacent, tiny islands. In 1997 the island was bought by US-American estate agent Jeff Gram. In December 1998 Gram opened up a resort with seven villas for paying guests. The resort features a helipad, a spa, a gym, and a PADI diving base. Various celebrities have been visiting the island in the past, among them Leonardo DiCaprio, who bought nearby Blackadore Caye together with Jeff Gram in order to put up another resort there. In 2022 it was listed among the "20 Best Adults-Only All-Inclusive Resorts in the World" by Reader's Digest magazine.
