= Dixon Island (Qikiqtaaluk Region) =

Island in Nunavut, Canada

- Location within Nunavut Location within Canada
- Interactive map of Dixon Island

Geography
- Location: Northern Canada
- Coordinates: 51°45′25″N 79°6′0″W
- Archipelago: Arctic Archipelago

Administration
- Canada
- Territory: Nunavut
- Region: Qikiqtaaluk

Demographics
- Population: Uninhabited

Dixon Island is an island of the Arctic Archipelago, located in the Qikiqtaaluk Region of Nunavut. It lies where Rupert Bay meets James Bay.
