= Nookap Island =

Island in Nunavut, Canada

Native name: Nukappiannguaq
- Location within Nunavut Location within Canada

Geography
- Location: Northern Canada
- Coordinates: 75°35′N 087°37′W
- Archipelago: Queen Elizabeth Islands; Arctic Archipelago

Administration
- Canada
- Territory: Nunavut
- Region: Qikiqtaaluk Region

Demographics
- Population: Uninhabited

Nookap Island is a small, irregularly shaped island located in Jones Sound, southeast of Skruis Point, Devon Island, in the territory of Nunavut. It is a member of the Queen Elizabeth Islands and the Arctic Archipelago. Nookap Island is named after Nookapingwa, Inuk guide father of Arnakitsoq Simigaq.
