= Bear Islands =

Islands in Nunavut, Canada

- Location within Nunavut Location within Canada

Geography
- Location: Northern Canada
- Coordinates: 54°22′N 081°05′W

Administration
- Canada
- Nunavut: Nunavut
- Region: Qikiqtaaluk

Demographics
- Population: Uninhabited

The uninhabited Bear Islands are located in James Bay, southeast of the Belcher Islands. They are part of the Qikiqtaaluk Region, in the Canadian territory of Nunavut and consists of black basalt outcrops. They are made up of the Bear Island and Two Cubs Islands. Nearby is Sunday Island.

From 1957 to 1965, Bear Island was a radar site on the Mid-Canada Line and also housed a petroleum depot and small airfield. After being abandoned, it lay derelict. In 1996 it was identified for remediation, and this work was completed during the summer of 2010 at a cost of $5.5 million.
