= McCormick Island =

Island in Pennsylvania, United States

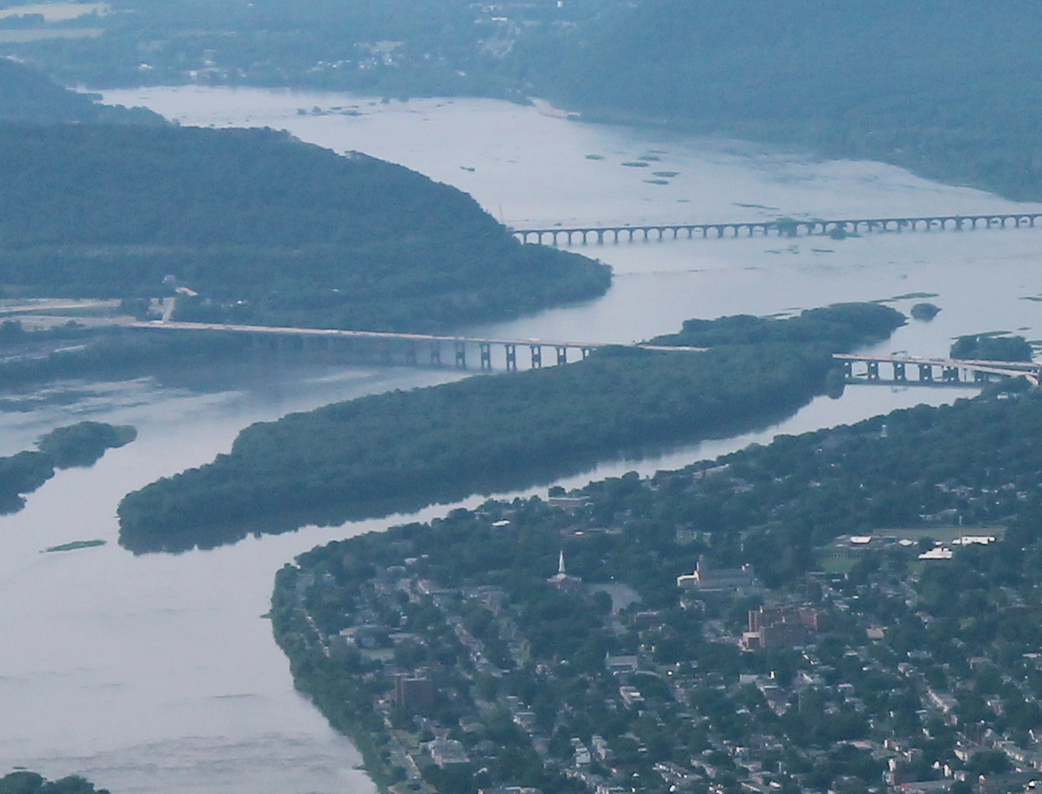
- Aerial image looking North at McCormick Island, 2016

- Location within Pennsylvania

Geography
- Location: Susquehanna River
- Coordinates: 40°18′27″N 76°54′26″W
- Highest elevation: 315 ft (96 m)

Administration
- United States
- State: Pennsylvania
- County: Dauphin
- City: Harrisburg

McCormick Island is a 100-acre (0.40 km^{2}) island, located in the city of Harrisburg, Pennsylvania. It's one of the larger islands that makes up the Sheets Island Archipelago (3,675 acres) in the Susquehanna River. Other islands surrounding are Sheets Island, and Governor’s Mansion Island. It is directly south of the I-81 bridge, and can be seen from many different places in Harrisburg. It also is relatively close to Wade Island, another popular stopover for birds in migration. Wade Island is protected and access is not permitted. The various shorebirds present on McCormick Island represent an attraction for bird enthusiasts. Wade Island Rookery, Pennsylvania's largest multi-species nesting island, is also a great attraction.

== History ==
Like most of the Susquehanna River islands, McCormick is made up of layered flood deposits laid down over many years. Paleoindians used this island as a seasonal encampment nearly 8,000 years ago. As floods occurred, many of the previous remains of the Indians became buried. Thus McCormick Island is layered with many different artifacts of previous societies. Stone tools have been recovered, cooking hearths, ceramics, beads, and metal objects. Possible post and pole objects have also been discovered. McCormick Island now contains a large, protected Native American archaeological site.

== Ownership ==
McCormick Island, named after the family of Mayor Vance McCormick, originally owned the island and donated it to the City of Harrisburg. In the 1920s and 1930s, it was busy with visitors farming, swimming, canoeing, and adventuring up until the Flood of 1936. On August 15, 2007, the Central Pennsylvania Conservancy (CPC) purchased McCormick Island from the City of Harrisburg for a total cost in excess of $125,000. The main goal was to preserve the vital asset for birds close to being endangered, as well as protecting other habitats. McCormick remains open to the public with walking trails and places for picnicking and camping. River recreation activities such as fishing, boating, canoeing and jet skiing are permitted. Strict rules apply to trash and disposal to help reduce the pollution on the island.

== Animals ==
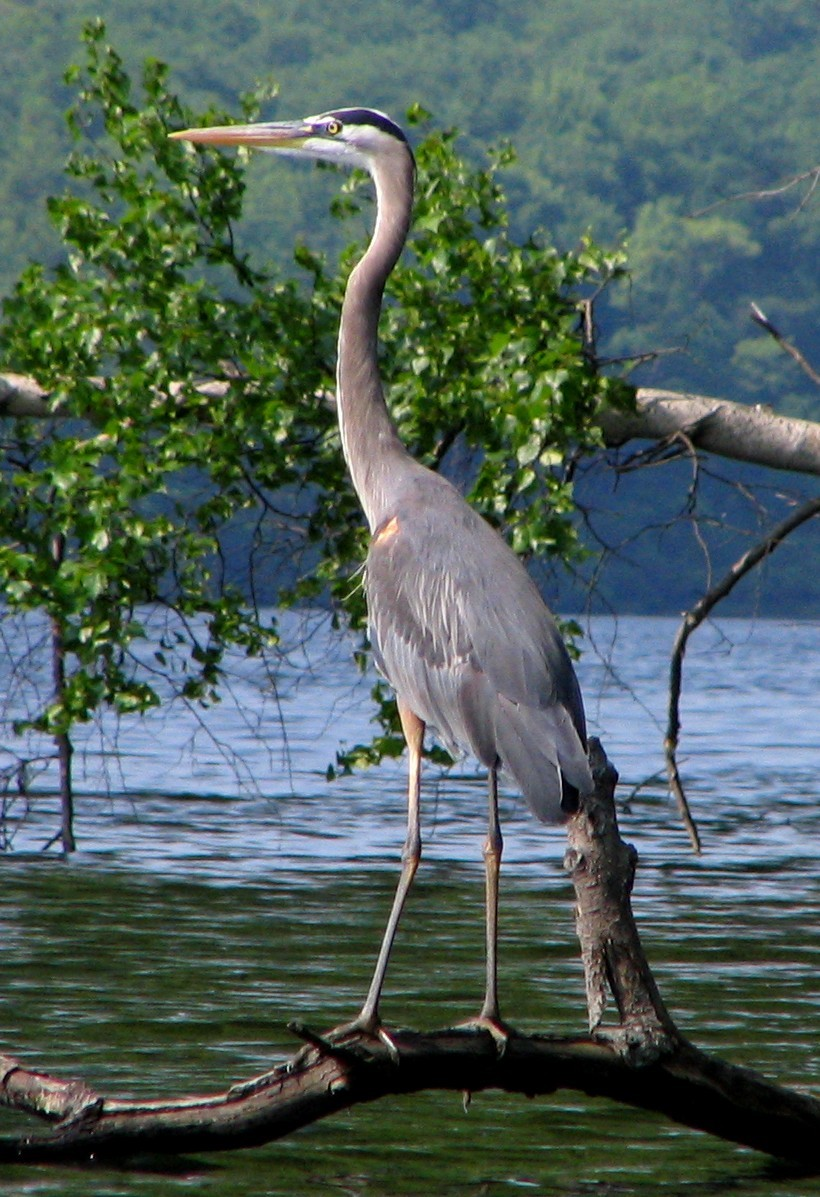
Great blue heron

McCormick Island regularly supports thousands of waterfowl during the migratory season, such as the common loon, horned grebe, red-breasted merganser, lesser scaup, and bufflehead. McCormick Island also represents the highest concentration of wading birds in Pennsylvania during the breeding season including the great egret, yellow-crowned night-heron and black-crowned night-heron. The island also provides important breeding habitat for the black-crowned night-heron, which is classified as a candidate- at risk species in Pennsylvania and under consideration for Pennsylvania endangered species status. Thus McCormick Island is declared an Important Bird Area (IBA) by The National Audubon Society. Any disturbance on the island could possibly impact the bird habitat. McCormick Island provides a great avian habitat because of the forested wetland complex and shallow foraging areas, and open water. Typically, the main birds spotted on McCormick Island are: great blue heron, green back heron, black-crown night heron, egrets, and bald eagles. Non avian species documented on the island include river otter, beaver, muskrat, snapping turtle, yellow-bellied slider turtle, map turtle and water snake. American toad populations are abundant on the islands. George Miksch Sutton frequented the island in the late 1950s to view and study the black-crowned night-heron.

== Plants ==
McCormick Island and surrounding islands are primarily deciduous forest and dominated by river birch, sycamore, silver maple, tulip poplar and poison ivy. Several plant species of Pennsylvania concern inhabit the island including aster-like boltonia, flat-leaved pondweed, umbrella magnolia, blue-eyed grass, and umbrella flatsedge.

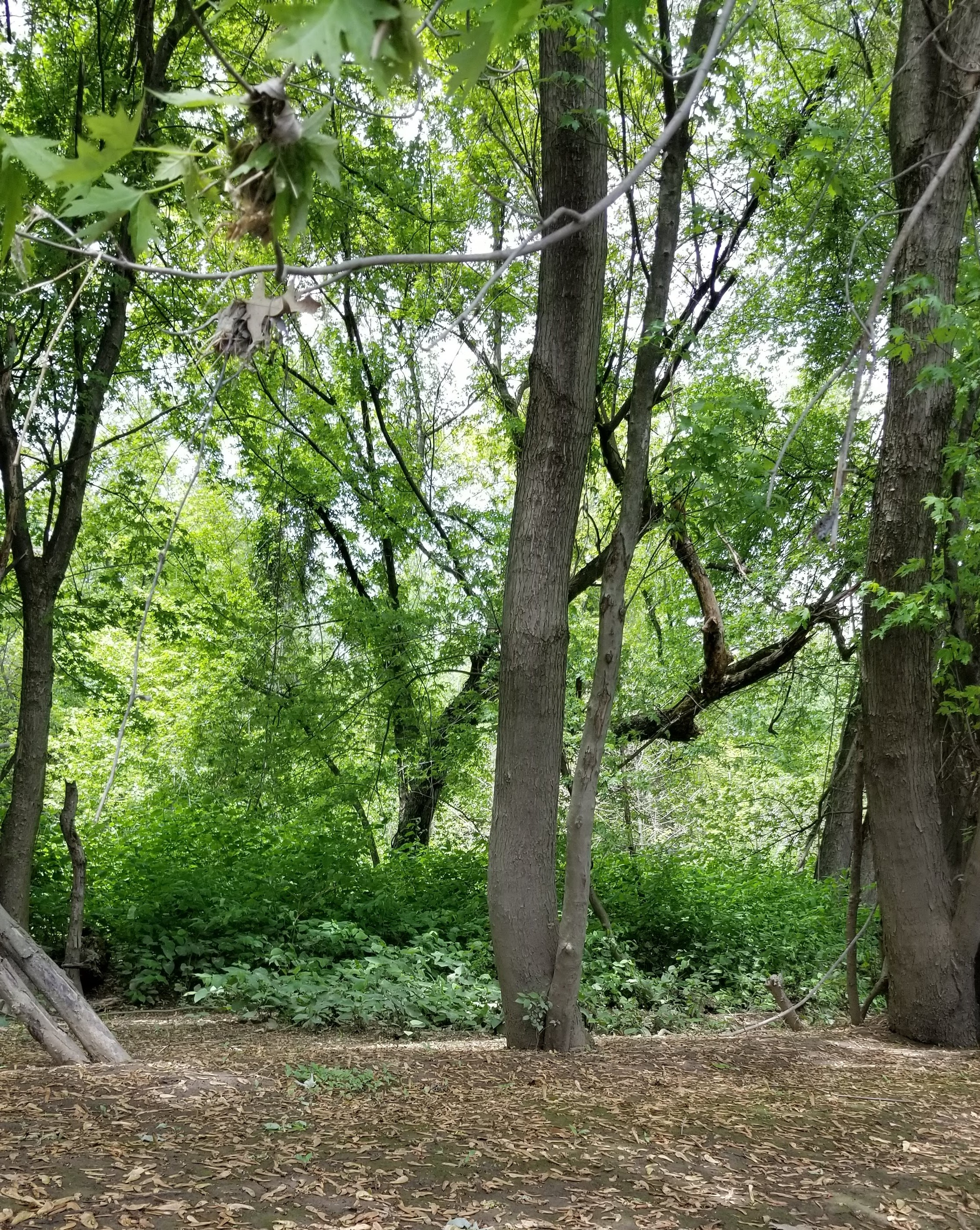
Trees and other vegetation on McCormick Island, Harrisburg, PA.

== See also ==
- Heron
- Wade Island
- Important Bird Area
- The National Audubon Society
- Susquehanna River
