= Spencer Island =

Island in Nunavut, Canada

- Location within Nunavut Location within Canada

Geography
- Location: Northern Canada
- Coordinates: 53°30′22″N 79°42′43″W
- Archipelago: Arctic Archipelago

Administration
- Canada
- Nunavut: Nunavut
- Region: Qikiqtaaluk

Demographics
- Population: Uninhabited

Spencer Island is one of several uninhabited Canadian arctic islands in Nunavut, Canada located within James Bay. It is situated 19 km (19,000 m) northwest from North Twin Island. During surveys in James Bay, polar bears were sighted using the island for summer refuge.
