= Blackadore Caye =

Island in Belize

Coordinates: 18°01′N 88°01′W

Location of Blackadore Caye

Blackadore Caye is a small island in Belize, west of Ambergris Caye, in the Caribbean Sea, not far from the Belize Barrier Reef.

In 2005, Leonardo DiCaprio purchased Blackadore Caye, which is approximately 104 acres, for a reported $1.75 million. DiCaprio had originally discovered the island on a vacation in 2004 while staying at the ultra-luxury resort Cayo Espanto. DiCaprio purchased Blackadore Caye with Cayo Espanto owner Jeff Gram.

DiCaprio's plan for the island involves the restorative development of an eco-resort. The vision of the project is to increase the biological health of species on the island and surrounding waters while serving as a luxury eco-resort to island guests. Sustainability goals include the resort being powered completely by renewable energy.
