= Dixson Island =

Island in Antarctica

- Location within Antarctica

Geography
- Location: Antarctica
- Coordinates: 68°8′S 146°43′E

Administration
- Administered under the Antarctic Treaty System

Demographics
- Population: Uninhabited

Dixson Island is a high ice-covered island, 19 km (10 nmi) long and 9 km (5 nmi) wide, at the west side of the mouth of Ninnis Glacier. It was discovered by the Australasian Antarctic Expedition (1911–14) under Douglas Mawson, who named it for Sir Hugh Dixson of Sydney, a patron of the expedition.

The northern point of Dixson Island is Cape Pollock.

== See also ==
- List of Antarctic and sub-Antarctic islands
