= Moore Island (Boat Passage) =

Uninhabited island in the Qikiqtaaluk Region, Nunavut, Canada

- Location within Nunavut Location within Canada

Geography
- Location: James Bay
- Coordinates: 51°42′52″N 79°00′25″W
- Archipelago: Arctic Archipelago

Administration
- Canada
- Territory: Nunavut
- Region: Qikiqtaaluk

Demographics
- Population: Uninhabited

Moore Island is an uninhabited island in the Qikiqtaaluk Region, Nunavut, Canada. It lies in Boat Passage, on the northern side of Rupert Bay, an extension of Hudson Bay. It measures about 300 m (980 ft) along its longest axis. Jacob Island lies to the west and Waskaganish is about 31 km (19 mi) southeast.
