= McCormack Island =

Island in Nunavut, Canada

- Location within Nunavut Location within Canada

Geography
- Location: Hudson Bay
- Coordinates: 58°35′13″N 78°36′6″W
- Archipelago: Arctic Archipelago

Administration
- Canada
- Territory: Nunavut
- Region: Qikiqtaaluk

Demographics
- Population: Uninhabited

McCormack Island is a northern Canadian island in eastern Hudson Bay. While situated close to the western coast of Quebec's Ungava Peninsula, the island is a part of Qikiqtaaluk Region in the territory of Nunavut.
