= Carey Island (Nunavut) =

Island in Canada

- Location within Nunavut Location within Canada

Geography
- Location: James Bay
- Coordinates: 52°19′N 79°02′W
- Archipelago: Arctic Archipelago

Administration
- Canada
- Nunavut: Nunavut
- Region: Qikiqtaaluk

Demographics
- Population: Uninhabited
- Ethnic groups: Cree

Carey Island (variant: Cary Island) is one of several uninhabited Canadian arctic islands located within the midsection of James Bay in Nunavut, Canada. It is situated south of Vieux-Comptoir (Old Factory).

Boatswain Bay Migratory Bird Sanctuary is nearby.
