= Spit Island =

Island in Nunavut, Canada

Spit (Kate) Island
- Location within Nunavut Location within Canada

Geography
- Location: Northern Canada
- Coordinates: 76°50′N 097°07′W
- Archipelago: Queen Elizabeth Islands; Arctic Archipelago

Administration
- Canada
- Territory: Nunavut

Demographics
- Population: Uninhabited

Spit Island (also known as Kate Island) is an island of the Arctic Archipelago, in the territory of Nunavut. It lies in the Penny Strait, west of Devon Island.
