= Edmund Walker Island =

Island in Nunavut, Canada

- Location within Nunavut Location within Canada

Geography
- Location: Arctic Ocean
- Coordinates: 77°07′N 104°10′W
- Archipelago: Findlay Group; Queen Elizabeth Islands; Arctic Archipelago
- Area: 82 km^{2} (32 sq mi)

Administration
- Canada
- Nunavut: Nunavut
- Region: Qikiqtaaluk

Demographics
- Population: Uninhabited

Edmund Walker Island is one of the Canadian arctic islands in Nunavut, Canada. It lies in the Arctic Ocean, south-east of Lougheed Island and north-west of Grosvenor Island. It is part of the Findlay Group.
