= Twin Islands (Nunavut) =

Islands in Nunavut, Canada

Coordinates: 53°10′N 79°55′W

Geography
- Location: Northern Canada
- Archipelago: Arctic Archipelago
- Total islands: 2
- Major islands: North Twin Island and South Twin Island
- Area: 301 km^{2} (116 sq mi)
- Highest elevation: 60 m (200 ft)

Administration
- Canada
- Nunavut: Nunavut
- Region: Qikiqtaaluk

Demographics
- Population: Uninhabited
- Ethnic groups: Cree

The Twin Islands (Cree language: Mah-Nah-Woo-Na-N) are similarly shaped Arctic islands in the Qikiqtaaluk Region of Nunavut, Canada. They are located in central James Bay, 56 km (35 mi) north east of Akimiski Island, and 58 km (36 mi) west of Quebec. The group includes North Twin and South Twin islands.

== Geography ==
Approximately 11 km (6.8 mi) separate the two islands. North Twin Island, 157 km^{2} (61 sq mi), 18.5 km (11.5 mi) by 11 km (6.8 mi), to the northwest, is the larger of the two. South Twin Island measures 12.8 km (8.0 mi) by 10.2 km (6.3 mi). Landscape characteristics include, unconsolidated sand, gravel, lakes, marshland, sand dunes, and wide tidal flats.

Notable landmarks include Cotter Point on North Twin, and Lucy Point on South Twin.

== Flora ==
The habitat includes small stands of trees: dwarf birch, juniper, white spruce, and willows, along with heaths and shrubs.

== Conservation ==
The Twin Islands are a Canadian Important Bird Area (#NU034), an International Biological Program site (Site 6–2), and a Key Terrestrial Migratory Bird Site (NU Site 56). The Twin Islands Wildlife Sanctuary is part of the James Bay Preserve.

== Avifauna ==
Notable bird species include: American pipit, Arctic tern, Canada goose, dunlin, eastern white-crowned sparrow, horned lark, Lapland longspur, least sandpiper, purple sandpiper, red-necked phalarope, Savannah sparrow, semipalmated plover, semipalmated sandpiper, waterfowl, and willow ptarmigan.

Polar bears frequent the area.
