= Grosvenor Island =

Island in Nunavut, Canada

- Location within Nunavut Location within Canada

Geography
- Location: Arctic Ocean
- Coordinates: 77°05′N 103°52′W
- Archipelago: Findlay Group; Queen Elizabeth Islands; Arctic Archipelago

Administration
- Canada
- Territory: Nunavut
- Region: Qikiqtaaluk

Demographics
- Population: Uninhabited

Grosvenor Island is one of the Canadian arctic islands in Nunavut, Canada. It lies in the Arctic Ocean, south-east of Edmund Walker Island and north-west of Patterson Island. It is part of the Findlay Group.
