= Weiser State Forest =

State forest in Pennsylvania, United States

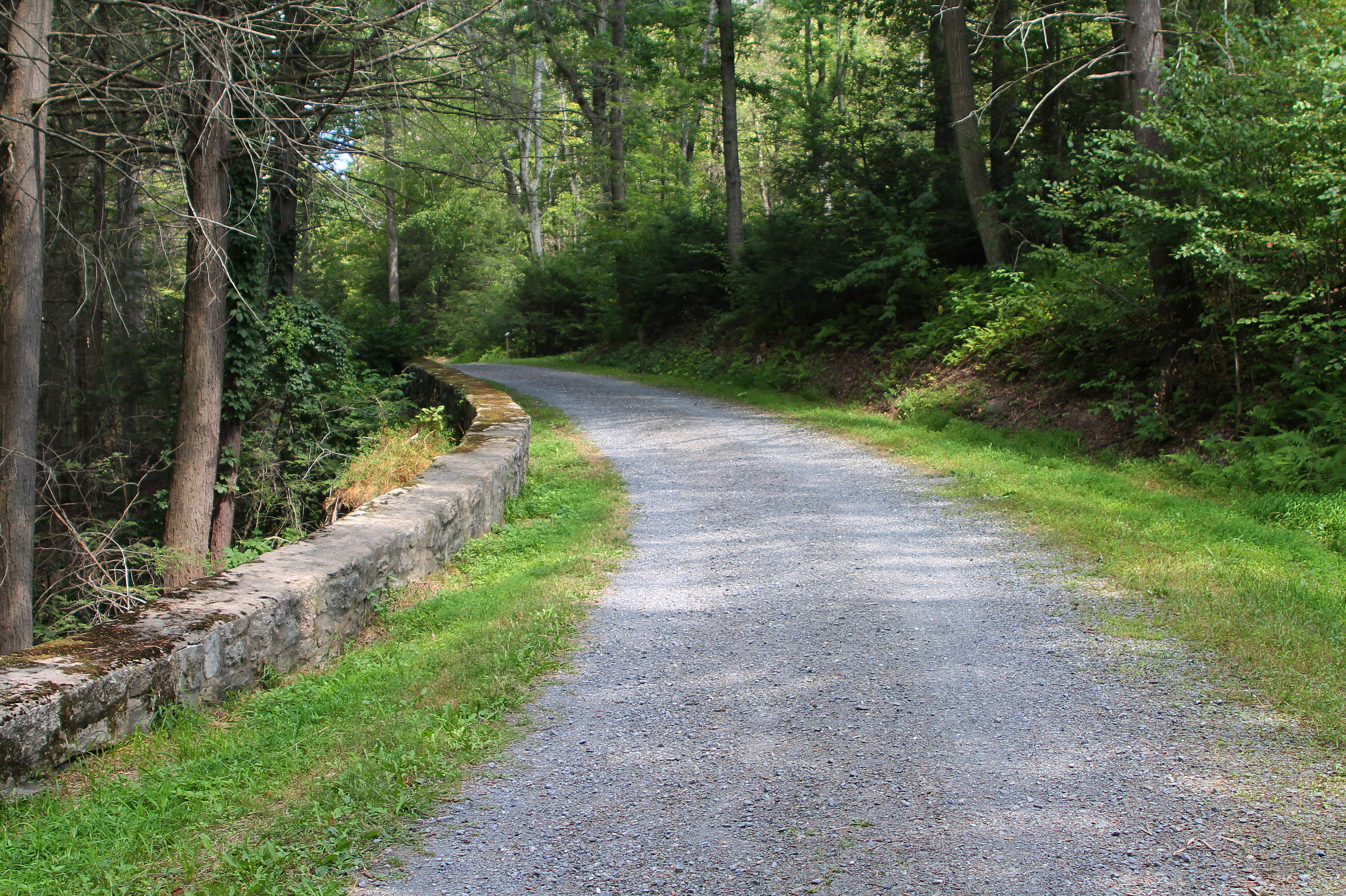
- Roaring Creek Trail in the Roaring Creek Tract

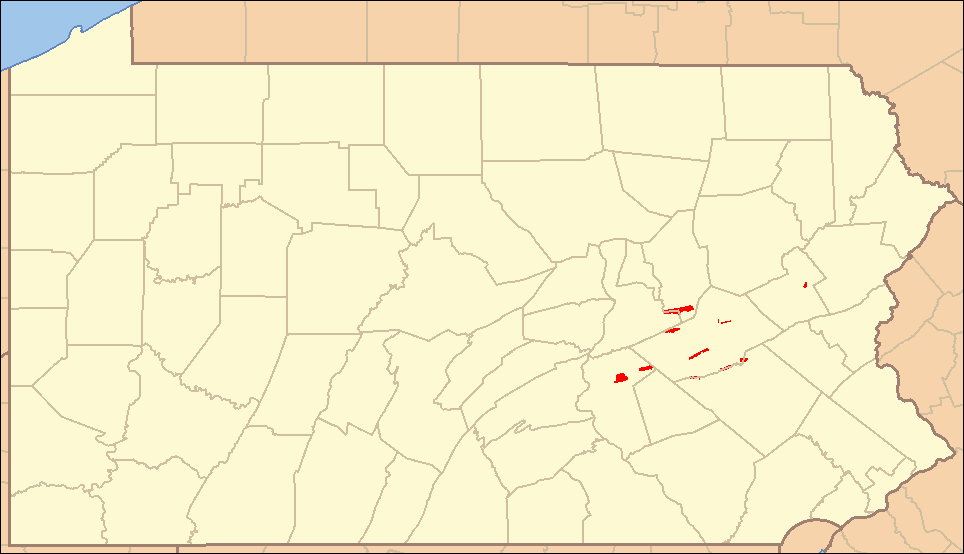
- Location of Weiser State Forest in Pennsylvania
- Location: Pennsylvania, United States
- Coordinates: 40°37′49″N 76°11′35″W
- Area: 17,961 acres (72.69 km^{2})
- Governing body: Pennsylvania Department of Conservation and Natural Resources
- Website: Weiser State Forest

Weiser State Forest is a Pennsylvania State Forest in Pennsylvania Bureau of Forestry District #18. The main offices are located in Cressona in Schuylkill County, Pennsylvania in the United States.

The forest is located on several small tracts in Carbon, Columbia, Dauphin, Northumberland, and Schuylkill counties. District #18 also includes Lebanon and Montour counties. The state forest officially expanded into Luzerne County in November 2021. The Appalachian Trail runs through the state forest lands.

== History ==
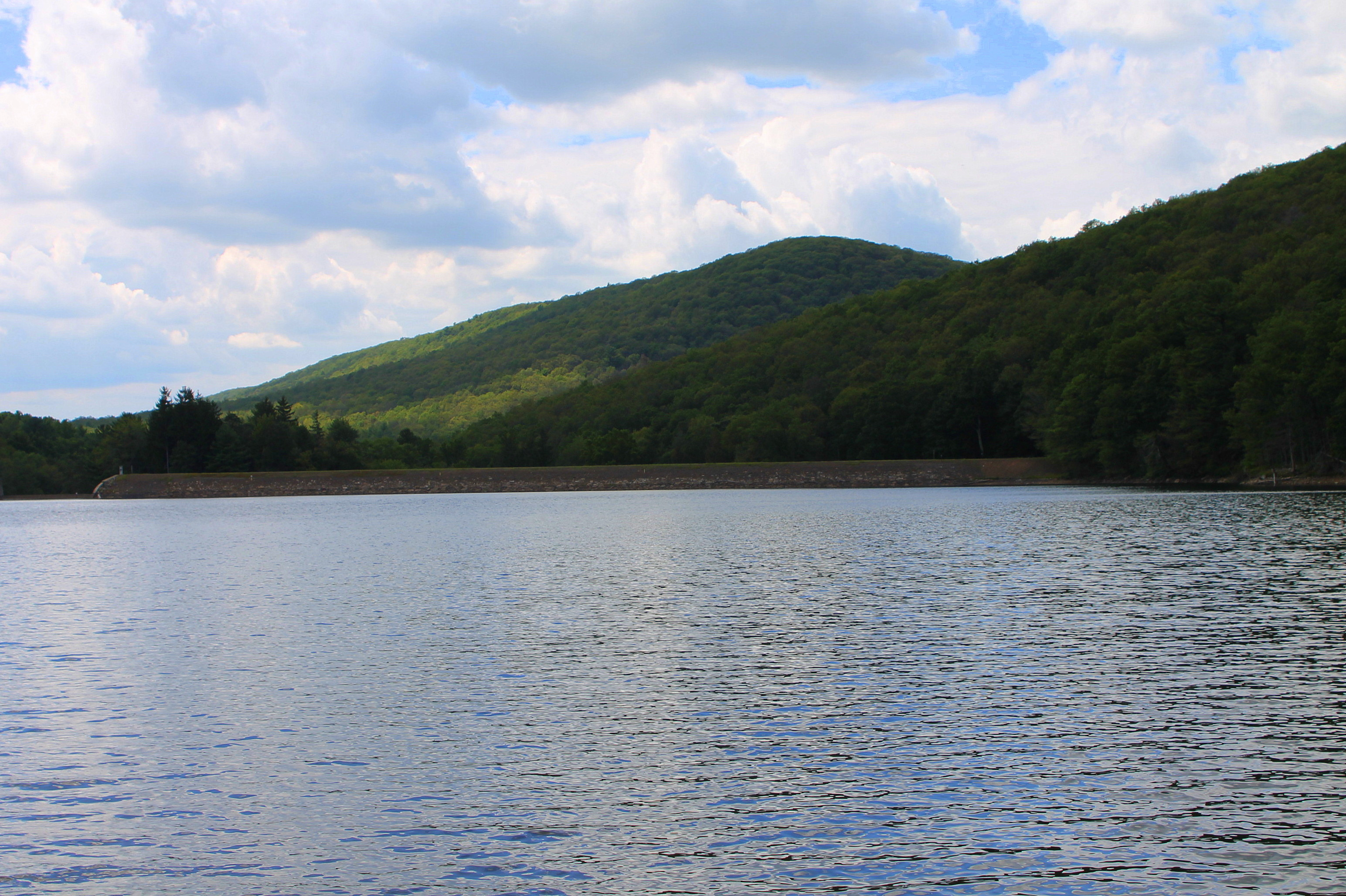
Shamokin Reservoir in Weiser State Forest

Weiser State Forest was formed as a direct result of the depletion of the forests of Pennsylvania that took place during the mid-to-late 19th century. Conservationists like Dr. Joseph Rothrock became concerned that the forests would not regrow if they were not managed properly. Lumber and iron companies had harvested the old-growth forests for various reasons. They clear cut the forests and left behind nothing but dried tree tops and rotting stumps. The sparks of passing steam locomotives ignited wildfires that prevented the formation of second growth forests. The conservationists feared that the forest would never regrow if there was not a change in the philosophy of forest management. They called for the state to purchase land from the lumber and iron companies and the lumber and iron companies were more than willing to sell their land since that had depleted the natural resources of the forests. The changes began to take place in 1895 when Dr. Rothrock was appointed the first commissioner of the Pennsylvania Department of Forests and Waters, the forerunner of today's Pennsylvania Department of Conservation and Natural Resources. The Pennsylvania General Assembly passed a piece of legislation in 1897 that authorized the purchase of "unseated lands for forest reservations." This was the beginning of the State Forest system.

Conrad Weiser

The forest is named for Conrad Weiser, an important Pennsylvanian in colonial days, especially known as an interpreter and emissary in councils between Native Americans and Pennsylvania.

Prior to the July 1, 2005 realignment of Pennsylvania State Forest Districts, Weiser State Forest encompassed 17,961 acres (7,269 ha) and District #18 included Carbon, Dauphin, Lebanon, Schuylkill, and the northern parts of Berks and Lehigh counties. After realignment, the state forest tracts in Columbia and Northumberland counties were added to Weiser State Forest, and Montour county became part of District #18 (they had previously been in Wyoming State Forest and District #20). Weiser State Forest and District #18 also lost territory as all of Berks and Lehigh counties became part of "Valley Forge State Forest" (renamed William Penn State Forest in August 2007) and District #17.

Weiser State Forest officially expanded into Luzerne County through two separate land acquisitions in November 2021 and August 2022.

== Neighboring state forest districts ==
- Loyalsock State Forest (north)
- Pinchot State Forest (north)
- Delaware State Forest (east)
- William Penn State Forest (southeast)
- Michaux State Forest (southwest)
- Tuscarora State Forest (west)
- Bald Eagle State Forest (northwest)
- Tiadaghton State Forest (northwest)

== Natural and wild areas ==
- Jakey Hollow Natural Area
- Sheets Island Archipelago Natural Area
