= John Barrow Island =

Island in Nunavut, Canada

- Location within Nunavut Location within Canada

Geography
- Location: Northern Canada
- Coordinates: 76°36′N 097°09′W
- Archipelago: Queen Elizabeth Islands; Arctic Archipelago

Administration
- Canada
- Territory: Nunavut

Demographics
- Population: Uninhabited

John Barrow Island is a member of the Queen Elizabeth Islands and the Arctic Archipelago in the territory of Nunavut. It is an elongated island located midway in the Penny Strait between Bathurst Island and Devon Island.

It is named in honour of Sir John Barrow, 1st Baronet, Permanent Secretary to British prime minister Lord (Charles Grey, 2nd Earl Grey).
