= List of islands of Costa Rica =

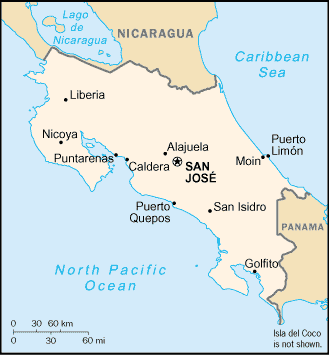
Map of Costa Rica

This is a list of islands of Costa Rica. There are about 79 islands in Costa Rica.

== Islands ==
The islands of Costa Rica include the following:

Islands of Costa Rica
| Name | Area | Coordinate |
|---|---|---|
| Isla Calero | 151.6 km^{2} (58.5 sq mi) | 10°50′58″N 83°37′23″W |
| Isla Brava | 44.4 km^{2} (17.1 sq mi) | |
| Isla de Chira | 43 km^{2} (17 sq mi) | 10°06′00″N 85°09′05″W |
| Isla Penitencia | 42.2 km^{2} (16.3 sq mi) | |
| Isla Tortuguero | 28.1 km^{2} (10.8 sq mi) | |
| Isla del Coco | 24 km^{2} (9.3 sq mi) | 5°31′41″N 87°03′46″W |
| Isla Palma | 20.5 km^{2} (7.9 sq mi) | |
| Isla Zelda | 4.20 km^{2} (1.62 sq mi) | |
| Isla Portillos | 16.8 km^{2} (6.5 sq mi) | |
| Isla Violín | 15.7 km^{2} (6.1 sq mi) | 8°48′00″N 83°38′00″W |
| Isla Samay | 14.7 km^{2} (5.7 sq mi) | |
| Isla Pacuare | 12.2 km^{2} (4.7 sq mi) | |
| Isla Moín | 11.7 km^{2} (4.5 sq mi) | |
| Isla Machuca | 11 km^{2} (4.2 sq mi) | |
| Isla Madre de Díos | 10 km^{2} (3.9 sq mi) | |
| Isla Damas | 6 km^{2} (2.3 sq mi) | 9°27′14″N 84°12′12″W |
| Isla Berrugate | 5.6 km^{2} (2.2 sq mi) | 10°02′38″N 85°09′26″W |
| Isla San Lucas | 4.6 km^{2} (1.8 sq mi) | 9°56′25″N 84°54′18″W |
| Isla Venado | 4.4 km^{2} (1.7 sq mi) | 9°59′11″N 85°03′39″W |
| Isla Parismina | 4.4 km^{2} (1.7 sq mi) | |
| Isla Caballo | 3.7 km^{2} (1.4 sq mi) | 9°59′13″N 84°58′59″W |
| Isla del Caño | 3 km^{2} (1.2 sq mi) | 8°42′21″N 83°52′47″W |
| Isla Matina | 2.2 km^{2} (0.85 sq mi) | |
| Isla Cedros | 1.7 km^{2} (0.66 sq mi) | 9°50′47″N 84°52′42″W |
| Isla Bejuco | 1.5 km^{2} (0.58 sq mi) | 10°00′04″N 85°02′03″W |
| Isla Tolinga (I.Tortugas) | 1.2 km^{2} (0.46 sq mi) | 9°46′09″N 84°53′34″W |
| Isla Primera (I.Negritos) | 0.8 km^{2} (0.31 sq mi) | 9°49′19″N 84°50′57″W |
| Isla Uvita | 0.8 km^{2} (0.31 sq mi) | 9°59′36″N 83°00′40″W |
| Isla Alcatráz (I.Tortugas) | 0.6 km^{2} (0.23 sq mi) | 9°46′45″N 84°54′02″W |
| Isla Segunda (I.Negritos) | 0.5 km^{2} (0.19 sq mi) | 9°49′19″N 84°50′57″W |
| Isla Jesucita | 0.4 km^{2} (0.15 sq mi) | |
| Isla Muertos | 0.3 km^{2} (0.12 sq mi) | 9°53′19″N 84°55′30″W |
| Isla Plata | 0.2 km^{2} (0.077 sq mi) | 10°26′53″N 85°48′12″W |

== See also ==
- Geography of Costa Rica
- List of Caribbean islands
