= Eagle Lake (Ontario) =

Lake in Kenora District, Ontario, Canada (lat 49.67, lon -93.28)

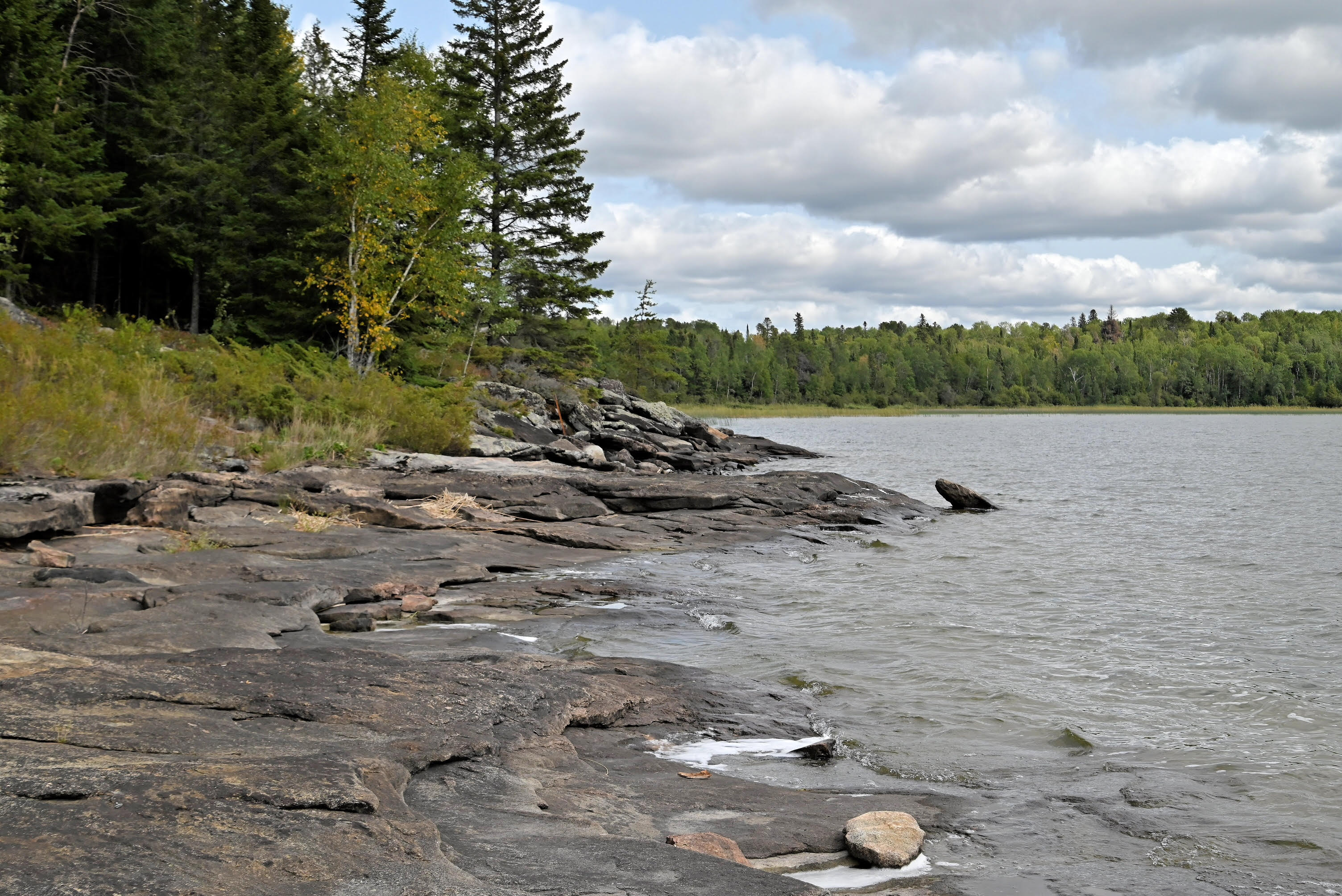

- Location within Ontario
- Location: Ontario
- Coordinates: 49°40′08″N 93°16′44″W
- Primary outflows: Eagle River
- Basin countries: Canada
- Max. depth: 110 feet (34 m)
- Surface elevation: 362 m (1,188 ft)

Eagle Lake is a lake in Kenora District, Ontario, Canada, west of the City of Dryden. The communities of Vermilion Bay and Eagle Lake First Nation are located on the lake's north shore.

Substantial islands in the lake include Staton Island, North Twin Island, South Twin Island, Net Island, Float Island, Boat Island, and Canoe Island. Large portions of the lake (West Arm, western shore, and around Muskeg Bay) are protected in the Eagle-Dogtooth Provincial Park.

== History ==
Ancient pictograph sites have been found on Eagle Lake, and in the 1600s the lake may have been part of the fur trade/exploration route.

Circa 1857, the Hudson's Bay Company (HBC) opened a fur-trade post on the lake, called Eagle Nest or Eagle's Nest House. It operated until 1872, reopened the next year, and closed in May 1876. By 1890, Eagle Nest was in operation once again as an outpost of White Dog. It is unclear when it closed permanently.

Around 1869, the HBC established another fur-trade outpost on the lake. In 1881, the Eagle Lake Post was relocated to the Wabigoon River near the Wabigon Post in order to be closer to the railway. Eagle Lake became an outpost of Wabigon and operated occasionally during the winters. It closed around 1903.

In 2003, Eagle-Dogtooth Provincial Park was established that protects portions of Eagle Lake.

== See also ==
- List of lakes in Ontario
