= Trodely Island =

Island in Nunavut, Canada

- Location within Nunavut Location within Canada

Geography
- Location: Northern Canada
- Coordinates: 52°14′N 79°26′W
- Archipelago: Arctic Archipelago

Administration
- Canada
- Territory: Nunavut
- Region: Qikiqtaaluk

Demographics
- Population: Uninhabited

Trodely Island (variant: Trodley Island) is an uninhabited Canadian arctic island located in the southeastern part of James Bay in the territory of Nunavut. It is 16.75 km (10.41 mi) northwest of Charlton Island.
