= Moore Island (Intrepid Passage) =

Uninhabited island in the Qikiqtaaluk Region, Nunavut, Canada

- Location within Nunavut Location within Canada

Geography
- Location: Barrow Strait
- Coordinates: 74°58′N 98°33′W
- Archipelago: Queen Elizabeth Islands; Arctic Archipelago

Administration
- Canada
- Territory: Nunavut
- Region: Qikiqtaaluk

Demographics
- Population: Uninhabited

Moore Island is an uninhabited island in the Qikiqtaaluk Region, Nunavut, Canada. It is a member of the Queen Elizabeth Islands group. It lies in Intrepid Passage, south of Bathurst Island. It measures about 2 km (1.2 mi) along its longest axis.
