= Des Voeux Island =

Island in Nunavut, Canada

- Location within Nunavut Location within Canada

Geography
- Location: Northern Canada
- Coordinates: 76°10′43″N 096°57′11″W
- Archipelago: Queen Elizabeth Islands; Arctic Archipelago

Administration
- Canada
- Territory: Nunavut

Demographics
- Population: Uninhabited

Des Voeux Island is a part of the Queen Elizabeth Islands and the Arctic Archipelago within the Canadian territory of Nunavut. It is an irregularly shaped island situated in the Queens Channel, closer to Bathurst Island than to Devon Island.

The island is named in honour of Sir George William Des Vœux, a former Governor General of Newfoundland and Labrador and Governor of Hong Kong.
