= Sunday Island (Nunavut) =

Island in Nunavut, Canada

Sunday
- Location within Nunavut Location within Canada

Geography
- Location: James Bay
- Coordinates: 54°22′N 80°46′W
- Archipelago: Arctic Archipelago

Administration
- Canada
- Nunavut: Nunavut
- Region: Qikiqtaaluk

Demographics
- Population: Uninhabited

Sunday Island is one of several uninhabited Canadian arctic islands in Nunavut, Canada located within James Bay. Nearby are the Bear Islands.

The island is surveyed for polar bear summer refuge.
