= List of islands of El Salvador =

This is a list of islands of El Salvador:

== Islands ==
Under Salvadoran control:

- Gulf of Fonseca
  - Meanguera del Golfo
  - Isla Conchaguita
  - Isla Meanguerita
  - Isla Martin Perez
  - Isla Perico
  - Isla Periquito
  - Isla Zacatillo
  - Isla Chuchito
  - Isla Ilca
- Isla Espiritu Santo (El Salvador)
- Isla San Juan del Gozo
- Isla Montecristo
- Madresal Island
- San Sebastián Island
- La Tortuga Island
- Isla de la Tasajera
- El Cordoncillo Island
- Olomega Lagoon
  - Olomega Island
  - Olomeguita Island
  - La Casita Island
  - El Borbollon Island
  - Los Chivos Island
- Lake Ilopango
  - Portillon Island
  - El Portillo Island
  - La Guitarra Island
  - Cerro Los Patos Island
  - Los Quemados Island
  - Chachagaste Island
- Lake Coatepeque
  - Teopán Island
- Lake Güija
  - Tipa Island
  - Cintular Island
  - Cerro Negro Islet
  - Ostua Island
  - San Pedro Island

Furthermore:

- Isla Conejo, in the Gulf of Fonseca; disputed with Honduras

== See also ==
- Geography of El Salvador
