= Stag Island (Nunavut) =

Island in Nunavut, Canada

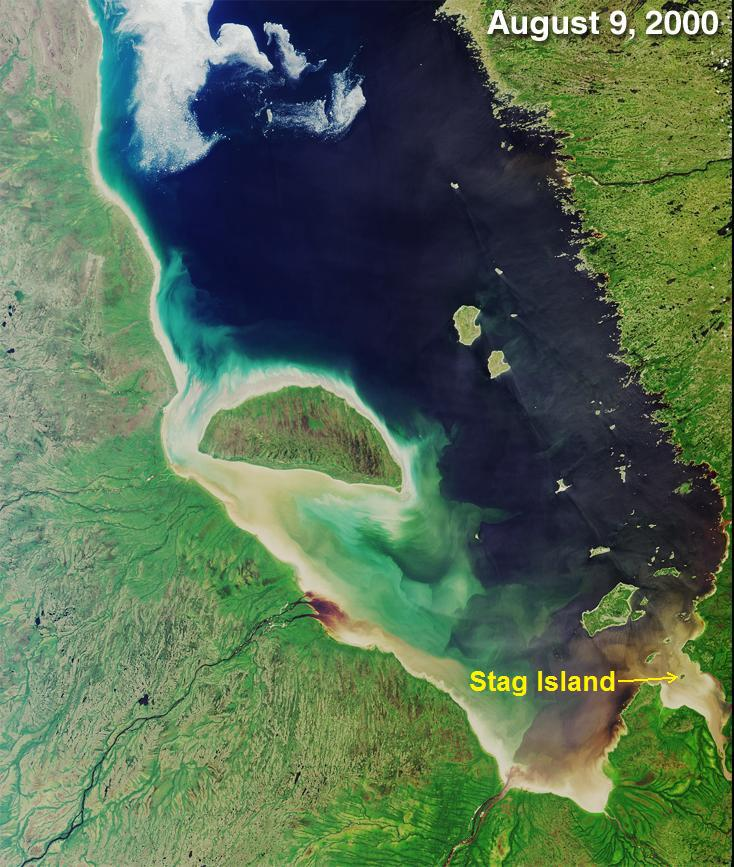
- Stag Island's location in James Bay

- Location within Nunavut Location within Canada

Geography
- Location: James Bay
- Coordinates: 51°39′01″N 79°04′28″W
- Archipelago: Arctic Archipelago

Administration
- Canada
- Territory: Nunavut
- Region: Qikiqtaaluk

Demographics
- Population: 0

Stag Island is an uninhabited island in the southern part of James Bay, in the Qikiqtaaluk Region of Nunavut, Canada. Located at 51°39′01″N 79°04′28″W, it is the southernmost island and point of land in Nunavut.
