= Hopewell Islands =

Group of islands in Nunavut

Native name: ᐃᓐᓇᓖᑦ Innaliit
- Location within Nunavut Location within Canada

Geography
- Location: Hudson Bay
- Coordinates: 58°23′N 78°6′W
- Major islands: Cox Island, Captain Island, McCormack Island, Young Island, Murray Island, Patterson (Napaartulik) Island, Harrison (Innalialuk) Island, Fraley Island, Frazier Island, Drayton Island, Leonard Island, Bartlett Island

Administration
- Canada
- Territory: Nunavut
- Region: Qikiqtaaluk

Demographics
- Ethnic groups: Inuit

The Hopewell Islands (Inuktitut: ᐃᓐᓇᓖᑦ, romanized: Innaliit) are an archipelago in the eastern part of Hudson Bay at the northern end of the Nastapoka arc. Administratively, they belong to the Qikiqtaaluk Region of Nunavut, Canada.

== Geography ==
The Hopewell Islands are a chain of islands off the coast of the northern Quebec region of Kativik, near the Inuit village of Inukjuak. The islands extend from Cape Dufferin at their northernmost extent to Pointe Normand at their southernmost extent, and are separated from the mainland of Quebec by the Hopewell Sound.

The largest islands of the group, from northwest to southeast, are Cox Island, Captain Island, McCormack Island, Ward Island, Moore Island, Young Island, Murray Island, Kit Island, Patterson Island (or Napaartulik Island), Bluff Island, Fairway Island, Harrison Island (or Innalialuk Island), Fraley Island, Frazier Island, Drayton Island, Leonard Island, and Bartlett Island.

== See also ==
- Hudson Bay
- Inukjuak
