= Jacob Island =

Island in Nunavut, Canada

- Location within Nunavut Location within Canada

Geography
- Location: James Bay
- Coordinates: 51.77°N 79.25°W
- Archipelago: Arctic Archipelago

Administration
- Canada
- Nunavut: Nunavut
- Region: Qikiqtaaluk

Demographics
- Population: Uninhabited
- Ethnic groups: Cree

Jacob Island (variant: Wood Island) is one of several uninhabited Canadian arctic islands located in James Bay, Nunavut, Canada. It is situated outside the mouth of Rupert Bay, 11.5 km (7.1 mi) from Quebec's Pointe Saouayane on Péninsule Ministikawatin.
