= Lougheed Island =

Uninhabited island in the Arctic Archipelago

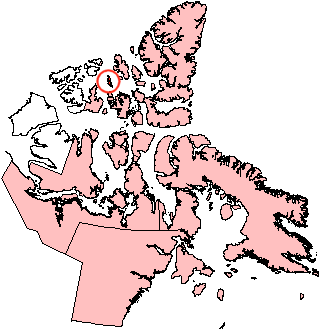
- Lougheed Island, Nunavut

- Location within Nunavut Location within Canada

Geography
- Location: Arctic Ocean
- Coordinates: 77°24′N 105°15′W
- Archipelago: Findlay Group; Queen Elizabeth Islands; Arctic Archipelago
- Area: 1,331.12 km^{2} (513.95 sq mi) (2026)
- Area rank: 43rd in Canada & 279th worldwide
- Length: 78 km (48.5 mi)
- Width: 23 km (14.3 mi)

Administration
- Canada
- Territory: Nunavut
- Region: Qikiqtaaluk

Demographics
- Population: Uninhabited

Lougheed Island is one of the uninhabited members of the Queen Elizabeth Islands of the Arctic Archipelago in the Qikiqtaaluk Region, Nunavut. It measures 1,331.12 km^{2} (513.95 sq mi) in size. It is relatively isolated compared to other Canadian Arctic islands, and is located in the Arctic Ocean, halfway between Ellef Ringnes Island to the northeast and Melville Island to the southwest. It is part of the Findlay Group.

== History ==
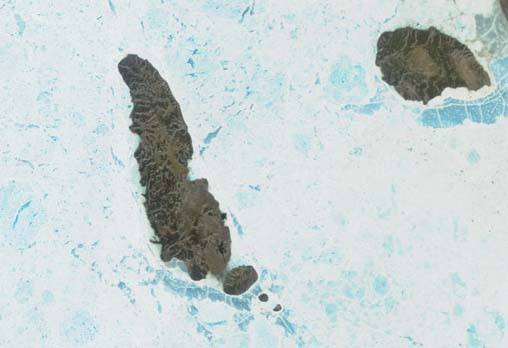
Lougheed Island and King Christian Island. Satellite image created by the MODIS Rapid Response System, NASA/GSFC

The first known European sighting of the island was in 1916 by Vilhjalmur Stefansson, during his Canadian Arctic Expedition.

The island is named for Canadian businessperson and politician James Alexander Lougheed. On April 14, 1993, Environment and Climate Change Canada revoked a permit issued to Panarctic Oils to dispose of 400 tonnes of scrap metal in the ocean off Lougheed Island. The decision was taken in response to concerns expressed by residents of Grise Fiord, Resolute, Arctic Bay and Pond Inlet. Instead of disposing of the material at sea, a research project was initiated to evaluate the environmental impact of stockpiling scrap metal on Lougheed Island. In 1994, Larry Newitt of the Geological Survey of Canada and Charles Barton of the Australian Geological Survey Organization established a temporary magnetic observatory on Lougheed Island, close to the predicted position of the north magnetic pole, in order to monitor short-term fluctuations of the Earth's magnetic field.
