= Franklin Strait =

Arctic waterway in Canada

Coordinates: 71°30′N 096°30′W

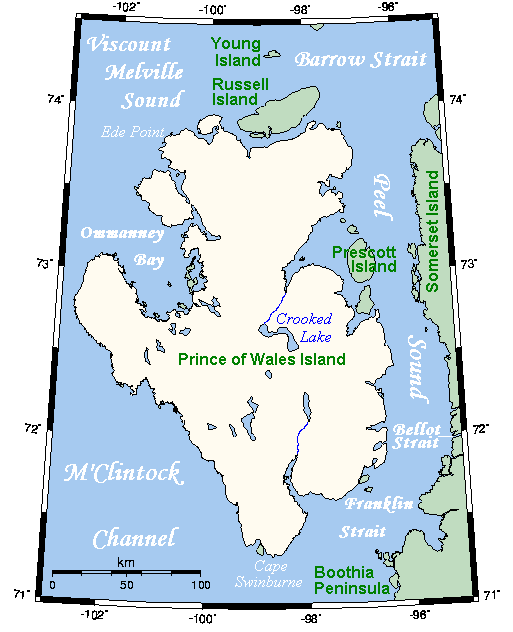
Prince of Wales Island with Franklin Strait to the southeast, Canada.

The Franklin Strait is an Arctic waterway in Northern Canada's territory of Nunavut. It is located between southeastern Prince of Wales Island and the Boothia Peninsula. It is on the south end of Peel Sound.

It is named after the English explorer Sir John Franklin (1786-1847), who perished in these waters on his lost expedition.
