= Penny Strait =

Watercourse in Nunavut, Canada

The Penny Strait (76°30′N 097°00′W) is a natural waterway through the central Canadian Arctic Archipelago in the territory of Nunavut. It separates Bathurst Island (to the south-west) from Devon Island (to the east). To the south and south-east, the strait opens into Queens Channel.
