= South Twin Island (Nunavut) =

Island in Nunavut, Canada

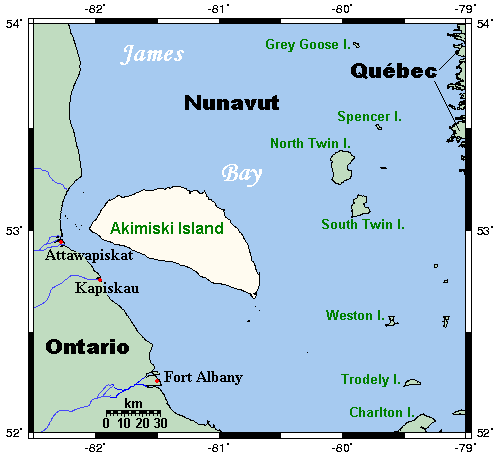
- A map showing South Twin Island and nearby areas, Hudson Bay, Nunavut

- Location within Nunavut Location within Canada

Geography
- Location: Northern Canada
- Coordinates: 53°10′N 79°50′W
- Archipelago: Arctic Archipelago

Administration
- Canada
- Territory: Nunavut
- Region: Qikiqtaaluk

Demographics
- Population: Uninhabited

South Twin Island is an uninhabited Arctic island located east of Akimiski Island toward the center of James Bay. The larger, similarly shaped, North Twin Island is located approximately 10 km northwest. South Twin Island has mossier tundra and fewer trees than North Twin Island. The two islands are referred to as the Twin Islands and are part of the Qikiqtaaluk Region of the Canadian territory of Nunavut.

South Twin Island is an important breeding site for Canada geese and semipalmated plovers.
