= North Twin Island (Nunavut) =

Uninhabited island in Hudson Bay

- Location within Nunavut Location within Canada

Geography
- Location: Northern Canada
- Coordinates: 53°18′N 80°00′W
- Archipelago: Arctic Archipelago
- Area: 157 km^{2} (61 sq mi)

Administration
- Canada
- Nunavut: Nunavut
- Region: Qikiqtaaluk

Demographics
- Population: Uninhabited
- Source: North Twin Island at Atlas of Canada

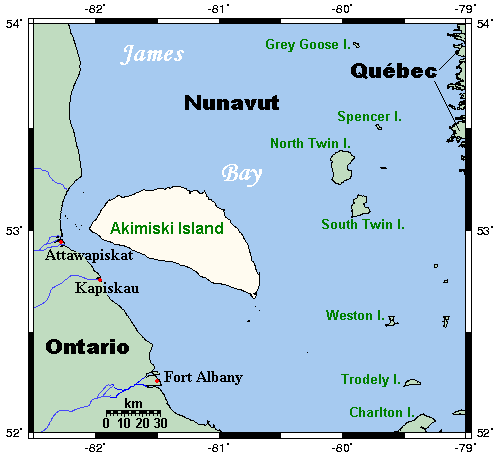
Map of the Akimiski Island area, including North and South Twin Islands

North Twin Island is an uninhabited Arctic island located east of Akimiski Island in James Bay on the southern end of Hudson Bay. The smaller, similarly shaped, South Twin Island is located approximately 10 km southeast. Together, they are known as the Twin Islands, and are part of the Qikiqtaaluk Region of the Canadian territory of Nunavut.

It is an important breeding site for Canada Geese and Semipalmated Plovers. It is also home to resident willow ptarmigans and Arctic terns.
