= Top Gear series 9 =

Top Gear
- Series 9
- Starring: Jeremy Clarkson; Richard Hammond; James May; The Stig
- No. of episodes: 6

Release
- Original network: BBC Two
- Original release: 28 January – 4 March 2007

Series chronology
- ← Previous; Series 8 Next → Series 10

Series 9 of Top Gear, a British motoring magazine and factual television programme, was broadcast in the United Kingdom on BBC Two during 2007, and consisted of six episodes that were aired between 28 January and 4 March. Production on the series was delayed by several months when Richard Hammond was seriously injured after crashing the Vampire dragster racer whilst filming for the show; the first episode, which welcomed him back, showed the footage of this crash. This series was the first to introduce feature-length specials focused on road trips with motoring challenges, with other highlights including the presenters attempting to build a Space Shuttle with a Reliant Robin, creating home-made stretch limos, and reaching top speed in the Bugatti Veyron.

A compilation episode that was delayed by Hammond's accident, featuring the best moments of the eighth series and titled "Best of Top Gear", was aired on 1 March 2007. Two specials were aired after the series concluded, with the first being Top Gear of the Pops on 16 March, a crossover with the BBC's music programme Top of the Pops, focused mainly on musical performances in the programme's main studio. The second special was another feature-length motoring challenge, titled Top Gear: Polar Special, which was aired on 25 July, focused on the presenters attempting to reach the 1998 location of the North Pole. The ninth series received criticism over some of its footage, including airing a mocked-up rail safety clip shortly after a major rail accident, while its Polar Special was criticised for attempting to debunk climate change concerns.

== Episodes ==
| No. overall | No. in series | Reviews | Features/challenges | Guest(s) | Original release date | UK viewers (millions) |
|---|---|---|---|---|---|---|
| 75 | 1 | Jaguar XKR • Aston Martin V8 Vantage | Roadworks in 24 hours • Hammond's Vampire dragster crash aftermath | Jamie Oliver | 28 January 2007 | 8.13 |
Clarkson and May welcome back Hammond after his near-death experience in the Vampire, before proceeding with business as usual as the trio see if they can improve the duration of road repairs, by taking on the job of resurfacing a stretch of the D5481 near Bidford-on-Avon themselves and completing it within 24 hours rather than a week. But chaos soon ensues, as May's detours causes traffic mishap, Clarkson's motivational speeches annoy everyone, and there are supply issues with the tarmac. Meanwhile, Clarkson pits the Jaguar XKR against the Aston Martin V8 Vantage on the track to see which is better, chef Jamie Oliver returns to see if he can be faster than fellow chef and rival Gordon Ramsay, and the trio look at the footage of Hammond's Vampire dragster crash. Note: After its broadcast, the BBC aired three repeats of this episode, but it was never repeated again after this due to the footage of Hammond's crash. However, this episode was added to (in its original form) on BBC iPlayer in 2021 along with all other episodes (including ones that have been edited).
| 76 | 2 | None | Bugatti Veyron to top speed at Ehra-Lessien • Shootout: Golf and Art in Coupes costing less than £25,000 (Audi TT • Mazda RX-8 • Alfa Romeo Brera). | Hugh Grant | 4 February 2007 | 7.20 |
The guys head out to Scotland to see which is the best stylish coupés, discussing them over a game of golf and then presenting them to the Scottish National Gallery of Modern Art to see which would be exhibited there—Clarkson feels it is the revised Audi TT, Hammond believes it is the old Mazda RX-8, and May hopes it is the new Alfa Romeo Brera. Meanwhile, May attempts to prove that the Bugatti Veyron can reach its top speed of 407 km/h (253 mph) on Volkswagen's Ehra-Lessien test track, and actor Hugh Grant is talking about his car history before seeing how he fared in the Lacetti. Note: This episode was originally due to have a segment where Clarkson created a mock public information film featuring a train crashing into a car to demonstrate the dangers of stopping on a level crossing. This segment was dropped prior to broadcast and was instead shown three episodes later. Because of this, the episode has a reduced run-time of 53 minutes instead of the typical hour.
| 77 | 3 | None – US Special | US Special: (Chevrolet Camaro RS • Dodge Ram 150 • Cadillac Brougham) | None | 11 February 2007 | 6.18 |
The trio try to see if it is better to purchase a car rather than renting one out. With $1000 to find a used car, each search around Miami for a good deal – Clarkson picks up a 1989 Chevrolet Camaro RS with a suspicious history to it, Hammond goes all American and takes a Dodge Ram pick-up truck, and May gets a rather bouncy and slow, 1989 Cadillac Brougham. With their cars, the presenters then begin a journey along the US South Coast, heading for New Orleans, where along the way they stop at a raceway to find out how fast each car is and see how good the brakes are without going into an alligator-infested river, seek out roadkill for an evening meal, and decorate their cars with slogans which might lead to them getting shot at in Alabama, which soon proves to be rather a bad idea. Upon reaching their destination, the trio's final task is to see how well they can give their cars away to those who need it, with assistance from a local Christian mission. In the closing studio segment Clarkson also revealed that after filming of the last segment of the film had been done, a lawyer had approached the group representing the mission and threatened to sue them for misrepresentation after it transpired that Clarkson's Camaro wasn't a 1991 model as promised but a 1989 model, further stating that they were told the lawsuit would be dropped on a settlement payment of US$20,000, before May added that after the lawyer had seen them, a group of "burly" men arrived and told them to "get off their street". Note: The closing credits replaced the first name of the presenters and crew members with references to American redneck stereotypes.
| 78 | 4 | Brabus S Biturbo roadster (based on a Mercedes-Benz SL65 AMG) • Porsche 911 Turbo | Reliant Robin Space Shuttle challenge | Simon Pegg | 18 February 2007 | 7.51 |
Hammond and May see if it is possible to convert a 1992 Reliant Robin into a Space Shuttle, with help from the British Amateur Rocket Society, but have 12 days to build it. They soon face a tough ordeal, with complicated engineering, but are highly ambitious of success and the hope of proving Clarkson wrong that the idea is preposterous. Meanwhile, Clarkson is seeing how good the Brabus S Biturbo roadster is, the result of a modifying company's work on the already monstrous 6.0L twin-turbo V12 SL 65 AMG, before putting aside his Bias for a review of the latest Porsche 911 Turbo. Meanwhile British actor Simon Pegg talks about his part in the film, Hot Fuzz, and sees how fast he was in the Lacetti.
| 79 | 5 | Lamborghini Murciélago LP640 | Railway crossing hazard video • Tractor challenge (JCB Fastrac 8250 • Case STX Steiger 530 • Fendt 930 Vario): Home-made biofuel • Top Gear survey 2006 results | Kristin Scott Thomas | 25 February 2007 | 7.58 |
The trio decide to grow their own petrol, but first must get to grips with some tractors they will use for the job – Clarkson chooses a speedy JCB Fastrac 8250, Hammond goes with a monstrous Case STX Steiger 530, and May picks the complicated controls of the Fendt 930 Vario. After putting them through their paces with a series of challenges at the test track, including setting a slower time than (the late) Richard Whiteley, and competing in a "Drag" race, the boys head to the 25 acres they've rented out to plough it before planting their own rapeseed biofuel. Meanwhile, Clarkson finds out how much of a hypercar the new Lamborghini Murciélago LP640 is, and creates a Public Service Video in regards to level crossings. Actress (and Cool Wall muse) Kristin Scott Thomas is in the Lacetti and discussing about the various cars on the Cool Wall.
| 80 | 6 | Shelby Mustang GT500 | Stretch limos from ordinary cars (Fiat Panda • MG F • Alfa Romeo 164 & Saab 9000) | Billie Piper • Chris Moyles • Jamelia • Lemar | 4 March 2007 | 8.12 |
The trio build their own limos and see who can make the best – Clarkson extends a 1992 Fiat Panda into a humongous limo, Hammond makes an open top limo out of a 1996 MG F, while May uses the front ends of a 1994 Saab 9000 and a 1996 Alfa Romeo 164 to make a conjoined limo. On the test track, they test each others out, before seeing how good they are in a number of challenges, before transporting a VIP to the Brit Awards, with Clarkson chauffeuring BBC Radio 1's Chris Moyles, Hammond taking Jamelia, and May driving Lemar, with varying degrees of trouble. Elsewhere, Hammond is test-driving the latest Shelby Mustang GT500, and actress Billie Piper is seeing if she is faster than the Ninth Doctor as the latest star in the reasonably priced car.

=== Best-of episodes ===
| Total | No. | Title | Feature | Original air date |
|---|---|---|---|---|
| S9 | CE | "The Best of Top Gear: 2006" | Best Moments from Series 8 | 1 March 2007 |
A look back at some of the best moments from Series 8. Note: This episode was due to be broadcast before the start of the series, but due to Hammond's severe crash, it was postponed indefinitely. When the repeat of the fifth episode of Series 9 was pulled, this episode was shown in its place.

=== Spin-Off Special ===
| Title | Guest(s) | Original air date |
|---|---|---|
| "Top Gear of the Pops" | Travis, McFly, Supergrass, Lethal Bizzle, Justin Hawkins | 16 March 2007 |
Top Gear does a special edition of Top of the Pops, with boyband McFly challenged to write and perform a song with the words "sofa," "Hyundai," and "administration" but not "love", "baby," or "heart". There are performances by Lethal Bizzle, Travis, guest Adrian Edmondson is on guitar alongside Supergrass, and the trio support Justin Hawkins with the closing number. Note: Complaints were raised by viewers following this special, in regard to James May throwing birds onto the stage of one of the performances that the trio were handling special effects for.

=== Special episode ===
| Total | No. | Title | Feature | Guest(s) | Original air date |
|---|---|---|---|---|---|
| SP | SP | "Top Gear: Polar Special" | Race to North Pole: Modified Toyota Hilux vs. Dog Sled | Sir Ranulph Fiennes | 25 July 2007 |
In this special edition of Top Gear, the presenters take part in a race to see who can reach the Magnetic North Pole first. While Hammond attempts to get their first with a sled pulled by a team of ten Canadian Inuit dogs and the aid of American explorer Matty McNair, Clarkson and May see if they can beat him with a specially adapted Toyota Hilux pick-up truck, all while seeing if a car can achieve the impossible and make it to the Pole for the first time. Prior to the challenge, the boys first underwent arctic training, learning how to pitch a tent and what to do if you fall in freezing cold water, before getting insight into the risks they would encounter from Sir Ranulph Fiennes. On their race from Resolute, Nunavut to the Pole, the group would deal with mountainous land masses, thin ice, polar bears, freezing arctic weather, and a massive ice boulder maze, which for the Hilux, will be the toughest test it has ever undergone. Note: This special did not feature an opening title sequence to it. In addition, each person credited in the special's closing credits had their first name replaced with "Sir Ranulph" in homage to Sir Ranulph Fiennes (e.g. "Sir Ranulph Clarkson", "Sir Ranulph Hammond", etc.). This was the first episode of Top Gear to be shown in high-definition.

== Criticism and controversy ==
=== "Mental" comments ===
Following the broadcast of the first episode of the series, several viewers complained after watching Clarkson ask Hammond how he felt after the crash with the question "Are you now a mental?", before witnessing May offer him a tissue in case he "dribbled". In response to the complaints, the BBC claimed that the comments had been merely made as a joke, but realised they would have caused offence to mentally disabled and brain-damaged viewers, and thus apologised for failing to consider this.

=== US Special: Cow on Camaro ===
Following the airing of the US Special, both the BBC and the UK media regulator Ofcom received 91 complaints in regards to the scene in which Clarkson drove to the trio's campsite with a cow tied to his Camaro. In response to this, the BBC defended the programme by stating that the cow had not been harmed or injured by Clarkson and that it had died several days previously before the scene was filmed.

=== Level crossing public service video ===
During episode 5, Clarkson filmed a segment in which he did a public service video about level crossings, with a reconstruction organised by Network Rail as part of their Don't Run The Risk campaign. However, the segment was heavily criticised after it had been aired. Some of the criticism it garnered was due to the fact that it was broadcast two days after the Cumbria train crash, even though the crash had not been caused by a track incursion. Other criticism was on the reconstruction by Network Rail, with Anthony Smith, chief executive of the rail watchdog Passenger Focus, stating that "We need to raise awareness of the issue, but now is not the right time." However, because the item had been delayed for several weeks due to an earlier fatal level crossing crash, it was decided that with only one more programme remaining in the series along with the frequency of level crossing accidents, that there was no other "appropriate" time to show the film without "offending" somebody.

A repeat of the episode was due to be aired on 1 March 2007, but because of another death on a level crossing that had occurred earlier that morning, it was decided that the repeat would not be shown. Instead, it was replaced with the "Best of Top Gear" episode that had been postponed by Hammond's crash.

=== Polar Special ===
Following the broadcast of the Polar Special, the BBC Trust found that the scene in which both Jeremy Clarkson and James May were shown to be drinking a gin and tonic whilst driving through an ice field, could "glamorise the misuse of alcohol" and that it "was not editorially justified in the context of a family show pre-watershed", despite the producer's claiming they were beyond the jurisdiction of drink driving laws, and Clarkson stating on the programme that he was not driving but "sailing" (piloting a vehicle on (frozen) water as opposed to actual land).

In addition, Emily Armistead, a speaker of Greenpeace, heavily criticised the episode. In an article by the Daily Express, she condemned the feature as being "highly irresponsible", further adding that Top Gear had taken some of most polluting vehicles on the road to try to destroy the Arctic quicker than climate change was and that Clarkson "represented some climate-sceptic views and for someone to be on national television saying that is quite alarming."

The final car destination shows 78°35'07.0"N 104°11'09.0"W as the North Pole, which is somewhere west of Ellef Ringnes Island, and was the location of the Magnetic North Pole in 1996.
