= Polar Challenge =

The Polar Challenge was a competitive, 350 nautical mile (650 kilometer) team race taking place in the Arctic, to the 1996 location of the Magnetic North Pole. The race ran between mid-April and mid-May each year, taking teams approximately 4 weeks to complete, including the training time. This event should not be confused with the Polar Race, which was a different event taking a different route, and run by a different organisation.

== Background ==
Competitors raced in teams of 3, many joining as individuals and forming teams when they meet other individuals during the training that led up to the race. The competitors were from different walks of life (not necessarily explorers or people with mountaineering experience), sharing a quest for adventure and to achieve something that only a few others had done. The race took place in one of the world's most extreme and hostile environments, with temperatures dropping as low as -35 °C, and where 80% of the world's population of polar bears live. Competitors raced on skis, pulling their supplies in 120 lb pulkas, stopping en route at 3 staffed checkpoints to re-supply.

== Race history ==
In 2003, Chris McLeod and Tony Martin captained the first and second place teams, respectively, in the first ever Polar Race. On their return to England, they decided to set up and run an alternative challenge themselves, and formed Polar Challenge Limited. Since then, they have organised and run the Polar Challenge every year. In 2004 the race was filmed for a BBC documentary series called 'The Challenge' which aired on worldwide television. Paul "Seamus" Hogan, a sales manager from London, England, with no experience of the outdoors whatsoever, was asked to enter the Challenge for the program. His team, Team Fujitsu led by Chris McLeod went on to win the race. In 2007, at the same time as the Challenge, the BBC's Top Gear programme presenters became the first people to drive to the 1996 location of the magnetic north pole in the Hilux Arctic Challenge. It was later broadcast as the Top Gear: Polar Special.

The current race record holders are Team Hardware.com, consisting of Henry Cookson, Rupert Longsdon & Rory Sweet who won the challenge in 2005, they then went on to enter the Guinness Book of Records by being the first people to reach the Southern Pole of Inaccessibility by foot & kite ski in 2007. They were guided here by veteran guide Paul Landry whom they met during training in Resolute Bay prior to the race starting.

== Route ==
The Polar Challenge route covered 284 nautical miles (526 km). Competitors began by participating in a 4-day, 65-nautical-mile (120 km) training expedition in which they set off from Resolute, Nunavut in northern Canada to Polaris Mine on Little Cornwallis Island, the Polar Challenge starting point. The race itself was from Polaris Mine to Isachsen on Ellef Ringnes Island through 3 checkpoints. The first two checkpoints were re-supply points where competitors rested for 12–24 hours and took on new food and fuel supplies, and the third was the 1996 position of the Magnetic North Pole. The finish line was a further 25 miles beyond the third checkpoint, near a disused airstrip where planes could land.

- Preliminary Stage: From Resolute to Polaris Mine area, just north of Cornwallis Island – Distance: 65 nautical miles (120 km)
- Stage 1: From Polaris Mine area to a way point, just North West of Bathurst Island (Checkpoint 1 - 76°37’N 101°50’W) – Distance: 110 nautical miles (200 km)
- Stage 2: Bathurst Island to a waypoint near King Christian Island (Checkpoint 2 - 77°46’N 101°45’W) – Distance: 95 nautical miles (176 km)
- Stage 3: King Christian Island to 1996 Magnetic North Pole position (Checkpoint 3 - 78°35.7'N 104°11.9’W) – Distance: 63 nautical miles (117 km)
- Stage 4: 1996 Magnetic North Pole position to Isachsen (Finish - 78°47’N 103°30’W) – Distance: 16 nautical miles (30 km)

== 2004 - 2006 polar challenges ==
- The Fujitsu Polar Challenge – in 2004, was won by Team Fujitsu.
- The Scott Dunn Polar Challenge – in 2005, was won by Team Hardware.com - who set the race record of 9 days, 11 hours and 55 minutes, breaking the previous record of Team Fujitsu by 2 days.
- The Sony Polar Challenge – in 2006, was won by Team ATP.

== 2007 Polar Challenge teams ==
The 2007 challenge took place in April/May 2007 and was won by team Bearing 360 North and saw the following teams compete:

- Arctic Virgins: Alex Zawadzki, Laura Jones, Kirsty Bamber (Stewart)
- Bearing 360 North: Christopher Mike, James Cheshire, Jonny Black
- Girls on Top: Rachael Helanor, Tina Outlaw
- Artemis: Mark Bates, Ian Hunter, Jean Walker
- Polarity: Thom Fortunato, Gabrielle Finn, Gary Marshall
- Team Spirit: Adam Komrower, Malcolm Rich
- Team Star: Steve Jones, Nick Bevan, Richard Yorke
- The Polar Bears: Martin Palethorpe, Miles Welch, Stuart Lotherington

In 2007 but not part of the main event; the route was filmed by a BBC Television crew for Top Gear: Polar Special, undertaking the same journey with modified Toyota Hilux pickup trucks and a dog sled.

== Polar Challenge 2008 teams ==
The Polar Challenge 2008 took place in April/May 2008 and saw the following teams compete:

- Polar Warriors/Cold Beef: Paul Moxham, Jamie Wood, Angus King
- Team Gamania Foundation: Jason Chen, Kevin Lin, Albert Liu
- Lost Penguins: Mike Woolliscroft, Connie Potter, Richard Wall-Morris
- Best Served Chilled: Steve Napier, Barney Franklin, Giles Greenslade
- The Silver Foxes: Jim Vale, Graham Walters
- Polar Flame: Leslie Dang Ngoc, Thomas Carrier, Da Liang
- Cold Front: Mark Priest, Mark Jurgens, Sam Long
- British Sea Power: Gareth Ellis, Yoyo Schepers, Alistair Leiper,
- The Holiday Club: Paul Craig, Oliver Corbett, Ross Maxwell

== Polar Challenge 2010 ==
The 2010 Polar Challenge was won by Team Avilton (formerly Team Dark Horse) who completed the race in 9 days 14 hours and 15 minutes, missing out on the race record by just 2 hours and 20 minutes.

Race standings

- Team Avilton: Tom Williams, Rupert Nicholson, Stephanie Brimacombe
- Team 1010: Andrew Peak, Michael Sugden
- Bear Babe: Leane Franklin Smith, Chris
- Team coin: James, Mark
- Team Schroder: (Solo) James Hooley
- Team Sheppard and the Cheese Rollers: Kevin Shepard, Jo Maddocks, Claire Stringer
- Global Village: Dwayne Fields, Ali, Lynda
- Team Wired: Dell Weingarten, Debora Halbert Ellen Piangerelli

The 2010 polar challenge was the first time all competitors and teams successfully completed the entire race.
