= Richard Profit =

Richard (Rich) Profit (born 1974) is an English mountaineer, sailor, a former British Army officer and polar adventurer. In 2007 he took part in the Polar Race with the mother and son pair Janice Meek and Daniel Byles, successfully walking and skiing 350 nautical miles from Resolute, Nunavut to the Magnetic North Pole in 20 days and 5 hours, helping to set two Guinness World Records. He is married with two sons.

== Background ==
Profit was born in Cheshire, England, and after living for a short while in the North West his family moved to Johannesburg, South Africa. He returned to England in 1978 and the family settled in Wokingham, Berkshire where he attended St Paul's Primary School, and The Forest School (Winnersh). In 1985 the family moved to the Midlands, England, and he attended Oakham School, where he was actively involved in the Combined Cadet Force and the Duke of Edinburgh Award Scheme (attaining Gold), and he was awarded School Colours for full bore shooting.

After school he took a gap year and travelled extensively through East and Southern Africa, undertaking safaris in the Okavango Delta in Botswana, Lake Malawi, Tanzania and climbed Mount Kilimanjaro (5895m). He completed his formal education by reading Applied Biology and Management Studies at the University of Leeds from 1993–1996, where he attained a 2(i)Hons.

Profit has been a keen amateur sailor, learning his skills in the Baltic Sea in 1995 and competing in the Army Sailing Association Regatta in 1997.

== Military career ==
Following university, Profit attended Rowallan Company 963 and Commissioning Course 971 at the Royal Military Academy Sandhurst, and was commissioned into the Royal Engineers. He left with the rank of captain.

== Adventures and expeditions ==
Profit has taken part in expeditions all over the world including Africa, South America and the high Arctic.

=== Major mountaineering expeditions ===
- 1995 – Cordillera Real (Bolivia). High altitude winter mountaineering expedition to climb:
  - Illimani (6438m)
  - Huayna Potosi (6088 m)
  - Chacaltaya (5421)
  - Charquini (5400m)

=== Polar race 2007 ===
In April 2007, Profit successfully took part in the Polar Race 2007 in April 2007. This involved walking and skiing 350 nautical miles from Resolute, Nunavut in Canada to the Magnetic North Pole. He was accompanied by mother and son pair Janice Meek and Daniel Byles, and played a key role in the expedition successfully setting two Guinness World Records. They survived the worst ice conditions for years, a near catastrophic tent fire, and areas of open water and slush to successfully reach the Pole in 20 days and 5 hours.

== Charities and organisations ==
Profit was a trustee of The Carpe Diem Trust , a charity aimed at helping ordinary people to undertake extraordinary achievements in order to help them develop their full potential.

He was also a member of the Association of Pole Lathe Turners, who aim to promote the traditional crafts of green woodwork.

Profit currently works with multinational corporations, community groups and individuals helping catalyse sustainable business and personal practice and helps to catalyse social change for a fair and sustainable future.
