= Polar Race =

The Polar Race was a biennial race from Resolute on Resolute Bay, Nunavut in northern Canada to the North Magnetic Pole. Teams of two, three or four walk/ski 350 nautical miles (650 km; 400 mi) pulling their food and equipment on sleds. Although not unsupported, there were strict rules on the carrying of equipment, with only food, fuel and camera batteries permitted to be replenished at the three checkpoints along the route.

This event should not be confused with the Polar Challenge, which was a different event taking a different route, and run by a different organisation.

== Background ==
In 1996, polar adventurers Jock Wishart and David Hempleman-Adams organised The Ultimate Challenge, in which they chose 10 Arctic novices from over 500 applicants and successfully led them to the Magnetic North Pole. On the same trip, they made the first scientific measurements by magnetometer and theodolite for many years to determine the exact location of the Magnetic North Pole: 78°35′42″N 104°11′54″W. In 2007, the latest survey found the pole at 83°57′00″N 120°43′12″W.

Following the success of the 1996 expedition, which proved that novices could be trained and equipped for a Polar expedition, the two men established The Polar Race. As of May 2011, 5 races have been run with 60 out of 61 competitors successfully reaching the 1996 location of the North Magnetic Pole.

== Race history ==
=== Polar Race 2003 ===
The first ever Polar Race was held in 2003, with four teams taking part. All four teams successfully reached the pole. The overall results were:

- 1st Place: Initial Style Explorers with a total time of 10 days 9 hours 45 minutes
- 2nd Place: Polar Team with a total time of 11 d 18 h 4 min
- 3rd Place: Extreme Steps with a total time of 16 d 0 h 55 min
- 4th Place: ViP3 with a total time of 19 d 8 h 32 min

Teams included Special Forces soldiers, Richard Dunwoody (professional jockey), Steven East, Mike Krimholz, Jock Wishart. Extreme cold temperatures were recorded at minus 47 and a 4-day whiteout situation.

=== Polar Race 2005 ===
The second Polar Race was held in 2005, with six teams taking part. All six teams successfully reached the pole, but with one competitor retiring early due to minor frostbite (which later healed fully). The overall results were:

- 1st Place: Neways Polar Team with a total time of 13 d, 17 h, 2 min
- 2nd Place: Gentlemen Adventurers with a total time of 13 d, 22 h, 38 min
- 3rd Place:Cable & Wireless Polar Team with a total time of 14 d, 22 h, 7 min
- 4th Place: Northern Stars with a total time of 15 d, 14 h, 49 min
- 5th Place: Pole Position with a total time of 17 d, 9 h, 5 min
- 6th Place: Ikey Icemen with a total time of 20 d, 6 h, 1 min

=== Polar Race 2007 ===
The third Polar Race started on 9 April 2007. All six teams successfully reached the pole. The overall results were:

- 1st Place: Team Refuge (Jake Morland, James Turner) with a total time of 14 d 19 h 36 min 53 s
- 2nd Place: Polar Horizon (Alex Henney, Emlyn Evans, John Barker) with a total time of 15 d 4 h 2 min 24 s
- 3rd Place: The Blue Tits (Charlotte Eddington, Sarah Lucas) with a total time of 17 d 4 h 35 min 54 s
- 4th Place: II Magnetic (Raymond Aaron, Roddy Caxton-Spencer) with a total time of 17 d 20 h 43 min 51 s
- 5th Place: The Brass Monkeys (Charlie Cooper, Danny Munden, Chris Wilkinson) with a total time of 18 d 2 h 9 min 56 s
- 6th Place: Carpe Diem (Janice Meek, Dan Byles, Richard Profit) with a total time of 20 d 4 h 57 s

=== Polar Race 2009 ===
The fourth Polar Race started on 9 April 2009. All five teams successfully reached the pole. The overall results were:

- 1st Place: Pole In One (John MacPherson, Iain Whiteley, David Stanton) with a total time of 15 d 7 h 42 min 30 s
- 2nd Place: Northern Lights (Ed Crowe, Julian Evans, Adrian Wells) with a total time of 17 d 8 h 20 min 30 s
- 3rd Place: Team Oman (Nabil Al-Busaidi, Claire Shouksmith, J-P Downes) with a total time of 19 d 5 h 6 min 30 s
- 4th Place: Magnetic Attraction (Lucas Bateman, Julie Jones, Arabella Slinger) with a total time of 19 d 20 h 5 min 30 s
- 5th Place: Team Standard Life (James Trotman, Roger Davies) with a total time of 19 d 21 h 8 min 30 s

=== Polar Race 2011 ===
The fifth Polar Race started on 9 April 2011. Both teams successfully reached the pole.

- The Internationals (Lee Swan, Ryan Malfara, Robert Platt)
- The Polar Slugs (Lucy Maizels, Rob MacAlister, Jo Winchcombe)
