= Celina Kalluk =

Canadian author

- Born: Resolute, Nunavut, Canada
- Occupations: Throat Singer; Children's Fiction Writer; Educator
- Children: Jazlin, Aulaja, Saima, Ramata
- Writing career
- Notable work: Sweetest Kulu

Celina Kalluk is a Canadian Inuk artist. She creates and performs in several mediums, notably the tradition of Inuit throat singing. In addition to her work as a musician, Kalluk has also worked as an actress, educator, and a children's author, publishing her debut work in 2014.

== Biography ==
Having been born and raised in remote hamlet of Resolute (sometimes given as Resolute Bay), in the Qikiqtaaluk Region of north-eastern Nunavut, Kalluk's works have promoted Inuit culture and heritage in Canada and beyond. As an educator, she serves as the Inuktitut Language Specialist and Cultural Arts teacher, supporting students in grades 7 through 12, at the Qarmartalik School in Resolute.

Tanya Tagaq, notable Inuk throat-singer, referred to Kalluk as her "beautiful cousin." (In Indigenous cultures throughout Canada, a cousin need not be a blood relative, and often refers to a close friendship or relationship.) Kalluk's throat-singing was featured in a documentary, The People Behind the Inukshuk, produced by the Inuit Tapiriit Kanatami for the 2010 Winter Olympics in Vancouver, British Columbia, and she created music for the 2018 theatrical film Tia and Piujuq.

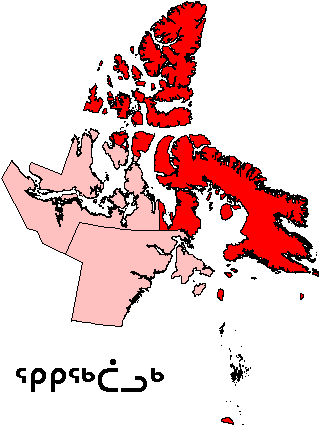
The Qikiqtaaluk Region of Nunavut, shaded in dark red.

== Sweetest Kulu ==
Kalluk's debut book, Sweetest Kulu, illustrated by Alexandria Neonakis, is available in English, French, Swedish, Greenlandic, and Inuktitut. The Inuktitut edition has been published twice, in both Roman characters and Inuktitut syllabics. The book was first published in 2014. It features a poem for a newborn baby, Kulu; "Kulu" is a term of endearment for babies and young children in Inuktitut. Kulu is blessed with the animals of the Arctic. The book emphasizes traditional Inuit values of care and stewardship for nature, respect for animals, and connection to the Arctic land.

Sweetest Kulu received several awards upon publication. It was named Huffington Post's Best Bedtime Book of 2014 and won an award from the Wordcraft Circle of Native Writers and Storytellers for the Best Picture Book in 2015. and was a United States Boar on Books Outstanding International Book.
