= List of accidents and incidents involving the DC-3 in 1949 =

This is a list of accidents and incidents involving Douglas DC-3 ^{A} variants that took place in the year 1949, including aircraft based on the DC-3 airframe, such as the Douglas C-47 Skytrain and Lisunov Li-2. Military accidents are included, as are hijackings and incidents of terrorism, although acts of war are outside the scope of this list.

== January ==
January 2
A Seattle Air Charter C-47A (NC79025) struck a hangar at Boeing Field International Airport, Washington during takeoff due to wing icing, killing 14 of 30 on board.
January 4
USAF VC-47D 43-48405 crashed at night near Weimar, California following an engine fire, killing all eight on board.
January 6
A Coastal Cargo C-47A (NC53210) crashed at Brandywine, Maryland, probably due to a loss of control following wing icing, killing both pilots.
January 7
USAF C-47A 43-15931 disappeared on a flight from Maxwell Field to McChord AFB with three on board; wreckage was found two days later near Mineral, Washington, 30 miles west of Mount Rainier.
January 9
An Aeroflot Li-2 (CCCP-L4261) crashed on climbout from Kazan after both engines lost power due to carburetor icing, killing three of four crew.
January 16
A Dalmia Jain Airways C-47B (VT-CDZ) disappeared near the Banihal Pass while on a Jammu-Srinagar passenger service with 13 on board.
January 20
Alaska Airlines Flight 8, a C-47A (NC91006), struck the side of Ptarmigan Head (27 mi northeast of Homer) at 2,800 ft (850 m), killing five of the six occupants on board and seriously injuring the surviving pilot. The designated flight path was to route from Homer to Kenai before proceeding to Anchorage, but the flight was informed that there were no passengers or cargo at Kenai, and replied "Will not land at Kenai" eight minutes before impacting Ptarmigan Head, nine miles east of the center line of the airway to Kenai.
January 22
A Scandinavian Airlines System C-47A (SE-BBN) burned out while parked at Luleå Airport, Sweden.
January 23
US Navy R4D-6 17263 crashed near Toledo, Ohio in bad weather, killing five of six on board.
January 24
RAF Dakota IV KN491 crashed in a forest near Utecht (then in East Germany) while on approach to RAF Blankensee, killing 8 of 25 on board.
January 29
An Aeroflot Li-2T (CCCP-L4491) stalled and crashed on takeoff from Nizhnaya Pesha Airport after the cargo shifted, killing three of four crew.

== February ==
February 6
An AECA C-47A (NC54335) was being delivered to the airline when it crashed into a river bank at Guayaquil, Ecuador, killing two of nine on board.
February 10
A Faucett C-47B (OB-PAV-223) struck a mountain peak while on approach to Huanuco, Peru en route from Tingo Maria, killing all 16 on board.
February 17
USAF C-47B 43-1138 crashed in mountains 32 mi south of San Antoniode los Cobres, Argentina, killing all eight on board.
February 19
A British European Airways Dakota C.3 collided in mid-air with RAF Avro Anson T.21 VV243 near Exhall, UK due to pilot errors, killing all 14 on board both aircraft.
February 24
A Cathay Pacific Airways C-47A (VR-HDG) struck a hillside near Braemar Reservoir in North Point, Hong Kong during an attempted go-around following an aborted approach to Kai Tak Airport, killing all 23 on board.
February 24
During takeoff at Cusco Airport, a TAM DC-3 suffered left landing gear failure and the left wing hit the ground. The left propeller separated and a blade penetrated the fuselage, injuring the pilot (who later died). The aircraft then caught fire and the crew were unable to access the cabin due to the fire, and escaped via a hole in the fuselage made by the propeller. Of the 26 on board, only 2 passengers and 2 crew survived.
February 28
USAF C-47B 43-16256 crashed at Cerro Colorado, Mexico in fog, killing all nine on board.

== March ==
March 12
An Aeroflot Li-2 (CCCP-L4335) struck the side of Mount Bel-Auty, Uzbekistan after the pilot deviated from the flight route to take a shortcut, killing all 11 on board.
March 22
During the Berlin Airlift, RAF Dakota IV KJ970 crashed near Lübeck during a Blind Approach Beam System (BABS) approach, killing all three crew.
March 30
USAF C-47B 43-48295 crashed and sank in a pond near Edgar Springs, Missouri during a storm; of the seven on board, only six bodies are recovered from the wreckage.
March 31
A USAF C-47 crashed and burned near Pope AFB, North Carolina while attempting to land at the base's officers club, killing the three crew.

== April ==
April 29
An Aeroflot Li-2 (CCCP-L4464) struck a mountain side 73 mi east of Kirensk, Russia following a navigation error, killing 14 of 24 on board.

== May ==
May 7
A Philippine Air Lines C-47B (PI-C98) crashed off Alabat Island following a bomb explosion, killing all 13 on board.
May 9
An Ecuador Air Force C-47 struck the side of Vulcán Tungurahua at 13,000 ft (4,000 m), killing all 11 on board.

== June ==
June 6
A TAE C-47A (SX-BAI) crashed near Malakasa, Greece (19 mi northeast of Athens) after the right wing separated in severe turbulence in a thunderstorm, killing all 22 on board.
June 6
Brazilian Air Force C-47B 2023 struck the side of Cambirela Peak (20 km east of Florianópolis) after flying into overcast, killing all 28 on board.
June 13
US Navy R4D-6 17219 struck a mountainside at Dry Canyon (4.7 mi from Santa Monica), killing all seven on board.

== July ==
July 2
A MacRobertson Miller Airlines C-47A (VH-MME) crashed and burned just after takeoff from Guildford Airport in Australia killing all 18 on board.
July 16
French Air Force C-47B 349050 crashed and burned at Mersa Matruh, Egypt while attempting an emergency landing following mechanical problems, killing all nine on board.
July 30
Eastern Air Lines Flight 557, a DC-3 (NC19963), collided in mid-air with US Navy Grumman F6F-5N 72887 over Chesterfield, New Jersey, killing all 16 on board both aircraft.

== August ==
August 1
An Aeroflot Li-2 (CCCP-L4354) crashed near Naberezhniye Chelny, Russia following engine failure due to fuel exhaustion, killing two of four crew; all four passengers survived.
August 9
RAF Dakota IV KN336 crashed on approach to Salalah Airport, killing all 12 on board.
August 13
A SAETA C-47 (HK-1200) crashed in the Andes mountains near Bojaca, Colombia, killing all 32 on board.
August 14
Turkish Air Force C-47A 6063 crashed shortly after takeoff from Ankara following engine failure, killing all seven on board.
August 19
A BEA Dakota III struck a hillside and crashed near Wimberry Stones at Saddleworth Moor due to navigation and pilot errors, killing 24 of 32 on board.
August 22
A STAAP C-47A (F-BEFK) crashed near Laghouat, Algeria due to engine failure, killing one of four crew.
August 27
A Sabena C-47B (OO-CBK) crashed shortly after takeoff from N'Djili Airport after failing to gain sufficient height, killing five of 20 on board.

== September ==
September 1
A TAJ DC-3 (XA-GAO) crashed and burned on takeoff after it struck a tree, killing one of 16 on board.
September 2
USAF C-47D 43-48713 crashed in Cook Inlet off Anchorage, Alaska during an instrument training flight, killing all seven crew.
September 5
An Li-2 (CCCP-I772) of MAP Omsk Aviation Plant #166 was being ferried from Omsk to Shcherbakov (now Rybinsk) when it crashed shortly after takeoff from Kazan following right engine failure; all 12 on board survived.
September 7
RAF Dakota IV KN536 was on a search and rescue mission for a missing Spitfire when it struck high ground and crashed near Taiping, Malaysia after flying into a valley, killing all three crew.
September 9
Canadian Pacific Air Lines Flight 108, a Douglas DC-3, was destroyed by a bomb and crashed in Sault-au-Cochon, Quebec. Albert Guay and an accomplice were convicted for the bombing. Guay was executed in 1951.
September 13
USAF C-47D 43-49123 crashed and burned at Barter Island Airport, Alaska during a supply mission, killing all five crew.
September 26
A Mexicana de Aviación DC-3A (XA-DUH) struck Mount Pococatepetl, killing all 24 on board.

== October ==
October 5
USAF C-47D 43-16386 struck Mount Mitchell, North Carolina, killing all nine on board.
October 9
USAF C-47 43-16062 crashed on takeoff near Isachsen Arctic weather station. Of the 10 on board, three were injured.
October 10
An Aerovías Coahuila DC-3 (XA-HOU) struck Sierra de Ovallos, Mexico (near Saltillo), killing all eight on board.

== November ==
November 4
A Harrington's Inc R4D-1 (NC29086) crashed at Akron/Canton Airport due to pilot error, killing all three crew.
November 14
Maszovlet Flight 381, a Li-2 (HA-LIK) struck a mountain while attempting a go-around at Pécs Airport, Hungary due to pilot error, killing six of seven on board.
November 20
An Aero Holland C-47A (PH-TFA) struck a mountainside near Hurum, Norway and crashed, killing 34 of 35 on board.
November 26
A LANSA C-47 (HK-305) crashed in mountainous terrain at Paramo Bogueche, Colombia, killing all 12 on board.

== December ==
December 1
A REAL Transportes Aéreos (PP-YPM) struck a mountain at Ribeirão Claro due to crew and airport errors, killing 20 of 22 on board.
December 7
An Arrow Air DC-3 crashes near Benicia, California, killing all 9 on board.
December 9
A C-47 disappeared over the Pacific off Baja California with eight on board. The aircraft, owned by a fishing company based in Ensenada, was reportedly carrying seven thousand pounds of live lobster.
December 12
Capital Airlines Flight 500, a DC-3 (NC25691), stalled and crashed on approach to Washington-National Airport, killing six of 23 on board.
December 12
A Pakair C-53 (AP-ADI) crashed into Karo Jubal mountain at Jungshahi, Pakistan due to a navigation error, killing all 26 on board. The airline shut down as a result of this accident.
December 16
A Mexicana de Aviacion DC-3A (XA-DUK) struck Cerro del Borrego (Orizaba, Mexico) after deviating from the flight route, killing all 17 on board.
December 18
A Sabena C-47A (OO-AUQ) crashed at Aulnay-sous-Bois just after takeoff from Paris following wing separation, killing all eight on board.
December 19
An Aerovias Brasil C-47A (PP-AXG, Amazonas) disappeared near Vitoria, Brazil on a training flight with six on board; the aircraft probably crashed at sea.
December 30
An Aeroflot Li-2 (CCCP-L4704) crashed on climbout from Sverdlovsk (now Yekaterinburg) after the crew became disorientated when the cockpit windows iced over, killing three of six on board.

== See also ==
- List of accidents and incidents involving the DC-3 in the 1940s

== Notes ==
^Note A Military versions of the DC-3 were known as C-47 Skytrain, C-48, C-49, C-50, C-51, C-52, C-53 Skytrooper, C-68, C-84, C-117 Super Dakota and YC-129 by the United States Army Air Forces and as the R4D by the United States Navy. In Royal Air Force (and other British Commonwealth air forces') service, these aircraft were known as Dakotas.
