= Isachsen =

Weather station in Nunavut, Canada

- Weather station
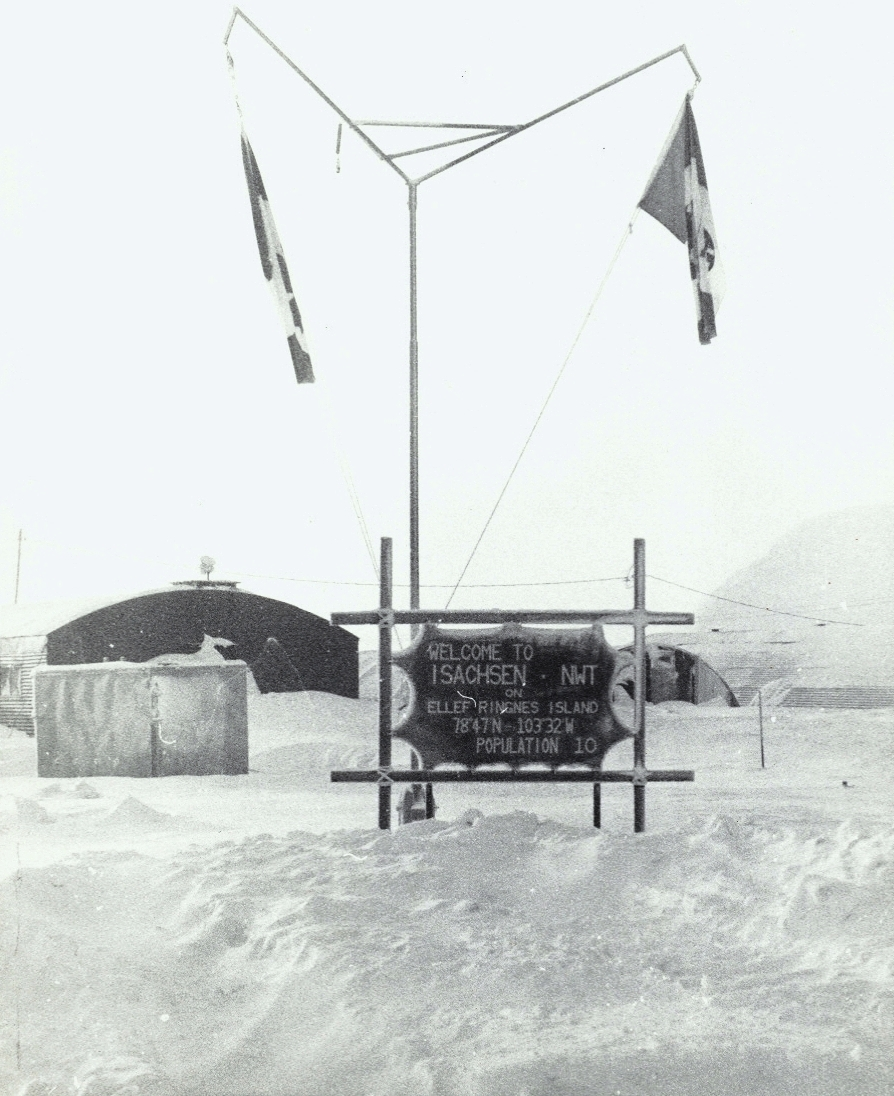
- Welcome sign at Isachsen 1974

- Location in Nunavut Isachsen (Canada)
- Coordinates: 78°47′N 103°30′W
- Country: Canada
- Territory: Nunavut
- Region: Qikiqtaaluk

Isachsen is a remote Arctic research-weather station named after the Norwegian explorer of the Arctic Gunnar Isachsen. It is on the western shore of Ellef Ringnes Island in the Sverdrup Islands, in the territory of Nunavut in Canada. Isachsen Station was established to participate in a joint Canadian-American weather observation program. Isachsen Station operated from April 3, 1948, through September 19, 1978. Regular weather observations began on May 3, 1948. In October 1949, a Douglas C-47 Skytrain (tail number 316062) crash-landed near the station. No one was killed, but three on board were injured. The wreckage has been preserved by the cold weather and dry conditions.

== Climate ==
According to Environment and Climate Change Canada, Isachsen and the surrounding area has the worst weather in Canada with a Climate Severity Index of 99 out of a possible 100. The climate of Isachsen is a severe tundra climate, with short, cool summers and long, cold winters. The record high is 22.2 °C (72.0 °F) on July 21, 1962, and the record low is −53.9 °C (−65.0 °F) on March 16, 1956.

Climate data for Isachsen, 1951–1978 normals, extremes 1948–1978
Month	Jan	Feb	Mar	Apr	May	Jun	Jul	Aug	Sep	Oct	Nov	Dec	Year
Record high °C (°F)	−1.5 (29.3)	−4.4 (24.1)	−8.3 (17.1)	−1.1 (30.0)	6.1 (43.0)	16.7 (62.1)	22.2 (72.0)	14.4 (57.9)	3.9 (39.0)	0.0 (32.0)	−3.9 (25.0)	−8.9 (16.0)	22.2 (72.0)
Mean daily maximum °C (°F)	−31.0 (−23.8)	−33.2 (−27.8)	−31.1 (−24.0)	−21.8 (−7.2)	−9.0 (15.8)	1.3 (34.3)	5.7 (42.3)	3.1 (37.6)	−5.9 (21.4)	−15.6 (3.9)	−24.7 (−12.5)	−29.2 (−20.6)	−15.9 (3.3)
Daily mean °C (°F)	−34.7 (−30.5)	−36.6 (−33.9)	−34.7 (−30.5)	−25.7 (−14.3)	−12.0 (10.4)	−0.9 (30.4)	3.2 (37.8)	0.9 (33.6)	−8.8 (16.2)	−19.4 (−2.9)	−28.4 (−19.1)	−32.8 (−27.0)	−19.2 (−2.5)
Mean daily minimum °C (°F)	−38.4 (−37.1)	−40.0 (−40.0)	−38.1 (−36.6)	−29.5 (−21.1)	−15.0 (5.0)	−3.1 (26.4)	0.6 (33.1)	−1.3 (29.7)	−11.6 (11.1)	−23.1 (−9.6)	−32.0 (−25.6)	−36.3 (−33.3)	−22.3 (−8.2)
Record low °C (°F)	−52.8 (−63.0)	−53.3 (−63.9)	−53.9 (−65.0)	−45.6 (−50.1)	−29.4 (−20.9)	−15.6 (3.9)	−7.2 (19.0)	−13.3 (8.1)	−29.4 (−20.9)	−41.1 (−42.0)	−47.2 (−53.0)	−52.2 (−62.0)	−53.9 (−65.0)
Average precipitation mm (inches)	3.4 (0.13)	2.6 (0.10)	2.8 (0.11)	5.2 (0.20)	9.9 (0.39)	9.2 (0.36)	20.7 (0.81)	23.2 (0.91)	17.9 (0.70)	11.5 (0.45)	4.4 (0.17)	2.8 (0.11)	113.6 (4.47)
Average rainfall mm (inches)	0.0 (0.0)	0.0 (0.0)	0.0 (0.0)	0.0 (0.0)	0.0 (0.0)	2.8 (0.11)	15.2 (0.60)	14.6 (0.57)	1.2 (0.05)	0.0 (0.0)	0.0 (0.0)	0.0 (0.0)	33.8 (1.33)
Average snowfall cm (inches)	3.3 (1.3)	2.6 (1.0)	3.0 (1.2)	5.3 (2.1)	10.7 (4.2)	6.3 (2.5)	5.0 (2.0)	8.1 (3.2)	17.7 (7.0)	12.1 (4.8)	4.4 (1.7)	2.8 (1.1)	81.3 (32.0)
Average precipitation days (≥ 0.2 mm)	5	4	4	6	10	7	9	12	13	10	5	4	89
Average rainy days (≥ 0.2 mm)	0	0	0	0	0	2	6	6	0	0	0	0	14
Average snowy days (≥ 0.2 cm)	5	4	4	6	10	6	3	6	13	10	5	4	76
Mean monthly sunshine hours	0.0	0.3	94.6	324.3	338.6	266.6	232.0	143.4	50.0	7.1	0.0	0.0	1,456.9
Source: Environment and Climate Change Canada

== Flora and fauna ==
There are no trees or shrubs that can live this far north. The plant life here is limited to small patches of moss, lichens, and a few tiny flowering plants. The wildlife here is limited to polar bears, Arctic foxes, caribou, Arctic hares, lemmings, seals, muskoxen, and migratory birds.

== History and background ==
On October 9, 1949, a C-47 cargo plane of the United States Air Force crashed on takeoff at the weather station. The plane had ten people on board: a US Air Force crew of six and four civilian passengers. The passengers were two U.S. weather bureau employees, a Canadian weather bureau employee, and a Royal Canadian Mounted Police constable. Three of the aircrew received cuts and bruises and everyone else escaped injury. The subsequent investigation blamed the accident on the plane being overloaded and attempting to take off with ice building up on the cockpit windshield and wings. At the time of the crash, there were 130 mm (5 in) of snow on the mud runway, a light snowfall and some fog. The wreck was briefly shown in the Polar Special episode of the BBC program Top Gear. Photos of the remains of Isachsen Station can be seen on the Hilux Arctic Challenge website, taken by the Top Gear team on their trip to the nearby 1996 North Magnetic Pole. The footage of the wreck was filmed on May 2, 2007. The episode first aired on July 25, 2007. The wreck site is located at 78°46′13″N 103°20′08″W.

During the 1950s, Isachsen Station was primarily collecting radiosonde observations. Along with weather soundings from similar stations such as Mould Bay, Eureka, and Alert, this information was used to complete the North American data, primarily used to produce weather forecasts over the North Atlantic Ocean, Greenland, and Iceland, and long-range weather forecasts for Western Europe.

The Isachsen Station was in an extremely isolated place, with supplies and new personnel flown in by the Royal Canadian Air Force, usually twice a year: in the late spring, and again in the early fall from an air base (now Resolute Bay Airport) at Resolute on Cornwallis Island. In turn, Resolute Station, like most northern communities, was supplied using ocean-going cargo ships aided by icebreakers during the late summer sealift.

The eight-man staff at Isachsen usually consisted of four Americans and four Canadians. The Americans were usually two weather observers, a cook, and a mechanic. The Canadians were usually two weather observers and two radio operators. All communication to and from Isachsen Station was via shortwave radio radiotelegraphy.

Fuel oil and diesel fuel for heating and cooking, and for the station's electric generators, respectively, were shipped to Isachsen by transport planes in standard metal fuel barrels.

During the summer of 1958, the Isachsen station was rebuilt using prefabricated buildings that had been airlifted in along with about a dozen construction personnel. The sun sets in October and it is totally dark for about three months with temperatures from −32 to −51 °C (−26 to −60 °F). In the summer, the sun is visible above the horizon 24 hours a day for about three months with temperatures from about 7 to 16 °C (45 to 61 °F).

In 1956, a plan by the Government of Canada to resettle the Inuit at several high Arctic locations was scrapped. These settlements would have included Isachsen, Alert, Eureka, and Mould Bay.

On October 31, 1971, the United States withdrew from participation in the weather program at the site. In 1971, the Canadian government made a significant investment in Isachsen to upgrade its buildings. Buildings were painted orange to assist landing aircraft to find the station. Then, in 1978, as a cost-cutting measure, the government decided to close one high Arctic station; Isachsen Station was selected, and it was closed down during that same year. The last manned weather observations were taken on July 31, 1978. An Automated Surface Observing System was placed at the site in 1989, linked by satellite communications to southern Canada. Isachsen is now uninhabited.

During the summers of 1989 and 1992, the closed weather station at Isachsen was the site of the High Arctic Psychology Research Station (HAPRS). The HAPRS operated under the aegis of the Polar Psychology Project, an international and transpolar multi-year program. Each time, six or seven researchers used each other as participants in investigations of the effects of isolation, remoteness, and cold on psychological and physiological processes such as taste perception, irritability, mood, subjective and hormonal measures of stress, brain waves, and sleep patterns.

In 1992, a survey was made of abandoned vehicles, fuel drums, and potential contaminants to assist Environment and Climate Change Canada in planning to remove such items from the site. The site contains asbestos, lead, mercury and lead. Plans are being made to remediate the site from 2027 to 2030.

== See also ==
- List of accidents and incidents involving the DC-3 in 1949
- List of research stations in the Arctic

== External links and photos ==
- Topographic map of Isachsen at the Atlas of Canada.
- Past 24 Hour Conditions in Isachsen (weather station)
