= Sue Stockdale =

British polar adventurer, athlete and motivational speaker

Sue Stockdale (born August 1966) is a British polar adventurer, athlete and motivational speaker. She became the first British woman to ski to the Magnetic North Pole in 1996 during an expedition led by David Hempleman Adams.

== Early life ==
Stockdale was born in Edinburgh, Scotland, and attended Firrhill High School. She became interested in sport after being inspired by her PE teacher Margot Wells, whose husband Allan Wells won the Olympic 100m title in Moscow in 1980. She became a member of Edinburgh Southern Harriers, and represented the club in many competitions including the European Clubs Cross Country Championships in Clusone, Italy in 1987. Sue went on to represent Scotland in 3000m indoor and cross-country events in 1989 and 1991.

Stockdale's interest in adventure was sparked when she took part in an Operation Raleigh expedition to Kenya in 1988. The mission saw Stockdale spend three months carrying out scientific, community and adventure projects, and marked the beginning of a keen interest in exploration.

== Expeditions ==
=== “The Ultimate Challenge” ===
In 1995, Stockdale responded to an advert looking for “10 novice Arctic explorers” to attempt to ski to the North Pole. The expedition was led by renowned adventurer David Hempleman-Adams, the first person to reach both the Geographic and Magnetic North and South Poles. Stockdale was selected for the team from 500 applicants, and undertook the challenge with national pride, stating before the expedition, “I have to do this, not just for myself, but for Scotland.” The team, which featured fellow Scot and explorer Josh Wishart as co-team leader, completed the expedition to the Magnetic North Pole a year later in 1996. The expedition lasted a month, and saw Stockdale make history as she became the first British woman to reach the Magnetic North Pole at age 29.

=== Further expeditions ===
In October 1996, Stockdale returned to her roots and reunited with Raleigh International. This time, she was Deputy Expedition Leader during a 3-month stint in Chile. From there, she joined Robert Swan as a mentor on his UNESCO “One Step Beyond Expedition” to Antarctica. The expedition saw 35 young people from 25 countries sail down to Antarctica on board the Professor Khromov, and work on a number of cultural and environmental initiatives. Stockdale then joined an International expedition to the Geographical North Pole in 1998, led by Victor Boyarsky, which covered the last degree from 89 degrees to the North Pole from Ice Camp Barneo on the Russian side of the Arctic. The expedition, dubbed “Brave Hearts in the Arctic”, saw her run into former expedition leader Hempleman Adams in a chance encounter, who was awaiting an airlift home from a helicopter.

In 1999 when Stockdale became was a member of the International Trans-Greenland expedition. As part of team of three other explorers from Norway and Germany, Stockdale skied across the Greenland Ice Cap in 28 days. The expedition was successful, but not without peril, as the team encountered a severe storm. Stockdale and the crew took shelter in a single tent for over 36 hours with little food or drink, "and just prayed that the wind would die and the tent would remain upright."

In 2017, she visited KulusukKulusuk, in East Greenland to spend two weeks traveling with local Inuit hunters to understand their way of life and how they travel with their dog teams across the frozen sea ice to hunt for seal and fish.

== Post-expedition life ==
Stockdale appeared on Channel 4’s Superhuman (2004), which put her through some of the toughest scientific tests ever shown on TV, including an escape from a crashed helicopter submerged under water. She finished runner-up.

Stockdale now is a motivational speaker, executive coach, podcaster, author and leadership specialist using her expedition experiences to inspire others. In 2019 Stockdale co-founded a non-profit podcast Access to Inspiration, along with Clive Steeper, interviewing a wide range of people worldwide. In 2021 it was ranked as one of the top 10% most popular shows globally.

Her professional speaking career has included FTSE 250 companies, leading Academic Institutions including Said Business School, Oxford; and Cambridge Judge Business School as well as charities and International Conferences. She is author, or co-author, of a number of business books and writes regularly for a number of international publications including Entrepreneur Country and Enterprising Women magazine.

In 2013 Stockdale became a patron for Ski 4 Cancer, a cancer respite charity based in UK.

In 2022, Stockdale led a ski touring group in Narvik in Greenland on an 'expedition cruise' with Panache Cruises.

== Personal life ==
Stockdale is married and currently resides in Wiltshire, UK.

== Awards and accolades ==
Stockdale received the Presidents Shield for Highest Personal Achievement from Royal Society of St George in 1996, and was recognised as a Pioneer to the Life of the Nation by Queen Elizabeth II in 2003. In 2024, Sue was awarded an Honorary Fellowship by the Royal Scottish Geographical Society in recognition of her achievements in exploration.

== Bibliography ==
Enabling Leadership: Developing a leader coach mindset, Sue Stockdale (Association for Coaching) 2020 ISBN 978-1-916345-00-3

The Ultimate Leadership Book: Inspire Others; Make Smart Decisions; Make a Difference (Complete Guide to Success) Carol O'Connor, Sue Stockdale, Clive Steeper, Martin Manser (Teach Yourself) 2020 ISBN 1473688574

Risk, All that Matters, Clive Steeper and Sue Stockdale (John Murray) 2015 ISBN 1473602475

Motivating People, Sue Stockdale and Clive Steeper (Teach Yourself) 2014 ISBN 1471801640

The Personality Workbook, Sue Stockdale and Clive Steeper (Teach Yourself) 2013 ISBN 1444181920

Cope with Change at Work, Sue Stockdale and Clive Steeper (Teach Yourself) 2013 ISBN 1444171259

The Growth Story, Sue Stockdale (Bookshaker) 2013 ISBN 1781330549

Secrets of Successful Women Entrepreneurs, Sue Stockdale (Bookshaker) 2013 ISBN 1905430035

Kickstart your Motivation, Sue Stockdale (Wiley) 2002 ISBN 0470843845

Achieving high levels of performance as a training instructor by modelling motor sport driving instructors (Industrial and Commercial Training Journal) September 2013

How to Thrive in Change and Uncertainty (Industrial and Commercial Training Journal) June 2013

Leading a rugby club? No, it's a small business (Industrial and Commercial Training Journal) January 2007

We must have courage, faith and chocolate biscuits (Industrial and Commercial Training Journal) February 2004

ARTICLES

Coaching in the age of convergence (Coaching Perspectives) 2020 ISSN 2632-9735

A helping hand through a crisis (Coaching Perspectives) 2020 ISSN 2632-9735

Leadership insights: from Champion to Chair (Coaching Perspectives) 2019 ISSN 2632-9735

Build it and they will change (Coaching Perspectives) 2019 ISSN 2632-9735

Global leadership isn't about geography, it's about mindset (Coaching Perspectives) 2019 ISSN 2632-9735

How transformational coaching change leaders, who in turn can change the world (Coaching Perspectives) 2019 ISSN 2632-9735

Carrying on the family legacy (Coaching Perspectives) 2018 ISSN 2632-9735

The heart at work and play (Coaching Perspectives) 2016 ISSN 2632-9735

Embracing vulnerability as a route to growth (Coaching Perspectives) 2018 ISSN 2632-9735
