= Top Gear: Polar Special =

Special Episode of Top Gear

- Directed by: Nigel Simpkiss
- Presented by: Jeremy Clarkson; Richard Hammond; James May
- Country of origin: United Kingdom

Production
- Executive producer: Andy Wilman
- Running time: TV cut 60 minutes Extended cut 75 minutes

Original release
- Network: BBC Two
- Release: 25 July 2007

Related
- Top Gear

Top Gear: Polar Special, also known as the Polar Challenge, is a special edition episode of BBC motoring programme Top Gear that was first broadcast on 25 July 2007 on BBC Two. The episode follows presenters Jeremy Clarkson and James May in their successful attempt to be the first people to reach the 1996 position of the North Magnetic Pole (in Canada) in a motor vehicle. They did not, however, reach the actual position of the North Magnetic Pole at the time which in 2007 was 150 miles away. They were also 1200 miles away from the geographical North Pole. For added drama and competition, they raced against presenter Richard Hammond who travelled by dog sled, the traditional means of transport around the Arctic. This was the first episode ever aired in HDTV.

== Summary ==
At Resolute, Nunavut, Clarkson and Hammond announce their intention to travel from the small hamlet to the 1996 location of the magnetic north pole. Hammond will travel via dog sled, aided by American explorer Matty McNair, while Clarkson and co-presenter James May attempt to beat them, travelling by motor vehicle, a feat that had not before been achieved. Clarkson chooses to use a Toyota Hilux, modified for arctic conditions by Arctic Trucks, to prove that Arctic exploration can be quicker and more luxurious than via traditional methods.

=== Preparation ===
Clarkson and May's team modified a Hilux, along with a second Hilux and a Toyota Land Cruiser Prado for the film crew, starting in December 2006. During the vehicle testing phase, the presenters were sent to Kaprun, Austria for cold-weather training by a former Royal Marines Reservist, who taught them basic survival skills. Before departure, they spent a further two nights of survival training out on the sea ice in Canada. Due to their constant tomfoolery, they were shown sobering images of the dangers of freezing weather and received a stark warning of the dangers they faced from polar explorer Ranulph Fiennes.

=== The expeditions ===
At 13:00 on 25 April 2007, both expeditions set out from Resolute towards Bathurst Island, an uninhabited island where they would be making camp for the first day. Hammond and McNair moved at a steady pace during the initial days of their expedition, being stopped only by the presence of a polar bear following them, while Clarkson and May drew ahead by taking advantage of satellite navigation to ensure that their route took them over smooth ice. Problems soon developed for the Hilux, though, when it nearly fell through thin ice and had to be rescued by the support team, resulting in the need to plot a longer but safer route.

Three days after starting out and having reached firmer ice, the motorised expedition's speed reduced drastically as they began encountering difficult terrain. From this point on, the expedition had to rely on their guides to scout ahead for a safe routes, with some routes proving impassible, forcing the team to backtrack. Extensive delays over the next two days saw the sled team catch up, although Hammond admitted that the physical and mental strain was already starting to take its toll on his health.

Clarkson's anger at being delayed led to poor decision making and damage to the vehicle, causing further delays and straining the relationship between Clarkson and May. However, they eventually passed through the boulder field and regained the lead on the sled team, encountering a crashed C-47 near Isachsen. Meanwhile, Hammond and McNair's relationship became more strained as Hammond began to realise that they were unlikely to win. This was confirmed on the morning of 2 May 2007 when the GPS system in Clarkson and May's Hilux read 78°35′7″N 104°11′9″W and confirmed that the team was finally within 1 mile of the 1996 location of the North Magnetic Pole (78°35.7′N 104°11.9′W). Following their victory, Clarkson and May contacted Hammond and revealed that they had reached the finish line. Hammond never made it to the destination, as it felt cruel to make him go on "just so Clarkson could gloat", so instead, he was collected along with the other presenters to be evacuated by plane.

For the end credits, in homage to Sir Ranulph Fiennes, each person who had been involved with the filming of the episode had their first name replaced with the words "Sir Ranulph" (e.g. "Sir Ranulph Clarkson, Sir Ranulph Hammond, Sir Ranulph May").

Note that the finish line, near an old weather station, was called "The North Pole" for entertainment purposes only; the actual North Pole is 800 miles further north, and the actual North Magnetic Pole at the time was a few hundred miles further north. The "expedition" was undoubtedly a hard challenge, but the 300-mile drive took place entirely within the territory of Canada, only about 150 miles further north than Canada's northernmost town, Grise Fiord, and still to the south of several permanently inhabited places. The landscape depicted is not the polar ice cap, but the frozen sea among the islands of Nunavut, Canada. Still, the events depicted should be understood as an actual polar expedition.

== Vehicles ==
The vehicles used in the special challenge to reach the Pole were two 2007 Toyota Hilux Double Cab 3.0l diesel pickup trucks, one Toyota Land Cruiser 120 and a trailer, all of which were heavily modified by an Icelandic company, Arctic Trucks. The Hilux was chosen for its exceptional durability, as demonstrated in an earlier episode of Top Gear. One Hilux was rigged with cameras for the presenters, and the others were used by the film crew, two driver/repair experts, and one polar expert.

All vehicles underwent the same extensive modifications to make them suitable for the Arctic conditions, including:

- The standard wheels and tyres were replaced with bespoke wheels and 38" studded snow tyres. The tyres were able to run at pressures as low as 0.2 bar (3 psi) for better traction over snow.
- The wheel arches were raised and extended, to protect and accommodate the larger tyres that had been installed.
- The standard 3.0-litre D-4D engine was modified to cope with the very low temperatures. Heaters were added to increase fuel and coolant temperature, a large heavy-duty battery was fitted, and the air intake was modified.
- A 90-litre auxiliary fuel tank was fitted, along with an extra-thick sump guard.
- The gear ratio was lowered to 1:4.88.
- Two winches that could be fitted either to the front or rear of each of the vehicles were carried, in case they got stuck in the snow.

The Hilux used by Clarkson and May became an exhibit because of its achievement, and is currently on display at the Toyota Great Britain Academy, situated at the Toyota Manufacturing Facility in Burnaston, Derbyshire. The one used by the film crew was put into storage, until it was later modified and re-used by May in 2010 during Series 15, Episode 1, in his attempt to get close to the still-erupting Eyjafjallajökull volcano.

In a DriveTribe video presented by Mike Fernie in May 2024, it was revealed that the first vehicle to reach the North Pole was not the presenter's car, but the one used by the film crew, which the presenters switched to due to severe damage sustained to the main vehicle. Continuity errors showing this change include the film crew vehicle not having window tints, nor extra interior lighting to help with the cameras; both vehicles still made it to the pole.

== Soundtrack ==
The episode was largely scored with compositions by Clint Mansell and performed by the Kronos Quartet, particularly the pieces "Lux Aeterna" and "Death is the Road to Awe", from the soundtracks of Requiem for a Dream and The Fountain, respectively. The episode also contained a segment from the soundtrack of John Carpenter's The Thing, and also features the songs "The Killing Moon" and "Never Stop" by English alternative rock band Echo and The Bunnymen.

== DVD and Blu-Ray release ==
In 2008, the BBC released a twin DVD box set entitled Top Gear - The Great Adventures (also known as The Great Adventures: Polar and U.S. Special), which contained both an extended version of the Polar Special and a cut-down version of the US Special. The "Director's Cut" of the extended version included an extra ten minutes of previously unseen footage, which included scenes of frostbitten extremities during the training in Austria, Clarkson and May discovering the abandoned Isachsen weather station (left vacant since 1978), and various other changes including new voice-overs and an alternative soundtrack to the original BBC broadcast release.

== Criticism ==
During the special, Jeremy Clarkson and James May were shown to be drinking gin and tonic while driving through an ice field in the Arctic. The BBC received complaints that the footage was "highly irresponsible". The BBC Trust found that the scene could "glamorise the misuse of alcohol" and that the scene "was not editorially justified in the context of a family show pre-watershed". The show's producers defended the footage, stating that it was "filmed in an uninhabitable area of the North Pole, in international waters and they weren't shown to be drunk or not in control of the car." Nevertheless, this segment has been edited out of subsequent re-runs, including streaming on BBC iPlayer.

Complaints were also made about scenes showing frostbitten genitalia and about staging of shots to mislead the audience. These complaints were rejected by the BBC Trust.
