= Climate Severity Index =

The climate severity index ranges from 1 to 100. The score 1 is the least severe and 100 being the most severe. The climate severity index is a ratio between an observed climate indicator and a reference climate indicator.

According to The Canadian Encyclopedia's list and ranking of relevant weather stations, the stations with climate severity index scores lower than 20 points include Penticton, Vancouver and Victoria, all of which are located in British Columbia. The highest score was Isachsen, with a score of 99, making it the most inhospitable place for human habitation.
