= Janice Meek =

Janice "Jan" Meek FRGS (formerly Cooper and Byles, born 1944) is a British adventurer and ocean rower. In 1997, she took part in the first Atlantic Rowing Race, the Port St. Charles Barbados Atlantic Rowing Race. Meek successfully crossed the Atlantic Ocean unsupported in a 23-foot (7.0 m) wooden rowing boat in 101 days with her son, Daniel Byles. She currently holds four Guinness World Records.

== Career ==
Meek has owned and run several restaurants, including De Courceys in South Wales, and has been a wedding organiser and events manager.

== Adventures and expeditions ==
=== Atlantic Rowing Race (1997) ===
Meek and her son, Daniel, participated in the first ocean rowing race and rowed 3,044 nautical miles (5,637 km) from Tenerife to Barbados. In rowing across the Atlantic, the pair achieved two Guinness World Records: they became the first mother and son team to row any ocean, and at 53, Meek became the oldest person at the time to row across any ocean. In 2005 this record would be broken by Pavel Rezvoy (66).

In 2006, Meek and her son were awarded a Guinness World Record certificate for being the first mother and son team to row any ocean in 1997 and 1998.

In 2007, she and her son walked and skied 350 miles (560 km) from Resolute, Nunavut to the Magnetic North Pole in 20 days and 5 hours.
