= Boosted Arcas =

American sounding rocket

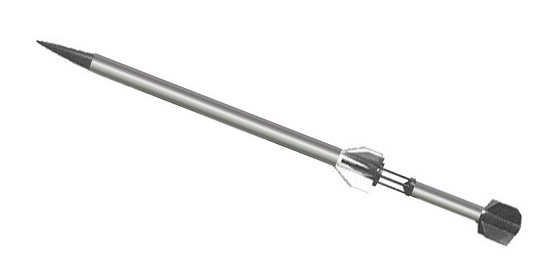
Boosted Arcas sounding rocket

Boosted Arcas is the designation of an American sounding rocket, in which an Arcas rocket was boosted using a first stage to improve the altitude and payload.

Variants of the Boosted Arcas were Boosted Arcas, Sparrow Arcas, Sidewinder Arcas, and Boosted Arcas II.

- The Boosted Arcas consists of a first stage of an Atlantic Richfield booster using a 0.8-KS-2700 solid propellant engine.
- The Sparrow-Arcas (or "Sparrow-HV Arcas") booster was based on the liquid-propellant AIM-7D Sparrow missile as a first stage.
- The Sidewinder-Arcas (or "Sidewinder-HV Arcas") used the solid-propellant AIM-9B Sidewinder missile as a first-stage.
- The Boosted Arcas 2 used a MARC 42A1 booster.

The maximum altitude of the Boosted Arcas amounts to 50 km, the takeoff thrust 1.00 kN, the diameter 0.11 m and the length 3.40 m. The Boosted Arcas was launched 78 times between 1963 and 1972.
