= Matty McNair =

American explorer

- Born: Pennsylvania, United States
- Occupations: explorer and polar guide
- Children: 2
- Website: northwindsexpeditions.com

Matty L. McNair (born in Pennsylvania, United States) is an American explorer. As of 2018 she was living in Iqaluit, Nunavut, Canada on Baffin Island. Among her many accomplishments are:

- 1997 leading the first ever all-female expedition to the Geographic North Pole.
- 2000 she led an expedition across Ellesmere Island through the Sverdrup Pass.
- 2003/04 she led two ski-all-the-way expeditions to the South Pole.
- 2003 crossed the Greenland Ice Cap with her children Sarah and Eric by ski-kites with dog sled support.
- 2004/2005 completed an unsupported ski expedition to the South Pole, again accompanied by her children Sarah and Eric, who became the youngest persons to ski to the South Pole.
- 2007 drove a dogsled with Richard Hammond in a race to the 1996 location of the North Magnetic Pole as part of Top Gear: Polar Special. This journey was cut short before her party reached the pole because the other competitors (in trucks) reached the destination first.
- She is the first American to ski to both the North and South poles.

== Books ==
On Thin Ice: A Woman's Journey to the North Pole (1999), ISBN 978-0-9685343-0-4
