= Arctic Trucks =

Icelandic automotive engineering company

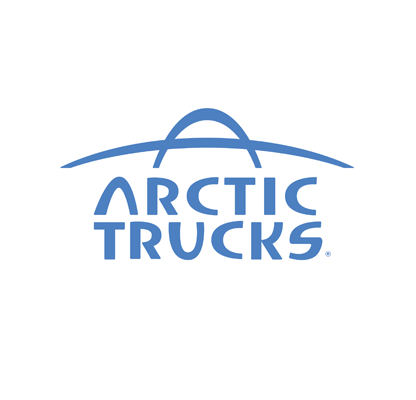
- Type: 4-wheel drive vehicle engineering
- Industry: Automotive
- Founded: 1990
- Headquarters: Reykjavík, Iceland
- Area served: Worldwide
- Divisions: Iceland; United Kingdom; North America; Norway; Finland; Poland; Sweden; United Arab Emirates
- Website: www.arctictrucks.com

Arctic Trucks is an automotive company in Iceland with operations in the United Kingdom, North America, Norway, Finland, Poland, Sweden and the United Arab Emirates. They worked on the re-engineering and after-market tuning of four-wheel drive vehicles.

== History ==
Isuzu D-Max modified by Artic Trucks

In 1990, Toyota in Iceland established its own division, calling it "Toyota Aukahlutir" (Toyota Accessories). In 1996, this division was renamed Arctic Trucks.

In 1999, Arctic Trucks Norway was established. In 2005, Arctic Trucks separated from Toyota Iceland.

Arctic Trucks offers tourism services through its Arctic Trucks Experiences brand, which is based in Iceland and has been operating since 2008. It provides support services to explorers and scientific surveys in the Arctic and Antarctic regions.

== Arctic Trucks Engineering ==
Arctic Trucks was established in Iceland in 1990 and specializes in the re-engineering and conversion of four-wheel drive vehicles for extreme conditions. Arctic Trucks vehicles set the record for the fastest journey to the South Pole in 2010, completing it in 108 hours; the journey started from Novolazarevskaya Station.

== Vehicle Categories and Services ==
Arctic Trucks offers three different categories of vehicles: Sports and Utility, Professional, and Exploration. They modify new vehicles from a variety of manufacturers to their own specifications.

Arctic Trucks converts Toyota Hilux trucks into electric vehicles with either a 28 or 56 kWh battery for mining and construction purposes.
