= Top Gear: US Special =

Feature length episode of British television show Top Gear

- Presented by: Jeremy Clarkson; Richard Hammond; James May; The Stig
- Country of origin: United Kingdom

Production
- Producer: Andy Wilman
- Running time: 60 minutes (TV Cut); 52 minutes (DVD Cut)

Original release
- Network: BBC Two
- Release: 11 February 2007

Related
- Top Gear (2002)

Top Gear: US Special is a full-length, special edition episode for BBC motoring programme Top Gear, and was first broadcast on BBC Two on 11 February 2007, as part of the 3rd episode of Series 9, with the special repeated in an edited version for UKTV channel Dave. The special sees hosts, Jeremy Clarkson, Richard Hammond, and James May travelling on a journey from Miami to New Orleans in three used cars to find if it's more economical to buy a vehicle rather than rent one. The Production Notes section of the Top Gear website describes the creation and production of this episode as "...damn near finishing off several members of the crew through exhaustion."

== Summary ==
Attempting to see if it is cheaper to buy a car for exploring the southern part of the United States for two weeks rather than renting one, Clarkson, Hammond and May travel to Miami and are each given US$1,000 to see what they can buy. They discover very few cars are available within their budget, with all three venturing into more dangerous parts of the city. Hammond finds a dealer that specialises in decommissioned law enforcement and government cars. Clarkson encounters a dealer that owns both a small pistol and a scoped rifle for personal protection. All three meet up outside the Miami Jai-Alai Fronton with their cars. Clarkson bought a 1989 Chevrolet Camaro RS, which he claimed had a murky past with the discovery of a mysteriously stained shirt in a compartment next to the spare tyre. Hammond bought a 1991 Dodge Ram D150 pickup truck, which despite dents and a loose tailgate, was in quite good condition. May bought a 1989 Cadillac Brougham, which had considerable wear and tear to it, and was quite bouncy as Clarkson and Hammond found when they pushed against it. Despite the initial faults, all three are delighted with their purchases and find themselves tasked with travelling to the Moroso Motorsports Park. Along the way, each reveal that their car had other issues to deal with - Clarkson had a radio that could only pick up a gospel preaching radio station, while most of his dials didn't work properly. May's Cadillac had poor acceleration and struggled to achieve a fast speed, yet was the only vehicle with working air-conditioning. Hammond had a radio that was broken and not connected, while his pick-up chassis appeared to be bent, veering to the right under acceleration, and to the left when braking.

Upon reaching the Motorsports Park, the trio learned that their cars would be sent around the Park's circuit and achieve as quick a time that it could make. All three learned that for this challenge, the cars would be driven by the Stig's American cousin, whom they nicknamed "Big Stig". Clarkson's Camaro proved the fastest, while May's, which was found to have an electrical problem and required a jump-start, was the second fastest. Hammond's pick-up was the slowest, and also had poor brakes after it came off the track. Following the challenge, the trio were then tasked with seeing how quickly they could reach 50 mph and how quickly their cars could stop from that speed. The challenge would take place at the drag strip portion of the raceway's track, where at the bottom of it was a river filled with alligators. Both Clarkson and May managed to reach the speed and brake before reaching the end of the strip, but Hammond failed to achieve the speed and only narrowly avoided driving into the river.

Following their time at the raceway, the trio were told that they would be heading onwards to New Orleans, stopping for the first night at a hotel, whereupon May suffered another electrical fault that required him to get another jump-start, much to the annoyance of the other presenters, while Clarkson bought fans to help both himself and Hammond deal with the heat, although Hammond discovered his had been sabotaged as a practical joke. Eventually, the trio were given $100 in cash to buy something for their car that would "make the journey more comfortable", with Hammond buying a grill, Clarkson buying a shower to replace his broken air conditioning and May buying a clothes rack, before learning that they would be camping for the second night and that their dinner would be whatever they could find dead at the side of the road. Switching to the side roads, they first found an opossum which May accidentally ran over, and then a tortoise which Clarkson refused to kill and instead ushered towards a nearby swamp. Hammond eventually found a squirrel and while preparing the camp with May, considered how to cook it. Clarkson went off for one more search, returning with a dead cow on the roof of his Camaro, which May refused to eat. Later that night, Clarkson and Hammond, feeling that he should suffer like them, successfully sabotaged the Cadillac's air-con, much to May's annoyance in the morning.

Prior to entering Alabama, the presenters stopped at the village of Bagdad and were instructed to paint each other's cars with slogans that could lead to them getting shot by the locals. While May gave Hammond's pickup a homosexual appearance and slogans, Hammond painted "Country and Western is rubbish" on Clarkson's, and Clarkson painted "Hillary for President", "NASCAR sucks" and "I'm bi" on May's car. However, the challenge had to be aborted when the three stopped at a filling station and offended the owner so much that, in one of Top Gear's most famous moments, the film crew's vans were pelted with rocks by friends of the owner, while May had to get another jump-start before he and Hammond could join Clarkson and the film crew in fleeing from the angered locals. Once the group had lost sight of them, they hastily removed the slogans on their cars and beat a retreat for the state border with Mississippi.

Once back on their way to New Orleans, the trio looked back to the journey they had with their cars and remarked that all had been enjoyable to use. Upon nearing their final destination, the presenters planned to sell their cars to see how much of the money they spent on them they could get back, but upon witnessing the damage that had been caused to the city by Hurricane Katrina the previous year, they abandoned the challenge and instead decided to give away their cars to a Christian mission. While Clarkson and Hammond managed to do so, May failed to find someone to take it. In the studio, May was declared the loser, while Clarkson revealed that after filming of the last segment of the film had been done, a lawyer had approached the group representing the mission and threatened to sue them for misrepresentation after it transpired that Clarkson's Camaro wasn't a 1991 model as promised but a 1989 model, further stating that they were told the lawsuit would be dropped on a settlement payment of US$20,000, before May added that after the lawyer had seen them, a group of "burly" men arrived and told them to "get off their street". Clarkson concluded that it was viable to buy, rather than rent, a car but summed up the trip by ending with "Don't go to America!".

As a reference to the American redneck stereotype, the four main presenters were credited as Cletus Clarkson, Earl Hammond Jr., Ellie May May, and Roscoe P. Stig, while each crew member's first name was replaced with the words "Billy Bob".

== DVD release ==
The US Special was released on DVD as part of the first Great Adventures box-set, which also contains the Polar Special. The DVD release of the special cuts roughly eight minutes of footage from the original broadcast, including a segment featuring a drive through a rainstorm, when the Camaro's wipers failed, and footage from the first scene in which the trio purchase cars. Some music cues were also changed for copyright reasons.

== Criticism ==
Following broadcast of the special, both the BBC and the UK media regulator Ofcom received 91 complaints in regards to the scene where Clarkson brought in a dead cow on the roof of his Camaro. In response to the criticism of the scene, the BBC defended the programme by stating that the cow had died several days previously and had not been harmed or injured by the presenter.
