= Pak Airways =

Airline from Pakistan, 1948–1949

Pakistan Airways also known as "Pak Air" or "Pak Airways", was an airline from Pakistan with its headquarters in Islamabad. The company was founded in 1948 and ceased operations in 1949 following a series of air accidents.

== Accidents ==
The airline was involved in four air crashes:

- 9 May 1948 at Basra, Iraq. No fatalities.
- 10 May 1948 at Basra, Iraq. No fatalities.
- 26 November 1948: First air crash of a Pakistani airline in the country, near Vehari, Punjab in which 21 people, 5 crew and 16 passengers were killed. Aircraft: Douglas C-47A-15-DK Registration: AP-ACE. Cause: believed to be technical error.
- 12 December 1949 at Karachi. 26 fatalities. Aircraft: Douglas. Registration: AP-ADI
