= Resolute Bay =

Bay in the Qikiqtaaluk Region of Nunavut, Canada

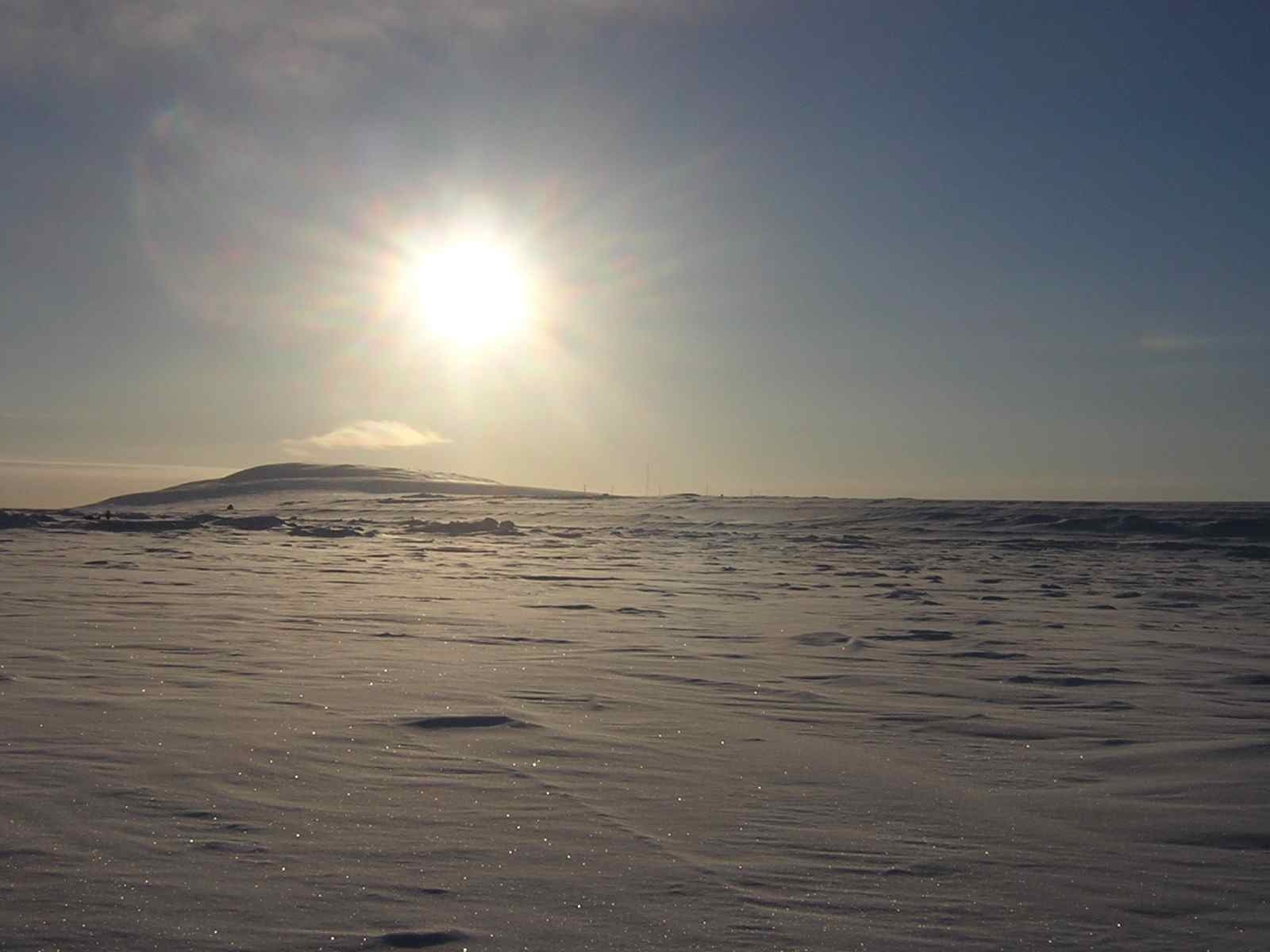
- Looking west along the edge of Resolute Bay.

- Location within Nunavut
- Location: Parry Channel
- Coordinates: 74°41′N 094°50′W
- Ocean/sea sources: Arctic Ocean
- Basin countries: Canada
- Settlements: Resolute

Resolute Bay is an Arctic waterway in the Qikiqtaaluk Region, Nunavut, Canada.

== Overview ==
Named after the Arctic exploration vessel HMS Resolute, it is located in Parry Channel^{map} on the southern side of Cornwallis Island.^{map} The hamlet of Resolute^{map} is located on the northern shore of the bay with Resolute Bay Airport^{map} to the northwest. The Inuit associated with Resolute Bay are called Qausuittuq and the population of the hamlet in the 2021 census was 183.

On the western shore, the Defence Research Telecommunications Establishment (DRTE) and the Communications Research Centre Canada operated a launch site for sounding rockets.^{map} Between 1966 and 1971 rockets of the types Black Brant and Boosted Arcas were launched.

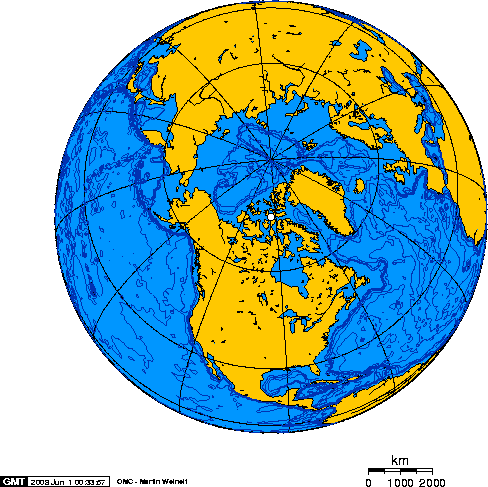
Orthographic projection centred over Resolute Bay, Nunavut, Canada.

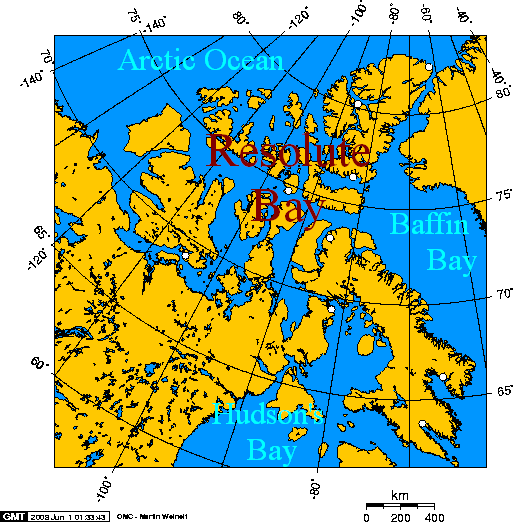
Resolute Bay, Nunavut, Canada - Lambert Projection.

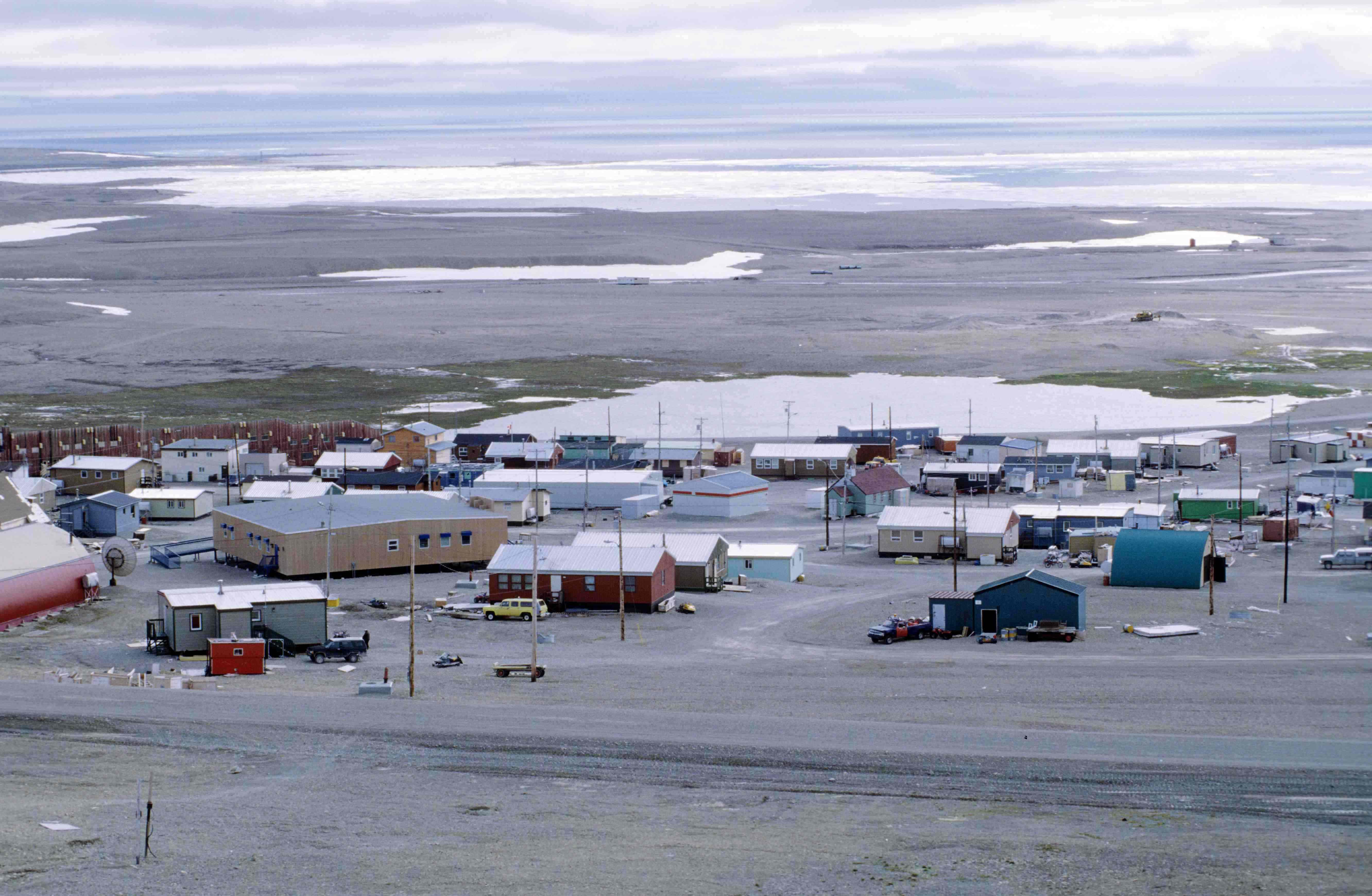
Resolute Bay: View from Signal Hill to the Inuit-Settlement "Village" and to Resolute Passage (August 1997)

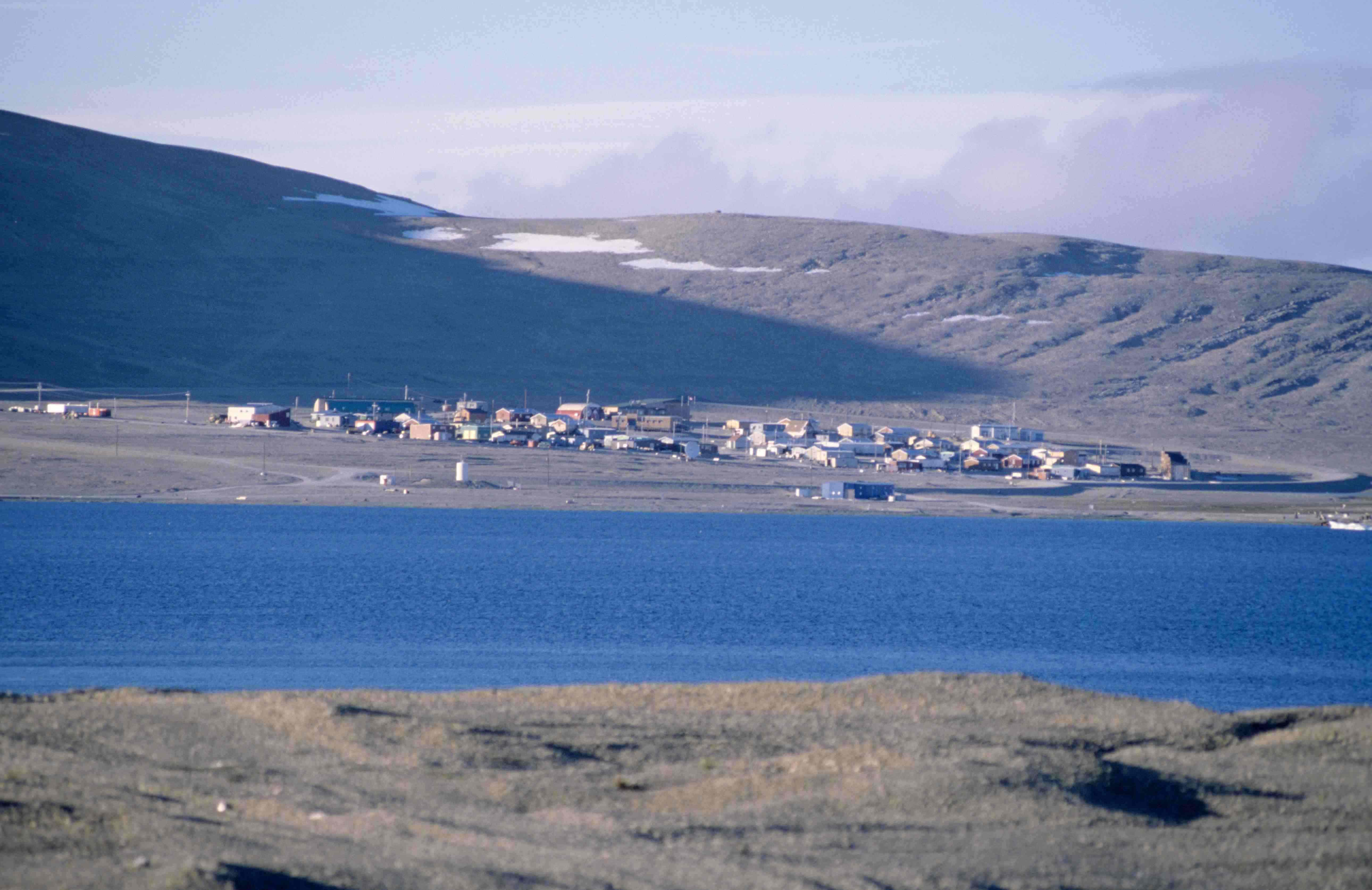
Another view over Resolute Bay to the Inuit Settlement "Village" (August 1997)

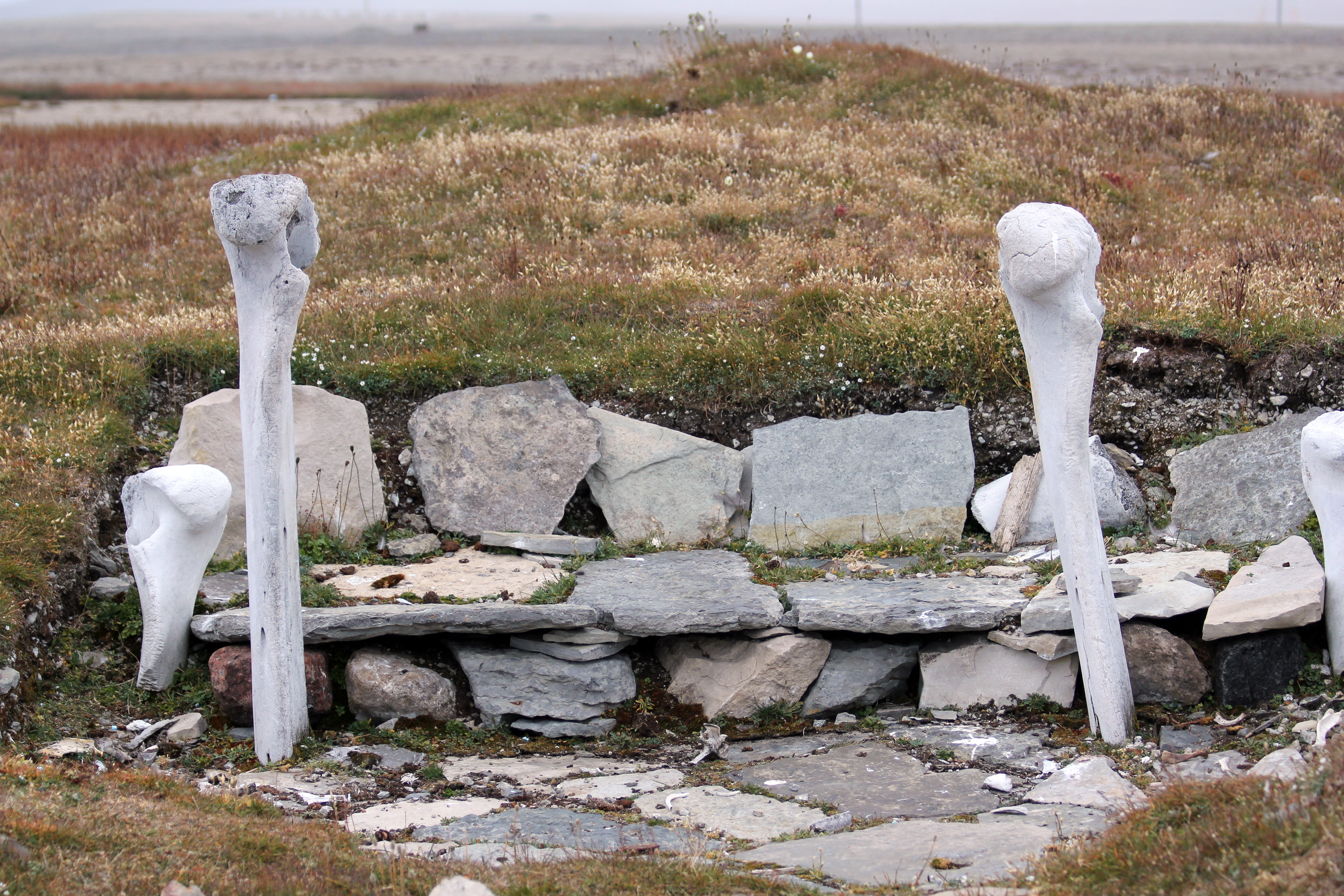
A small hut built some 600 years ago by the Thule people, ancestors of the Inuit, near the hamlet of Resolute it was restored by archaeologists.

== Mapping ==
- Parry Channel, 74°26′N 094°45′W
- Cornwallis Island, 75°05′N 95°00′W
- Resolute, 74°41′51″N 094°49′56″W
- Resolute Bay Airport, 74°43′01″N 094°58′10″W
- DRTE/CRC launch site, 74°41′N 094°54′W
