= Resolute, Nunavut =

Resolute ᖃᐅᓱᐃᑦᑐᖅ Qausuittuq (Inuktitut)
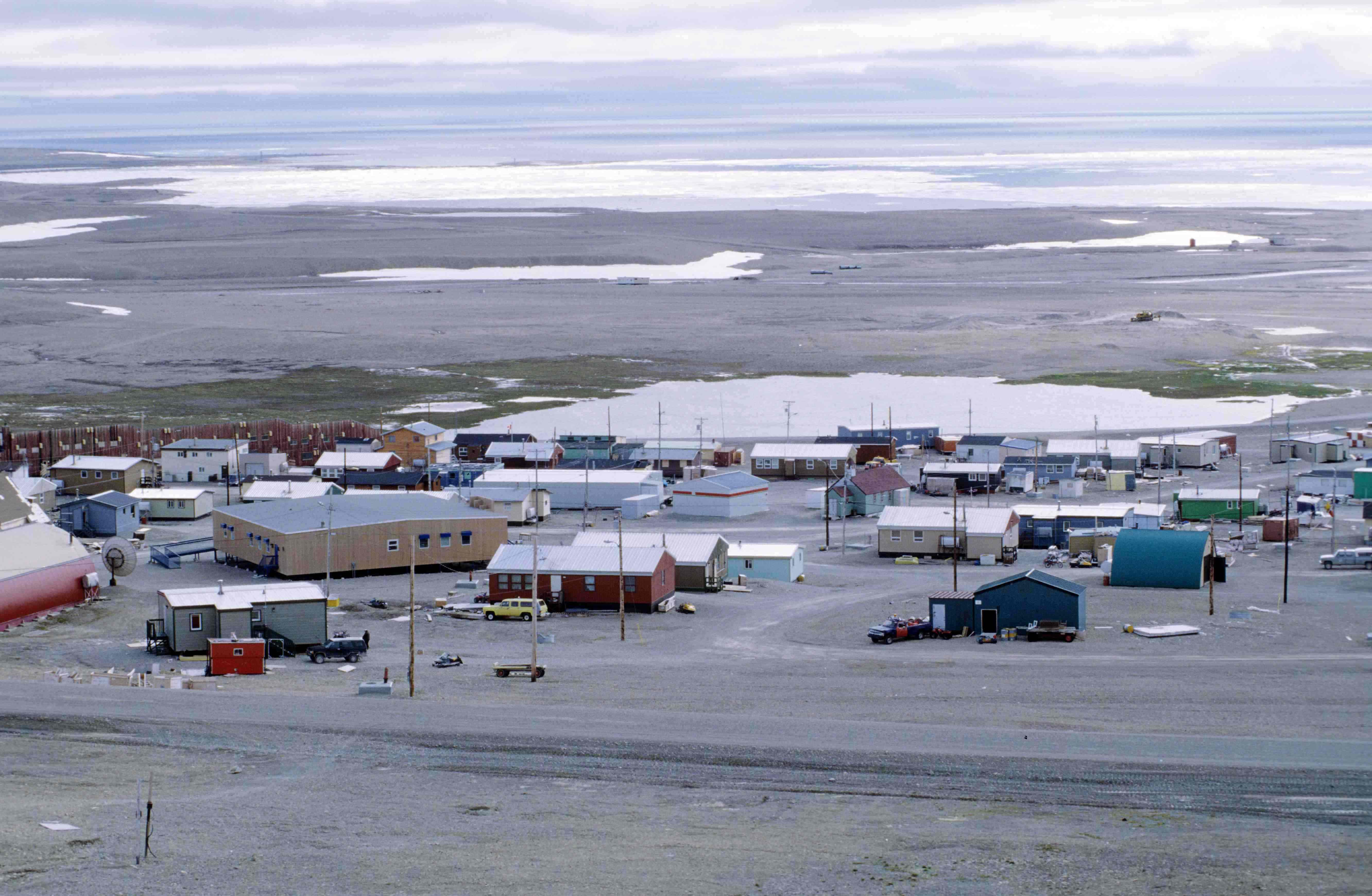
- Resolute in August 1997. Visible on the left is a long school building (brown).

- Seal

- Location within Nunavut Location within Canada
- Coordinates: 74°41′45″N 094°49′45″W
- Country: Canada
- Territory: Nunavut
- Region: Qikiqtaaluk
- Electoral district: Quttiktuq

Government
  - Type: Hamlet Council
  - Mayor: Aziz Kheraj
  - MLA: Steven Taqtu

Area (2021)
  - Total: 115.02 km^{2} (44.41 sq mi)
- Elevation: 66 m (217 ft)

Population (2021)
  - Total: 183
  - Density: 1.6/km^{2} (4.1/sq mi)
- Time zone: UTC−06:00 (CST)
  - Summer (DST): UTC−05:00 (CDT)
- Canadian Postal code: X0A 0V0
- Area code: 867

Resolute or Resolute Bay (Inuktitut: ᖃᐅᓱᐃᑦᑐᖅ, romanized: Qausuittuq, lit. 'place with no dawn') is an Inuit hamlet on Cornwallis Island in Nunavut, Canada. It is at the northern end of Resolute Bay and the Northwest Passage and is part of the Qikiqtaaluk Region.

== Geography ==
Resolute is one of Canada's northernmost communities and is second only to Grise Fiord on Ellesmere Island (Alert and Eureka are more northerly but are not considered towns; rather, military outposts and weather stations). It is also one of the coldest inhabited places in the world, with an average yearly temperature of −15.1 °C (4.8 °F). As in most other northern communities, the roads and most of the terrain are all gravel. It is also the closest transit location to Devon Island, the largest uninhabited island in the world, which contains the best-preserved crater on Earth – the Haughton impact crater, formed about 31 million years ago.

=== Climate ===
Resolute has a tundra climate or ET, a polar climate sub-type under the Köppen climate classification, with long cold winters and short cool summers. The average high for the year is −12.2 °C (10.0 °F) while the average low for the year is −17.9 °C (−0.2 °F). Resolute has a very dry climate with an average precipitation of 164.1 mm (6.46 in) a year, most of it falling as snow from September to November. The record high for Resolute is 20.1 °C (68.2 °F) on July 2, 2012 and the record low for Resolute is −52.2 °C (−62.0 °F) on January 7, 1966.

Resolute has never experienced an above-freezing temperature between October 20 and May 6.

Between around April 30 and August 13, Resolute experiences midnight sun; whilst between around November 7 and February 4 there is polar night. Between late November and mid-January, the sun is so low that there is not even civil twilight, with the only exception from complete darkness being a deeper-blue sky called nautical twilight at noon, but there is no true experience of 24 hours of pitch black darkness around noon. For about two weeks before and after the midnight sun in Resolute, the nights are still quite bright since it does not get any darker than civil twilight (this is the twilight where surrounding objects are still visible and outdoor activities can go on without the need for artificial lighting). Resolute, however, does not experience night (the phase of day) from about March 14 to September 29.

Resolute does experience thunderstorms during the summer, but they are typically rare in the region.

Climate data for Resolute (Resolute Bay Airport / Resolute CARS) WMO ID: 71924; coordinates 74°43′01″N 94°58′10″W; elevation: 67.7 m (222 ft); 1991–2020 normals, extremes 1947–present (Note: Composite data from Resolute CS: WMO ID: 71018; coordinates 74°42′57″N 94°58′59″W; elevation: 30.0 m (98.4 ft). Sun from 1981–2010 data)
Month	Jan	Feb	Mar	Apr	May	Jun	Jul	Aug	Sep	Oct	Nov	Dec	Year
Record high humidex	−0.8	−3.9	−2.8	0.0	5.6	18.8	20.4	15.0	8.9	1.4	−2.8	−4.1	20.4
Record high °C (°F)	−0.8 (30.6)	−3.9 (25.0)	−2.7 (27.1)	0.0 (32.0)	6.1 (43.0)	18.3 (64.9)	20.1 (68.2)	15.3 (59.5)	9.4 (48.9)	2.0 (35.6)	−2.8 (27.0)	−3.6 (25.5)	20.1 (68.2)
Mean daily maximum °C (°F)	−28.0 (−18.4)	−28.8 (−19.8)	−26.0 (−14.8)	−17.7 (0.1)	−7.2 (19.0)	2.8 (37.0)	7.7 (45.9)	4.6 (40.3)	−1.7 (28.9)	−9.4 (15.1)	−18.3 (−0.9)	−23.8 (−10.8)	−12.2 (10.0)
Daily mean °C (°F)	−31.4 (−24.5)	−32.1 (−25.8)	−29.4 (−20.9)	−21.2 (−6.2)	−10.1 (13.8)	0.5 (32.9)	4.9 (40.8)	2.4 (36.3)	−3.7 (25.3)	−12.2 (10.0)	−21.5 (−6.7)	−27.3 (−17.1)	−15.1 (4.8)
Mean daily minimum °C (°F)	−34.6 (−30.3)	−35.3 (−31.5)	−32.8 (−27.0)	−24.6 (−12.3)	−12.9 (8.8)	−1.7 (28.9)	2.0 (35.6)	0.2 (32.4)	−5.6 (21.9)	−15.0 (5.0)	−24.4 (−11.9)	−30.6 (−23.1)	−17.9 (−0.2)
Record low °C (°F)	−52.2 (−62.0)	−52.0 (−61.6)	−51.7 (−61.1)	−42.1 (−43.8)	−29.4 (−20.9)	−16.7 (1.9)	−3.1 (26.4)	−9.3 (15.3)	−20.6 (−5.1)	−37.3 (−35.1)	−42.8 (−45.0)	−46.1 (−51.0)	−52.2 (−62.0)
Record low wind chill	−72.0	−69.6	−69.9	−60.5	−41.5	−27.1	−9.8	−17.1	−32.4	−57.1	−60.3	−63.8	−72.0
Average precipitation mm (inches)	4.9 (0.19)	4.4 (0.17)	7.4 (0.29)	8.3 (0.33)	8.6 (0.34)	15.7 (0.62)	29.3 (1.15)	32.6 (1.28)	19.0 (0.75)	15.1 (0.59)	12.0 (0.47)	6.7 (0.26)	164.1 (6.46)
Average rainfall mm (inches)	0.0 (0.0)	0.0 (0.0)	0.0 (0.0)	0.1 (0.00)	0.6 (0.02)	8.9 (0.35)	25.1 (0.99)	22.1 (0.87)	3.7 (0.15)	0.1 (0.00)	0.0 (0.0)	0.0 (0.0)	60.5 (2.38)
Average snowfall cm (inches)	5.2 (2.0)	4.3 (1.7)	7.4 (2.9)	6.3 (2.5)	8.9 (3.5)	7.4 (2.9)	3.4 (1.3)	8.0 (3.1)	16.2 (6.4)	18.4 (7.2)	12.7 (5.0)	7.1 (2.8)	105.3 (41.5)
Average precipitation days (≥ 0.2 mm)	7.2	6.9	8.5	7.2	8.5	7.8	11.1	13.7	12.4	13.1	11.0	8.3	115.6
Average rainy days (≥ 0.2 mm)	0.0	0.0	0.0	0.04	0.44	4.1	9.8	8.6	2.1	0.25	0.0	0.0	25.4
Average snowy days (≥ 0.2 cm)	6.9	6.6	7.9	6.5	8.1	5.2	2.4	6.0	11.0	13.3	10.6	8.1	92.5
Average relative humidity (%) (at 1500 LST)	66.0	65.5	66.7	69.6	80.8	83.1	80.5	85.2	87.8	84.7	73.8	68.1	76.0
Mean monthly sunshine hours	—	—	132.2	291.7	307.9	298.1	299.4	138.4	58.9	30.3	0.7	—	—
Percentage possible sunshine	—	—	37.2	53.6	41.4	41.4	40.2	20.8	14.0	12.4	3.8	—	—
Source: Environment and Climate Change Canada (sun 1981–2010)

== History ==
Resolute Bay, Nunavut, 2002

Resolute at Sundown, 2002

Stone Cairn, 2002

The area shows evidence of being occupied sporadically by the Dorset culture (Tuniit) and later the Thule people from as early as 1500 BCE until 1000 CE. However, modern Inuit did not occupy or use the area until the 1953 High Arctic relocation.

In 1947, Canada and the United States built a weather station, Resolute Weather Station, and an airstrip as part of the Joint Arctic Weather Stations: known today as the High Arctic Weather Stations. This was followed in 1949 by a Royal Canadian Air Force base, RCAF Station Resolute Bay. At that time, the population was made up of military personnel and specialists, such as meteorologists, from the south. Today, the base serves as one of the potential starting points for Arctic research and access to both the North Pole and the north magnetic pole.

Named after the Arctic exploration vessel HMS Resolute, the community of Resolute got its start in 1953 as part of the High Arctic relocation. Efforts to assert Canadian sovereignty in the High Arctic during the Cold War, because of the area's strategic geopolitical position, led the Government of Canada to forcibly relocate Inuit from Nunavik (northern Quebec) to Resolute (and to Grise Fiord).

The first group of people, which included one Royal Canadian Mounted Police officer, Ross Gibson, who was also to become the community's first teacher, were relocated in 1953, along with a second group in 1955, from Inukjuak (then known as Port Harrison), Quebec, and from Pond Inlet, Nunavut (then the Northwest Territories). They were promised homes and game to hunt, but the relocated people discovered no buildings and very little familiar wildlife. They also had to endure weeks of 24-hour darkness during the winter, and 24-hour sunlight during the summer: something that does not occur in northern Quebec.

They were told that they would be returned home after "two or three years" if they wished. However, this offer was later withdrawn as it would have damaged Canada's claims to sovereignty in the area and the Inuit were forced to stay. Eventually, the Inuit learned the local beluga whale migration routes and were able to survive in the area, hunting over a range of 18,000 km^{2} (6,900 sq mi) each year.

In 1993, the Canadian government held hearings to investigate the relocation program, and the following year the Royal Commission on Aboriginal Peoples issued a report entitled The High Arctic Relocation: A Report on the 1953–55 Relocation. The government paid $10 million CAD to the survivors and their families and gave a formal apology in 2008.

The community was originally built 5 km (3.1 mi) from the base but, by the 1970s, the number of research people arriving in Resolute was causing problems. Between 1974 and 1975 the community was moved to a location allowing better municipal services, but poorly-sited for hunting purposes.

== Demographics ==
In the 2021 Canadian census conducted by Statistics Canada, Resolute had a population of 183 living in 66 of its 89 total private dwellings, a change of −7.6% from its 2016 population of 198. With a land area of 115.02 km^{2} (44.41 sq mi), it had a population density of 1.6/km^{2} (4.1/sq mi) in 2021.

Federal census population history of Resolute

Year	Pop.	±%
1976	223	—
1981	168	−24.7%
1986	184	+9.5%
1991	171	−7.1%
1996	198	+15.8%

Year	Pop.	±%
2001	215	+8.6%
2006	229	+6.5%
2011	214	−6.6%
2016	198	−7.5%
2021	183	−7.6%

Source: Statistics Canada

== Economy ==
Contrary to popular stereotypes, people in this remote community have a low unemployment rate. Most citizens are employed at least part of the year; however, with 2010s changes to United States (US) policy on polar bear hunting, the local economy is at risk as many Inuit cater to US hunters seeking polar bear trophies.

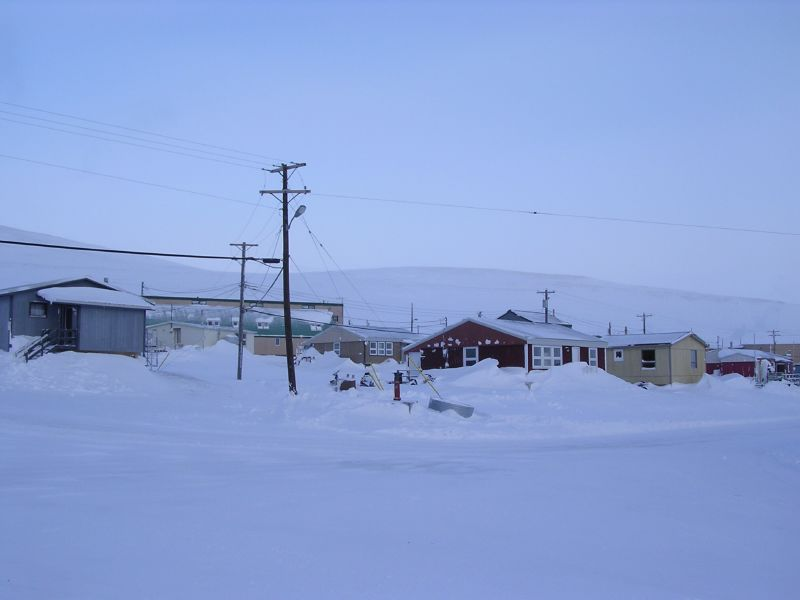
The community of Resolute

Besides hunting guides and hotels Resolute has mixed and small sized employers:

- Resolute Bay School
- Hamlet of Resolute Council
- RCMP Resolute Detachment
- Resolute Bay Airport
- Tudjaat Co-op store

== Facilities ==
The Tudjaat Co-op, part of the Arctic Co-operatives, runs a grocery/retail store.

The town has two hotels – South Camp Inn, and the Airport Hotel (Narwhal), which are operated by Atco Frontec Ltd – which have fewer than 60 rooms each, and several self contained apartments. The hotels are also equipped with WiFi internet and gym spaces. Other facilities include a Royal Canadian Mounted Police Detachment, a school (which provides education from kindergarten to Grade 12) and a gym. There is also a remote campus of Nunavut Arctic College.

There is the Resolute Bay Health Centre/Nursing Station, staffed by nurses with a doctor visiting several times a year. Patients may be flown to the Qikiqtani General Hospital in Iqaluit or Ottawa.

Unlike a lot of Arctic communities there is only one church, the Resolute Bay Anglican Church.

=== Broadband communications ===
The community has been served by the Qiniq network since 2005. The Qiniq network is designed and operated by SSi Canada. In 2017, the network was upgraded to 4G LTE technology, and 2G-GSM for mobile voice.

=== Military presence ===
On August 8, 2007, CBC News reported that Canadian Armed Forces documents showed plans to build an army training centre in the community along with a $60 million deep water port at Nanisivik 370 km (230 mi) to the southeast.

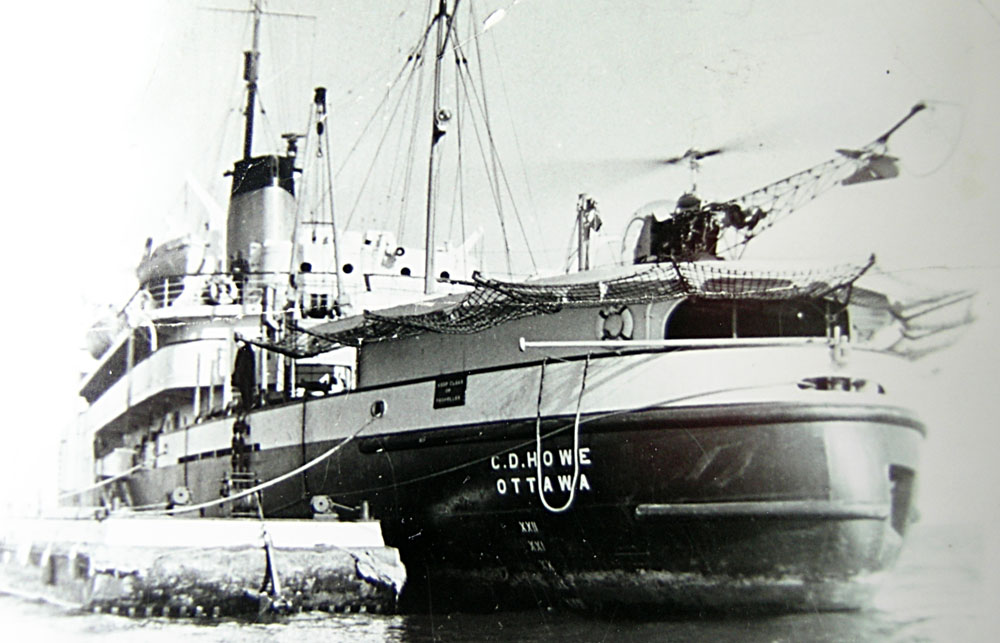
The ship, C. D. Howe, that brought the first people to Resolute, 1955

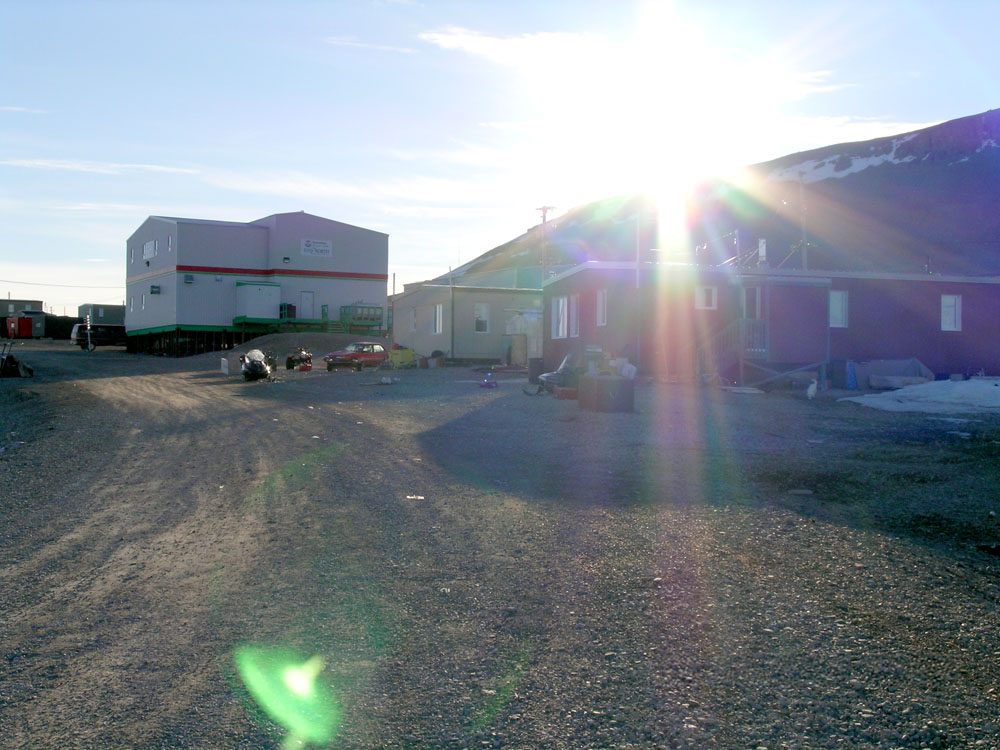
Tadjaat Coop Hotel under the midnight sun, July 2004

On August 10, 2007, then-Prime Minister, Stephen Harper, announced the construction of a pair of multimillion-dollar military facilities within the contested waters of Canada's Arctic territory. The facilities consist of a new army training centre at Resolute, and a deep-sea port at Nanisivik Naval Facility. A statement issued by the Prime Minister said, "The Training Centre will be a year-round multi-purpose facility supporting Arctic training and operations, accommodating up to 100 personnel. Training equipment and vehicles stationed at the site will also provide an increased capability and faster response time in support of regional military or civilian emergency operations."

On August 16, 2013, the Arctic Training Facility opened in Resolute.

On February 23, 2016, in response to an increase in Russian military presence in the Arctic, it was announced that the military training facility would be expanded. This would include, "more storage, more capacity to get more equipment in, prepositioning more equipment so we don't spend a fortune on airlift or chartered aircraft", said Lieutenant-colonel Luc St-Denis. Incinerators were also said to be proposed to minimize the environmental impact on the area.

=== Government of Canada facilities ===
The government of Canada has several buildings around the community; namely, the Martin Bergmann Complex, named for Martin Bergmann, which houses the Polar Continental Shelf Program from Natural Resources Canada, enabling Arctic Science Research.

The Polar Continental Shelf Project (PCSP), a Government of Canada organization created in 1958. The centre may host up to 40 scientists as a starting location before they go to their field research. The PCSP provides researchers with efficient and safe logistics and, as part of the Arctic policy of Canada, strengthens Canadian sovereignty in the area. It brings together scientists from diverse organizations, including many Geological Survey of Canada researchers, for interdisciplinary studies of the Canadian Arctic.

== Transportation ==
Although not as busy as it once was, Resolute Bay Airport is still the core of the area, serving as an aviation hub for exploration in the region and connected by direct service to Iqaluit. On August 20, 2011, First Air Flight 6560 crashed into a hill while attempting to land at the airport. Of the fifteen people on board the Boeing 737-200 jet, twelve were killed and the remaining three were severely injured.

Within the community, most travel is by snowmobile and walking. Cars are limited. There are no taxis or public transit, but hotels offer shuttle service.

== Notable people ==
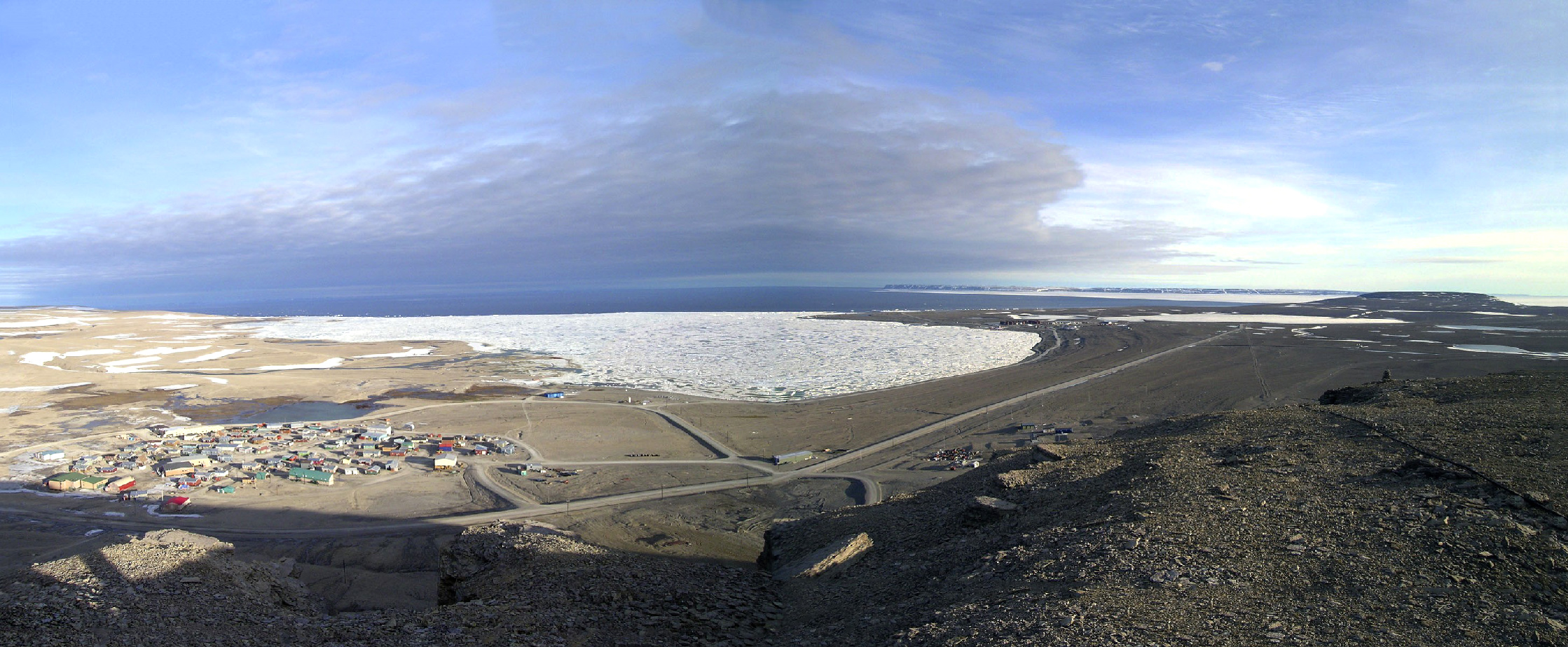
Resolute area, 2004

Joseph Idlout, grandfather of singer Lucie Idlout and father of Leah Idlout, the community's second teacher, moved to Resolute in 1955 from Pond Inlet. Idlout, an Inuk hunter who was the subject of two National Film Board of Canada documentaries: Land of the Long Day, filmed in 1952 in Pond Inlet, and Between Two Worlds in 1990. He was for a time one of the most well-known Inuit and was shown on the back of the Canadian two-dollar bill. Celina Kalluk, notable performer of Inuit throat singing and children's author, was born here.

== Racing ==
Resolute is the starting point for both the Polar Race and the Polar Challenge, in which teams race the 350 nmi (650 km; 400 mi) to the north magnetic pole.

In 2007, the British television show Top Gear aired the Top Gear: Polar Special, which embarked from Resolute. The show was framed as a race to the north magnetic pole between hosts Jeremy Clarkson and James May driving a 2007 Toyota Hilux 3.0 litre diesel versus a team of sled dogs driven by American explorer Matty McNair with host Richard Hammond riding along. Clarkson and May successfully reached their destination, becoming the first in history to drive to the north magnetic pole; Hammond and McNair did not finish.

== See also ==
- List of municipalities in Nunavut
