= Circles of latitude between the 75th parallel north and the 80th parallel north =

Circles of latitude

Following are circles of latitude between the 75th parallel north and the 80th parallel north:

== 76th parallel north ==
76th parallel north (interactive map)

The 76th parallel north is a circle of latitude that is 76 degrees north of the Earth's equatorial plane, in the Arctic. It crosses the Atlantic Ocean, Europe, Asia, the Arctic Ocean and North America.

At this latitude the sun is visible for 24 hours, 0 minutes during the summer solstice and nautical twilight during the winter solstice.

=== Around the world ===
Starting at the Prime Meridian and heading eastwards, the parallel 76° north passes through:

Coordinates	Country, territory or sea	Notes
76°0′N 0°0′E	Atlantic Ocean	Greenland Sea; Norwegian Sea
76°0′N 17°14′E	Barents Sea	
76°0′N 60°19′E	Russia	Novaya Zemlya - Severny Island
76°0′N 66°31′E	Kara Sea	Passing just north of the Izvestiy TSIK Islands, Russia
76°0′N 92°57′E	Russia	Taymyr Peninsula
76°0′N 113°32′E	Laptev Sea	
76°0′N 137°54′E	Russia	New Siberian Islands - Kotelny Island
76°0′N 139°34′E	East Siberian Sea	
76°0′N 140°58′E	Russia	New Siberian Islands - Bunge Land and Faddeyevsky Island
76°0′N 142°8′E	East Siberian Sea	Passing just south of Zhokhov Island, Russia
76°0′N 161°24′E	Arctic Ocean	
76°0′N 122°35′W	Canada	Northwest Territories - Prince Patrick Island
76°0′N 119°27′W	Crozier Channel	
76°0′N 118°6′W	Canada	Northwest Territories - Eglinton Island
76°0′N 117°33′W	Kellett Strait	
76°0′N 116°26′W	Canada	Northwest Territories - Melville Island
76°0′N 111°58′W	Hecla and Griper Bay	
76°0′N 109°29′W	Canada	Nunavut - Melville Island
76°0′N 107°35′W	Weatherall Bay	
76°0′N 106°44′W	Canada	Nunavut - Melville Island
76°0′N 105°50′W	Byam Martin Channel	
76°0′N 103°22′W	Canada	Nunavut - Massey Island
76°0′N 102°27′W	Erskine Inlet	Passing just north of Alexander Island, Nunavut, Canada
76°0′N 101°44′W	Canada	Nunavut - Bathurst Island, passing through the May Inlet
76°0′N 97°37′W	Queens Channel	Passing just north of Baring Island, Nunavut, Canada; Passing just south of Dundas Island and Margaret Island, Nunavut, Canada
76°0′N 94°35′W	Wellington Channel	Passing just north of Baillie-Hamilton Island, Nunavut, Canada
76°0′N 92°33′W	Canada	Nunavut - Devon Island
76°0′N 89°55′W	Jones Sound	
76°0′N 79°23′W	Canada	Nunavut - Coburg Island
76°0′N 79°3′W	Baffin Bay	
76°0′N 67°15′W	Greenland	Crimson Cliffs near Cape York
76°0′N 66°37′W	Melville Bay	
76°0′N 59°45′W	Greenland	King Oscar Glacier
76°0′N 19°54′W	Dove Bay	
76°0′N 18°34′W	Greenland	Store Koldewey Island
76°0′N 18°28′W	Atlantic Ocean	Greenland Sea

== 77th parallel north ==
77th parallel north (interactive map)

The 77th parallel north is a circle of latitude that is 77 degrees north of the Earth's equatorial plane, in the Arctic. It crosses the Atlantic Ocean, Europe, Asia, the Arctic Ocean and North America. It is the northernmost integral parallel that passes through continental mainland (namely the Taymyr Peninsula of Siberia).

At this latitude the sun is visible for 24 hours, 0 minutes during the summer solstice and nautical twilight during the winter solstice.

=== Around the world ===
Starting at the Prime Meridian and heading eastwards, the parallel 77° north passes through:

Coordinates	Country, territory or sea	Notes
77°0′N 0°0′E	Atlantic Ocean	Greenland Sea
77°0′N 16°30′E	Norway	Svalbard - island of Spitsbergen
77°0′N 17°15′E	Barents Sea	
77°0′N 67°40′E	Russia	Novaya Zemlya - Severny Island (northernmost point)
77°0′N 67°57′E	Kara Sea	
77°0′N 88°50′E	Russia	Slozhnyy Island
77°0′N 88°53′E	Kara Sea	
77°0′N 95°21′E	Russia	Russkiy Island
77°0′N 96°15′E	Kara Sea	
77°0′N 101°20′E	Russia	Taymyr Peninsula
77°0′N 107°18′E	Laptev Sea	
77°0′N 107°57′E	Russia	Faddey Islands
77°0′N 108°4′E	Laptev Sea	
77°0′N 132°2′E	Arctic Ocean	
77°0′N 154°16′E	East Siberian Sea	Passing just south of Henrietta Island, Russia
77°0′N 157°10′E	Arctic Ocean	
77°0′N 120°4′W	Canada	Northwest Territories - Prince Patrick Island
77°0′N 116°0′W	Moore Bay	
77°0′N 115°40′W	Unnamed waterbody	Passing just north of Emerald Isle, Northwest Territories, Canada; Passing just south of Fitzwilliam Owen Island, Northwest Territories, Canada; Passing just south of Eight Bears Island, Northwest Territories, Canada
77°0′N 111°33′W	Hazen Strait	Passing just north of Vesey Hamilton Island, Nunavut, Canada
77°0′N 109°0′W	Byam Martin Channel	
77°0′N 104°52′W	Desbarats Strait	Passing just south of the Findlay Group, Nunavut, Canada
77°0′N 103°38′W	Unnamed waterbody	
77°0′N 97°25′W	Canada	Nunavut - Crescent Island
77°0′N 97°8′W	Napier Bay	
77°0′N 96°17′W	Canada	Nunavut - Devon Island
77°0′N 95°13′W	Norwegian Bay	
77°0′N 88°43′W	Canada	Nunavut - Ellesmere Island
77°0′N 79°15′W	Baffin Bay	Smith Bay
77°0′N 78°22′W	Canada	Nunavut - Ellesmere Island
77°0′N 78°4′W	Baffin Bay	
77°0′N 71°19′W	Greenland	Steensby Land
77°0′N 18°12′W	Greenland	Germania Land
77°0′N 18°14′W	Atlantic Ocean	Greenland Sea

== 78th parallel north ==
78th parallel north (interactive map)

The 78th parallel north is a circle of latitude that is 78 degrees north of the Earth's equatorial plane, in the Arctic. It crosses the Atlantic Ocean, Europe, Asia, the Arctic Ocean and North America. It is the southernmost integral parallel north that does not pass through any continental mainland (being slightly to the north of Cape Chelyuskin).

At this latitude the sun is visible for 24 hours, 0 minutes during the summer solstice and nautical twilight during the winter solstice.

=== Around the world ===
Starting at the Prime Meridian and heading eastwards, the parallel 78° north passes through:

Coordinates	Country, territory or sea	Notes
78°0′N 0°0′E	Atlantic Ocean	Greenland Sea
78°0′N 13°39′E	Norway	Svalbard - island of Spitsbergen
78°0′N 18°25′E	Storfjorden	
78°0′N 21°8′E	Norway	Svalbard - island of Edgeøya
78°0′N 23°16′E	Barents Sea	
78°0′N 67°48′E	Kara Sea	
78°0′N 99°35′E	Russia	Severnaya Zemlya - Bolshevik Island
78°0′N 100°23′E	Kara Sea	
78°0′N 103°24′E	Laptev Sea	Passing just south of Maly Taymyr Island, Russia
78°0′N 123°15′E	Arctic Ocean	
78°0′N 114°43′W	Canada	Northwest Territories - Brock Island
78°0′N 114°19′W	Wilkins Strait	
78°0′N 112°25′W	Canada	Northwest Territories - Mackenzie King Island; Nunavut - Mackenzie King Island
78°0′N 109°36′W	Prince Gustav Adolf Sea	
78°0′N 105°19′W	Maclean Strait	
78°0′N 102°51′W	Danish Strait	Passing just north of King Christian Island, Nunavut, Canada
78°0′N 100°47′W	Canada	Nunavut - Ellef Ringnes Island
78°0′N 99°2′W	Hassel Sound	
78°0′N 97°28′W	Canada	Nunavut - Amund Ringnes Island
78°0′N 95°1′W	Norwegian Bay	
78°0′N 87°50′W	Baumann Fiord	
78°0′N 85°24′W	Canada	Nunavut - Ellesmere Island
78°0′N 75°48′W	Nares Strait	
78°0′N 72°16′W	Greenland	Kavigarssuk
78°0′N 24°0′W	Greenland	Alabama Nunatak
78°0′N 18°52′W	Atlantic Ocean	Greenland Sea

== 79th parallel north ==
79th parallel north (interactive map)

The 79th parallel north is the circle of latitude located 79 degrees north of the Earth's equatorial plane, in the Arctic. It crosses the Atlantic Ocean, Europe, Asia, the Arctic Ocean and North America.

At this latitude the sun is visible for 24 hours, 0 minutes during the summer solstice and astronomical twilight during the winter solstice.

=== Around the world ===
Starting at the Prime Meridian and heading eastwards, the parallel 79° north passes through:

Coordinates	Country, territory or sea	Notes
79°0′N 0°0′E	Atlantic Ocean	Greenland Sea
79°0′N 12°5′E	Norway	Svalbard - island of Spitsbergen
79°0′N 20°11′E	Barents Sea	Passing just north of the island of Kongsøya, Svalbard, Norway
79°0′N 30°4′E	Norway	Svalbard - island of Abeløya
79°0′N 30°19′E	Barents Sea	
79°0′N 67°0′E	Kara Sea	
79°0′N 95°44′E	Russia	Severnaya Zemlya - October Revolution Island
79°0′N 99°58′E	Laptev Sea	
79°0′N 101°6′E	Russia	Severnaya Zemlya - Bolshevik Island
79°0′N 104°5′E	Laptev Sea	
79°0′N 114°28′E	Arctic Ocean	
79°0′N 104°40′W	Canada	Nunavut - Ellef Ringnes Island
79°0′N 101°21′W	Peary Channel	
79°0′N 94°12′W	Canada	Nunavut - Axel Heiberg Island, Stor Island and Ellesmere Island
79°0′N 76°7′W	Nares Strait	
79°0′N 68°48′W	Greenland	
79°0′N 19°52′W	Atlantic Ocean	Greenland Sea
79°0′N 68°43′W	Greenland	North of Inuarfissuaq (Cap Russel)
79°0′N 17°57′W	Greenland	Main island of Norske Islands
79°0′N 17°40′W	Atlantic Ocean	Greenland Sea

== 80th parallel north ==
80th parallel north (interactive map)

The 80th parallel north is a circle of latitude that is 80 degrees north of the Earth's equatorial plane, and 10 degrees (690 miles / 1100 kilometers) south of the North Pole, in the Arctic. It crosses the Atlantic Ocean, Europe, Asia, the Arctic Ocean, and North America.

At this latitude the sun is visible for 24 hours, 0 minutes during the summer solstice and astronomical twilight during the winter solstice.

This latitude is the boundary between the Arctic and High Arctic zones of Canada's National Topographic System, at which the longitude span of each map sheet doubles as one crosses this latitude going north.

=== Around the world ===
Starting at the Prime Meridian and heading eastwards, the parallel 80° north passes through:

Coordinates	Country, territory or sea	Notes
80°0′N 0°0′E	Atlantic Ocean	Greenland Sea
80°0′N 15°58′E	Norway	Svalbard - island of Spitsbergen
80°0′N 16°33′E	Atlantic Ocean	Hinlopen Strait
80°0′N 18°38′E	Norway	Svalbard - island of Nordaustlandet
80°0′N 27°10′E	Barents Sea	Passing just south of the islands of Storøya and Kvitøya, Svalbard, Norway; Passing just south of Victoria Island, Russia
80°0′N 50°34′E	Russia	Franz Josef Land - Northbrook Island
80°0′N 51°12′E	Barents Sea	
80°0′N 58°47′E	Russia	Franz Josef Land - Salm Island
80°0′N 60°0′E	Barents Sea	
80°0′N 66°13′E	Kara Sea	
80°0′N 91°18′E	Russia	Severnaya Zemlya - Pioneer Island and Matusevich Fjord, October Revolution Island
80°0′N 99°20′E	Laptev Sea	
80°0′N 105°40′E	Arctic Ocean	
80°0′N 100°9′W	Canada	Nunavut - Meighen Island
80°0′N 98°45′W	Sverdrup Channel	
80°0′N 96°37′W	Canada	Nunavut - Axel Heiberg Island
80°0′N 87°9′W	Eureka Sound	
80°0′N 86°12′W	Canada	Nunavut - Fosheim Peninsula, Ellesmere Island
80°0′N 82°44′W	Cañon Fiord	
80°0′N 82°1′W	Canada	Nunavut - Ellesmere Island
80°0′N 70°40′W	Nares Strait	
80°0′N 65°2′W	Greenland	Cape Clay
80°0′N 17°14′W	Greenland	Hovgaard Island
80°0′N 17°9′W	Atlantic Ocean	Greenland Sea

== See also ==
- Circles of latitude between the 70th parallel north and the 75th parallel north
- Circles of latitude between the 80th parallel north and the 85th parallel north
