= 105th meridian west =

Line of longitude

105th meridian west

The meridian 105° west of Greenwich is a line of longitude that extends from the North Pole across the Arctic Ocean, North America, the Pacific Ocean, the Southern Ocean, and Antarctica to the South Pole.

The 105th meridian west forms a great circle with the 75th meridian east.

It serves as the reference meridian for the seventh time zone west of Greenwich, known as UTC-07 or the Mountain Time Zone in North America.

In the United States, Interstate Highway I-25 roughly parallels the meridian from Douglas, Wyoming to Las Vegas, New Mexico, and from Wellington, Colorado to the Prospect Road interchange (in Fort Collins, Colorado), I-25 happens to be almost exactly aligned along the 105th meridian west. The meridian bisects Denver, Colorado, passing through Denver Union Station. Throughout the Denver metro area, Kalamath Street is the road that most closely corresponds to the 105th meridian.

== From Pole to Pole ==
Starting at the North Pole and heading south to the South Pole, the 105th meridian west passes through:

Co-ordinates	Country, territory or sea	Notes
90°0′N 105°0′W	Arctic Ocean	
79°19′N 105°0′W	Canada	Nunavut — Ellef Ringnes Island
79°2′N 105°0′W	Arctic Ocean	
78°31′N 105°0′W	Canada	Nunavut — Ellef Ringnes Island
78°29′N 105°0′W	Maclean Strait	
77°32′N 105°0′W	Canada	Nunavut — Lougheed Island
77°10′N 105°0′W	Byam Martin Channel	
75°35′N 105°0′W	Byam Channel	Passing just west of Byam Martin Island, Nunavut, Canada (at 75°7′N 104°54′W)
75°5′N 105°0′W	Parry Channel	Viscount Melville Sound
73°43′N 105°0′W	Canada	Nunavut — Stefansson Island
73°0′N 105°0′W	M'Clintock Channel	
72°12′N 105°0′W	Canada	Nunavut — Victoria Island
68°53′N 105°0′W	Queen Maud Gulf	
68°35′N 105°0′W	Canada	Nunavut — Melbourne Island and the mainland Northwest Territories — from 64°29′N 105°0′W; Saskatchewan — from 60°0′N 105°0′W
49°0′N 105°0′W	United States	Montana; Wyoming — from 45°0′N 105°0′W; Colorado — from 41°0′N 105°0′W, passing through Denver (at 39°45′N 105°0′W); New Mexico — from 37°0′N 105°0′W; Texas — from 32°0′N 105°0′W
30°40′N 105°0′W	Mexico	Chihuahua; Durango — from 26°30′N 105°0′W; Nayarit — from 22°56′N 105°0′W; Jalisco — from 20°55′N 105°0′W
19°21′N 105°0′W	Pacific Ocean	Passing just east of Isla Salas y Gómez, Chile (at 26°28′S 105°21′W)
60°0′S 105°0′W	Southern Ocean	
74°41′S 105°0′W	Antarctica	Unclaimed territory

== See also ==
- 104th meridian west
- 106th meridian west
