= 104th meridian west =

Line of longitude

104th meridian west

The meridian 104° west of Greenwich is a line of longitude that extends from the North Pole across the Arctic Ocean, North America, the Pacific Ocean, the Southern Ocean, and Antarctica to the South Pole.

The 104th meridian west forms a great circle with the 76th meridian east.

In the United States, the western boundaries of North Dakota, South Dakota, and Nebraska and the eastern boundaries of Montana and Wyoming lie on the meridian 27° west of Washington, which is a couple of miles west of the meridian 104° west of Greenwich. In Colorado, the meridian 104° west of Greenwich roughly defines the eastern extent of the region of high plains protected by the Southern Rocky Mountains.

== From Pole to Pole ==
Starting at the North Pole and heading south to the South Pole, the 104th meridian west passes through:

Co-ordinates	Country, territory or sea	Notes
90°0′N 104°0′W	Arctic Ocean	
79°22′N 104°0′W	Canada	Nunavut — Ellef Ringnes Island
78°14′N 104°0′W	Maclean Strait	
77°9′N 104°0′W	Canada	Nunavut — Edmund Walker Island
77°7′N 104°0′W	Desbarats Strait	
76°40′N 104°0′W	Canada	Nunavut — Cameron Island and Île Vanier
76°2′N 104°0′W	Byam Martin Channel	Passing just west of Massey Island, Nunavut, Canada (at 75°56′N 103°55′W); Passing just west of Île Marc, Nunavut, Canada (at 75°52′N 103°48′W)
75°40′N 104°0′W	Austin Channel	
75°24′N 104°0′W	Canada	Nunavut — Byam Martin Island
75°3′N 104°0′W	Parry Channel	Viscount Melville Sound
73°25′N 104°0′W	M'Clintock Channel	
70°46′N 104°0′W	Canada	Nunavut — Victoria Island
68°52′N 104°0′W	Queen Maud Gulf	
68°3′N 104°0′W	Canada	Nunavut; Northwest Territories — from 64°24′N 104°0′W; Saskatchewan — from 60°0′N 104°0′W
49°0′N 104°0′W	United States	North Dakota; South Dakota — from 45°56′N 104°0′W; Nebraska — from 43°0′N 104°0′W; Colorado — from 41°0′N 104°0′W; New Mexico — from 37°0′N 104°0′W; Texas — from 32°0′N 104°0′W
29°18′N 104°0′W	Mexico	Chihuahua; Durango — from 26°46′N 104°0′W; Zacatecas — from 23°31′N 104°0′W; Jalisco — from 22°21′N 104°0′W; Nayarit — from 21°27′N 104°0′W; Jalisco — from 21°15′N 104°0′W; Colima — from 19°26′N 104°0′W
18°53′N 104°0′W	Pacific Ocean	
60°0′S 104°0′W	Southern Ocean	
74°44′S 104°0′W	Antarctica	Unclaimed territory

== See also ==
- 103rd meridian west
- 105th meridian west
