= 109th meridian west =

Line of longitude

109th meridian west

The meridian 109° west of Greenwich is a line of longitude that extends from the North Pole across the Arctic Ocean, North America, the Pacific Ocean, the Southern Ocean, and Antarctica to the South Pole.

The 109th meridian west forms a great circle with the 71st meridian east.

In the United States, the western boundaries of Colorado and New Mexico and the eastern boundaries of Utah and Arizona lie on the 32nd meridian west from Washington, which is approximately 3 minutes of longitude west of the 109th meridian west of Greenwich, or approximately 2.5 mi (4.0 km).

== From pole to pole ==
Starting at the North Pole and heading south to the South Pole, the 109th meridian west passes through:

Co-ordinates	Country, territory or sea	Notes
90°0′N 109°0′W	Arctic Ocean	Passing just east of Borden Island, Nunavut, Canada (at 78°28′N 109°13′W); Passing just east of Vesey Hamilton Island, Nunavut, Canada (at 76°54′N 109°2′W)
76°49′N 109°0′W	Canada	Nunavut — Melville Island
75°53′N 109°0′W	Sabine Bay	
75°29′N 109°0′W	Canada	
74°59′N 109°0′W	Parry Channel	Viscount Melville Sound
72°46′N 109°0′W	Canada	Nunavut — Victoria Island
68°44′N 109°0′W	Dease Strait	
68°19′N 109°0′W	Bathurst Inlet	
68°0′N 109°0′W	Canada	Nunavut — Lewes Island, the Stockport Islands and the mainland Northwest Territories — from 64°48′N 109°13′W, passing through the Great Slave Lake; Saskatchewan — from 60°0′N 109°13′W, passing through Lake Athabasca
49°0′N 109°0′W	United States	Montana; Wyoming — from 45°0′N 109°13′W; Colorado — from 41°0′N 109°13′W; New Mexico — from 37°0′N 109°13′W
31°20′N 109°0′W	Mexico	Sonora; Sonora / Chihuahua border — from 28°17′N 109°13′W; Sonora — from 28°0′N 109°13′W; Sinaloa — from 26°26′N 109°13′W, passing through Los Mochis
25°26′N 109°0′W	Pacific Ocean	Passing just east of Clipperton Island (an overseas possession of France, at 10°17′N 109°12′W); Passing just east of Easter Island, Chile (at 27°6′S 109°14′W)
60°0′S 109°0′W	Southern Ocean	
73°29′S 109°0′W	Antarctica	Unclaimed territory

== See also ==
- 108th meridian west
- 110th meridian west
