= 108th meridian west =

Line of longitude

108th meridian west (interactive map)

The meridian 108° west of Greenwich is a line of longitude that extends from the North Pole across the Arctic Ocean, North America, the Pacific Ocean, the Southern Ocean, and Antarctica to the South Pole.

The 108th meridian west forms a great circle with the 72nd meridian east.

== From Pole to Pole ==
Starting at the North Pole and heading south to the South Pole, the 108th meridian west passes through:

Co-ordinates	Country, territory or sea	Notes
90°0′N 108°0′W	Arctic Ocean	
77°43′N 108°0′W	Byam Martin Channel	
76°4′N 108°0′W	Canada	Nunavut — Melville Island
74°56′N 108°0′W	Parry Channel	Viscount Melville Sound
73°36′N 108°0′W	Canada	Nunavut — Kilian Island
73°34′N 108°0′W	Parry Channel	Viscount Melville Sound
73°21′N 108°0′W	Canada	Nunavut — Victoria Island
72°42′N 108°0′W	Hadley Bay	
71°41′N 108°0′W	Canada	Nunavut — Victoria Island
68°56′N 108°0′W	Dease Strait	
68°38′N 108°0′W	Canada	Nunavut — the Kent Peninsula (mainland)
68°7′N 108°0′W	Melville Sound	
67°48′N 108°0′W	Canada	Nunavut — the Barry Islands, the Banks Peninsula (mainland), the Young Islands, and the mainland Northwest Territories — from 64°43′N 108°0′W; Saskatchewan — from 60°0′N 108°0′W, passing through Lake Athabasca
49°0′N 108°0′W	United States	Montana; Wyoming — from 45°0′N 108°0′W; Colorado — from 41°0′N 108°0′W; New Mexico — from 37°0′N 108°0′W
31°47′N 108°0′W	Mexico	Chihuahua; Sinaloa — from 26°55′N 108°0′W
24°39′N 108°0′W	Pacific Ocean	
60°0′S 108°0′W	Southern Ocean	
73°52′S 108°0′W	Antarctica	Unclaimed territory

== See also ==
- 107th meridian west
- 109th meridian west
