= 106th meridian west =

Line of longitude

106th meridian west

The meridian 106° west of Greenwich is a line of longitude that extends from the North Pole across the Arctic Ocean, North America, the Pacific Ocean, the Southern Ocean, and Antarctica to the South Pole.

106°W is the Third Meridian of the Dominion Land Survey in Canada.

The 106th meridian west forms a great circle with the 74th meridian east.

== From Pole to Pole ==
Starting at the North Pole and heading south to the South Pole, the 106th meridian west passes through:

| Co-ordinates | Country, territory or sea | Notes |
|---|---|---|
| 90°0′N 106°0′W | Arctic Ocean | |
| 78°10′N 106°0′W | Maclean Strait | |
| 77°45′N 106°0′W | Canada | Nunavut — Lougheed Island |
| 77°41′N 106°0′W | Byam Martin Channel | |
| 76°1′N 106°0′W | Canada | Nunavut — Melville Island |
| 75°3′N 106°0′W | Parry Channel | Viscount Melville Sound |
| 73°44′N 106°0′W | Canada | Nunavut — Stefansson Island, Victoria Island and the Finlayson Islands |
| 69°6′N 106°0′W | Dease Strait | |
| 68°54′N 106°0′W | Canada | Nunavut; Northwest Territories — from 64°34′N 106°0′W; Saskatchewan — from 60°0′N 106°0′W |
| 49°0′N 106°0′W | United States | Montana; Wyoming — from 45°0′N 106°0′W; Colorado — from 41°0′N 106°0′W; New Mexico — from 37°0′N 106°0′W, passing through Santa Fe (at 35°39′N 106°0′W); Texas — from 32°0′N 106°0′W |
| 31°23′N 106°0′W | Mexico | Chihuahua; Durango — from 26°49′N 106°0′W; Sinaloa — from 24°10′N 106°0′W |
| 22°48′N 106°0′W | Pacific Ocean | |
| 60°0′S 106°0′W | Southern Ocean | |
| 75°15′S 106°0′W | Antarctica | Unclaimed territory |

== See also ==
- 105th meridian west
- 107th meridian west
