= 107th meridian west =

Line of longitude

107th meridian west (interactive map)

The meridian 107° west of Greenwich is a line of longitude that extends from the North Pole across the Arctic Ocean, North America, the Pacific Ocean, the Southern Ocean, and Antarctica to the South Pole.

The 107th meridian west forms a great circle with the 73rd meridian east.

== From Pole to Pole ==
Starting at the North Pole and heading south to the South Pole, the 107th meridian west passes through:

Co-ordinates	Country, territory or sea	Notes
90°0′N 107°0′W	Arctic Ocean	
77°45′N 107°0′W	Byam Martin Channel	
75°54′N 107°0′W	Canada	Nunavut — Melville Island
74°55′N 107°0′W	Parry Channel	Viscount Melville Sound — passing just west of Stefansson Island, Nunavut, Canada (at 73°29′N 106°59′W)
73°18′N 107°0′W	Canada	Nunavut — Victoria Island
69°12′N 107°0′W	Dease Strait	
68°46′N 107°0′W	Canada	Nunavut; Northwest Territories — from 64°38′N 107°0′W; Saskatchewan — from 60°0′N 107°0′W
49°0′N 107°0′W	United States	Montana; Wyoming — from 45°0′N 107°0′W; Colorado — from 41°0′N 107°0′W; New Mexico — from 37°0′N 107°0′W
31°47′N 107°0′W	Mexico	Chihuahua; Durango — from 25°38′N 107°0′W; Sinaloa — from 24°56′N 107°0′W
23°56′N 107°0′W	Pacific Ocean	
60°0′S 107°0′W	Southern Ocean	
74°47′S 107°0′W	Antarctica	Unclaimed territory

== See also ==
- 106th meridian west
- 108th meridian west
