= 117th meridian west =

Line of longitude

117th meridian west

The meridian 117° west of Greenwich is a line of longitude that extends from the North Pole across the Arctic Ocean, North America, the Pacific Ocean, the Southern Ocean, and Antarctica to the South Pole.

The 117th meridian west forms a great circle with the 63rd meridian east.

== From Pole to Pole ==
Starting at the North Pole and heading south to the South Pole, the 117th meridian west passes through:

| Co-ordinates | Country, territory or sea | Notes |
|---|---|---|
| 90°0′N 117°0′W | Arctic Ocean | |
| 77°28′N 117°0′W | Canada | Northwest Territories — Prince Patrick Island |
| 76°20′N 117°0′W | Fitzwilliam Strait | |
| 76°12′N 117°0′W | Kellett Strait | |
| 75°44′N 117°0′W | Canada | Northwest Territories — Melville Island |
| 75°34′N 117°0′W | Purchase Bay | |
| 75°29′N 117°0′W | Canada | Northwest Territories — Melville Island |
| 75°9′N 117°0′W | M'Clure Strait | |
| 74°7′N 117°0′W | Canada | Northwest Territories — Banks Island |
| 73°7′N 117°0′W | Prince of Wales Strait | |
| 72°57′N 117°0′W | Canada | Northwest Territories — Victoria Island |
| 70°32′N 117°0′W | Prince Albert Sound | |
| 70°6′N 117°0′W | Canada | Northwest Territories — Victoria Island; Nunavut — from 70°0′N 117°0′W on Victoria Island; Northwest Territories — from 69°49′N 117°0′W on Victoria Island |
| 69°41′N 117°0′W | Dolphin and Union Strait | |
| 68°54′N 117°0′W | Canada | Nunavut; Northwest Territories — from 66°52′N 117°0′W; Alberta — from 60°0′N 117°0′W; British Columbia — from 51°50′N 117°0′W |
| 49°0′N 117°0′W | United States | Idaho; Washington — from 46°18′N 117°0′W; Oregon — from 46°0′N 117°0′W; Idaho — from 44°46′N 117°0′W; Oregon — from 44°15′N 117°0′W; Idaho — from 43°52′N 117°0′W; Nevada — from 42°0′N 117°0′W; California — from 36°51′N 117°0′W and passing through San Diego at 32°56′N 117°0′W. |
| 32°33′N 117°0′W | Mexico | Baja California — passing through Tijuana |
| 32°16′N 117°0′W | Pacific Ocean | |
| 60°0′S 117°0′W | Southern Ocean | |
| 73°57′S 117°0′W | Antarctica | Unclaimed territory |

== See also ==
- 116th meridian west
- 118th meridian west
