= Sherard Bay =

Bay in Nunavut, Canada

- Location within Nunavut
- Location: Viscount Melville Sound
- Coordinates: 76°08′N 108°07′W
- Ocean/sea sources: Arctic Ocean
- Basin countries: Canada
- Settlements: Uninhabited

Sherard Bay is an Arctic waterway in the Qikiqtaaluk Region, Nunavut, Canada. Located off northern Melville Island's Sabine Peninsula, the bay is an arm of Byam Martin Channel. Eden Bay and Weatherall Bay are nearby.
