= Nallukatarvik =

Islands in Nunavut, Canada

- Location within Nunavut Location within Canada

Geography
- Location: Coronation Gulf
- Coordinates: 68°00′43″N 108°46′47″W
- Archipelago: Arctic Archipelago

Administration
- Canada
- Territory: Nunavut
- Region: Kitikmeot

Demographics
- Population: Uninhabited

Nallukatarvik, formerly the Piercey Islands, are an island group located in Coronation Gulf, south of Victoria Island, west of Kiillinnguyaq, in the Kitikmeot Region, Nunavut, Canada. Other island groups in the vicinity include the Nakahungaqtuaryuit, Chapman Islands, Cheere Islands, Cockburn Islands, Porden Islands, Stockport Islands, Triple Islands, and Ungiiviit.
