= 103rd meridian west =

Line of longitude

103rd meridian west (interactive map)

The meridian 103° west of Greenwich is a line of longitude that extends from the North Pole across the Arctic Ocean, North America, the Pacific Ocean, the Southern Ocean, and Antarctica to the South Pole.

In the United States, the border between New Mexico and Oklahoma is defined by the meridian.

The 103rd meridian west forms a great circle with the 77th meridian east.

== From Pole to Pole ==
Starting at the North Pole and heading south to the South Pole, the 103rd meridian west passes through:

Co-ordinates	Country, territory or sea	Notes
90°0′N 103°0′W	Arctic Ocean	
79°15′N 103°0′W	Canada	Nunavut — Ellef Ringnes Island and Thor Island
78°9′N 103°0′W	Maclean Strait	
77°40′N 103°0′W	Unnamed waterbody	
76°27′N 103°0′W	Canada	Nunavut — Cameron Island, Île Vanier, Massey Island and Alexander Island
75°33′N 103°0′W	Austin Channel	
75°25′N 103°0′W	Parry Channel	Viscount Melville Sound
73°10′N 103°0′W	M'Clintock Channel	Passing just west of Prince of Wales Island, Nunavut, Canada (at 72°46′N 102°44′W)
70°41′N 103°0′W	Canada	Nunavut — Victoria
68°48′N 103°0′W	Queen Maud Gulf	
67°54′N 103°0′W	Canada	Nunavut; Northwest Territories — from 64°19′N 103°0′W; Saskatchewan — from 60°0′N 103°0′W
49°0′N 103°0′W	United States	North Dakota; South Dakota — from 45°57′N 103°0′W; Nebraska — from 43°0′N 103°0′W; Colorado — from 41°0′N 103°0′W; New Mexico / Oklahoma border — from 37°0′N 103°0′W; Texas — from 36°30′N 103°0′W
29°9′N 103°0′W	Mexico	Coahuila; Durango — from 24°47′N 103°0′W; Zacatecas — from 24°26′N 103°0′W; Jalisco — from 21°17′N 103°0′W; Michoacán — from 20°11′N 103°0′W; Jalisco — from 19°58′N 103°0′W, passing through Lake Chapala; Michoacán — from 19°3′N 103°0′W
18°10′N 103°0′W	Pacific Ocean	
60°0′S 103°0′W	Southern Ocean	
72°21′S 103°0′W	Antarctica	Unclaimed territory
73°15′S 103°0′W	Southern Ocean	Amundsen Sea
74°52′S 103°0′W	Antarctica	Unclaimed territory

== See also ==
- 102nd meridian west
- 104th meridian west
