= Triple Islands =

Island group in Nunavut, Canada

- Location within Nunavut Location within Canada

Geography
- Location: Bathurst Inlet
- Coordinates: 68°12′N 108°50′W
- Archipelago: Arctic Archipelago

Administration
- Canada
- Territory: Nunavut
- Region: Kitikmeot

Demographics
- Population: Uninhabited

The uninhabited Triple Islands are an island group located in Bathurst Inlet, south of Victoria Island, west of the Kent Peninsula, in the Kitikmeot Region, Nunavut, Canada. Other island groups in the vicinity include the Breakwater Islands, Chapman Islands, Cockburn Islands, Entry Islands, Piercey Islands, Porden Islands, and Wilmot Islands.
