= Panarctic Oils Flight 416 =

1974 aviation accident in Canada

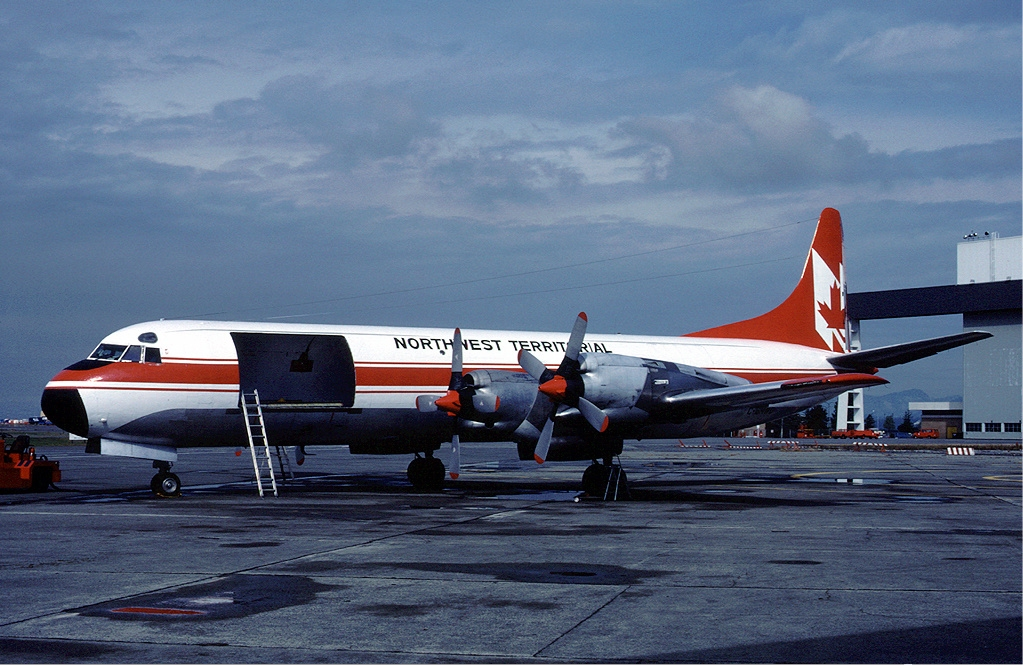
- A Lockheed L-188 Electra registered in Canada, similar to the crashed plane

Accident
- Date: 30 October 1974
- Summary: Controlled flight into terrain (icy sea surface)
- Site: Byam Channel, 3 kilometres (1.9 mi) south of Rea Point Airfield, Melville Island, Northwest Territories, Canada

Aircraft
- Aircraft type: Lockheed L-188 Electra
- Operator: Panarctic Oils
- Registration: CF-PAB
- Flight origin: Calgary Airport, Alberta, Canada
- Stopover: Edmonton Airport, Alberta, Canada
- Destination: Rea Point Airfield, Canada
- Occupants: 34
- Passengers: 30
- Crew: 4
- Fatalities: 32
- Injuries: 2
- Survivors: 2

Panarctic Oils Flight 416 was a flight that crashed in the Arctic, killing 32 of the 34 people on board on 30 October 1974. The Lockheed L-188 Electra passenger plane took off from Edmonton Airport toward Rea Point Airfield on Melville Island in the Canadian Arctic. As the plane was approaching the airfield, it went down short of the runway, hitting the icy surface of the Byam Channel and then falling through the ice. All 30 passengers and two of the four crew members were killed in the accident.

== Aircraft and operators ==
The aircraft involved in the accident was a Lockheed L-188 Electra, which had been delivered to Northwest Orient Airlines on 23 May 1961. From 29 December 1969 the aircraft with its new registration CF-PAB belonged to the fleet of International Jetair Ltd. and from March 1970 to Panarctic Oils. The aircraft was equipped with four Allison 501-D13 turboprop engines.

Panarctic Oils was a company founded in 1966 to explore for oil deposits in the Canadian Arctic Circle. It was later absorbed into Petro-Canada. To transport employees and equipment, Panarctic Oils initially chartered aircraft from other companies, but soon established its own fleet of aircraft.

== Flight history ==
=== First leg of the flight ===
Panarctic Oils Flight 416 took off at 6:05 p.m. on October 29, 1974. The Lockheed L-188 Electra departed Calgary Airport for a positioning flight to Edmonton Airport. At that time, there were only a crew of three on board, consisting of the flight captain, first officer and flight engineer. The half-hour flight went without incident. The aircraft was prepared in Edmonton for the onward flight to the Arctic north of Canada. Baggage and cargo weighing 20,000 pounds (9,100 kg) were brought on board and the plane was refueled with 21,000 pounds (9,500 kg) of Jet B jet fuel. The captain and the flight engineer were replaced. The new captain was briefed on the weather conditions and the flight plan was submitted.

=== Second leg of the flight ===
The estimated duration of the second leg of the flight was 4 hours and 12 minutes. There were 30 passengers on board, as well as a fourth, male crew member, who acted as loadmaster and flight attendant at the same time on the combined cargo and passenger flight.

The Electra took off again from Edmonton at 8:04 p.m. The flight went without any special incidents. As far as Fort Smith, Northwest Territories, the aircraft was flown at an altitude of 18,000 feet (5,500 m), then it climbed to 21,000 feet (6,400 m). In accordance with the schedule, the aircraft flew over Byron Bay in what is now Nunavut at 11:04 p.m. About 100 miles (160 km) further north, the aircraft climbed to an altitude of 25,000 feet (7,600 m). When the aircraft was about 150 miles (240 km) from Rea Point, the crew made radio contact with the landing site. A VOR/DME straight approach to runway 33 was performed. The initiated descent was quiet apart from some turbulence at an altitude of 4,000 feet (1,200 m). When they were at a distance of about 17 miles (27 km) from Rea Point Airfield, the pilots maintained an altitude of 2,000 feet (610 m) for 1 minute and 45 seconds before lowering the aircraft further until it was at an altitude of about 875 feet (267 m) at a distance of 6 miles (9.7 km) from the airfield. The crew contacted the airfield at Rea Point and informed them of their DME distance on the final approach.

During the approach, the engine power was adjusted to 1500 hp each. Both VHF navigation devices were tuned to the frequency of the Rea Point rotary radio beacon and both radio compasses were tuned to the non-directional beacon of Rea Point. Both barometric altimeters in the cockpit were tuned to the local air pressure of the target airfield of 29.91 inches of mercury (101.3 kPa). The indicated airspeed (IAS) was 150 knots (280 km/h; 170 mph) with a headwind component of 30 knots (56 km/h; 35 mph), which corresponded to a ground speed of 120 knots (220 km/h; 140 mph). The landing checklist was completed, and the flaps and landing gear were fully extended. The landing lights were extended but not switched on, but the headlights in the leading edges of the wings and the rolling lights were. The captain did not conduct a pre-landing briefing.

== Accident ==
Looking out of the cockpit window, the flight engineer thought he could see the icy sea. The captain, on the other hand, believed that the aircraft was above a layer of clouds, so he reduced the thrust and pushed the control horn forward, causing significant g-forces to act on the plane. The rate of descent increased rapidly to 1,700 feet (520 m) to 2,000 feet (610 m) per minute. When the aircraft was at an altitude of 200 feet (61 m) and 2 miles (3.2 km) from the runway, the first officer shouted to the captain piloting the aircraft that the rate of descent was too high, to which the pilot did not respond. At an altitude of 50 feet (15 m), the first officer and the flight engineer both called out to the captain again, but again there was no response. The first officer stretched out his hand to the thrust levers on the right side, where the flight engineer's hand was already located. The plane hit the ice. On impact, the cockpit section tore off the fuselage and slid, along with the cargo, 900 feet (270 m) over the ice. The fuselage of the plane sank into the hole created by the impact in the ice surface. After the cockpit section came to a stop on the ice, the flight engineer unfastened his harness. When he straightened up, he saw that the captain and the first officer were still in their seats. Although he was injured, the first officer managed to unfasten his seat belt. The flight engineer managed to pull him onto the ice. Shortly afterwards the ice collapsed around the cockpit section, which then plunged into the water and sank.

== Victims and survivors ==
Only the first officer, David Wayne Hatton, and the flight engineer, Garry Douglas Weyman, survived the accident. One passenger, who had initially survived, died on the way to the hospital in Edmonton, several thousand kilometers away, due to hemorrhagic shock caused by severe blood loss. Of the plane's remaining 31 occupants, 16 had potentially survivable injuries. Of these individuals, an estimated five survived for more than 15 minutes, four survived for 10 to 15 minutes, and seven for less than 10 minutes. Of those who survived less than 10 minutes, six were found on the seabed, probably drowned.

Although the crash site was only 2.5 nautical miles (2.9 mi; 4.6 km) from the end of the runway, it took about two hours from the time of the crash to the arrival of emergency responders. The delay was due to an inadequately defined emergency response procedure. There was no off-airport vehicle on standby, and emergency response following the loss of radio contact with the aircraft was slow to be initiated. However, according to the accident report, it was unlikely that a faster response would have affected the outcome.

== Reactions ==
In a 4 November 1974 article in the Medicine Hat News, the crash site in the Arctic Ocean was described as the "worst place for an (aviation) accident" in icy conditions. The island is located about 700 kilometres (430 mi) from the Canadian mainland, within a radius of hundreds of kilometers there are only Arctic Ocean and polar steppe, most areas are uninhabited, professional medical infrastructure was non-existent in the region, and the nearest major cities with professionally equipped trauma clinics are thousands of kilometers away. The distance to Edmonton, where the originally rescued passenger was to be transferred, is more than 2,400 kilometres (1,500 mi). The weakened accident victims, with their potentially survivable injuries, were exposed to extreme cold and rapid first aid could hardly be provided.

== Cause of accident ==
A 60-page report on the accident was published. The following accident factors were reported:

- The approach continued below the minimum descent altitude permitted by the airline;
- the pilot in charge reacted inappropriately to a visual cue and suddenly initiated the last rapid descent; this descent was described as "irrational";
- the excessively high rate of descent was not corrected due to the partial incapacitation of the pilot-in-charge;
- crew resource management in the final stages of the flight was inadequate;
- no flight operations manual or similar document had been provided by the carrier that would adequately set out the duties and responsibilities of the flight crew;
- the flight was operated in accordance with the operating regulations for private and not commercial flights;
- the emergency response at Rea Point Airfield was inadequate.
