= 116th meridian west =

Line of longitude

116th meridian west

The meridian 116° west of Greenwich is a line of longitude that extends from the North Pole across the Arctic Ocean, North America, the Pacific Ocean, the Southern Ocean, and Antarctica to the South Pole.

The 116th meridian west forms a great circle with the 64th meridian east.

== From Pole to Pole ==
Starting at the North Pole and heading south to the South Pole, the 116th meridian west passes through:

| Co-ordinates | Country, territory or sea | Notes |
|---|---|---|
| 90°0′N 116°0′W | Arctic Ocean | |
| 77°27′N 116°0′W | Canada | Northwest Territories — Prince Patrick Island |
| 76°39′N 116°0′W | Fitzwilliam Strait | |
| 76°12′N 116°0′W | Canada | Northwest Territories — Melville Island |
| 75°1′N 116°0′W | M'Clure Strait | |
| 73°46′N 116°0′W | Canada | Northwest Territories — Banks Island |
| 73°18′N 116°0′W | Prince of Wales Strait | |
| 73°7′N 116°0′W | Canada | Northwest Territories — Victoria Island |
| 70°32′N 116°0′W | Prince Albert Sound | |
| 70°14′N 116°0′W | Canada | Northwest Territories — Victoria Island; Nunavut — from 70°0′N 116°0′W on Victoria Island |
| 69°20′N 116°0′W | Dolphin and Union Strait | |
| 68°57′N 116°0′W | Canada | Nunavut; Northwest Territories — from 66°34′N 116°0′W, passing through the Great Slave Lake; Alberta — from 60°0′N 116°0′W; British Columbia — from 51°8′N 116°0′W |
| 49°0′N 116°0′W | United States | Montana; Idaho — from 47°55′N 116°0′W; Nevada — from 42°0′N 116°0′W; California — from 36°4′N 116°0′W |
| 32°37′N 116°0′W | Mexico | Baja California |
| 30°21′N 116°0′W | Pacific Ocean | |
| 60°0′S 116°0′W | Southern Ocean | |
| 73°51′S 116°0′W | Antarctica | Unclaimed territory |

== See also ==
- 115th meridian west
- 117th meridian west
