= Eden Bay =

Bay in Qikiqtaaluk Region, Nunavut, Canada

- Location within Nunavut
- Location: Byam Martin Channel
- Coordinates: 76°37′N 108°34′W
- Ocean/sea sources: Arctic Ocean
- Basin countries: Canada
- Settlements: Uninhabited

Eden Bay is an Arctic waterway in the Qikiqtaaluk Region, Nunavut, Canada. Located off northern Melville Island's Sabine Peninsula, the bay is an arm of Byam Martin Channel. Sherard Bay is to the south.
