= Cockburn Islands =

Group of islands in Northern Canada

- Location within Nunavut Location within Canada

Geography
- Location: Coronation Gulf
- Coordinates: 68°05′N 108°23′W
- Archipelago: Canadian Arctic Archipelago
- Area: 33 km^{2} (13 sq mi)

Administration
- Canada
- Territory: Nunavut
- Region: Kitikmeot

Demographics
- Population: Uninhabited

The Cockburn Islands are an island group located in Coronation Gulf, south of Victoria Island, west of the Kent Peninsula, in the Kitikmeot Region, Nunavut, Canada. Other island groups in the vicinity include the Breakwater Islands, Cheere Islands, Piercey Islands, Porden Islands, Stockport Islands, Triple Islands, and Wilmot Islands.
