= Kitaagunnaat =

Island group in Nunavut, Canada

- Location within Nunavut Location within Canada

Geography
- Location: Coronation Gulf
- Coordinates: 67°39′55″N 108°54′27″W
- Archipelago: Arctic Archipelago

Administration
- Canada
- Territory: Nunavut
- Region: Kitikmeot

Demographics
- Population: Uninhabited

Kitaagunnaat formerly the Cheere Islands are an island group located in Coronation Gulf, south of Victoria Island, west of Kiillinnguyaq (Kent Peninsula), in the Kitikmeot Region, Nunavut, Canada. Other island groups in the vicinity include the Barry Islands, Nakahungaqtuaryuit, Chapman Islands, Cockburn Islands, Nallukatarvik, and Stockport Islands.
