= Goldsmith Channel =

Coordinates: 73°10′N 106°05′W

Goldsmith Channel is a waterway in the Canadian territory of Nunavut connecting Parry Channel and M'Clintock Channel. Broadest in the northwest, the island-filled channel narrows as it progresses to the southeast where it separates northeastern Victoria Island's Storkerson Peninsula from western Stefansson Island by a few hundred meters of shallow water. This is an uninhabited, extremely remote area. Elvira Island is located at the head of the channel.
