= Napier =

Napier may refer to:

== Companies ==
- D. Napier & Son, a British engineering company
- Napier Enterprises, Canadian developer and distributor of vehicle camping tents
- Napier Company (jewellery), American jewellery company
- Robert Napier and Sons, a former Clydeside shipbuilder, Scotland

== People ==
- Napier (surname), including a list of people with that name
- Napier baronets, five baronetcies and lists of the title holders

=== Given name ===
- Napier Shaw (1854–1945), British meteorologist
- Napier Waller (1893–1972), Australian muralist, mosaicist and painter

== Places ==
=== Antarctica ===
- Napier Island, in Marguerite Bay, on the Fallières Coast
- Napier Mountains, in Enderby Land, East Antarctica
- Napier Peak, in the South Shetland Islands, Western Antarctica
- Napier Rock, in Admiralty Bay, King George Island, South Shetland Islands

=== Australia ===
- Mount Napier, a dormant volcano in Victoria
- Napier Range, a mountain range in Western Australia
- Napier County in New South Wales
- Napier, New South Wales, a locality in the Riverina region
- Electoral district of Napier, a former electoral district in South Australia
- Napier, Western Australia, a locality of the City of Albany

=== Canada ===
- Napier, Ontario, an unincorporated place in Middlesex County
- Napier Bay, an Arctic waterway in Qikiqtaaluk Region, Nunavut

=== India ===
- Napier Bay Islands, in the Andaman Islands, South Andaman

=== New Zealand ===
- Napier, New Zealand, a city
- Napier (New Zealand electorate), a parliamentary electorate

=== Singapore ===
- Napier MRT station, an MRT station as part of the Thomson-East Coast Line in Singapore

=== South Africa ===
- Napier, South Africa, a village in Overberg, Western Cape

=== United States ===
- Napier, Missouri, a rail junction in Holt County
- Napier, West Virginia, an unincorporated community in Braxton County
- Napier Field, Alabama
- Napier Township, Pennsylvania

== Other uses ==
- 7096 Napier, a Mars-orbit crossing asteroid
- Edinburgh Napier University, Scotland (original name Napier Technical College)
- HMS Napier, a list of ships with this name
- Napier Building, a building on the North Terrace campus of the University of Adelaide, South Australia

== See also ==
- Grant Napear, American sportscaster with a similarly spelled surname
- Napier Road (disambiguation)
- Neper, a unit of measurement
