= Entry Islands =

Entry Islands may refer to:

- Nattiqtuut formerly the Entry Islands, Kitikmeot Region, Nunavut
- Entry Islands (Qikiqtaaluk Region, Nunavut)

May also refer to:

- Entry Island, an island off the coast of Quebec in the Magdalen Islands archipelago.
- Entry Island, an island off the coast of Fiordland in New Zealand the waters around which are protected by the Moana Uta (Wet Jacket Arm) Marine Reserve
