= Dyke Acland Bay =

Bay in Nunavut, Canada

- Location within Nunavut
- Location: Parry Channel
- Coordinates: 75°01′N 98°54′W
- Basin countries: Canada
- Settlements: Uninhabited

Dyke Acland Bay is an Arctic waterway in the Qikiqtaaluk Region, Nunavut, Canada. Located off southern Bathurst Island, the bay is an arm of Parry Channel.

It is named after Sir Thomas Dyke Acland, 10th Baronet.
