= Eldridge Bay =

Bay in Nunavut, Canada

- Location within Nunavut
- Location: Hecla and Griper Bay
- Coordinates: 76°05′30″N 109°42′00″W
- Ocean/sea sources: Arctic Ocean
- Basin countries: Canada
- Settlements: Uninhabited

Eldridge Bay is a Canadian Arctic waterway located mainly in the Qikiqtaaluk Region or Nunavut but with a small portion in the southwest corner of the Inuvik Region of the Northwest Territories. Lying off the coast of Melville Island's Sabine Peninsula, the bay is an arm of Hecla and Griper Bay. To the south lies Sabine Bay.
