= 78th parallel =

78th parallel may refer to:

- 78th parallel north, a circle of latitude in the Northern Hemisphere
- 78th parallel south, a circle of latitude in the Southern Hemisphere
