= 77th parallel =

77th parallel may refer to:

- 77th parallel north, a circle of latitude in the Northern Hemisphere
- 77th parallel south, a circle of latitude in the Southern Hemisphere
