= Cockburn Island =

Cockburn Island is the name of the following islands:

- Cockburn Island (Antarctica)
- Cockburn Island (Ontario)
- Cockburn Island (Polynesia), the former name of Fangataufa in French Polynesia

In addition, the Cockburn Islands are a group of islands in the Canadian Arctic.
