= 80th parallel =

80th parallel may refer to:

- 80th parallel north, a circle of latitude in the Northern Hemisphere
- 80th parallel south, a circle of latitude in the Southern Hemisphere
