= Austin Channel =

Strait between Bathurst and Byam Martin Islands in Nunavut

Location in Nunavut

The Austin Channel (75°30′N 103°30′W) is a natural waterway through the central Canadian Arctic Archipelago in the Qikiqtaaluk Region, Nunavut. It separates Byam Martin Island (to the south) from Melville Island (to the west) and the Alexander and Bathurst Islands (to the north-east). To the north it opens to the Byam Martin Channel, to the south-west to the Byam Channel, and to the south-east to the Viscount Melville Sound (part of the Parry Channel).
