= Cheere =

Cheere may refer to:

- Cheere baronets, created in the Baronetage of Great Britain on 19 July 1766
- Cheere Islands, Nunavut, Canada

== People with the surname ==
- John Cheere, English sculptor
- Sir Henry Cheere, 1st Baronet (1776–1781)
