= Ungiiviit =

Island group in Nunavut, Canada

- Location within Nunavut Location within Canada

Geography
- Location: Coronation Gulf
- Coordinates: 68°12′36″N 109°05′17″W
- Archipelago: Arctic Archipelago
- Area: 21 km^{2} (8.1 sq mi)

Administration
- Canada
- Territory: Nunavut
- Region: Kitikmeot

Demographics
- Population: Uninhabited

Ungiiviit formerly the Wilmot Islands are an island group located in Coronation Gulf, south of Victoria Island, in the Kitikmeot Region, Nunavut, Canada. Other island groups in the vicinity include the Nakahungaqtuaryuit, Chapman Islands, Cockburn Islands, Nattiqtuut, Jameson Islands, Piercey Islands, Porden Islands, and Triple Islands.
