= Jameson Islands =

Island group in Nunavut, Canada

- Location within Nunavut Location within Canada

Geography
- Location: Coronation Gulf
- Coordinates: 68°06′15″N 109°57′15″W
- Archipelago: Arctic Archipelago
- Area: 102 km^{2} (39 sq mi)

Administration
- Canada
- Territory: Nunavut
- Region: Kitikmeot

Demographics
- Population: Uninhabited

The Jameson Islands are an island group located in the Coronation Gulf, south of Victoria Island, in the Kitikmeot Region, Nunavut, Canada. Other island groups in the vicinity include the Chapman Islands, Sesqui Islands, and Wilmot Islands.
