= Kilian Island =

Island in Nunavut, Canada

- Location within Nunavut Location within Canada

Geography
- Location: Parry Channel
- Coordinates: 73°35′N 107°53′W

Administration
- Canada
- Territory: Nunavut

Demographics
- Population: Uninhabited

Kilian Island formerly Elvira Island is an uninhabited island in the Qikiqtaaluk Region, Nunavut, Canada. It is located in the Viscount Melville Sound, west of Stefansson Island, and north of Victoria Island.

It is named for Bernhard Kilian, chief engineer of the Polar Bear who tried to salvage the burning ship Elvira in September 1913 when the two schooners (the Polar Bear and the Elvira) were frozen in the ice of the Beaufort Sea, along with two ships belonging to Rudolph Martin Anderson's southern team of the Vilhjalmur Stefansson's Canadian Arctic Expedition, 1913–1916.
