= Prince Gustaf Adolf Sea =

Marginal sea of the Arctic Ocean located in Qikiqtaaluk Region, Nunavut, Canada

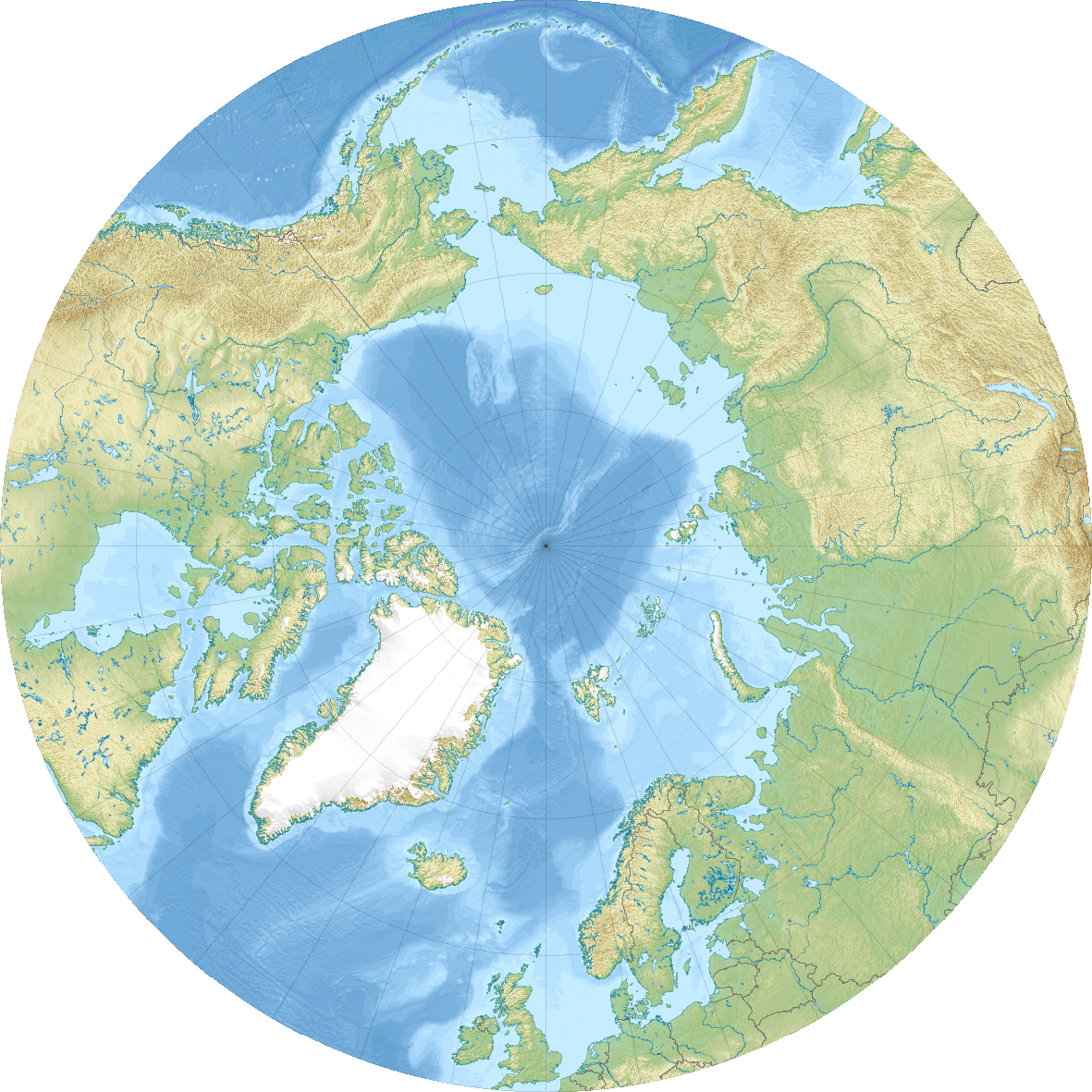
- Location in the Arctic

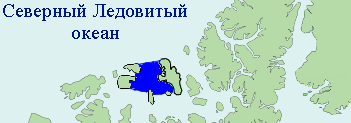
- Location
- Location: Arctic Ocean
- Coordinates: 78°30′30″N 106°45′40″W
- Type: Sea
- Basin countries: Nunavut and Northwest Territories, Canada
- Max. length: 800 km (500 mi)

Prince Gustaf Adolf Sea formerly Prince Gustav Adolf Sea (French: Mer du Prince-Gustave-Adolphe) is a marginal sea of the Arctic Ocean located in the Qikiqtaaluk Region, Nunavut, and the Inuvik Region, Canada.

== Geography ==
It is situated among the islands of the Arctic Archipelago. The sea is bounded on the west by Borden Island and Mackenzie King Island, and on the east by Ellef Ringnes Island. To the south is Lougheed Island. The sea opens into the Arctic Ocean to the north, and into the Byam Martin Channel and Maclean Strait to the south.

The Sea was named in 1898 by Otto Sverdrup after the Swedish prince (and later king) Gustav VI Adolf.

== See also ==
- List of seas
