= Hecla and Griper Bay =

Bay in Arctic Canada

- Location within Northwest Territories
- Location: Hazen Strait
- Coordinates: 76°02′03″N 110°30′09″W
- Basin countries: Canada
- Settlements: Uninhabited

Hecla and Griper Bay is an Arctic waterway. Located in the Hazen Strait, it is a large inlet in the north of Melville Island, Canada. It is split between the Northwest Territories and Nunavut. The bay takes its name from Arctic explorer William Edward Parry's ships HMS Hecla and HMS Griper.

== Geography ==
Dominant landforms include: Long Point, Middle Point, Nias Point, and Cape Fisher on its western shores; Sabine Bay to the south; Eldridge Bay and the Sabine Peninsula to the east; and Macdougall Point at its northeastern opening.
