= Nattiqtuut =

Island in Nunavut, Canada, in the Arctic Circle

- Location within Nunavut Location within Canada

Geography
- Location: Coronation Gulf
- Coordinates: 68°22′00″N 108°55′29″W
- Archipelago: Arctic Archipelago

Administration
- Canada
- Territory: Nunavut
- Region: Kitikmeot

Demographics
- Population: Uninhabited

Nattiqtuut formerly the Entry Islands are an island group located in Coronation Gulf, south of Victoria Island, west of Kiillinnguyaq, in the Kitikmeot Region, Nunavut, Canada. Other island groups in the vicinity include the Porden Islands, Triple Islands, and Ungiiviit.
