= Vesey Hamilton =

Royal Navy Admiral (1829–1912)

Admiral Sir Vesey Hamilton GCB
- Born: 28 May 1829; Sandwich, UK
- Died: 17 September 1912 (aged 83); Chalfont St Peter, UK
- Relatives: J. W. Hamilton (brother)
- Military career
- Allegiance: United Kingdom
- Branch: Royal Navy
- Service years: 1843–1894
- Rank: Admiral
- Commands: HMS Hydra; HMS Achilles; Coast of Ireland Station; China Station
- Wars: Second Opium War; Battle of Fatshan Creek
- Awards: Knight Grand Cross of the Order of the Bath

Admiral Sir Richard Vesey Hamilton GCB (28 May 1829 – 17 September 1912) was a Royal Navy officer. As a junior officer he twice volunteered to take part in missions to search for Sir John Franklin's ill-fated expedition to find the Northwest Passage. He also took part in the Battle of Fatshan Creek in June 1857 during the Second Opium War.

Later in his career he became commander-in-chief at China Station and took his fleet into Vladivostok harbour in 1886, which surprised the Russians. He became First Naval Lord in July 1889 and in that role he was primarily concerned with implementing the recommendations contained in a report on the disposition of the ships of the Royal Navy many of which were unarmoured and together incapable of meeting the combined threat from any two of the other naval powers ("the Two-power Standard"): these recommendations had been enshrined in the Naval Defence Act 1889. He finished his career as President of the Royal Naval College at Greenwich.

== Early career ==
Born the son of the Revd John Vesey Hamilton and his wife Frances Agnes Hamilton (née Malone), Hamilton was educated at the Royal Naval School in Camberwell and joined the Royal Navy in July 1843. He was posted to the sloop HMS Virago in the Mediterranean Fleet.

He volunteered to become a mate on the barque HMS Assistance which was despatched in 1850, under the command of Captain Erasmus Ommanney, on a mission to search for Sir John Franklin and his ill-fated expedition to find the Northwest Passage. Promoted to lieutenant on 11 October 1851, he volunteered for a second mission this time in the barque HMS Resolute which was despatched in 1852, under the command of Captain Henry Kellett, in search of Franklin. While in the Arctic Hamilton was tasked with carrying out surveys of islands, including the first survey of the northern end of Melville island. He would work with a sled ashore to survey the islands. He gave his name to the small island Vesey Hamilton Island in the Hazen Strait. Resolute became stuck in the ice in the spring of 1854 and Kellett and his crew were ordered to abandon ship.

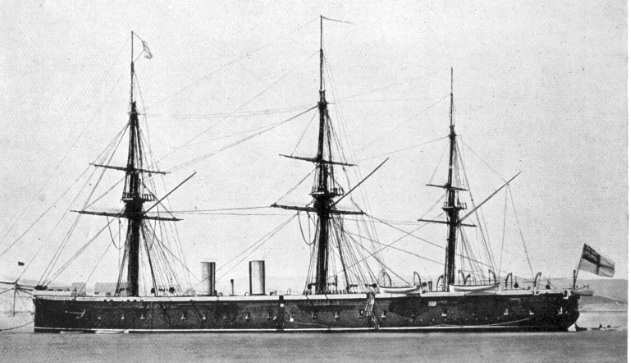
Hamilton commanded HMS Achilles in 1870

Hamilton was given command of the gunboat HMS Haughty in February 1856 and took part in the Battle of Fatshan Creek in June 1857 during the Second Opium War. Promoted to[commander on 10 August 1857, he was given command of the sloop HMS Hydra on the West Indies Station in June 1858.

Promoted to captain on 27 January 1862, he took command of the sloop HMS Vesuvius on the West Indies Station in July 1862, the sloop HMS Sphinx on the West Indies Station in 1865 and the broadside ironclad HMS Achilles on coast guard service at Portland Harbour in April 1870. He became commander of the steam reserve at Devonport in 1873 and captain-superintendent of Pembroke Dock in March 1875 and was appointed a Companion of the Order of the Bath on 29 May 1875.

== Senior command ==
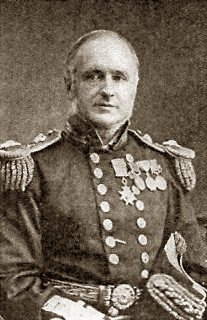
Hamilton as a rear admiral

Promoted to rear admiral on 27 September 1877, Hamilton was appointed Director of Naval Ordnance at the Admiralty in 1878. He was given command of the Coast of Ireland Station in 1880 and, having been promoted to vice admiral on 17 February 1884, he became commander-in-chief of China Station in September 1885; he took his fleet into Vladivostok harbour the following year and gave the Russians a surprise. He was advanced to Knight Commander of the Order of the Bath on 21 June 1887 and promoted to full admiral on 18 October 1887.

Hamilton went on to be Second Naval Lord in December 1888, and First Naval Lord in July 1889. In that role he was primarily concerned with implementing the recommendations contained in a report on the disposition of the ships of the Royal Navy many of which were unarmoured and together incapable of meeting the combined threat from any two of the other naval powers ("the Two-power Standard"): these recommendations had been enshrined in the Naval Defence Act 1889. He became President of the Royal Naval Collega at Greenwich, in September 1891 and retired from the Navy in May 1894. He was advanced to Knight Grand Cross of the Order of the Bath on 25 May 1895.

In retirement he wrote Naval Administration; The Constitution, Character, and Functions of the Board of Admiralty, and of the Civil Departments It Directs. He died at his home in Chalfont St Peter in Buckinghamshire on 17 September 1912, and is buried at Eltham in South London.

== Family ==
In 1862, Hamilton married Julia Frances Delmé Murray; they had two sons and two daughters. William John Warburton Hamilton was his eldest brother.

== Publications ==
- Naval Administration: The Constitution, Character, and Functions of the Board of Admiralty, and of the Civil Departments It Directs. G. Bell & Sons. 1896. ISBN 9781150465000.

== Sources ==
- Scholefield, Guy Hardy, ed. (1940). A Dictionary of New Zealand Biography: A–L (PDF). Vol. I. Wellington: DIA.
- Wallis, Geoffrey (1978). A 'Resolute' Reminder. United States Naval Institute Proceedings.

Military offices
Preceded by William Dowell	Senior Officer, Coast of Ireland Station; 1880–1883	Succeeded by Thomas Lethbridge
Preceded by Sir William Dowell	Commander-in-Chief, China Station; 1885–1887	Succeeded by Sir Nowell Salmon
Preceded by Sir Anthony Hoskins	Second Naval Lord; 1888–1889	Succeeded by Sir Henry Fairfax
Preceded by Sir Arthur Hood	First Naval Lord; 1889—1891	Succeeded by Sir Anthony Hoskins
Preceded by Sir William Graham	President, Royal Naval College, Greenwich; 1891–1894	Succeeded by Sir Walter Hunt-Grubbe
