= Byam Channel =

Canadian waterway

The Byam Channel (75°15′N 105°00′W) is a natural waterway through the central Canadian Arctic Archipelago within Qikiqtaaluk Region, Nunavut, Canada. It separates Melville Island (to the west) from Byam Martin Island (to the east). To the south it opens into the Parry Channel, and to the north are the Byam Martin Channel and Austin Channel.
