= Neper (disambiguation) =

Neper is a logarithmic unit of ratio.

Neper may also refer to:

- John Napier, a Scottish mathematician
- Neper (crater), a lunar impact crater
- Neper (mythology), an Egyptian deity

== See also ==
- Napier (disambiguation)
