= 63rd meridian =

63rd meridian may refer to:

- 63rd meridian east, a line of longitude east of the Greenwich Meridian
- 63rd meridian west, a line of longitude west of the Greenwich Meridian

63rd meridian west	63rd meridian east
