= 79th parallel =

79th parallel may refer to:

- 79th parallel north, a circle of latitude in the Northern Hemisphere
- 79th parallel south, a circle of latitude in the Southern Hemisphere
