= 64th meridian east =

Line of longitude

64th meridian east

The meridian 64° east of Greenwich is a line of longitude that extends from the North Pole across the Arctic Ocean, Europe, Asia, the Indian Ocean, the Southern Ocean, and Antarctica to the South Pole.

The 64th meridian east forms a great circle with the 116th meridian west.

== From Pole to Pole ==
Starting at the North Pole and heading south to the South Pole, the 64th meridian east passes through:

Co-ordinates	Country, territory or sea	Notes
90°0′N 64°0′E	Arctic Ocean	
80°57′N 64°0′E	Russia	Graham Bell Island, Franz Josef Land
80°41′N 64°0′E	Barents Sea	
76°18′N 64°0′E	Russia	Severny Island, Novaya Zemlya
75°41′N 64°0′E	Kara Sea	
69°33′N 64°0′E	Russia	
54°18′N 64°0′E	Kazakhstan	
43°37′N 64°0′E	Uzbekistan	
39°4′N 64°0′E	Turkmenistan	
36°2′N 64°0′E	Afghanistan	
29°25′N 64°0′E	Pakistan	Balochistan
25°20′N 64°0′E	Indian Ocean	
60°0′S 64°0′E	Southern Ocean	
67°31′S 64°0′E	Antarctica	Australian Antarctic Territory, claimed by Australia

== See also ==
- 63rd meridian east
- 65th meridian east
