= Purchase Bay =

Bay in the Northwest Territories, Canada

- Location within Northwest Territories
- Location: Melville Island
- Coordinates: 75°35′02″N 116°00′10″W
- Ocean/sea sources: Arctic Ocean
- Basin countries: Canada
- Settlements: Uninhabited

Purchase Bay is a fjord in the Arctic Archipelago, on the western side of Melville Island, Northwest Territories, Canada. It is approximately 65 km (40 mi) long. It was named for the engineer of HMS Intrepid, Thomas Purchase, during the Belcher expedition
