= Cape Flinders =

Headland in Nunavut, Canada

- Cape
- Coordinates: 68°16′N 108°48′W
- Location: Kiillinnguyaq, Nunavut, Canada
- Offshore water bodies: Dease Strait
- Topo map: NTS 77B8 Cape Flinders

Cape Flinders is a headland in the northern Canadian territory of Nunavut. It is located on the western point of the Kent Peninsula, now known as Kiillinnguyaq.

The cape was named by Sir John Franklin in 1821 after the navigator Matthew Flinders.
