= Sabine Bay =

Bay in Arctic Canada

- Location within Nunavut
- Location: Hecla and Griper Bay
- Coordinates: 75°40′N 109°25′W
- Ocean/sea sources: Arctic Ocean
- Basin countries: Canada
- Settlements: Uninhabited

Sabine Bay is an Arctic waterway mainly in the Qikiqtaaluk Region, Nunavut, but partly in the Inuvik Region, Northwest Territories, Canada. Located off northern Melville Island's Sabine Peninsula, the bay is an arm of Hecla and Griper Bay. Eldridge Bay is to the north.
