= Weatherall Bay =

Bay in Nunavut, Canada

- Location within Nunavut
- Location: Byam Martin Channel
- Coordinates: 76°00′N 107°15′W
- Ocean/sea sources: Arctic Ocean
- Basin countries: Canada
- Settlements: Uninhabited

Weatherall Bay is an Arctic waterway in the Qikiqtaaluk Region, Nunavut, Canada. It is located in the Byam Martin Channel, northeast of Melville Island. Domett Point is at its mouth.
