= Vesey Hamilton Island =

Island in Nunavut, Canada

- Location within Nunavut Location within Canada

Geography
- Location: Northern Canada
- Coordinates: 76°55′N 109°11′W
- Archipelago: Arctic Archipelago

Administration
- Canada
- Territory: Nunavut
- Region: Qikiqtaaluk

Demographics
- Population: Uninhabited

Vesey Hamilton Island is an island of the Arctic Archipelago, in the territory of Nunavut. It lies in the Hazen Strait, north of Melville Island.

== History ==
The island was first surveyed and named for himself by the Royal Navy officer Richard Vesey Hamilton. Hamilton carried out a survey of the island while serving on the ship HMS Resolute.
