= Qikiqtaryuaq (Queen Maud Gulf) =

Uninhabited island in Nunavut, Canada

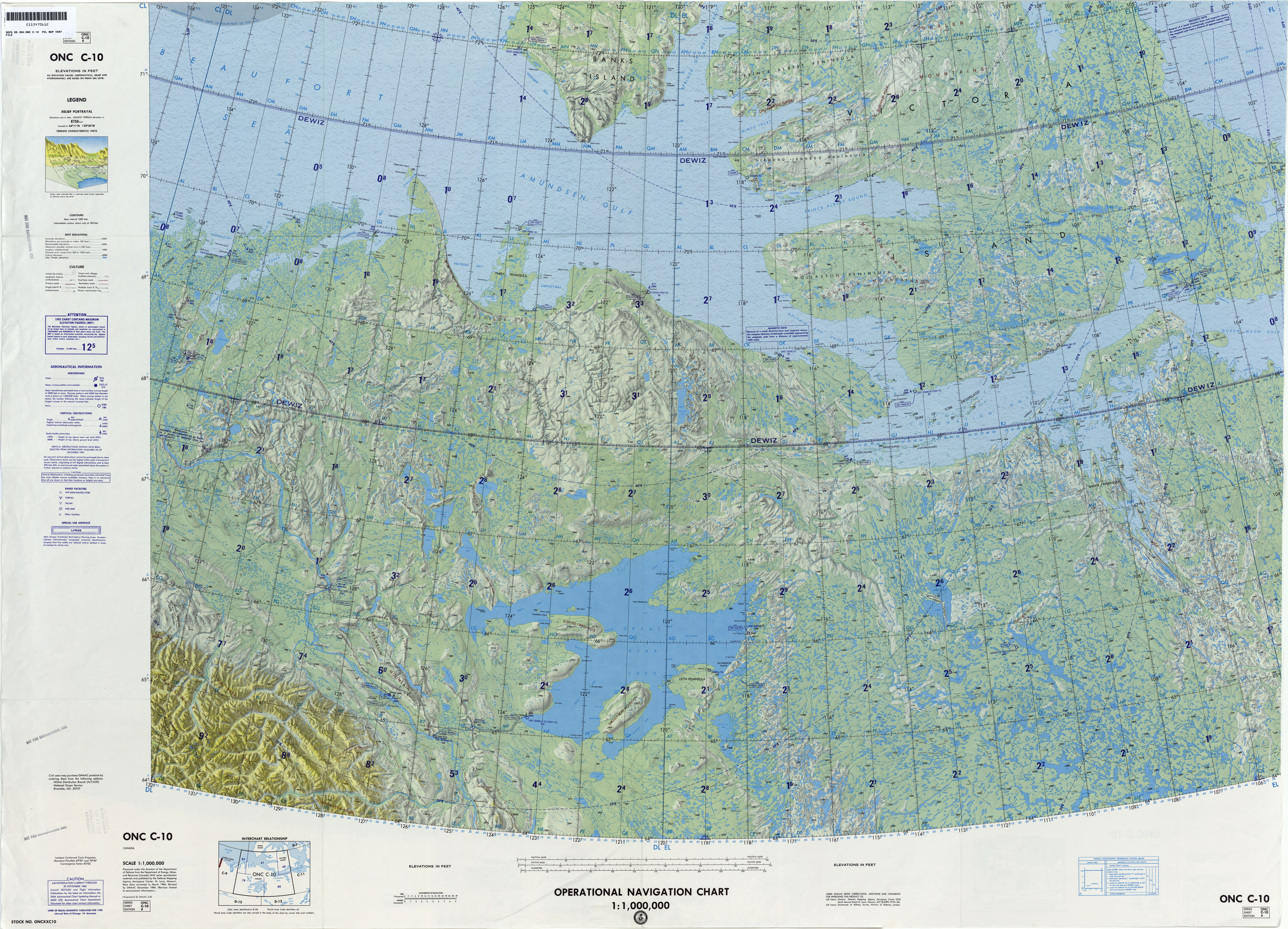
- Map including Qikiqtaryuaq

- Location within Nunavut Location within Canada

Geography
- Location: Northern Canada
- Coordinates: 68°30′02″N 104°42′44″W
- Archipelago: Arctic Archipelago
- Area: 381 km^{2} (147 sq mi)

Administration
- Canada
- Territory: Nunavut
- Region: Kitikmeot

Demographics
- Population: Uninhabited

Qikiqtaryuaq, formerly Melbourne Island, is an island located in the Kitikmeot Region, Nunavut, Canada. It lies at the western end of Queen Maud Gulf and is dominated by lakes and marshlands. The island has a total area of 381 km^{2} (147 sq mi) and is uninhabited.

Qikiqtaryuaq is made up of several small islands, including Kiillinnguyaq to the south and Victoria Island to the north. The region also includes numerous smaller islands that are home to a variety of wildlife such as polar bears, Arctic foxes, snow geese, walruses, seals, narwhals and beluga whales.

The waters surrounding Qikiqtaryuaq are rich in fish species such as Arctic char, lake trout and whitefish. The island also serves as an important breeding ground for seabirds such as northern fulmars and kittiwakes.

Inuit have inhabited the area around Qikiqtaryuaq since ancient times. They have traditionally hunted marine mammals such as seals and walrus in these waters for food and materials used for clothing and tools.

Each year, Qikiqtaryuaq is visited by many local people for hunting trips or fishing expeditions.
