= Napier Rock =

In Admiralty Bay, King George Island, South Shetland Islands

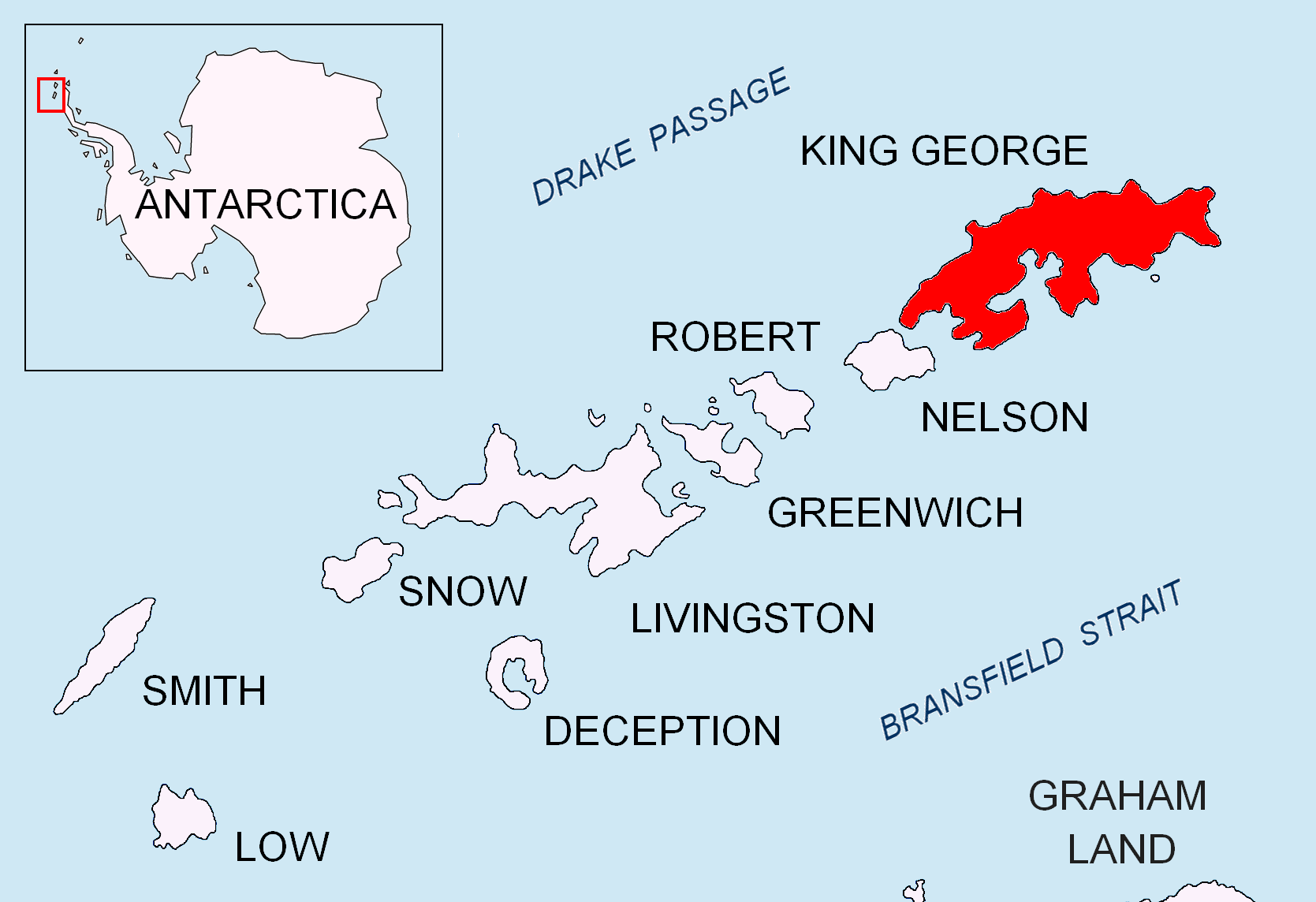
Location of King George Island in the South Shetland Islands.

Napier Rock (62°10′S 58°26′W) is a rock lying 1.75 nautical miles (3.2 km) east-southeast of Point Thomas in Admiralty Bay, King George Island, in the South Shetland Islands. Charted by the French Antarctic Expedition under Charcot, 1908–10. Named by the United Kingdom Antarctic Place-Names Committee (UK-APC) in 1960 for Ronald G. Napier (1925–1956) of Falkland Islands Dependencies Survey (FIDS), general assistant and handyman at the Signy Island station in 1955, and then leader at Admiralty Bay until he was drowned on March 24, 1956.
