= Panarctic Oils =

Canadian petroleum company (1966–2000)

Panarctic Oils Limited
- Industry: Petroleum
- Founded: 27 May 1966
- Defunct: 15 December 2000
- Headquarters: Panarctic Plaza, 815 8 Avenue SW, Calgary, Alberta

Panarctic Oils Limited was formed in 1966 as a result of the Canadian government's eagerness to encourage exploration of the Canadian Arctic islands and to assert Canadian sovereignty in the region. That company consolidated the interests of 75 companies and individuals with Arctic Islands land holdings plus the federal government as the major shareholder. It played an important part in the development of the petroleum industry in Canada.

== History ==
The company had a long and complicated birth. When the deal was complete in 1968, the Federal government held 45% ownership of the new company. Panarctic marked the Federal government's first direct entry into the oil and gas business, except for a brief period of involvement during World War II. After its formation, the company became the principal oil and gas operator in the Arctic Islands.

In 1976, the federal government transferred its stake to Petro-Canada who later raised its stake to 53%.

== Exploration ==
In that role it spent some $900 million and was the operator for perhaps three fourths of more than 175 wells drilled in the high Arctic. Panarctic began its exploration program with seismic work and then drilling in the Arctic Islands. By 1969 its Drake Point gas discovery was probably Canada's largest gas field. Over the next three years came other large gas fields in the islands. These and later discoveries established reserves of 17.5 trillion cubic feet (500 km^{3}) of dry, sweet natural gas. The company also discovered oil - on the islands at Bent Horn and Cape Allison, offshore at Cisco and Skate.

Exploration moved offshore when Panarctic began drilling wells from "ice islands" - not really islands, but platforms of thickened ice created in winter by pumping sea water on the polar ice pack. Oil was discovered in 1974 at Bent Horn N-72, the first well drilled on Cameron Island.

== Production ==
In 1985, the company became a commercial oil producer in the Arctic on an experimental scale. This began with a single 100,000 bbl (16,000 m^{3}) tanker load of oil from the Bent Horn oil field to Montreal via the MV Arctic. The MV Arctic carried two shipments per year until Bent Horn operations ceased in 1996.

== See also ==
- Panarctic Oils Flight 416
