= Moore Bay (Northwest Territories) =

Bay in the Northwest Territories, Canada

- Location within Northwest Territories
- Location: Prince Patrick Island
- Coordinates: 77°07′03″N 115°52′11″W
- Ocean/sea sources: Arctic Ocean
- Basin countries: Canada
- Settlements: Uninhabited

Moore Bay is a bay in the north-east of Prince Patrick Island, Northwest Territories, Canada.
