= Byam Martin Island =

Uninhabited island of the Arctic Archipelago

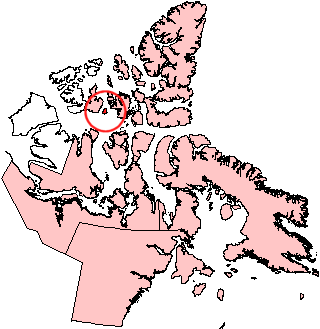
- Byam Martin Island, Nunavut

- Location within Nunavut Location within Canada

Geography
- Location: Northern Canada
- Coordinates: 75°12′N 104°17′W
- Archipelago: Queen Elizabeth Islands; Arctic Archipelago
- Area: 1,164.26 km^{2} (449.52 sq mi) (2026)
- Area rank: 45th in Canada & 299th worldwide
- Length: 46 km (28.6 mi)
- Width: 37 km (23 mi)
- Highest elevation: 153 m (502 ft)

Administration
- Canada
- Territory: Nunavut
- Region: Qikiqtaaluk Region

Demographics
- Population: Uninhabited

Byam Martin Island (BEI-uhm) is one of the uninhabited members of the Queen Elizabeth Islands in the Arctic Archipelago located on the northern side of the Viscount Melville Sound in the of Nunavut. It is separated from the eastern coast of Melville Island, 27 km (17 mi) to the west, by the Byam Martin Channel; and from Bathurst Island, 35 km (22 mi) to the northeast, by the Austin Channel. Byam Martin Island is 46 km (29 mi) long, 37 km (23 mi) wide, and measures 1,164.26 km^{2} (449.52 sq mi) in area. The island was named after Sir Thomas Byam Martin by Sir William Edward Parry in August 1819 during his first expedition to discover the Northwest Passage.
