= Crescent Island (Nunavut) =

Island in Nunavut, Canada

- Location within Nunavut Location within Canada

Geography
- Location: Northern Canada
- Coordinates: 76°58′59″N 097°19′59″W
- Archipelago: Queen Elizabeth Islands; Arctic Archipelago
- Area: 39 km^{2} (15 sq mi)

Administration
- Canada
- Territory: Nunavut

Demographics
- Population: Uninhabited

Crescent Island is a member of the Queen Elizabeth Islands and the Arctic Archipelago in the territory of Nunavut. It is an irregularly shaped island located at the northern mouth of the Penny Strait, and west of Napier Bay, Devon Island.
