= Fitzwilliam Strait =

The Fitzwilliam Strait (76°30′N 116°0′W) is a natural waterway through the central Canadian Arctic Archipelago in the Northwest Territories of Canada. It separates Prince Patrick Island (to the north-west), Melville Island (to the south-east) and Emerald Isle (to the north-east). It opens into the Kellett Strait to the south-west.
