= Kellett Strait =

Waterway in the Northwest Territories, Canada

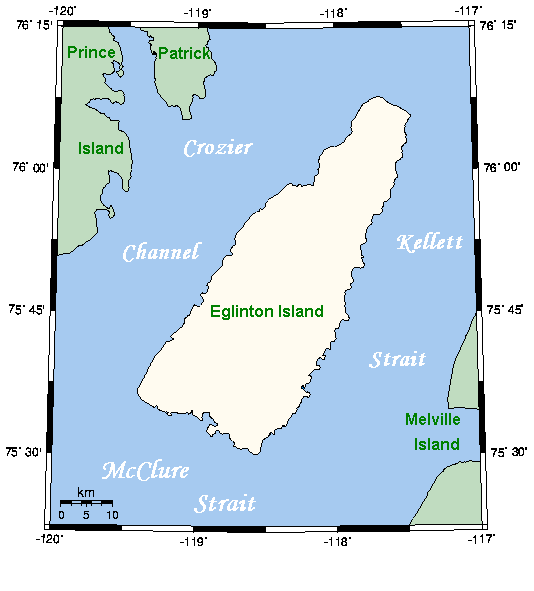
A map of Eglinton Island and the Kellet Strait in the Northwest Territories.

The Kellett Strait (75°45′N 117°30′W) is a natural waterway through the central Canadian Arctic Archipelago in the Northwest Territories of Canada. It separates Eglinton Island (to the west) and Melville Island (to the east). It opens into the McClure Strait to the south, and the Fitzwilliam Strait to the north.
