= Napier Road =

Napier Road may refer to:

- Napier Road, Karachi, Pakistan
- Napier Road, Singapore
