= 63rd meridian east =

Line of longitude

63rd meridian east

The meridian 63° east of Greenwich is a line of longitude that extends from the North Pole across the Arctic Ocean, Europe, Asia, the Indian Ocean, the Southern Ocean, and Antarctica to the South Pole.

The 63rd meridian east forms a great circle with the 117th meridian west.

== From Pole to Pole ==
Starting at the North Pole and heading south to the South Pole, the 63rd meridian east passes through:

Co-ordinates	Country, territory or sea	Notes
90°0′N 63°0′E	Arctic Ocean	
81°42′N 63°0′E	Russia	Eva Island, Franz Josef Land, Arkhangelsk Oblast
81°34′N 63°0′E	Arctic Ocean	
80°53′N 63°0′E	Russia	Graham Bell Island, Franz Josef Land, Arkhangelsk Oblast
80°40′N 63°0′E	Barents Sea	
76°14′N 63°0′E	Russia	Severny Island, Novaya Zemlya, Arkhangelsk Oblast
75°33′N 63°0′E	Kara Sea	
69°42′N 63°0′E	Russia	Nenetsia, Komi, Khantia-Mansia, Sverdlovsk Ob., Kurgan Ob., Chelyabinsk Ob.
54°6′N 63°0′E	Kazakhstan	Kostanay Reg., Aktobe Reg., Qaraghandy Reg., Qyzylorda Reg.
43°37′N 63°0′E	Uzbekistan	Navoiy Region, Bukhara Region
39°40′N 63°0′E	Turkmenistan	Lebap Region, Mary Region
35°25′N 63°0′E	Afghanistan	Badghis, Herat, Farah, Nimruz, Helmand
29°26′N 63°0′E	Pakistan	Balochistan
27°12′N 63°0′E	Iran	Sistan-va-Baluchestan
26°39′N 63°0′E	Pakistan	Balochistan
25°12′N 63°0′E	Indian Ocean	Passing west of the island of Rodrigues, Mauritius
60°0′S 63°0′E	Southern Ocean	
67°36′S 63°0′E	Antarctica	Australian Antarctic Territory, claimed by Australia

== See also ==
- 62nd meridian east
- 64th meridian east
