= Desbarats Strait =

Strait in Nunavut

Coordinates: 76°52′N 104°10′W

Desbarats Strait is a natural waterway through the central Canadian Arctic Archipelago in the territory of Nunavut. It separates the Findlay Group of islands (to the north) from Cameron Island (to the south).
