= Hazen Strait =

Strait in Northern Canada

The Hazen Strait (77°00′N 110°30′W) is a natural waterway through the Queen Elisabeth Islands in the Canadian Arctic Archipelago. It separates Mackenzie King Island in the Northwest Territories (to the north) from Melville Island's Cape George Richards on the Sabine Peninsula in Nunavut (to the south). All of the islands that Hazen Strait separates are uninhabited. Vesey Hamilton Island is located in the middle of Hazen Strait towards the Nunavut side. Hazen Strait is near to the Hecla and Griper Bay in Melville Island. As of 2000, no land on any of the 3 islands bordering the Hazen Strait are Inuit owned, and none of the islands are inhabited permanently.

Hazen Strait is frozen over 9-10 months of the year, with some winter ice near the south coast of Mackenzie King Island remaining year-round per a 1962 survey. The strait is also fairly dense with ice, with the ice discharge towards the southeast being minimal. The area around the strait is thought to have 4 bbl of oil and 56 tcf of natural gas under it, and directly under the strait are the Whitefish and Roche Point natural gas fields.

The Hazen Strait VFR/VNC area is named after Hazen Strait. The Hazen marine area is located in the Western Arctic marine region, and covers around half of the Hazen Strait proper. The other half of the strait falls under the Ballantyne marine area.
