= Stefansson Island =

Uninhabited island in the Arctic Archipelago

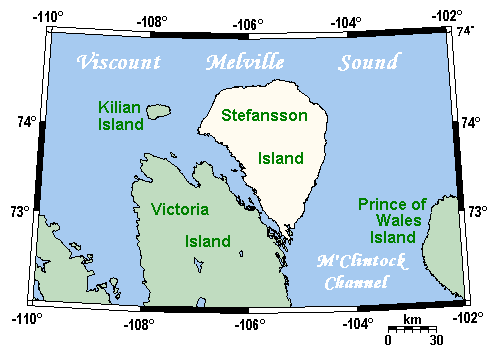
- Stefansson Island and surrounding area

- Location within Nunavut Location within Canada

Geography
- Location: Viscount Melville Sound
- Coordinates: 73°20′N 105°45′W
- Archipelago: Arctic Archipelago
- Area: 4,490.11 km^{2} (1,733.64 sq mi) (2026)
- Area rank: 27th in Canada & 126th worldwide
- Highest elevation: 256 m (840 ft)
- Highest point: unnamed

Administration
- Canada
- Territory: Nunavut
- Region: Kitikmeot

Demographics
- Population: 0

Stefansson Island is an uninhabited island in the Arctic Archipelago in the Kitikmeot Region of Nunavut, Canada. It has a total area of 4,490.11 km^{2} (1,733.64 sq mi), making it the 126th largest island in the world, and Canada's 27th largest island. The island is located in Viscount Melville Sound, with M'Clintock Channel to the east. It lies just off Storkerson Peninsula on Victoria Island, separated by the Goldsmith Channel. Stefansson Island's highest mount is 256 m (840 ft). A weather station, at 73°45′56″N 105°17′44″W, is located on the northern part of the island as part of an automated weather station array operated by Environment and Climate Change Canada in the Arctic. The first European sighting of the island was in 1917 by Storker T. Storkerson who was travelling with Canadian explorer Vilhjalmur Stefansson (1879–1962), for whom the island was named.
