= Chapman Islands =

Island group in Nunavut, Canada

- Location within Nunavut Location within Canada

Geography
- Location: Bathurst Inlet
- Coordinates: 67°54′N 109°15′W
- Archipelago: Canadian Arctic Archipelago
- Area: 211 km^{2} (81 sq mi)

Administration
- Canada
- Territory: Nunavut
- Region: Kitikmeot

Demographics
- Population: Uninhabited

The uninhabited Chapman Islands are members of the Canadian Arctic Archipelago in the territory of Nunavut. They are located in the Bathurst Inlet, just south of the Coronation Gulf. They lie south of the Wilmot Islands.
