= Porden Islands =

Island group in Nunavut, Canada

- Location within Nunavut Location within Canada

Geography
- Coordinates: 68°13′N 108°37′W
- Archipelago: Arctic Archipelago

Administration
- Canada
- Territory: Nunavut
- Region: Kitikmeot

Demographics
- Population: Uninhabited

The Porden Islands are members of the Arctic Archipelago in the territory of Nunavut. They are located in the Coronation Gulf, south of the Kent Peninsula.

They were discovered in 1822 by Arctic explorer John Franklin and named after William Porden and his daughter Eleanor Anne Porden, whom he later married.
