= Stockport Islands =

Island group in Nunavut, Canada

- Location within Nunavut Location within Canada

Geography
- Location: Bathurst Inlet
- Coordinates: 67°46′N 109°0′W
- Archipelago: Arctic Archipelago
- Area: 235 km^{2} (91 sq mi)

Administration
- Canada
- Territory: Nunavut
- Region: Kitikmeot

Demographics
- Population: Uninhabited

The uninhabited Stockport Islands are members of the Arctic Archipelago in the territory of Nunavut. They are located in Bathurst Inlet, east of Daniel Moore Bay, and south of Lewes Island.

Stockport Islands are named after Stockport, a large town in Greater Manchester, England, where the European explorers were born and raised.
