= Maclean Strait =

Strait in Nunavut, Canada

Maclean Strait (77°30′N 103°30′W) is a natural waterway through the Canadian Arctic Archipelago in the territory of Nunavut. It separates the Findlay Group (to the south-west) from Ellef Ringnes Island and King Christian Island (to the north-east).
