= Kiillinnguyaq =

Peninsula in Nunavut, Canada

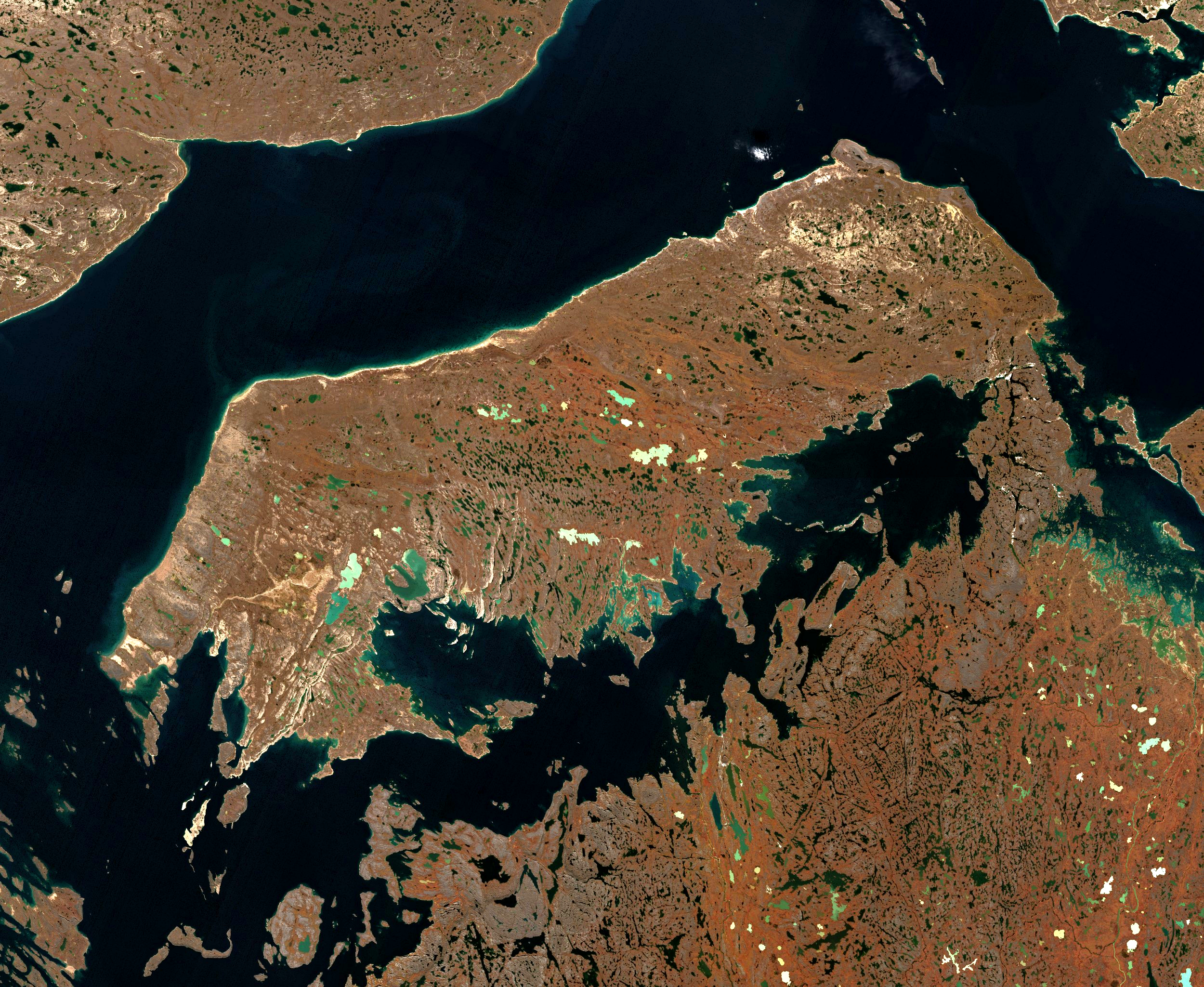
- Sentinel-2 image (2022)

- Location within Nunavut

Geography
- Location: Dease Strait
- Coordinates: 68°32′51″N 107°09′30″W
- Archipelago: Arctic Archipelago

Administration
- Canada
- Territory: Nunavut
- Region: Kitikmeot

Demographics
- Population: Uninhabited

Kiillinnguyaq, formerly the Kent Peninsula, is a large Arctic peninsula, almost totally surrounded by water, in the Kitikmeot Region of Nunavut. Were it not for a 8.0 kilometres (5 miles) isthmus at the southeast corner it would be a long island parallel to the coast. From the isthmus it extends 169 km (105 mi) westward into the Coronation Gulf. To the south, Tariyunnuaq, previously Melville Sound, separates it from the mainland. To the north is Dease Strait and then Victoria Island. To the west is Coronation Gulf and to the east, Queen Maud Gulf. Cape Flinders marks the western tip of the peninsula, Cape Franklin is at the northwestern point, and Hiiqtinniq, formerly Cape Alexander marks the northeastern point.

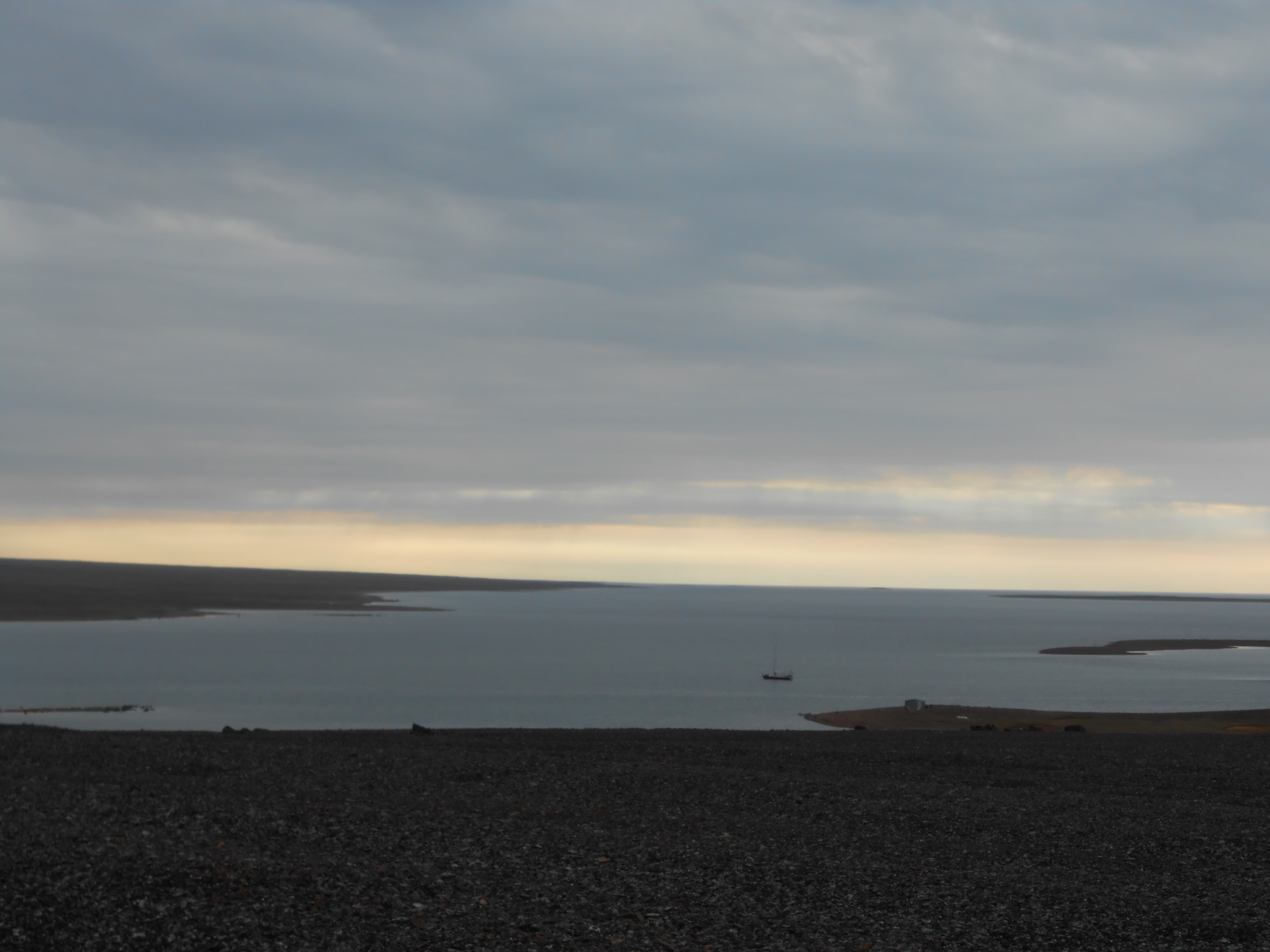
Alexander Point, Kent Peninsula, now Kiillinnguyaq in Nunavut, Canada

Historically, the Umingmuktogmiut subgroup of the Copper Inuit had a permanent community at Umingmaktok on the peninsula's western coast. A landmark for early explorers was Cape Turnagain or Point Turnagain, located about 40 km (25 mi) northeast of Cape Flinders, near Cape Franklin at about 68°36′30″N 108°18′30″W. In 1821, John Franklin reached the point from the west, at the most northerly point of the disastrous Coppermine expedition and then turned back. In 1838, Thomas Simpson nearly reached the same point, but was blocked by ice and had to walk 160 km (100 mi) east. In 1839, the coast was clear of ice and Simpson followed the entire coast eastward.
