= Byam Martin Channel =

Canadian waterway

The Byam Martin Channel (76°30′N 106°00′W) is a natural waterway through the central Canadian Arctic Archipelago Qikiqtaaluk Region, Nunavut, Canada. It separates Mackenzie King Island and Melville Island (to the west) from Lougheed Island, Cameron Island, Île Vanier, Massey Island and Île Marc (to the east). To the south it opens into Byam Channel and Austin Channel.
