= Parry Channel =

Natural waterway through the central Canadian Arctic Archipelago

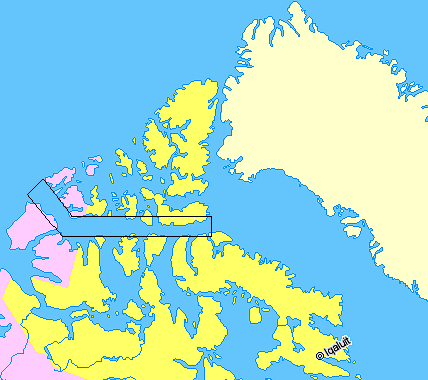
- Map indicating the Parry Channel. The east–west part is normally passable in late summer, but the west end which turns northwest (the McClure Strait) is normally filled with ice.

- Location of Parry Channel
- Location: Nunavut and Northwest Territories, Canada
- Coordinates: 74°15′N 94°00′W
- Basin countries: Canada

The Parry Channel (Inuktitut: ᑕᓪᓗᕈᑎᐅᑉ ᐃᒪᖓ, Tallurutiup Imanga) is a natural waterway through the central Canadian Arctic Archipelago. Its eastern two-thirds lie in the territory of Nunavut, while its western third (west of 110° West) lies in the Northwest Territories. It runs east to west, connecting Baffin Bay in the east with the Beaufort Sea in the west. Its eastern end is the only practical entrance to the Northwest Passage. Its western end would be a natural exit from the archipelago were it not filled with ice. The channel separates the Queen Elizabeth Islands to the north from the rest of Nunavut.

Named parts of the Channel are, from east to west, Lancaster Sound, Barrow Strait, Viscount Melville Sound and the McClure Strait. On the south are Baffin Island, Admiralty Inlet and the Brodeur Peninsula of Baffin Island, Prince Regent Inlet which leads to the large Gulf of Boothia, Somerset Island, Peel Sound which is the main route south, Prince of Wales Island, the ice-choked M'Clintock Channel, Victoria Island, the narrow Prince of Wales Strait and Banks Island. On the north are Devon Island, Wellington Channel, Cornwallis Island, McDougall Sound, Bathurst Island, Melville Island and Prince Patrick Island.

Parry Channel is named after Arctic explorer William Edward Parry, who in 1819 got as far as Melville Island before being blocked by ice at the McClure Strait. The next ship to get this far west was part of the Edward Belcher expedition in 1850.
