= Viscount Melville Sound =

Waterway in the Northwest Territories and Nunavut, Canada

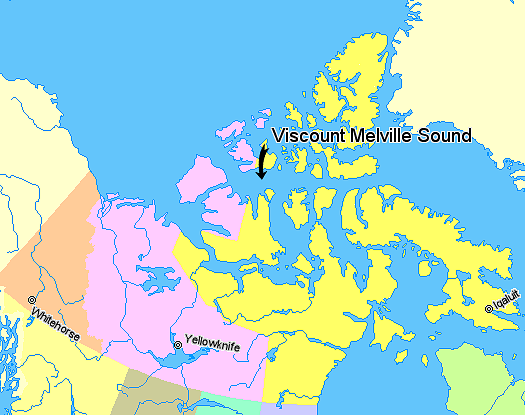
Viscount Melville Sound, Nunavut.
Nunavut
Northwest Territories
Yukon Territory
Regions outside Canada (Alaska, Greenland)
- Location within Nunavut
- Coordinates: 74°15′N 105°00′W
- Basin countries: Canada
- Settlements: Uninhabited

Viscount Melville Sound, formerly Melville Sound, is an arm of the Arctic Ocean in the Kitikmeot Region, Nunavut and the Inuvik Region, Northwest Territories, Canada. Forming part of the Parry Channel, it separates Victoria Island and Prince of Wales Island from the Queen Elizabeth Islands. East of the sound, via Barrow Strait, lies Lancaster Sound, leading into Baffin Bay; westward lies the M'Clure Strait and the Arctic Ocean / Beaufort Sea. The sound is a part of the Northwest Passage.

In 1854, Edward Belcher abandoned his ship, HMS Resolute, in the sound while searching for Sir John Franklin and his lost expedition. In 1855 HMS Resolute was found drifting off Baffin Island, and was later ceremonially returned to Queen Victoria.
