= Melville Island (Northwest Territories and Nunavut) =

Uninhabited island of the Arctic Archipelago

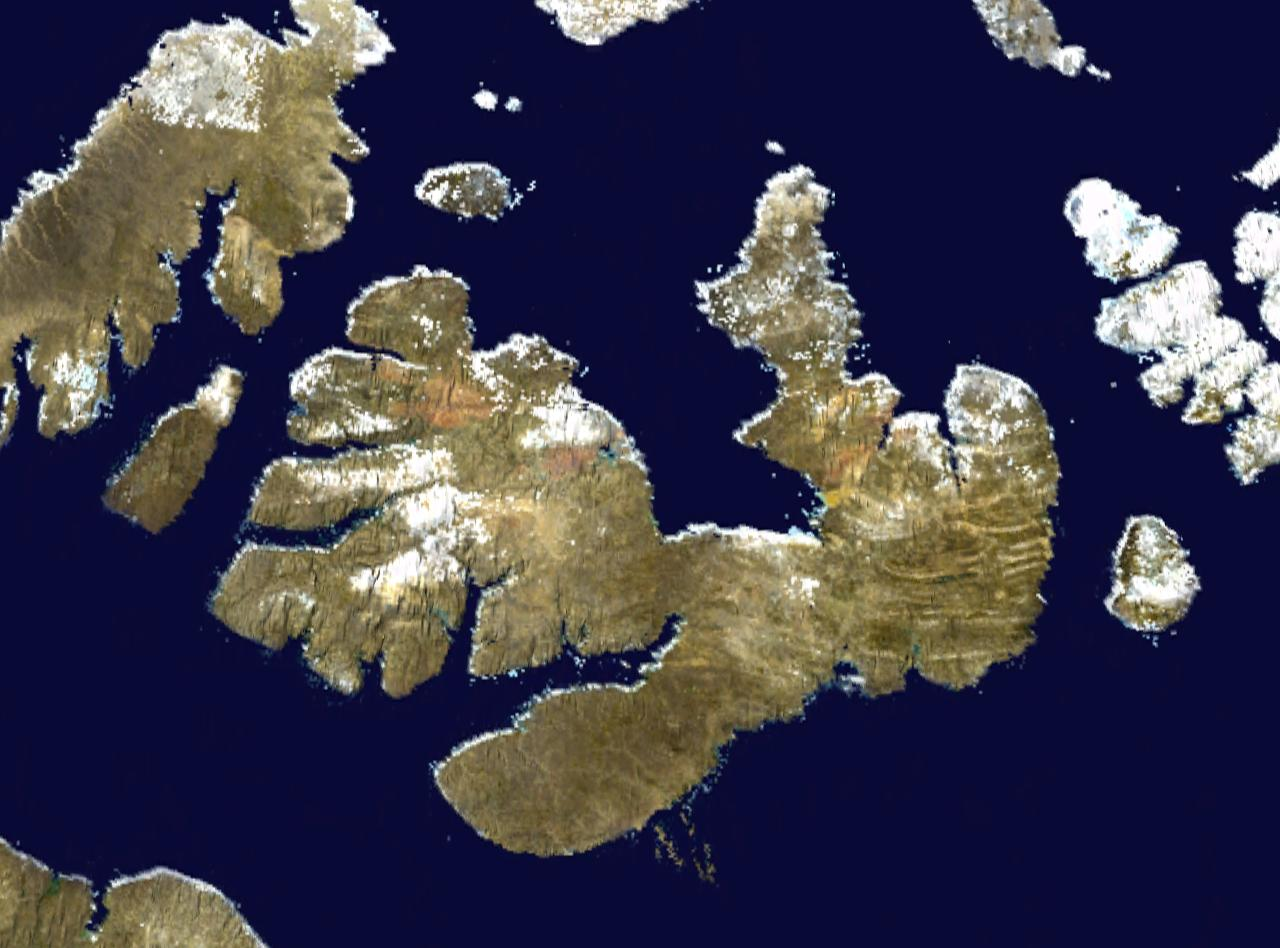
- NASA satellite photograph of Melville Island

- Location within Northwest Territories Location within Nunavut Location within Canada
- Etymology: The Viscount Melville

Geography
- Location: Canadian Arctic
- Coordinates: 75°30′02″N 111°30′09″W
- Archipelago: Queen Elizabeth Islands
- Adjacent to: Lancaster Sound; Viscount Melville Sound
- Area: 42,330.26 km^{2} (16,343.80 sq mi) (2026)
- Area rank: 8th in Canada & 33rd worldwide
- Length: 341 km (211.9 mi)
- Width: 210–292 km (130–181 mi)
- Highest elevation: 762 m (2500 ft)

Administration
- Canada
- Territories: Northwest Territories, Nunavut
- Regions: Qikiqtaaluk, Inuvik

Demographics
- Population: 0 (uninhabited) (2026)

Melville Island (Note: French: île Melville, Inuktitut: ᐃᓗᓪᓕᖅ, Ilulliq) is an uninhabited member of the Queen Elizabeth Islands of the Arctic Archipelago. With an area of 42,330.26 km^{2} (16,343.80 sq mi), it is the 33rd largest island in the world and Canada's eighth largest island. Mountains on Melville Island, some of the largest in the western Canadian Arctic, reach heights of 750 m (2,460 ft). Melville Island is shared by the Northwest Territories, which is responsible for the western half of the island, and Nunavut, which is responsible for most of the eastern half. The border runs along the 110th meridian west. The eastern half of the island contains two subnational pene-exclaves that lie west of the 110th meridian and form part of the Northwest Territories. These can be reached by land only from Nunavut.

== Geography ==
The island is located between Prince Patrick Island in the northwest, Eglinton Island in the west, and Byam Martin Island in the east. Across Viscount Melville Sound in the south lies Victoria Island. The island has little or no vegetation. Where continuous vegetation occurs, it usually consists of hummocks of mosses, lichens, grasses, and sedges. The only woody species, the dwarf willow, grows as a dense twisted mat crawling along the ground. Ibbett Bay is a fjord on the western side of the island, running approximately 55 km long.

== Fauna ==
A diverse animal population exists: polar bear, Peary caribou, muskox, northern collared lemming, Arctic wolf, Arctic fox, Arctic hare, and ermine (stoat) are common. A 2003 sighting of a grizzly bear and grizzly tracks by an expedition from the University of Alberta represent the most northerly reports of grizzly bears ever recorded. Melville Island is one of two major breeding grounds for the brant goose. DNA analysis and field observations suggest that these birds may be distinct from other brant stocks. Numbering 4,000–8,000 birds, this could be one of the rarest goose stocks in the world.

== History ==
The first documented European to visit Melville Island was the British explorer, Sir William Parry, in 1819. He was forced to spend the winter at what is now called "Winter Harbour" until 1 August 1820, owing to freeze-up of the sea. The island is named for Robert Dundas, 2nd Viscount Melville, who was First Sea Lord at the time. In the search for Franklin's lost expedition, its east coast was explored as far as Bradford Point by Abraham Bradford in 1851, while its north and west coasts were surveyed by Francis Leopold McClintock, Richard Vesey Hamilton, and George Henry Richards in 1853. Ships from Captain Edward Belcher's rescue expedition, such as HMS Resolute, would winter at Dealey Island, just south of Melville Island. It was also from here that a sledging expedition located the trapped HMS Investigator, which had been immobilized in Mercy Bay at the north of Banks Island for two years. In staged sledging expeditions over the next several months, the survivors sledged north to Dealey Island. Investigator and its steam tender, HMS Pioneer, had to spend another winter at Dealey, with the hope that they could break free of the ice in the following Spring. However, they too could not travel east, so Captain Belcher ordered that all of his ships be abandoned. The crew and survivors then sledged hundreds of miles east to Beechey Island where his last remaining ship, HMS North Star was not trapped and could help ferry everyone back to England. All of the men were finally returned home by 1854. On January 30, 1920, the Pioche Record reported that Icelandic explorer Vilhjalmur Stefansson discovered a lost cache from the 1853 McClintock expedition on Melville Island. Clothing and food from the cache was in excellent condition despite the harsh arctic conditions. In 1930, a large sandstone rock marking Parry's 1819 wintering site at Winter Harbour, approximately 5.5 metres (18 ft) long and 3 metres (10 ft) high, was designated a national historic site of Canada.

== Fossil fuel deposits ==
Melville has surfaced as a candidate for natural gas deposits. The island was believed to have deposits of coal and oil shale since the first half of the 20th century. The first Canadian Arctic island exploratory well was spudded in 1961 at Winter Harbour. It drilled Lower Paleozoic strata to a total depth of 3,823 m (12,543 ft). In the 1970s, the northern portion of the island on the east side of the Sabine Peninsula proved to contain a major gas field, known as Drake Point. The lease was owned by Panarctic Oils, a joint operation with the Canadian Government.

== See also ==
- Lists of islands
