= 96th meridian west =

Line of longitude

96th meridian west

The meridian 96° west of Greenwich is a line of longitudethat extends from the North Pole across the Arctic Ocean, North America, the Gulf of Mexico, the Pacific Ocean, the Southern Ocean, and Antarctica to the South Pole.

The 96th meridian west forms a great circle with the 84th meridian east.

Within the United States, the 96th meridian is often viewed as the eastern boundary of the Great Plains and of a region between the 96th and 100th meridians across which the climate changes significantly, with arid deserts to the west and wetter temperate climates to the east.

== From Pole to Pole ==
Starting at the North Pole and heading south to the South Pole, the 96th meridian west passes through:

Co-ordinates	Country, territory or sea	Notes
90°0′N 96°0′W	Arctic Ocean	
80°41′N 96°0′W	Canada	Nunavut — Axel Heiberg Island
79°41′N 96°0′W	Massey Sound	
78°28′N 96°0′W	Canada	Nunavut — Bjarnason Island and Amund Ringnes Island
77°53′N 96°0′W	Hendriksen Strait	
77°44′N 96°0′W	Canada	Nunavut — Cornwall Island
77°29′N 96°0′W	Belcher Channel	
77°3′N 96°0′W	Canada	Nunavut — Devon Island
76°26′N 96°0′W	Queens Channel	
75°36′N 96°0′W	Canada	Nunavut — Little Cornwallis Island and Cornwallis Island
74°53′N 96°0′W	Parry Channel	
73°55′N 96°0′W	Peel Sound	Passing just west of Somerset Island, Nunavut, Canada (at 73°41′N 95°41′W); Passing just east of Prince of Wales Island, Nunavut, Canada (at 72°25′N 96°16′W)
71°26′N 96°0′W	Canada	Nunavut — Boothia Peninsula (mainland)
69°49′N 96°0′W	James Ross Strait	
69°35′N 96°0′W	Wellington Strait	Passing just west of Matty Island, Nunavut, Canada (at 69°30′N 95°58′W); Passing just east of the Tennent Islands, Nunavut, Canada (at 69°28′N 96°3′W)
69°21′N 96°0′W	Rae Strait	
69°14′N 96°0′W	Canada	Nunavut — King William Island
68°36′N 96°0′W	Simpson Strait	
68°15′N 96°0′W	Canada	Nunavut — McCrary Isthmus (mainland)
68°12′N 96°0′W	Chantrey Inlet	
67°50′N 96°0′W	Canada	Nunavut — Montreal Island
67°49′N 96°0′W	Chantrey Inlet	
67°15′N 96°0′W	Canada	Nunavut — mainland Manitoba — from 60°0′N 96°0′W
49°0′N 96°0′W	United States	Minnesota; Iowa — from 43°30′N 96°0′W; Nebraska — from 41°32′N 96°0′W, for about 4 km Iowa — from 41°31′N 96°0′W, for about 4 km Nebraska — from 41°29′N 96°0′W, passing through Omaha (at 41°15′N 96°0′W); Kansas — from 40°0′N 96°0′W; Oklahoma — from 37°0′N 96°0′W, passing through Tulsa (at 36°9′N 96°0′W); Texas — from 33°51′N 96°0′W
28°35′N 96°0′W	Gulf of Mexico	
19°2′N 96°0′W	Mexico	Veracruz — from 19°4′N 96°0′W; Oaxaca — from 18°14′N 96°0′W
15°47′N 96°0′W	Pacific Ocean	
60°0′S 96°0′W	Southern Ocean	
71°56′S 96°0′W	Antarctica	Unclaimed territory

== See also ==
- 95th meridian west
- 97th meridian west
