= Hovgaard =

Hovgaard can refer to:

== People ==
- Andreas Peter Hovgaard (1853–1910), Danish Arctic explorer, brother of William Hovgaard
- Hans Hovgaard (1895–1980), Danish gymnast
- William Hovgaard (1857–1950), Danish-American naval design expert

== Places ==
- Hovgaard Island (Antarctica)
- Hovgaard Island (Greenland)
- Hovgaard Island (Kara Sea) (Ostrov Khovgarda), Nordenskiöld Archipelago, Russia
- Hovgaard Islands, Nunavut, Canada
