= Humboldt Channel =

Watercourse in Nunavut, Canada

- Interactive map of Humboldt Channel
- Location: Kitikmeot Region, Nunavut, Canada
- Coordinates: 69°27′N 96°30′W
- Type: Channel
- Part of: Canadian Arctic Archipelago
- Primary inflows: James Ross Strait
- Primary outflows: Rae Strait
- Basin countries: Canada
- Islands: Tennent Islands

The Humboldt Channel is a natural waterway through the central Canadian Arctic Archipelago in Kitikmeot Region, Nunavut. It separates King William Island (to the west) from the Tennent Islands (to the east). To the north the strait opens into the James Ross Strait; to the south it opens into the Rae Strait.
