= 95th meridian west =

Line of longitude

95th meridian west

The meridian 95° west of Greenwich is a line of longitude that extends from the North Pole across the Arctic Ocean, North America, the Gulf of Mexico, Central America, the Pacific Ocean, the Southern Ocean, and Antarctica to the South Pole.

The 95th meridian west forms a great circle with the 85th meridian east.

== From Pole to Pole ==
Starting at the North Pole and heading south to the South Pole, the 95th meridian west passes through:

Co-ordinates	Country, territory or sea	Notes
90°0′N 95°0′W	Arctic Ocean	
81°2′N 95°0′W	Canada	Nunavut — Axel Heiberg Island, Bjarnason Island and Axel Heiberg Island again
79°16′N 95°0′W	Massey Sound	
78°25′N 95°0′W	Canada	Nunavut — Amund Ringnes Island
78°1′N 95°0′W	Hendriksen Strait	
77°47′N 95°0′W	Canada	Nunavut — Cornwall Island
77°28′N 95°0′W	Belcher Channel	
76°59′N 95°0′W	Canada	Nunavut — Devon Island
76°14′N 95°0′W	Queens Channel	
76°6′N 95°0′W	Canada	Nunavut — Dundas Island
76°3′N 95°0′W	Queens Channel	Passing just west of Baillie-Hamilton Island, Nunavut, Canada (at 75°55′N 94°52′W)
75°37′N 95°0′W	Canada	Nunavut — Cornwallis Island
74°40′N 95°0′W	Parry Channel	Barrow Strait — passing just west of Griffith Island, Nunavut, Canada (at 74°31′N 95°13′W)
74°2′N 95°0′W	Canada	Nunavut — Somerset Island and the Boothia Peninsula (mainland)
69°37′N 95°0′W	Rae Strait	Passing just east of King William Island, Nunavut, Canada (at 68°52′N 95°9′W)
68°3′N 95°0′W	Canada	Nunavut — mainland Manitoba — from 60°0′N 95°0′W; Ontario — from 52°56′N 95°0′W
49°22′N 95°0′W	United States	Minnesota — Northwest Angle
49°11′N 95°0′W	Lake of the Woods	
48°58′N 95°0′W	United States	Minnesota; Iowa — from 43°30′N 95°0′W; Missouri — from 40°34′N 95°0′W; Kansas — from 39°54′N 95°0′W; Missouri — from 39°40′N 95°0′W; Kansas — from 39°26′N 95°0′W; Oklahoma — from 37°0′N 95°0′W; Texas — from 33°51′N 95°0′W, the mainland and Galveston Island
29°10′N 95°0′W	Gulf of Mexico	
18°34′N 95°0′W	Mexico	Veracruz; Oaxaca — from 17°20′N 95°0′W
16°12′N 95°0′W	Pacific Ocean	
60°0′S 95°0′W	Southern Ocean	
72°32′S 95°0′W	Antarctica	Unclaimed territory

== See also ==
- 94th meridian west
- 96th meridian west
