= Shepherd Bay =

Bay in Nunavut, Canada

- Location within Nunavut
- Location: Rasmussen Basin
- Coordinates: 68°50′N 93°50′W
- Ocean/sea sources: Arctic Ocean
- Basin countries: Canada
- Settlements: Uninhabited

Shepherd Bay is an Arctic waterway in the Kitikmeot Region, Nunavut, Canada. Located off the western Boothia Peninsula , the bay is on the north side of Rasmussen Basin, south of the Rae Strait. The community of Taloyoak lies 79 km (49 mi) to the north.

The former Distant Early Warning Line site, now an unmanned North Warning System station, known as CAM-3 or Shepherd Bay, is located here at 68°47′34″N 093°26′25″W. Established as DEW Line Auxiliary site, 1957. It was an expansive facility with an airstrip and dock facility for resupplying. DEW operations ended in July 1989; minimally-attended NWS Long Range Radar installed July 1989. Appears that much of the former DEW site facilities remain in use, buildings appear in good repair. Shepherd Bay SRRS Airport (ICAO: CYUS) is listed in the Canada Flight Supplement as abandoned. The site is serviced by helicopter from the site at Cambridge Bay.
