= Hovgaard Island =

Hovgaard Island may refer to:

- Hovgaard Island (Antarctica)
- Hovgaard Island (Greenland)
- Hovgaard Island (Kara Sea), Siberia, Russia

== See also ==
- Hovgaard Islands, Canada
