= Beverly Islands =

Uninhabited Canadian Arctic island group

- Location within Nunavut Location within Canada

Geography
- Location: Rae Strait
- Coordinates: 69°15′N 095°43′W
- Archipelago: Canadian Arctic Archipelago

Administration
- Canada
- Territory: Nunavut
- Region: Kitikmeot

Demographics
- Population: Uninhabited

The Beverly Islands are an uninhabited Canadian Arctic island group in the Kitikmeot Region, Nunavut. The islands are located in the Rae Strait between the southern tip of the eastern arm of Matty Island, and Peel Inlet on King William Island. The Tennent Islands are to the northwest.
