= Wellington Strait =

The Wellington Strait (69°28′N 095°59′W) (not to be confused with Wellington Channel) is a natural waterway through the central Canadian Arctic Archipelago in the territory of Nunavut. It separates the Tennent Islands (to the west) from Matty Island (to the east). To the north, the strait opens into the James Ross Strait; to the south it opens into the Rae Strait.

The strait is covered in ice as soon as early August, but lacks icebergs.
