= 94th meridian west =

Line of longitude

94th meridian west (interactive map)

The meridian 94° west of Greenwich is a line of longitude that extends from the North Pole across the Arctic Ocean, North America, the Gulf of Mexico, Central America, the Pacific Ocean, the Southern Ocean, and Antarctica to the South Pole.

The 94th meridian west forms a great circle with the 86th meridian east.

In the United States, the meridian runs just east of, and approximately parallel to, part of the border of Texas with Arkansas and Louisiana.

== From Pole to Pole ==
Starting at the North Pole and heading south to the South Pole, the 94th meridian west passes through:

Co-ordinates	Country, territory or sea	Notes
90°0′N 94°0′W	Arctic Ocean	
81°21′N 94°0′W	Canada	Nunavut — Axel Heiberg Island
78°53′N 94°0′W	Norwegian Bay	
77°44′N 94°0′W	Canada	Nunavut — Cornwall Island
77°27′N 94°0′W	Belcher Channel	
76°55′N 94°0′W	Canada	Nunavut — Devon Island
76°15′N 94°0′W	Wellington Channel	
75°28′N 94°0′W	Canada	Nunavut — Cornwallis Island
74°39′N 94°0′W	Parry Channel	Barrow Strait
74°8′N 94°0′W	Canada	Nunavut — Somerset Island
72°10′N 94°0′W	Gulf of Boothia	Brentford Bay
71°48′N 94°0′W	Canada	Nunavut — mainland
68°48′N 94°0′W	Rasmussen Basin	
68°27′N 94°0′W	Canada	Nunavut — mainland
61°5′N 94°0′W	Hudson Bay	
58°46′N 94°0′W	Canada	Manitoba; Ontario — from 53°32′N 94°0′W
48°39′N 94°0′W	United States	Minnesota; Iowa — from 43°30′N 94°0′W; Missouri — from 40°34′N 94°0′W; Arkansas — from 36°30′N 94°0′W; Louisiana — from 33°1′N 94°0′W; Texas — from 31°58′N 94°0′W
29°40′N 94°0′W	Gulf of Mexico	
18°15′N 94°0′W	Mexico	Tabasco; Veracruz — from 17°50′N 94°0′W; Oaxaca — from 17°9′N 94°0′W; Chiapas — from 16°48′N 94°0′W
16°0′N 94°0′W	Pacific Ocean	
60°0′S 94°0′W	Southern Ocean	
72°31′S 94°0′W	Antarctica	Unclaimed territory

== See also ==
- 93rd meridian west
- 95th meridian west
