= Rasmussen Basin =

Bay in Nunavut, Canada

Massey Sound
- Interactive map of Massey Sound
- Coordinates: 68°26′4″N 094°45′29″W
- Basin countries: Canada

Rasmussen Basin is a natural waterway through the Canadian Arctic Archipelago in Kitikmeot Region, Nunavut. It separates King William Island (to the north-west) from the mainland. To the north the basin opens into the Rae Strait, to the west into the Simpson Strait, and to the south into Chantrey Inlet. The Hovgaard Islands group is located in the western part of Rasmussen Basin.
