= 84th meridian =

84th meridian may refer to:

- 84th meridian east, a line of longitude east of the Greenwich Meridian
- 84th meridian west, a line of longitude west of the Greenwich Meridian

84th meridian west	84th meridian east
