= 88th meridian =

88th meridian may refer to:

- 88th meridian east, a line of longitude east of the Greenwich Meridian
- 88th meridian west, a line of longitude west of the Greenwich Meridian

88th meridian west	88th meridian east
