= 85th meridian =

85th meridian may refer to:

- 85th meridian east, a line of longitude east of the Greenwich Meridian
- 85th meridian west, a line of longitude west of the Greenwich Meridian

85th meridian west	85th meridian east
