= 83rd meridian =

83rd meridian may refer to:

- 83rd meridian east, a line of longitude east of the Greenwich Meridian
- 83rd meridian west, a line of longitude west of the Greenwich Meridian

83rd meridian west	83rd meridian east
