= 92nd meridian =

92nd meridian may refer to:

- 92nd meridian east, a line of longitude east of the Greenwich Meridian
- 92nd meridian west, a line of longitude west of the Greenwich Meridian

92nd meridian west	92nd meridian east
