= Clarence Island =

Clarence Island may refer to:

- Clarence Island (South Shetland Islands), Antarctica
- Clarence Island, Chile
- Clarence Islands, Nunavut, Canada
