= 86th meridian =

86th meridian may refer to:

- 86th meridian east, a line of longitude east of the Greenwich Meridian
- 86th meridian west, a line of longitude west of the Greenwich Meridian

86th meridian west	86th meridian east
