= 87th meridian =

87th meridian may refer to:

- 87th meridian east, a line of longitude east of the Greenwich Meridian
- 87th meridian west, a line of longitude west of the Greenwich Meridian

87th meridian west	87th meridian east
