= 93rd meridian west =

Line of longitude

93rd meridian west

The meridian 93° west of Greenwich is a line of longitudethat extends from the North Pole across the Arctic Ocean, North America, the Gulf of Mexico, Central America, the Pacific Ocean, the Southern Ocean, and Antarctica to the South Pole.

The 93rd meridian west forms a great circle with the 87th meridian east.

== From Pole to Pole ==
Starting at the North Pole and heading south to the South Pole, the 93rd meridian west passes through:

Co-ordinates	Country, territory or sea	Notes
90°0′N 93°0′W	Arctic Ocean	
81°20′N 93°0′W	Canada	Nunavut — Axel Heiberg Island
78°36′N 93°0′W	Norwegian Bay	Passing just east of Cornwall Island, Nunavut, Canada (at 77°39′N 93°4′W)
76°37′N 93°0′W	Canada	Nunavut — Devon Island
76°16′N 93°0′W	Wellington Channel	
74°40′N 93°0′W	Parry Channel	Barrow Strait
74°9′N 93°0′W	Canada	Nunavut — Somerset Island
72°46′N 93°0′W	Gulf of Boothia	
71°22′N 93°0′W	Canada	Nunavut — mainland
62°4′N 93°0′W	Hudson Bay	
58°20′N 93°0′W	Canada	Manitoba; Ontario — from 54°13′N 93°0′W
48°27′N 93°0′W	United States	Minnesota, passing through Saint Paul (at 44°57′N 93°0′W); Iowa — from 43°30′N 93°0′W; Missouri — from 40°35′N 93°0′W; Arkansas — from 36°30′N 93°0′W; Louisiana — from 33°1′N 93°0′W
29°43′N 93°0′W	Gulf of Mexico	
18°26′N 93°0′W	Mexico	Tabasco; Chiapas — from 17°33′N 93°0′W, passing just east of Tuxtla Gutiérrez.
15°17′N 93°0′W	Pacific Ocean	
60°0′S 93°0′W	Southern Ocean	
72°30′S 93°0′W	Antarctica	Unclaimed territory

== See also ==
- 92nd meridian west
- 94th meridian west
