= James Ross Strait =

Strait in Nunavut, Canada

Coordinates: 69°50′N 096°30′W

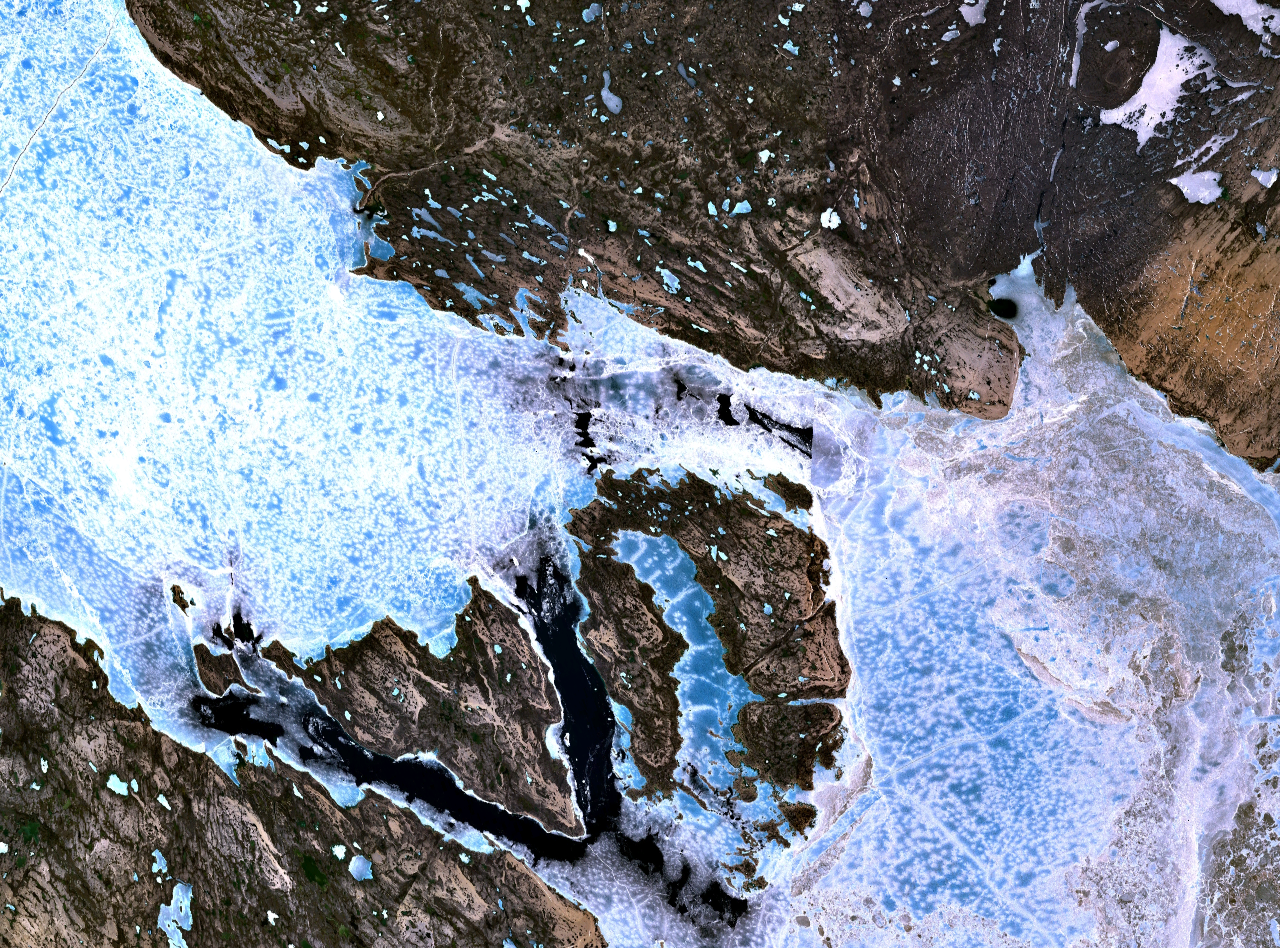
NASA Landsat image of the strait. The triangular Tennent Island is to the west, and Matty Island lies to the east.

James Ross Strait, an arm of the Arctic Ocean, is a channel between King William Island and the Boothia Peninsula in the Canadian territory of Nunavut. 180 km (110 mi) long, and 48 km (30 mi) to 64 km (40 mi) wide, it connects M'Clintock Channel to the Rae Strait to the south. Islands in the channel include the Clarence Islands, Tennent Islands, Beverley Island, and Matty Island.

A number of polar explorers searching for the Northwest Passage sailed through the strait, including Roald Amundsen. The strait is named after British polar explorer James Clark Ross.
