= Tennent Islands =

Island group in Canada

- Location within Nunavut Location within Canada

Geography
- Location: Rae Strait
- Coordinates: 69°30′N 096°30′W
- Archipelago: Arctic Archipelago
- Area: 308 km^{2} (119 sq mi)
- Highest elevation: 55 m (180 ft)
- Highest point: Un-named

Administration
- Canada
- Territory: Nunavut
- Region: Kitikmeot

Demographics
- Population: Uninhabited

The Tennent Islands are an uninhabited Canadian Arctic island group in the Kitikmeot Region, Nunavut. The islands are located in Rae Strait between the Clarence Islands and Beverly Islands. Thomson Point on King William Island lies 3.5 km (2.2 mi) away, across the Humboldt Channel. Matty Island lies 3.7 km (2.3 mi) to the east, separated by the Wellington Strait. Boothia Peninsula's Oscar Bay is to the northeast.

The Tennent Islands are low-lying and lake-studded. They, as well as Port Emerson, a two-mile-wide (3.2 km) harbour, were named in honour of Emerson Tennent by Sir John Ross during his second Arctic voyage.
