= Andreas Peter Hovgaard =

Royal Danish Navy officer and explorer

Andreas Hovgaard
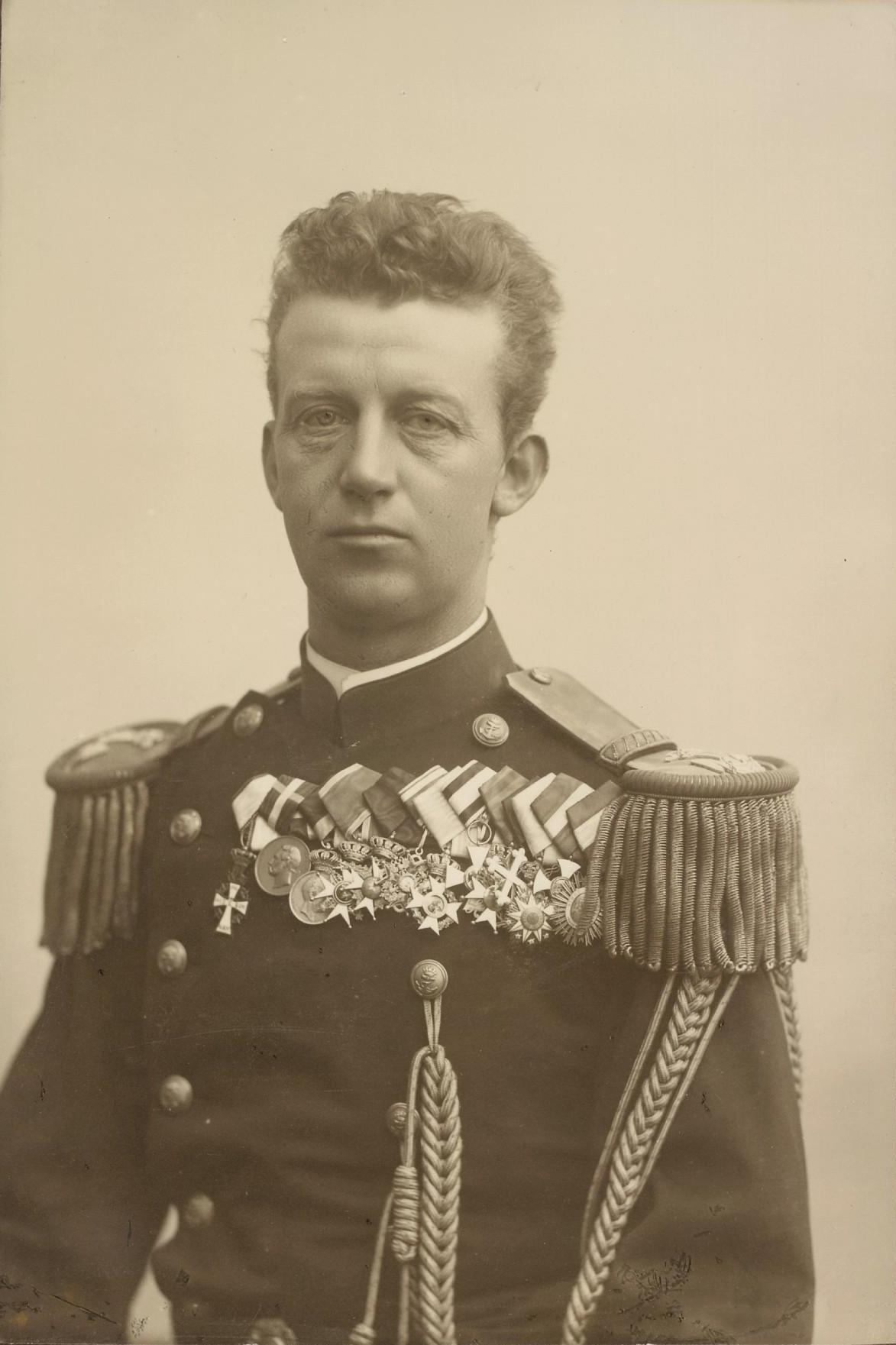
- Hovgaard in 1901
- Born: 1 November 1853; Aarhus, Denmark
- Died: 15 March 1910 (aged 56); Copenhagen, Denmark
- Relatives: William Hovgaard's brother
- Military career
- Allegiance: Denmark
- Branch: Royal Danish Navy
- Service years: 1871–1909
- Rank: Commander
- Commands: Mail steamer Thyra; Cruiser Heimdall; Coastal Defense Ship Olfert Fischer
- Awards: Service Medal; Order of the Dannebrog; Dannebrogordenens Hæderstegn

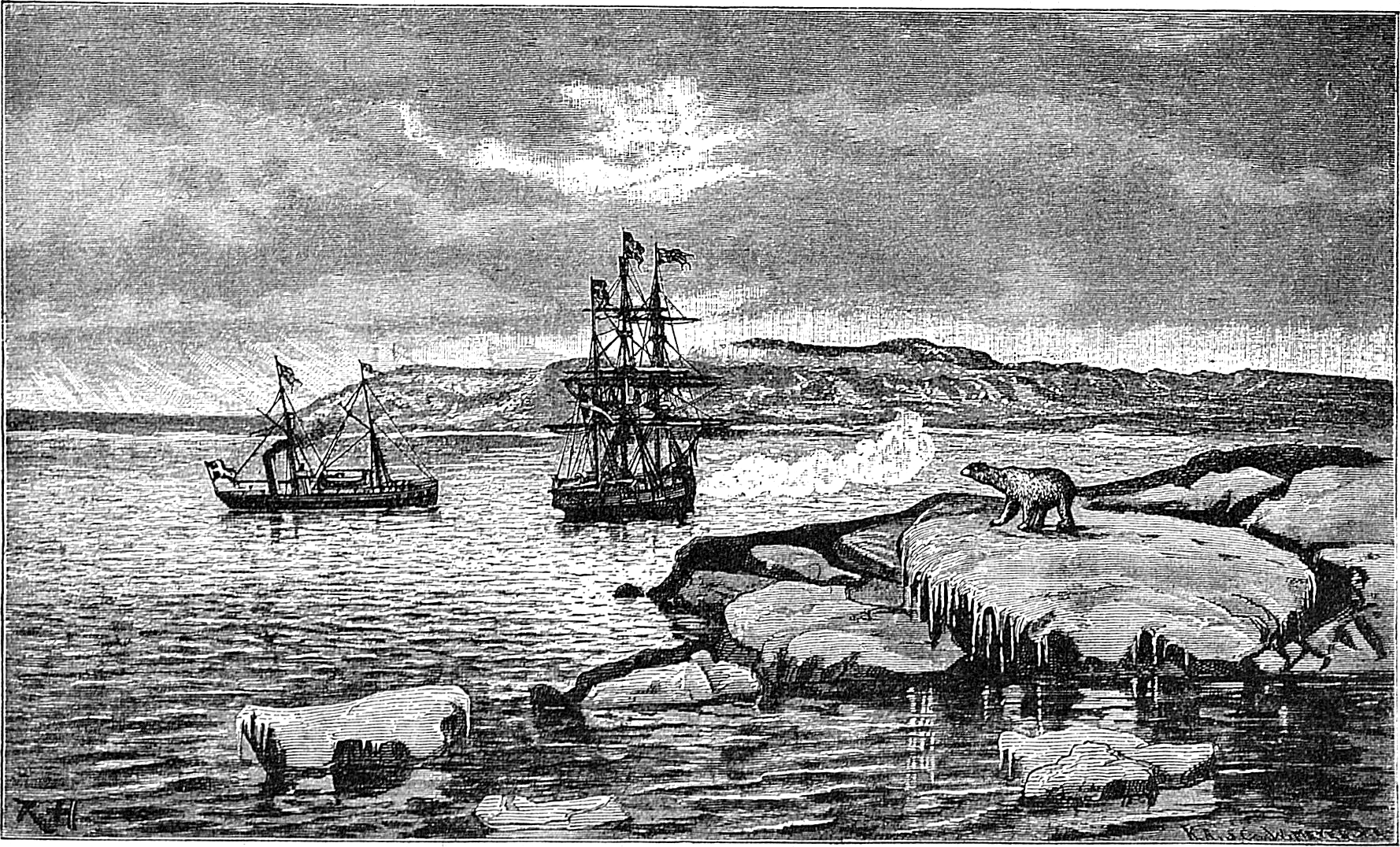
1907 Russian engraving of the Varna (left) and the Dijmphna in the Kara Sea before both vessels got stuck in the ice.

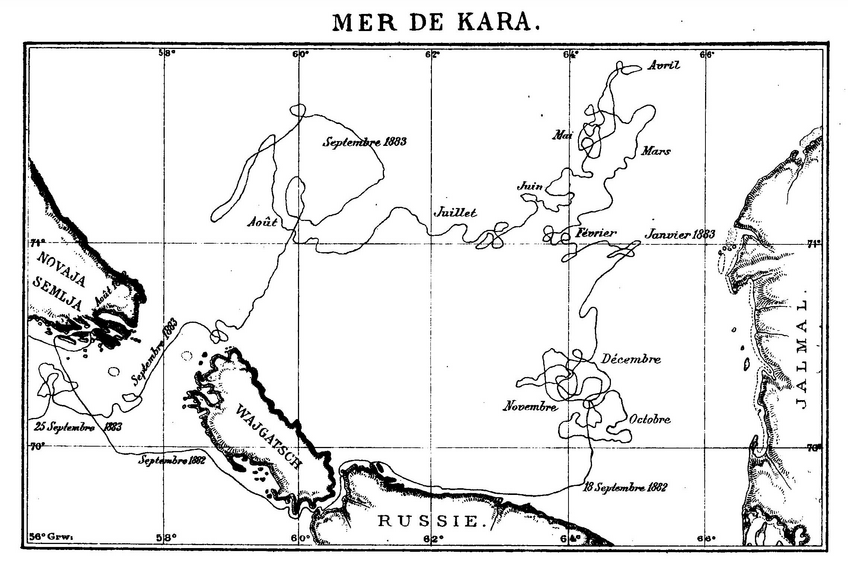
Map of the drift of the Dijmphna in the Kara Sea 1882–83.

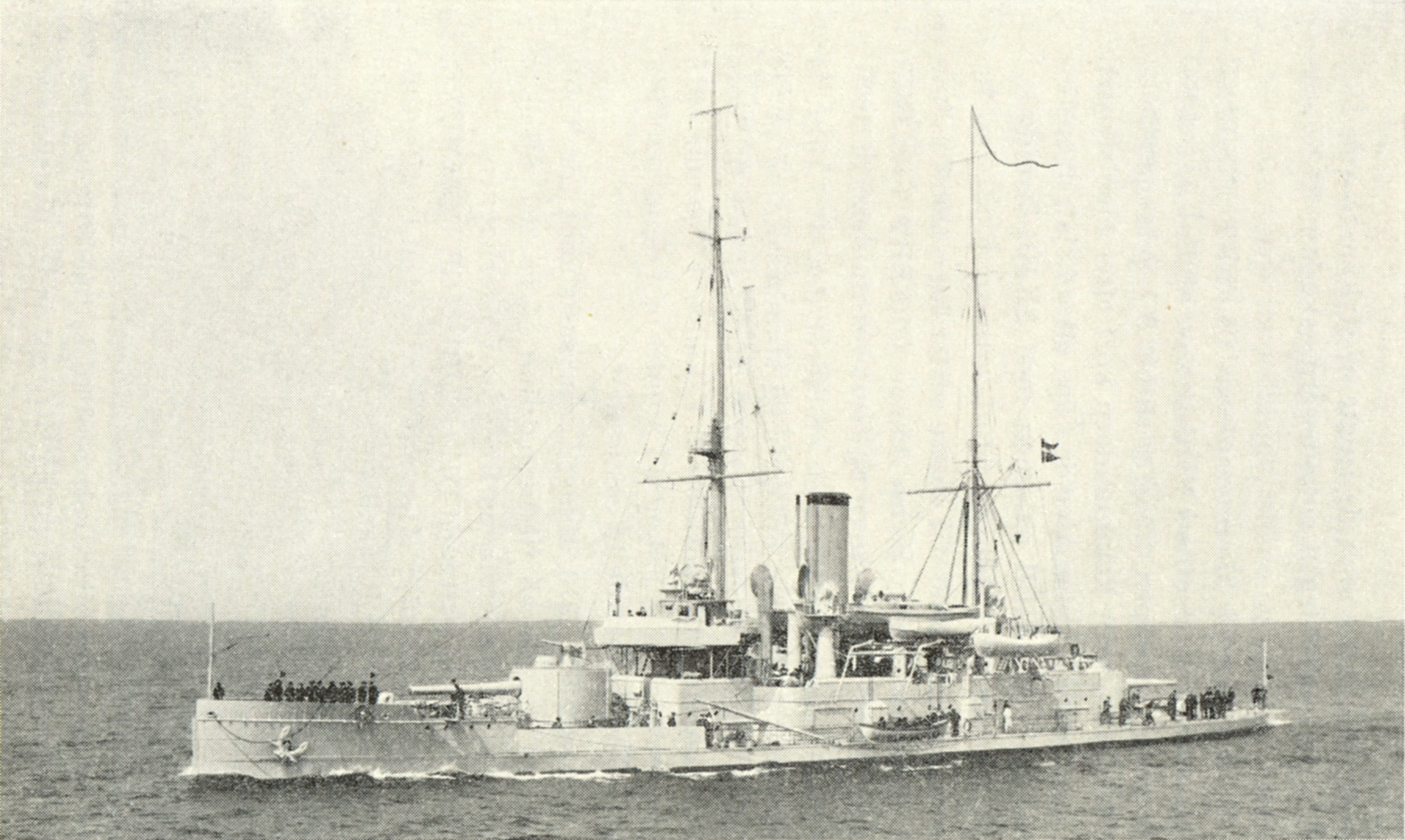
Coastal Defense Ship HDMS Olfert Fischer (1900–1938).

Commander Andreas Peter Hovgaard (1 November 1853 – 15 March 1910) was a Royal Danish Navy officer and explorer. Hovgaard became a sub-lieutenant of the Danish Navy in 1874, rising to the rank of lieutenant in 1876, captain in 1888 and commander in 1901. He retired from active service in 1909.

== Career ==
Andreas Hovgaard was the son of Ole Anton Hovgaard (1821–1891) and Louise Charlotte Munch (1823–1872). Little is known about his early life, except that he joined the Danish Navy and quickly rose through the ranks. In 1878 Hovgaard, as a young lieutenant, became a member of Adolf Erik Nordenskiöld's Vega Expedition, in which he was in charge of making meteorological as well as geomagnetic observations. Shortly after returning to Denmark, he married Sophie Christiane Nielsen (1856–1934) and published his report Nordenskiölds rejse omkring Asien og Europa about the first Arctic expedition to have navigated successfully through the Northeast Passage.

In 1882 Hovgaard led the Dijmphna Expedition, an Arctic survey expedition to explore the unknown northeastern limits of the Kara Sea on the steamship Dijmphna, financed by Danish trader Augustin Gamél (1839–1904), who would also later assist Fridtjof Nansen. The Dijmphna became stuck in the ice off Dikson while trying to rescue the Dutch Polar Expedition's ship Varna, which was surveying the mouth of the Yenisei. During the winter of 1882/83, it began a long drift in the Kara Sea that prevented the expedition from accomplishing its goals. The ship was able to return home only with the 1883 summer thaw, the Varna becoming lost.

In 1887 he served aboard the Danish ironclad Dannebrog. From 1890 to 1893 Hovgaard was the captain of the mail steamer Thyra, which plied the route to the Faroe Islands and Iceland. Later he commanded the cruiser HDMS Heimdall and the coastal defense ship HMDS Olfert Fischer.

Andreas Hovgaard was the president of the Danish Naval Officers Association (Søofficers-Foreningen) between 1907 and 1909.

== Honours ==
Hovgaard Island in Greenland, Hovgaard Island (Ostrov Khovgarda) in the Nordenskiöld Archipelago of the Kara Sea, Russia, Hovgaard Island in Antarctica, and the Hovgaard Islands in Nunavut, Canada, were all named after him.

- Danish Service medal in gold (1883)
- Order of the Dannebrog; Knight (1880); Commander 2nd Class (1907)
- Dannebrogordenens Hæderstegn (1904)

== Works ==
- Nordenskiölds Reise omkring Asien og Europa - Populairt fremstillet efter mine Dagböger, 1915 (Danish)
- Forslag til en dansk arktisk expedition, Gyldendal, Copenhagen 1882
- Dijmphna-Expeditionen 1882–83. Rapporter til Dijmphna’s Rheder, Kopenhagen 1884 (Danish)
- Die Eiszustände im Karischen Meere, Gotha 1884 (German)
- Compasset i Jernskibe, Kopenhagen 1888 (Danish)
- Under Islands Kyst, 1906 (Danish)

== See also ==
- Arctic exploration
- Cartographic expeditions to Greenland
- Severnaya Zemlya
