= 83rd meridian east =

Line of longitude

83rd meridian east (interactive map)

The meridian 83° east of Greenwich is a line of longitude that extends from the North Pole across the Arctic Ocean, Asia, the Indian Ocean, the Southern Ocean, and Antarctica to the South Pole.

The 83rd meridian east forms a great circle with the 97th meridian west.

== From Pole to Pole ==
Starting at the North Pole and heading south to the South Pole, the 83rd meridian east passes through:

Co-ordinates	Country, territory or sea	Notes
90°0′N 83°0′E	Arctic Ocean	
81°8′N 83°0′E	Kara Sea	Passing just east of Uyedineniya Island (at 77°28′N 82°40′E)
75°58′N 83°0′E	Russia	Krasnoyarsk Krai — Troynoy Island
75°55′N 83°0′E	Kara Sea	
74°5′N 83°0′E	Russia	Krasnoyarsk Krai — Vostochnyy Island
74°4′N 83°0′E	Kara Sea	
73°38′N 83°0′E	Russia	Krasnoyarsk Krai; Yamalo-Nenets Autonomous Okrug — from 66°53′N 83°0′E; Khanty-Mansi Autonomous Okrug — from 62°36′N 83°0′E; Tomsk Oblast — from 60°58′N 83°0′E; Novosibirsk Oblast — from 56°31′N 83°0′E; Altai Krai — from 53°57′N 83°0′E
50°54′N 83°0′E	Kazakhstan	
47°5′N 83°0′E	People's Republic of China	East Turkestan; Tibet — from 35°29′N 83°0′E
29°40′N 83°0′E	Nepal	
27°27′N 83°0′E	India	Uttar Pradesh; Chhattisgarh — from 23°52′N 83°0′E; Odisha — from 21°9′N 83°0′E; Andhra Pradesh — from 18°23′N 83°0′E
17°29′N 83°0′E	Indian Ocean	
60°0′S 83°0′E	Southern Ocean	
66°15′S 83°0′E	Antarctica	Australian Antarctic Territory, claimed by Australia

== See also ==
- 82nd meridian east
- 84th meridian east
