= Hovgaard Islands =

Island group in Nunavut, Canada

- Location within Nunavut Location within Canada

Geography
- Location: Northern Canada
- Coordinates: 68°29′N 095°44′W
- Archipelago: Canadian Arctic Archipelago
- Major islands: Aqitqiqtuun Island
- Area: 10 km^{2} (3.9 sq mi)

Administration
- Canada
- Territory: Nunavut
- Region: Kitikmeot

Demographics
- Population: 0

The Hovgaard Islands are a Canadian Arctic island group in the Kitikmeot Region of Nunavut Territory. They were named after Andreas Hovgaard, a Polar explorer and officer of the Danish Navy who led an expedition to the Kara Sea on steamship Dijmphna in 1882–83.

The islands lie in the Rasmussen Basin, equal distance between Gjoa Haven, King William Island (20 km (12 mi) to the north), and Pechell Point, Adelaide Peninsula (20 km (12 mi)).

The waters surrounding the islands are known amongst the Netsilik Inuit for an abundance of blubbery marine mammals.
