= 84th meridian east =

Line of longitude

84th meridian east

The meridian 84° east of Greenwich is a line of longitude that extends from the North Pole across the Arctic Ocean, Asia, the Indian Ocean, the Southern Ocean, and Antarctica to the South Pole.

The 84th meridian east forms a great circle with the 96th meridian west.

== From Pole to Pole ==
Starting at the North Pole and heading south to the South Pole, the 84th meridian east passes through:

Co-ordinates	Country, territory or sea	Notes
90°0′N 84°0′E	Arctic Ocean	
81°8′N 84°0′E	Kara Sea	
74°1′N 84°0′E	Russia	Krasnoyarsk Krai — Rastorguyev Island
73°59′N 84°0′E	Kara Sea	
73°41′N 84°0′E	Russia	Krasnoyarsk Krai; Yamalo-Nenets Autonomous Okrug — from 65°46′N 84°0′E; Khanty-Mansi Autonomous Okrug — from 62°25′N 84°0′E; Tomsk Oblast — from 60°50′N 84°0′E; Novosibirsk Oblast — from 56°1′N 84°0′E; Altai Krai — from 54°7′N 84°0′E; Altai Republic — from 51°9′N 84°0′E Altai Krai — from 51°4′N 84°0′E
50°42′N 84°0′E	Kazakhstan	Passing through Lake Zaysan
46°59′N 84°0′E	People's Republic of China	Xinjiang; Tibet — from 35°25′N 84°0′E
29°17′N 84°0′E	Nepal	
27°27′N 84°0′E	India	Bihar; Uttar Pradesh — from 27°6′N 84°0′E; Bihar — from 26°32′N 84°0′E; Uttar Pradesh — from 26°27′N 84°0′E; Bihar - from 25°36′N 84°0′E; Jharkhand — from 24°38′N 84°0′E; Chhattisgarh — from 23°38′N 84°0′E; Jharkhand — from 23°30′N 84°0′E; Chhattisgarh — from 23°21′N 84°0′E; Odisha — from 22°32′N 84°0′E; Chhattisgarh — from 22°28′N 84°0′E; Odisha — from 22°22′N 84°0′E; Andhra Pradesh — from 18°48′N 84°0′E
18°14′N 84°0′E	Indian Ocean	
60°0′S 84°0′E	Southern Ocean	
66°26′S 84°0′E	Antarctica	Australian Antarctic Territory, claimed by Australia

== See also ==
- 83rd meridian east
- 85th meridian east
