= 87th meridian east =

Line of longitude

87th meridian east (interactive map)

The meridian 87° east of Greenwich is a line of longitude that extends from the North Pole across the Arctic Ocean, Asia, the Indian Ocean, the Southern Ocean, and Antarctica to the South Pole.

The 87th meridian east forms a great circle with the 93rd meridian west.

== From Pole to Pole ==
Starting at the North Pole and heading south to the South Pole, the 87th meridian east passes through:

Co-ordinates	Country, territory or sea	Notes
90°0′N 87°0′E	Arctic Ocean	
81°8′N 87°0′E	Kara Sea	
75°8′N 87°0′E	Russia	Krasnoyarsk Krai; Tomsk Oblast — from 59°53′N 87°0′E; Kemerovo Oblast — from 56°32′N 87°0′E; Altai Krai — from 53°3′N 87°0′E; Kemerovo Oblast — from 52°54′N 87°0′E; Altai Krai — from 52°45′N 87°0′E; Altai Republic — from 52°39′N 87°0′E
49°18′N 87°0′E	Kazakhstan	East Kazakhstan Region
49°6′N 87°0′E	People's Republic of China	Xinjiang; Tibet — from 36°18′N 87°0′E; Passing just east of Mount Everest summit (at 27°59′18″N 86°55′31″E)
27°57′N 87°0′E	Nepal	Province 1 Province 2 — from 26°42′N 87°0′E
26°32′N 87°0′E	India	Bihar; Jharkhand — from 24°37′N 87°0′E; West Bengal — from 23°51′N 87°0′E; Odisha — from 22°2′N 87°0′E
21°25′N 87°0′E	Indian Ocean	
20°45′N 87°0′E	India	Odisha
20°39′N 87°0′E	Indian Ocean	
60°0′S 87°0′E	Southern Ocean	
66°6′S 87°0′E	Antarctica	Australian Antarctic Territory, claimed by Australia

Next westward: 86th meridian east	87th meridian east forms a great circle with 93rd meridian west	Next eastward: 88th meridian east
