= 85th meridian east =

Line of longitude

85th meridian east

The meridian 85° east of Greenwich is a line of longitude that extends from the North Pole across the Arctic Ocean, Asia, the Indian Ocean, the Southern Ocean, and Antarctica to the South Pole.

The 85th meridian east forms a great circle with the 95th meridian west.

== From Pole to Pole ==
Starting at the North Pole and heading south to the South Pole, the 85th meridian east passes through:

Co-ordinates	Country, territory or sea	Notes
90°0′N 85°0′E	Arctic Ocean	
81°8′N 85°0′E	Kara Sea	
74°35′N 85°0′E	Russia	Krasnoyarsk Krai — Plavnikovyye Islands
74°17′N 85°0′E	Kara Sea	
73°42′N 85°0′E	Russia	Krasnoyarsk Krai; Yamalo-Nenets Autonomous Okrug — from 64°56′N 85°0′E; Krasnoyarsk Krai — from 64°53′N 85°0′E; Yamalo-Nenets Autonomous Okrug — from 64°50′N 85°0′E; Krasnoyarsk Krai — from 62°36′N 85°0′E; Khanty-Mansi Autonomous Okrug — from 61°46′N 85°0′E; Krasnoyarsk Krai — from 61°5′N 85°0′E; Tomsk Oblast — from 59°53′N 85°0′E; Kemerovo Oblast — from 56°6′N 85°0′E; Novosibirsk Oblast — from 54°55′N 85°0′E; Kemerovo Oblast — from 54°48′N 85°0′E; Novosibirsk Oblast — from 54°33′N 85°0′E; Altai Krai — from 54°24′N 85°0′E; Altai Republic — from 51°30′N 85°0′E
50°3′N 85°0′E	Kazakhstan	For about 6 km
50°0′N 85°0′E	Russia	Altai Republic — for about 11 km
49°54′N 85°0′E	Kazakhstan	
46°55′N 85°0′E	People's Republic of China	Xinjiang; Tibet — from 35°44′N 85°0′E
28°36′N 85°0′E	Nepal	
26°54′N 85°0′E	India	Bihar; Jharkhand — from 24°25′N 85°0′E; Odisha — from 22°28′N 85°0′E; Jharkhand — from 22°6′N 85°0′E; Odisha — from 22°4′N 85°0′E
19°19′N 85°0′E	Indian Ocean	
60°0′S 85°0′E	Southern Ocean	
66°21′S 85°0′E	Antarctica	Australian Antarctic Territory, claimed by Australia

== See also ==
- 84th meridian east
- 86th meridian east
- Eighty Five East Ridge
