= 86th meridian east =

Line of longitude

86th meridian east

The meridian 86° east of Greenwich is a line of longitude that extends from the North Pole across the Arctic Ocean, Asia, the Indian Ocean, the Southern Ocean, and Antarctica to the South Pole.

The 86th meridian east forms a great circle with the 94th meridian west.

== From Pole to Pole ==
Starting at the North Pole and heading south to the South Pole, the 86th meridian east passes through:

Co-ordinates	Country, territory or sea	Notes
90°0′N 86°0′E	Arctic Ocean	
81°8′N 86°0′E	Kara Sea	
74°50′N 86°0′E	Russia	Krasnoyarsk Krai
74°17′N 86°0′E	Pyasina Bay	
73°50′N 86°0′E	Russia	Krasnoyarsk Krai; Tomsk Oblast — from 59°57′N 86°0′E; Kemerovo Oblast — from 56°28′N 86°0′E; Altai Krai — from 54°1′N 86°0′E; Altai Republic — from 52°5′N 86°0′E
49°30′N 86°0′E	Kazakhstan	
48°27′N 86°0′E	People's Republic of China	Xinjiang; Tibet — from 35°49′N 86°0′E
27°55′N 86°0′E	Nepal	
26°39′N 86°0′E	India	Bihar; Jharkhand — from 24°45′N 86°0′E; West Bengal — from 23°28′N 86°0′E; Jharkhand — from 23°8′N 86°0′E; Odisha — from 22°31′N 86°0′E; Jharkhand — from 22°26′N 86°0′E; Odisha — from 22°17′N 86°0′E; Jharkhand — from 22°13′N 86°0′E; Odisha — from 22°6′N 86°0′E
19°50′N 86°0′E	Indian Ocean	
60°0′S 86°0′E	Southern Ocean	
66°14′S 86°0′E	Antarctica	Australian Antarctic Territory, claimed by Australia

== See also ==
- 85th meridian east
- 87th meridian east
