= 88th meridian east =

Line of longitude

88th meridian east

The meridian 88° east of Greenwich is a line of longitude that extends from the North Pole across the Arctic Ocean, Asia, the Indian Ocean, the Southern Ocean, and Antarctica to the South Pole.

The 88th meridian east forms a great circle with the 92nd meridian west.

== From Pole to Pole ==
Starting at the North Pole and heading south to the South Pole, the 88th meridian east passes through:

Co-ordinates	Country, territory or sea	Notes
90°0′N 88°0′E	Arctic Ocean	
81°8′N 88°0′E	Kara Sea	
75°38′N 88°0′E	Russia	Krasnoyarsk Krai — Ringnes Island
75°37′N 88°0′E	Kara Sea	
75°7′N 88°0′E	Russia	Krasnoyarsk Krai; Tomsk Oblast — from 59°16′N 88°0′E; Kemerovo Oblast — from 56°39′N 88°0′E; Altai Republic — from 52°31′N 88°0′E; Republic of Khakassia — from 51°58′N 88°0′E; Altai Republic — from 51°45′N 88°0′E; Republic of Khakassia — from 51°35′N 88°0′E; Altai Republic — from 51°28′N 88°0′E
49°13′N 88°0′E	Mongolia	
48°46′N 88°0′E	People's Republic of China	Xinjiang - for about 15 km
48°37′N 88°0′E	Mongolia	For about 6 km
48°34′N 88°0′E	People's Republic of China	Xinjiang; Tibet — from 36°26′N 88°0′E
27°55′N 88°0′E	Nepal	
27°10′N 88°0′E	India	West Bengal - for about 6 km
27°6′N 88°0′E	Nepal	
26°22′N 88°0′E	India	Bihar; West Bengal — from 26°8′N 88°0′E; Bihar — from 25°43′N 88°0′E; West Bengal — from 25°30′N 88°0′E
21°53′N 88°0′E	Indian Ocean	
60°0′S 88°0′E	Southern Ocean	
66°0′S 88°0′E	Antarctica	Australian Antarctic Territory, claimed by Australia

Next westward: 87th meridian east	88th meridian east forms a great circle with 92nd meridian west	Next eastward: 89th meridian east
