= William Hovgaard =

American educator (1857–1950)

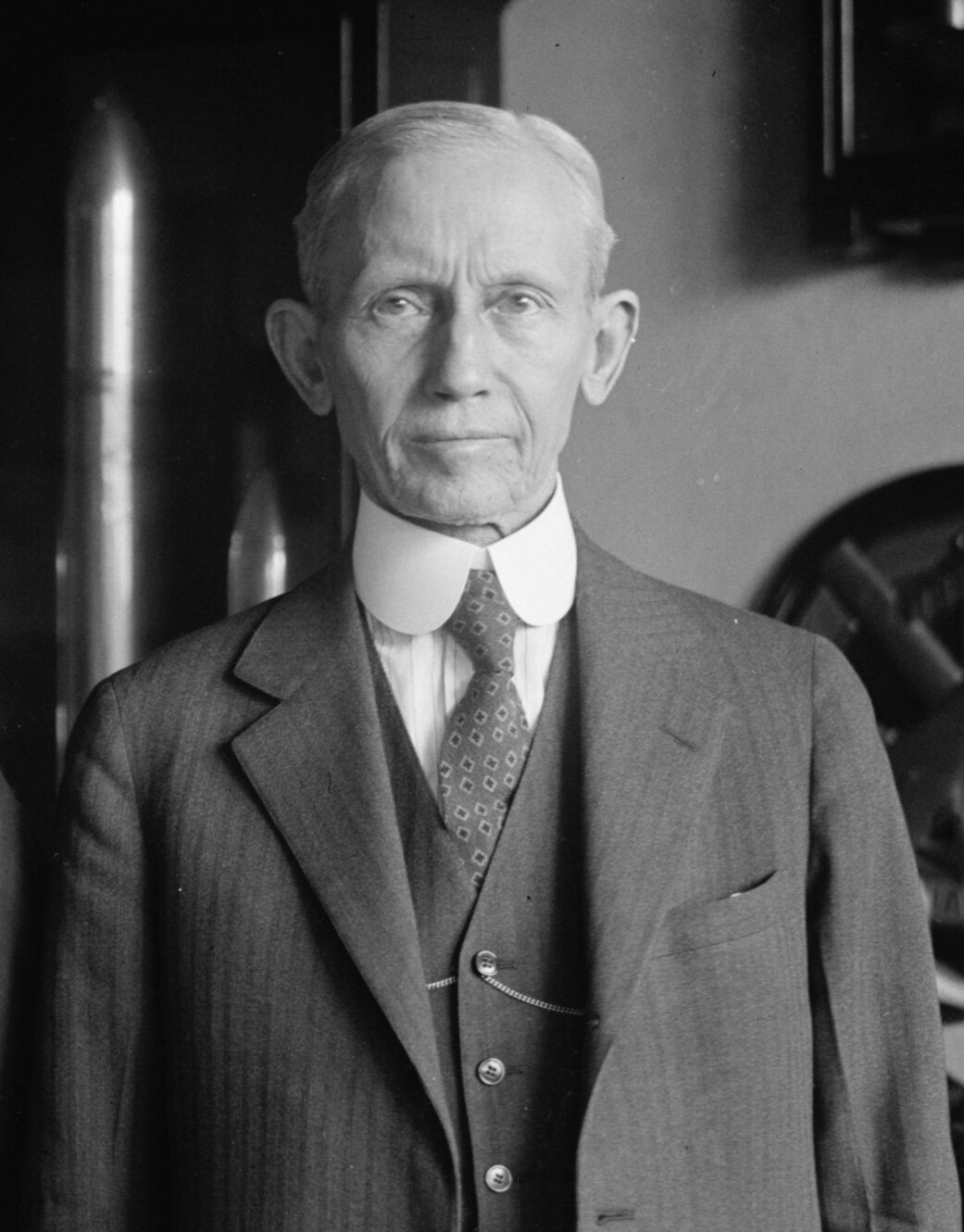
- Photo of Hovgaard in 1925
- Born: 1857; Aarhus, Denmark
- Died: 1950 (aged 92–93); Summit, New Jersey, U.S.
- Occupations: Educator; writer
- Relatives: Andreas Peter Hovgaard (brother)

William Hovgaard (1857 – 1950) was a Danish-born American academic who specialized in studying naval architecture and shipbuilding at the Massachusetts Institute of Technology until his retirement in 1933.

Hovgaard was one of the foremost authorities on ship design in his generation, especially on the general and structural design of warships. He wrote several books on naval design and construction and the history thereof, but also on a diversity of other subjects, and he received a significant number of orders, awards and merits during his life.

His brother was Royal Danish Navy officer Andreas Peter Hovgaard, who led an Arctic survey expedition to the Kara Sea on the steamship Dijmphna from 1882 to 1883.

== Life ==
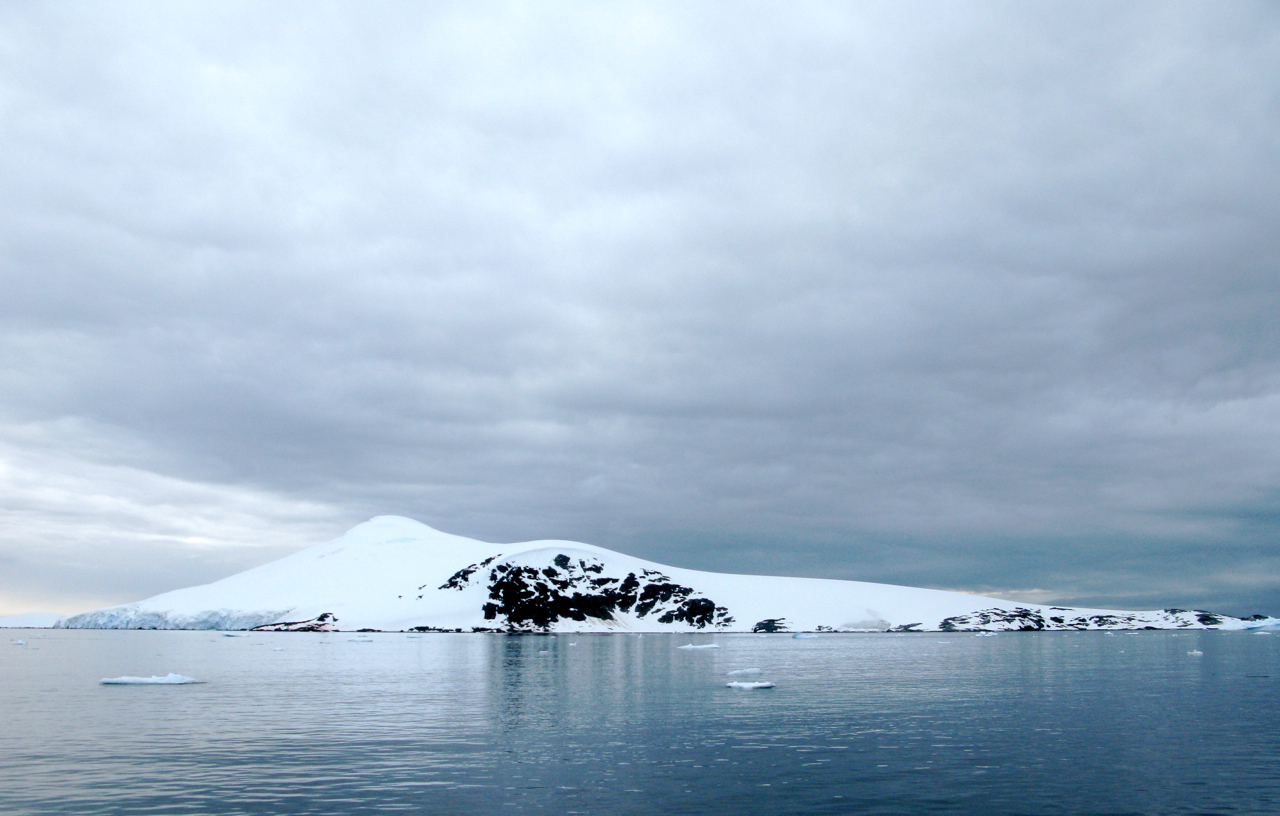
Hovgaard Island, named after Hovgaard's brother

According to Hovgaard's National Academy of Sciences biographical memoir,

His contribution to the shipbuilding art in this country, and particularly to the education of the officers of the Corps of Naval Constructors of the United States Navy, is incalculable.

In 1912 he helped organize the American-Scandinavian Foundation, New York City, and was a Trustee and Vice-President until his death. He was a member of the American Academy of Arts and Sciences, American Geographical Society, Institute of the Aeronautical Sciences, National Academy of Sciences (elected in 1929), Institution of Naval Architects (London), American Society of Naval Architects and Marine Engineers, United States Naval Institute, American Mathematical Society, American Association of University Professors, Society for the Advancement of Scandinavian Study, American Society of Danish Engineers, and the Massachusetts Historical Society. In 1928 he was an Invited Speaker of the ICM in Bologna.

Hovgaard wrote a number of books and scientific articles on a number of subjects. Pertaining to his warship expertise, he wrote Structural Design of Warships (1915) and General Design of Warships and Modern History of Warships (1920).

Books by Hovgaard on other subjects include The Voyages of the Norsemen to America (1914) where he comments on this subject-matter based on his knowledge of ships and navigation. He comes to the conclusion that Leif Ericsson reached the south coast of Cape Cod. Hovgaard wrote,

"He landed on the shores of the cape at some point where there was a long, narrow beach outside a large expanse of water, a pond or a lagoon, into which he entered. A river or brook flowed into the pond. This pond may have been on the east coast of the Cape Cod peninsula, but more probably it was on the south shore, in Nantucket Sound."

In 1962 William Francis Gibbs commented on Hovgaard's 1944 book The United World.

This is a splendid example of his clear understanding of world politics and the problems that existed or that would arise during the process of making effective peace. His ideas concerning peace and how to secure it read like a prophecy of events that are now taking place. While his professional abilities had been utilized to create instruments of warfare, he sought to prevent war, knowing well its horrors, by creating a better intellectual understanding among nations.

At his death he had for some years been working on a new theory of cosmology, but it remained unfinished.

== Career ==
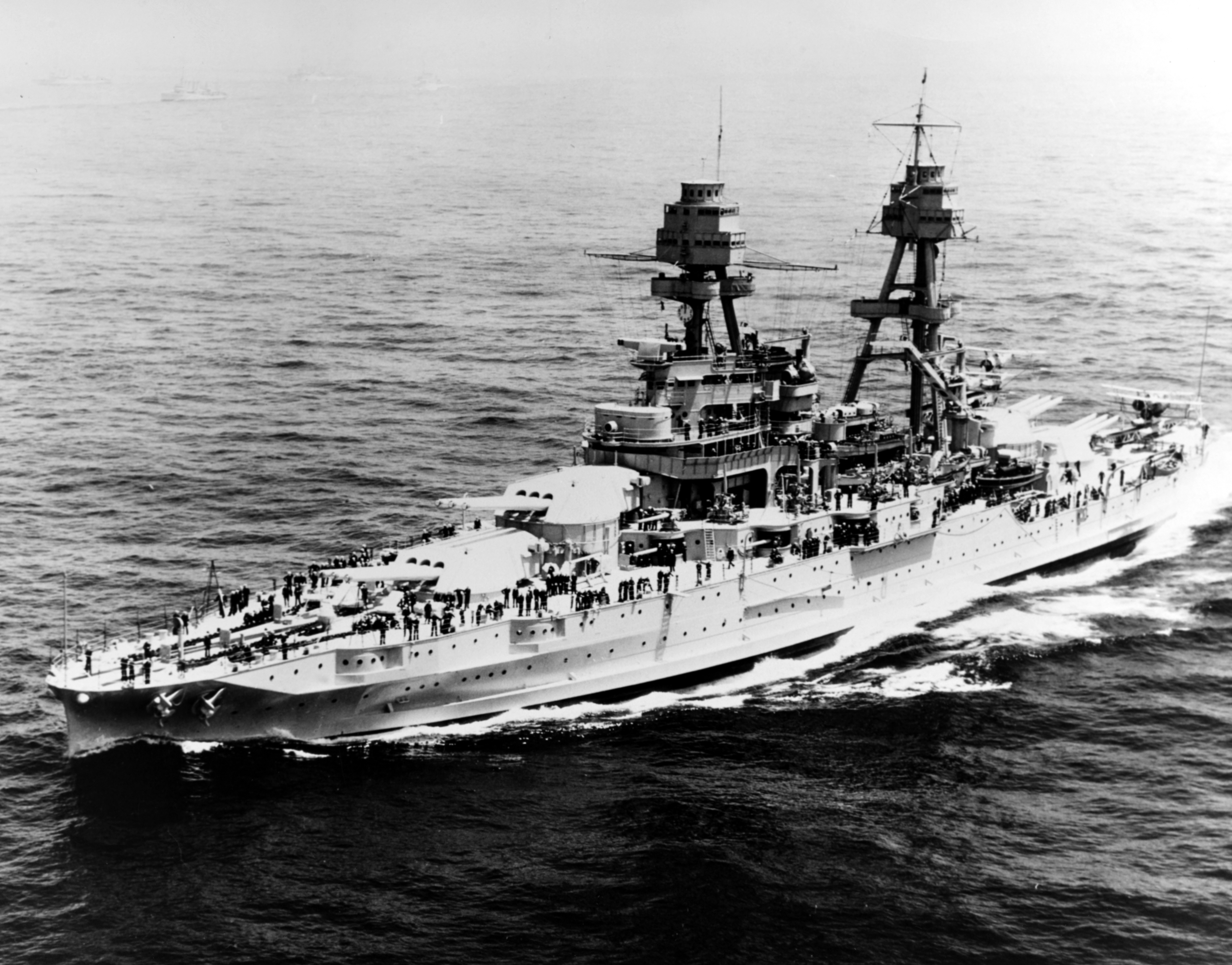
USS Pennsylvania, an example of a US warship built in the 1910s

Hovgaard graduated from the Royal Danish Naval Academy at age 21, and next served as a sub-lieutenant and later as a lieutenant in the Royal Danish Navy. He later attended the Royal Naval College, Greenwich to study naval architecture and construction on the Royal Corps of Naval Constructors course, from which he graduated in 1887. He worked for some years for Burmeister & Wain, before attaining the rank of commander in the Royal Danish Navy. He next transferred to the Massachusetts Institute of Technology, working as a professor, teaching courses such as Warship Design, Theory of Warship Design, and History of Modern Warship Construction.

In 1915, Hovgaard served as an expert witness after the sinking of RMS Titanic (later he would also give testimony on the RMS Lusitania). Later he served as vice-president in The American-Scandinavian Foundation. In 1925, he was technical advisor to the U.S. Navy board which investigated the crash of the airship Shenandoah. In 1929, Hovgaard was appointed to the Department of Commerce's Committee on Ship Construction, and later the same year he became a full member of the National Academy of Sciences.

Hovgaard retired in 1933, but continued to be active as a scientist and naval authority for many years. In 1934 he addressed the American Academy of Arts and Sciences in Boston regarding "Fundamentals of the Theory of Relativity".

In 1937 Hovgaard was honored at a luncheon at the Astor Hotel, under sponsorship of the American Society of Danish Engineers, the Danish Officers' Club, and the Danish Luncheon Club. A letter read at the luncheon from a US naval official noted that 85 percent of the officers in the Navy's construction corps were Hovgaard's former students, and that every one of the Navy's ships currently docked at New York Harbor was constructed under the supervision of his former pupils.

== Selected bibliography ==
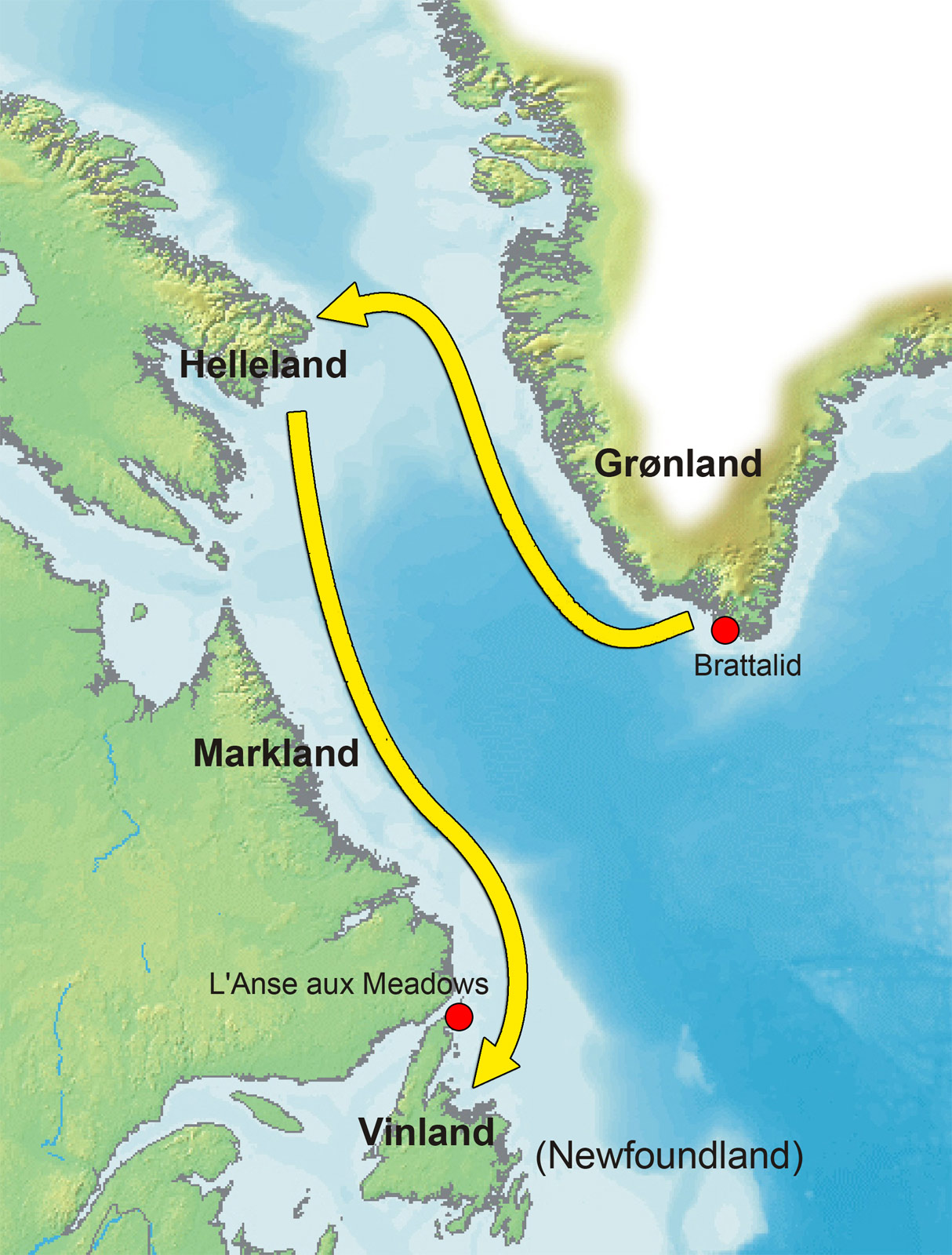
Hovgaard also wrote extensively on Norse pre-Columbian travels to Vinland

=== Books on Naval Architecture ===
- 1887 Submarine Boats. E.&F. Spon, Ltd. London. 98pp.
- 1891 Lectures on Technology. Royal Dockyard. Copenhagen. 195pp.
- 1915 Structural Design of Warships. E.&F. Spon, Ltd. London. 384pp.
- 1920 Modern History of Warships. E.&F. Spon, Ltd. London. 514pp.
- 1920 General Design of Warships. E.&F. Spon, Ltd. London. 307pp.

=== Books on Non-Naval Architecture Subjects ===
- 1887 Sundhed eller Kundskaber. Emil Bergman. Copenhagen. 80pp.
- 1888 Sport. Emil Bergman. Copenhagen. 174pp.
- 1914 The Voyages of the Norsemen in America. American Scandinavian Foundation. New York. 304pp.

=== Articles ===
- 1925 The Norsemen in Greenland: Recent Discoveries at Herjolfsnes, Geographical Review
- 1926 The Arsenal in Piraeus and the Ancient Building Rules, Isis

=== Other ===
- Papers stored at the MIT

== Honours and awards ==
- Order of the Redeemer, Greece (1889)
- Order of Franz Joseph (Austrian Empire) (1890)
- Order of St. Anna (Russia) (1901)
- Order of St. Stanislaus (Russia) (1901)
- Honorary Member, Royal Institution of Naval Architects, awarded for his work on buoyancy and stability of submarines.
- Commander of the Order of the Dannebrog (1927)
- Honorary Doctorate, Doctor of Engineering, Polyteknisk Læreanstalt (1929)
- Member, National Academy of Sciences (elected in 1929)
- Lifetime member, Society of Naval Architects and Marine Engineers (1932)
- Honorary Doctorate, Doctor of Engineering, Stevens Institute (1934)
- Naval Order of Spain (1936)
- David W. Taylor Medal (1943)
- Gold medal for distinguished service to America and Scandinavia, American-Scandinavian Foundation (1948)

== See also ==
- Contents of 10 manuscript boxes, 1 legal-size manuscript box and 1 cassette box on, and donated by, Hovgaard at MIT
