= 92nd meridian west =

Line of longitude

92nd meridian west (interactive map)

The meridian 92° west of Greenwich is a line of longitude that extends from the North Pole across the Arctic Ocean, North America, the Gulf of Mexico, Central America, the Pacific Ocean, the Southern Ocean, and Antarctica to the South Pole.

The 92nd meridian west forms a great circle with the 88th meridian east.

== From Pole to Pole ==
Starting at the North Pole and heading south to the South Pole, the 92nd meridian west passes through:

| Co-ordinates | Country, territory or sea | Notes |
|---|---|---|
| 90°0′N 92°0′W | Arctic Ocean | Passing just west of Ellesmere Island, Nunavut, Canada (at 81°38′N 91°56′W); Passing just west of Krueger Island, Nunavut, Canada (at 81°35′N 91°57′W) |
| 81°31′N 92°0′W | Canada | Nunavut — Fjeldholmen Island |
| 81°30′N 92°0′W | Nansen Sound | |
| 81°11′N 92°0′W | Canada | Nunavut — Axel Heiberg Island |
| 78°12′N 92°0′W | Norwegian Bay | |
| 76°39′N 92°0′W | Canada | Nunavut — Devon Island |
| 74°46′N 92°0′W | Parry Channel | Barrow Strait |
| 74°0′N 92°0′W | Canada | Nunavut — Somerset Island |
| 72°47′N 92°0′W | Prince Regent Inlet | |
| 71°30′N 92°0′W | Gulf of Boothia | |
| 70°25′N 92°0′W | Canada | Nunavut — Boothia Peninsula (mainland) |
| 70°0′N 92°0′W | Gulf of Boothia | Lord Mayor Bay |
| 69°33′N 92°0′W | Canada | Nunavut — mainland |
| 62°49′N 92°0′W | Hudson Bay | Rankin Inlet |
| 62°39′N 92°0′W | Canada | Nunavut — mainland |
| 62°32′N 92°0′W | Hudson Bay | |
| 57°3′N 92°0′W | Canada | Manitoba; Ontario — from 54°55′N 92°0′W |
| 48°14′N 92°0′W | United States | Minnesota |
| 46°50′N 92°0′W | Lake Superior | |
| 46°42′N 92°0′W | United States | Wisconsin; Minnesota — from 44°22′N 92°0′W; Iowa — from 43°30′N 92°0′W; Missouri — from 40°36′N 92°0′W; Arkansas — from 36°30′N 92°0′W; Louisiana — from 33°1′N 92°0′W, the mainland and Marsh Island |
| 29°33′N 92°0′W | Gulf of Mexico | |
| 18°43′N 92°0′W | Mexico | Campeche; Tabasco — from 18°3′N 92°0′W; Chiapas — from 17°53′N 92°0′W |
| 15°37′N 92°0′W | Guatemala | |
| 14°21′N 92°0′W | Pacific Ocean | |
| 60°0′S 92°0′W | Southern Ocean | |
| 72°35′S 92°0′W | Antarctica | Unclaimed territory |

== See also ==
- 91st meridian west
- 93rd meridian west
