= Simpson Strait =

Shallow strait in Nunavut, Canada

Simpson Strait

The Simpson Strait (68°32′N 097°30′W) is a natural, shallow waterway separating King William Island to the north from Adelaide Peninsula on Nunavut's mainland to the south. The strait, an arm of the Arctic Ocean, connects the Queen Maud Gulf with Rasmussen Basin's Rae Strait.

Simpson Strait measures 40 mi (64 km) long and 2–10 mi (3.2–16.1 km) wide, and there are several small islands within it: Albert, Beaver, Boulder, Castor, Chens, Club, Comb, Denille, Dolphin, Eta, Hook, Kilwinning, Pollux, Ristvedt, Saatuq, Sarvaq and Taupe.

== History ==
The English naval officer George Back reached Simpson Strait in 1834, but did not name it.

In 1836, the Hudson's Bay Company wanted to "endeavour to complete the discovery and survey of the northern shores of the American continent" and so it sent the Scottish explorer Thomas Simpson and the Canadian explorer Peter Warren Dease on an expedition. Simpson and Dease reached the Simpson Strait in 1839, and named it in honor of Simpson.

Roald Amundsen traversed it in 1903 during his first successful Northwest Passage voyage.
