= Bjarnason Island =

Island in Nunavut, Canada

- Location within Nunavut Location within Canada

Geography
- Location: Northern Canada
- Coordinates: 80°40′N 95°30′W
- Archipelago: Arctic Archipelago

Administration
- Canada
- Territory: Nunavut

Demographics
- Population: Uninhabited

Bjarnason Island is an island of the Arctic Archipelago in the territory of Nunavut. It lies in the Arctic Ocean, north-west of Axel Heiberg Island, separated from it by Bukken Fiord to its north and Bunde Fiord to its south.

Another, smaller Bjarnason Island is found in Lake Manitoba.

The Nunavut island was named after Matt Bjarnason by Dr. Raymond Thorsteinsson of the Geological Survey of Canada in the early 1970s. Matt had just graduated from the University of Calgary and was one month into his new job working for Texaco when he was killed in a helicopter crash. Contained on this webpage, ASN Wikibase Occurrence # 166887 , are the tragic details of the crash.
