= Clarence Islands =

Island group in Nunavut, Canada

- Location within Nunavut Location within Canada

Geography
- Location: Northern Canada
- Coordinates: 69°55′00″N 097°19′59″W
- Archipelago: Canadian Arctic Archipelago
- Area: 55 km^{2} (21 sq mi)

Administration
- Canada
- Territory: Nunavut
- Region: Kitikmeot

The Clarence Islands are a Canadian Arctic island group in the Nunavut Territory. The islands lie in the James Ross Strait, 16 kilometres (10 miles) east of Cape Felix, off the northeast coast of King William Island. They are about 40 km (25 mi) west of Kent Bay on the Boothia Peninsula, and about 40 km (25 mi) northwest of the Tennent Islands.

== History ==
Captain (Sir) John Ross commanded the Victory during his second Arctic exploration (1829—1833), partly in order to regain credibility after charting a fictional landform, Croker Mountains, during his first Arctic expedition. He chose his nephew, Commander James Clark Ross, to be second in command.

In 1830, while exploring within the Ross Strait, James Ross charted three islands. He named the group "Beaufort Islands" after Capt. Francis Beaufort, hydrographer of the Admiralty, and named the individual islands Adolphus Island, Frederick Island, and Augustus Island. John Ross did not see the "Beaufort Islands".

Upon returning to England in 1833, the expedition's members learned that the Duke of Clarence had ascended to the throne in 1830, becoming King William IV. John Ross reviewed his expedition's chart book with Capt. Beaufort and with the new king. With the notation "changed by His Majesty's command" included, John Ross made changes to the chart: he added six islands and three capes, all with royal Clarence and Fitz-Clarence family names (including Munster Island, Falkland Island, Erskine Island, Fox Island, Errol Island, Cape Sophia, Cape Sidney, and Cape Mary), and renamed the island group "Clarence Islands". While as leader of the expedition, John Ross had authority to name newly charted landforms as he wished, he did not receive authority to add fictional landforms to navigation chart books.

Lady Jane Franklin documented in her diary a meeting she had with Capt. Beaufort regarding the controversial chart book changes:

Captain B. asked me if Sir John's ire had abated against (James) Ross, and he (Captain B.) seemed much tickled at this subject - he was not one he said to take away a man's fair character, but there were some things that ought to be held up to reprobation, and he was now going to tell me a good story. He had the book brought him and he asked me how many islands I counted in the Clarence group. I counted 9 - 3 I said were lilac, and the others white. "Well", says he, "there are but 3, and when the chart was first shown to me, there were only 3 marked down, but Ross having proposed to the King to call them the Clarence Islands, 'Yes, yes,' said the King, 'call them the Clarence islands', and then Ross thought it would be as well to make a few more, so that the Clarences and Fitzclarences might have one apiece." The story was afterwards confirmed to Sir John by Capt. James Ross, who said that his uncle had never seen the islands, had never been there and that it was he, Capt. James, who laid down in the map the true original number.

== Sources ==
- Maurizio Bossi; Gabinetto scientifico letterario; G.P. Vieusseux (1984). Notizie di viaggi lontani : l'esplorazione extraeuropea nei periodici del primo Ottocento, 1815-1845. Naples: Guida. ISBN 88-7042-399-9.
- Ross, M.J. (1994). Polar pioneers : John Ross and James Clark Ross. Montreal: McGill-Queen's University Press. ISBN 0-7735-1234-9.
- Woodman, David C. (1991). Unravelling the Franklin disaster : Inuit testimony. Montreal: McGill-Queen's University Press. ISBN 0-7735-0833-3.
- Clarence Islands at Atlas of Canada
