= Hovgaard Island (Antarctica) =

Island in Wilhelm Archipelago, Antarctica

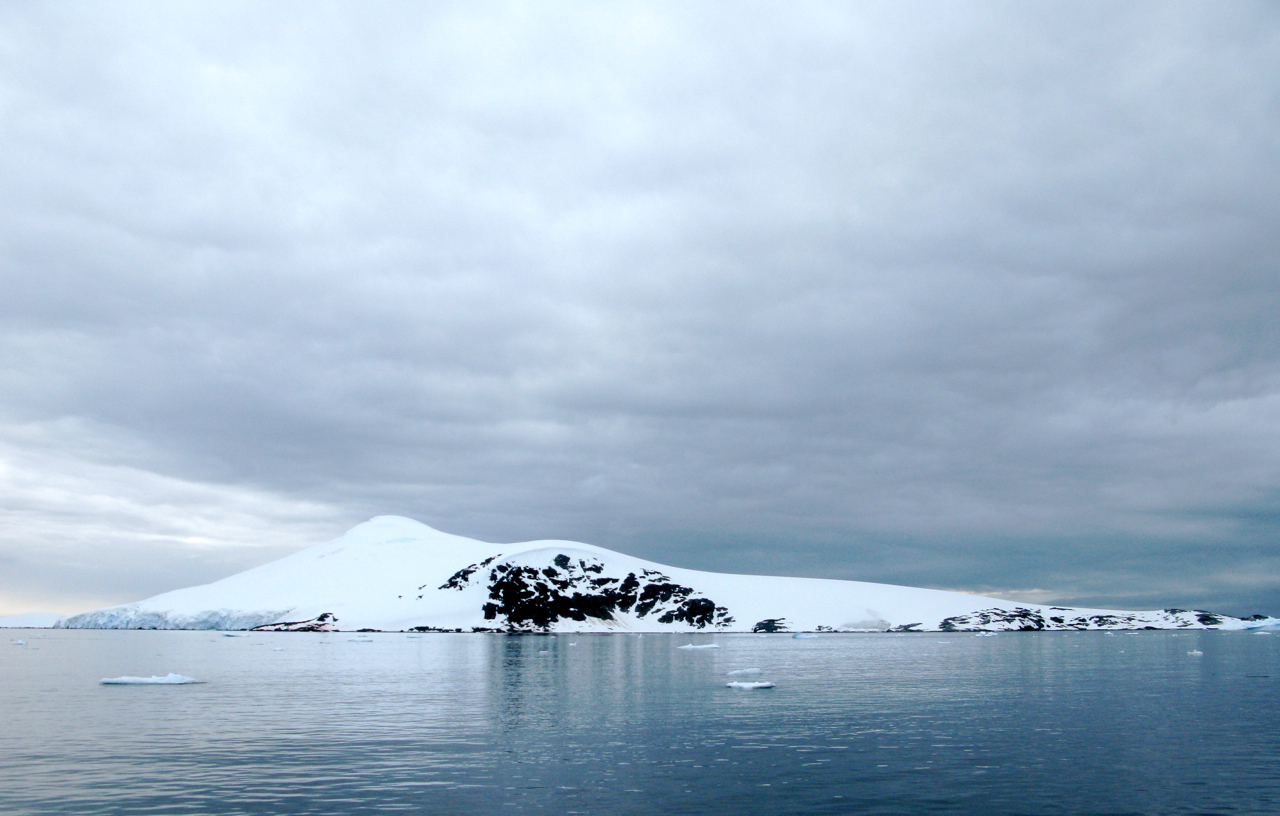
- Hovgaard Island

- Location within Antarctica

Geography
- Location: Antarctica
- Coordinates: 65°8′S 64°8′W
- Archipelago: Wilhelm Archipelago

Administration
- Administered under the Antarctic Treaty System

Demographics
- Population: Uninhabited

Hovgaard Island (65°8′S 64°8′W) is an island 3 nautical miles (5.6 km; 3.5 mi) long, lying 1.5 nautical miles (2.8 km; 1.7 mi) southwest of Booth Island in the Wilhelm Archipelago, Antarctica.

== Location ==
Graham Coast, Antarctic Peninsula. Hovgaar Island south of Booth Island, off the east end

Hovgaard Island is off the Graham Coast of the northwest side of the Antarctic Peninsula. It is in the Wilhelm Archipelago. It is southwest of Booth Island, northwest of Mount Shackleton on the mainland, northeast of the French Passage and east of the Vedel Islands. It is off the northwest coast of the Kyiv Peninsula.

Hovgaard Island is a popular location for camping in Antarctica among expedition groups due to the presence of a relatively flat campsite along Penola Strait. Campers dig "snow graves" to sleep in. The holes offer protection from the wind.

== Discovery and name ==
Hovgaard Island was discovered and named Krogmann Island by the German 1873–74 expedition under Eduard Dallmann, but the name Hovgaard applied by the Belgian Antarctic Expedition (BelgAE), 1897–99, under Adrien de Gerlache, has overtaken the original name in usage. Andreas Peter Hovgaard was a polar explorer and officer of the Danish Navy. The name Krogmann Point has been given to the western extremity of Hovgaard Island.

== Sailing directions ==
The US Defense Mapping Agency's Sailing Directions for Antarctica (1976) describes Hovgaard Island as follows:

HOVGAARD ISLAND (Krogmann Island) lies close southwestward of Booth Island and is about 3 miles long northeast-southwest with an average breadth of about 1 mile. The highest elevation is a well-rounded summit, about 1,200 feet high near the central part of the Island, the ice-covered slopes of which descend gradually to the north where a small peninsula, covered with penguin rookeries, extends toward Booth Island. The shores are steep vertical cliffs, and the points are foul, making landings difficult. No anchorages have been reported on this island. Another small peninsula forms the southern extremity of Hovgaard Island, off which are several rocks. A rock, which breaks, has been charted mid-way between Hovgaard and Petermann Islands. Sampaio Ferraz Islands consisting of about 10 rocky islets lie close northwestward of the Hovgaard Island northern peninsula. These islets stretch northwestward for a distance of 2 miles.

PLENEAU ISLAND, 177 feet high, lies close off the northeastern extremity of Hovgaard Island. A shoal area, with rocks that break, is charted within 400 yards eastward of the eastern end of Pleneau Island. There Is a penguin rookery on the northeastern end of the island.

== Features ==
Features and nearby features include:

=== Guéguen Point ===
65°09′S 64°07′W. Point forming the south end of Hovgaard Island, in the Wilhelm Archipelago. Charted and named by the French Antarctic Expedition (FrAE) under Jean-Baptiste Charcot , 1903–05, after J. Guéguen Point, one of the crew the ship Francais and later, of the Pourquoi-Pas?, 1908-10.

=== Krogmann Point ===
65°08′S 64°08′W. Point forming the west extremity of Hovgaard Island. Hovgaard Island was first seen by a German expedition under Dallmann in January 1874 and named "Krogmann Insel." However, the name Hovgaard, applied by the BelgAE under Gerlache in February 1898, has overtaken the original in usage. To preserve Dallmann's earlier name in this vicinity, Krogmann Point has been approved for the feature here described.

=== Pléneau Island ===
65°06′S 64°04′W. An island, 0.8 nautical miles (1.5 km; 0.92 mi) long, lying just northeast of Hovgaard Island. Charted as a peninsula of Hovgaard Island by the FrAE, 1903–05, under Charcot, who named its northeast point for Paul Pléneau, photographer of the expedition. The feature was first shown to be an island on an Argentine government chart of 1957.

=== Penola Strait ===
65°10′S 64°07′W. A strait 11 nautical miles (20 km; 13 mi) long and averaging 2 nautical miles (3.7 km; 2.3 mi) wide, separating the Argentine Islands, Petermann Island and Hovgaard Island from the west coast of Graham Land. Traversed by the BelgAE under Gerlache on February 12, 1898. Named by the British Graham Land expedition (BGLE) 1934-37, under John Rymill, for the expedition ship Penola.

== Gallery ==
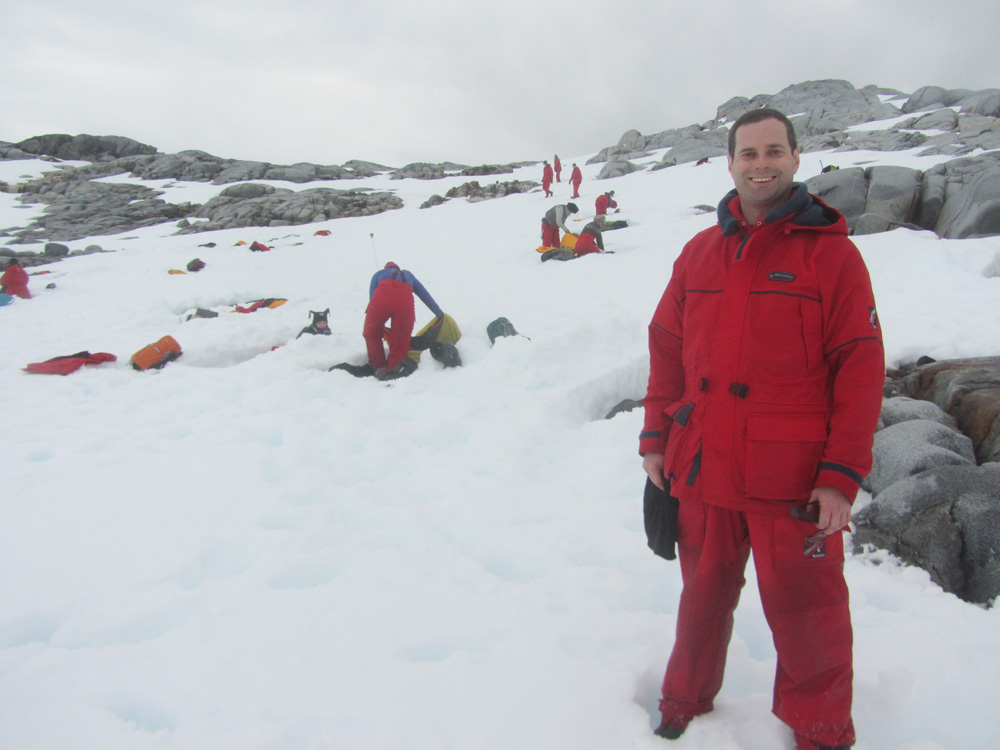
Campers on Hovgaard Island

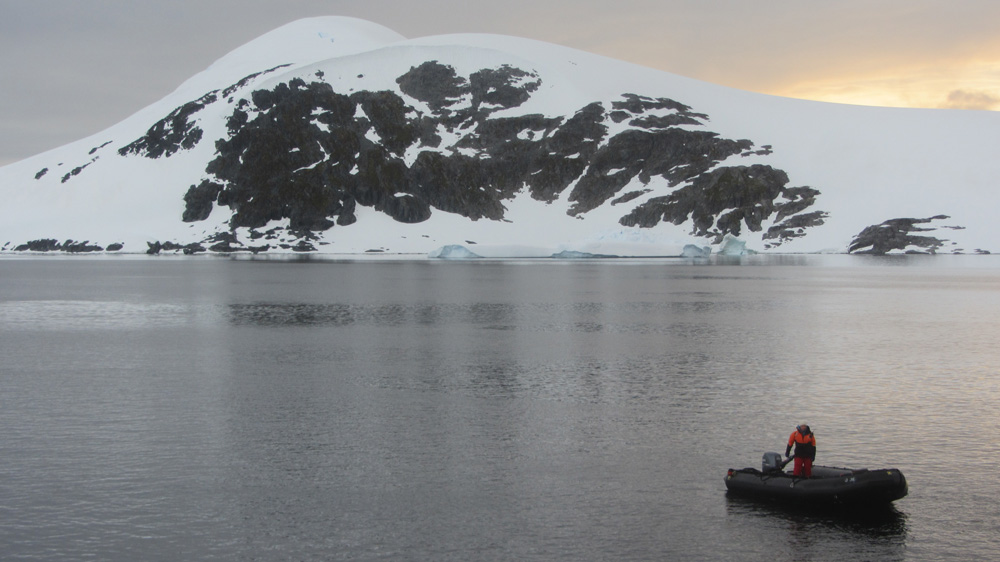
Hovgaard Island, Antarctica

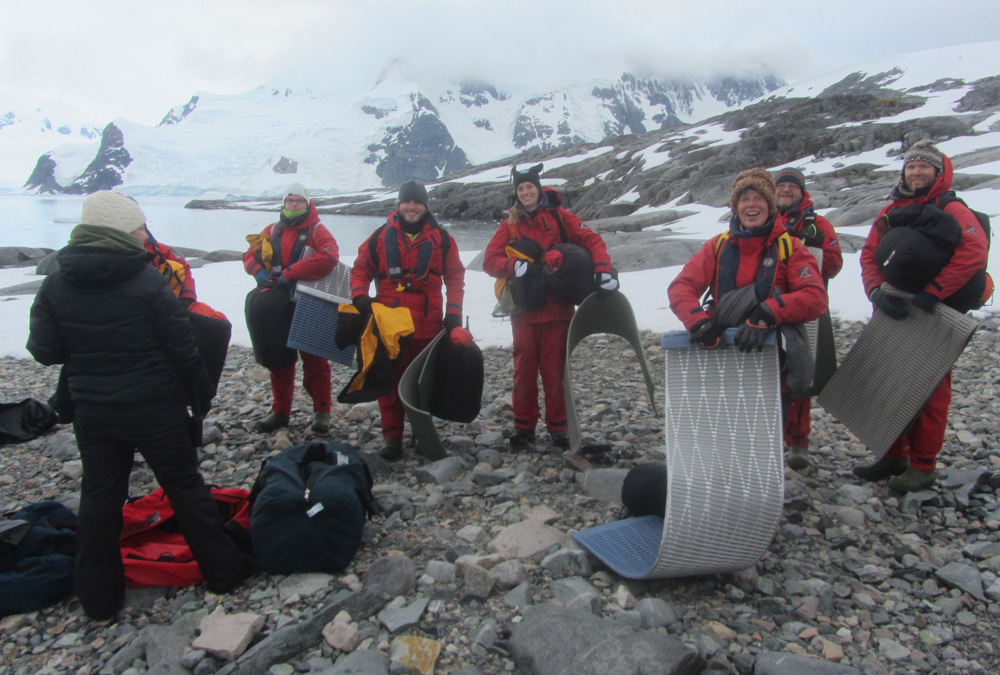
Campers on Hovgaard Island

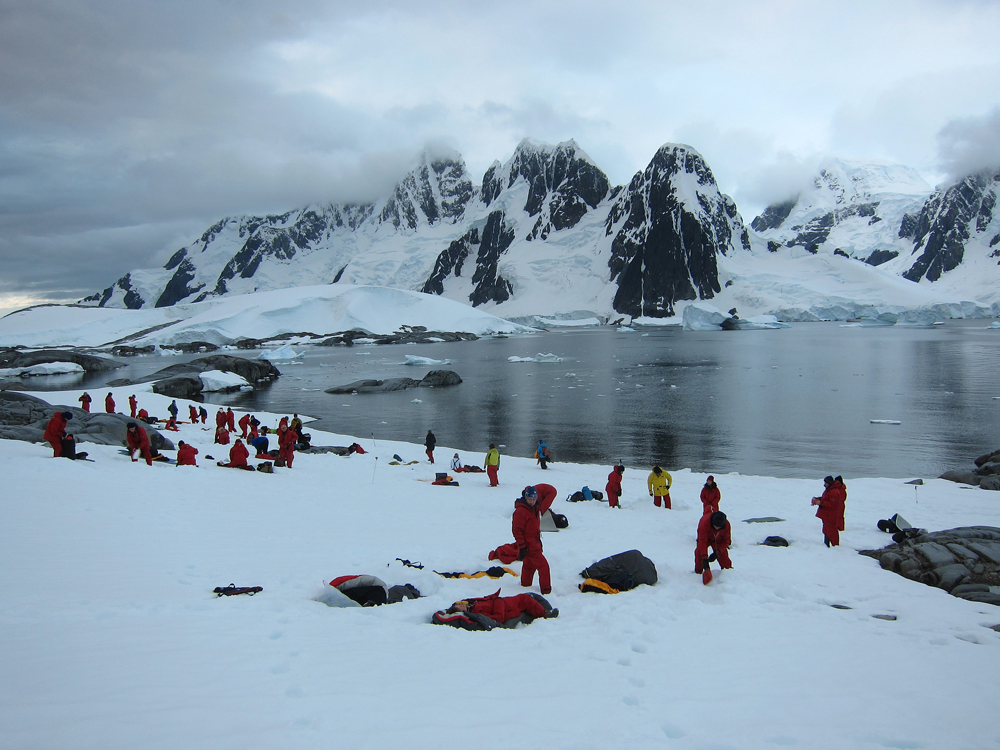
Campers on Hovgaard Island

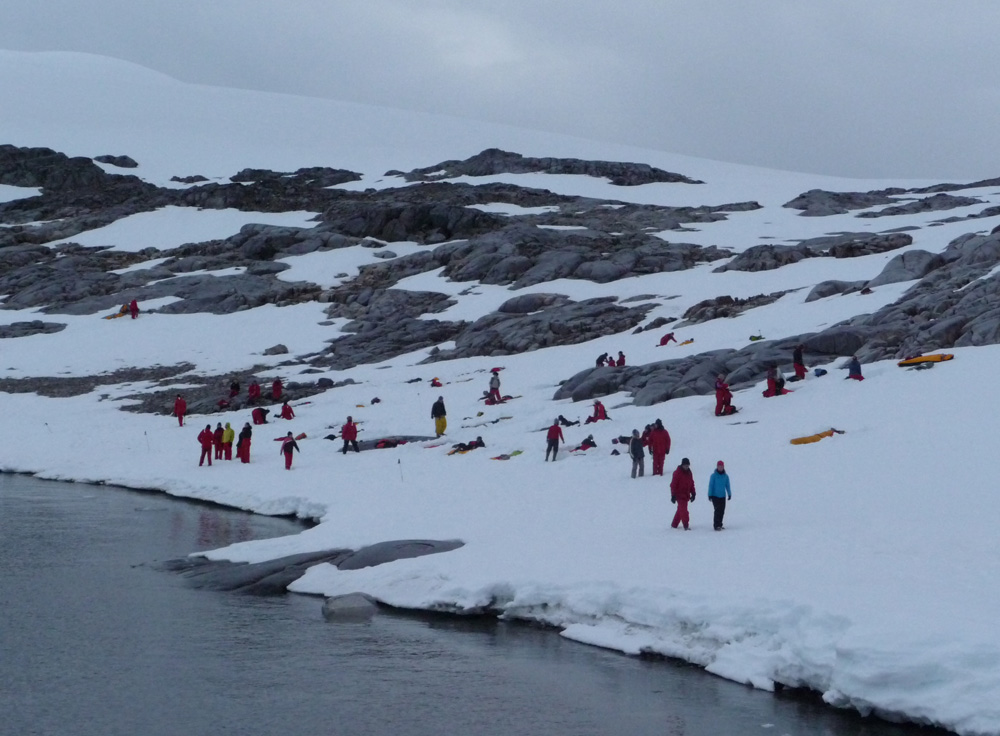
Campers on Hovgaard Island

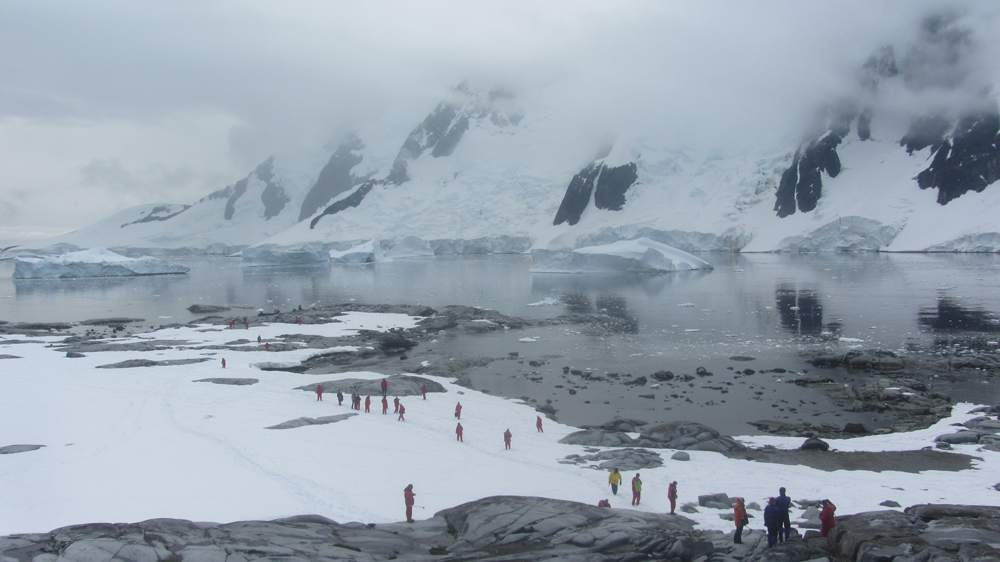
Tourists visit Pléneau Island

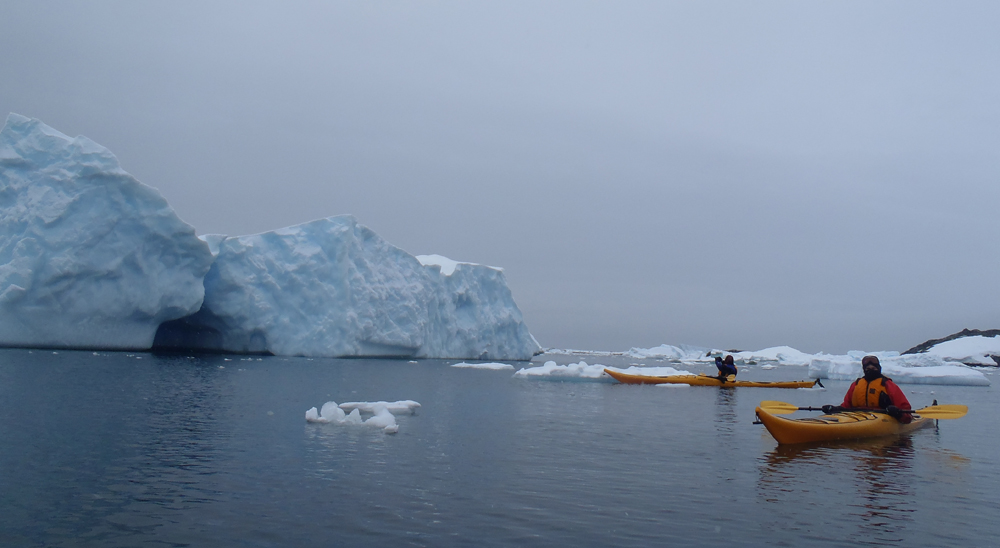
Kayakers around Pléneau Island

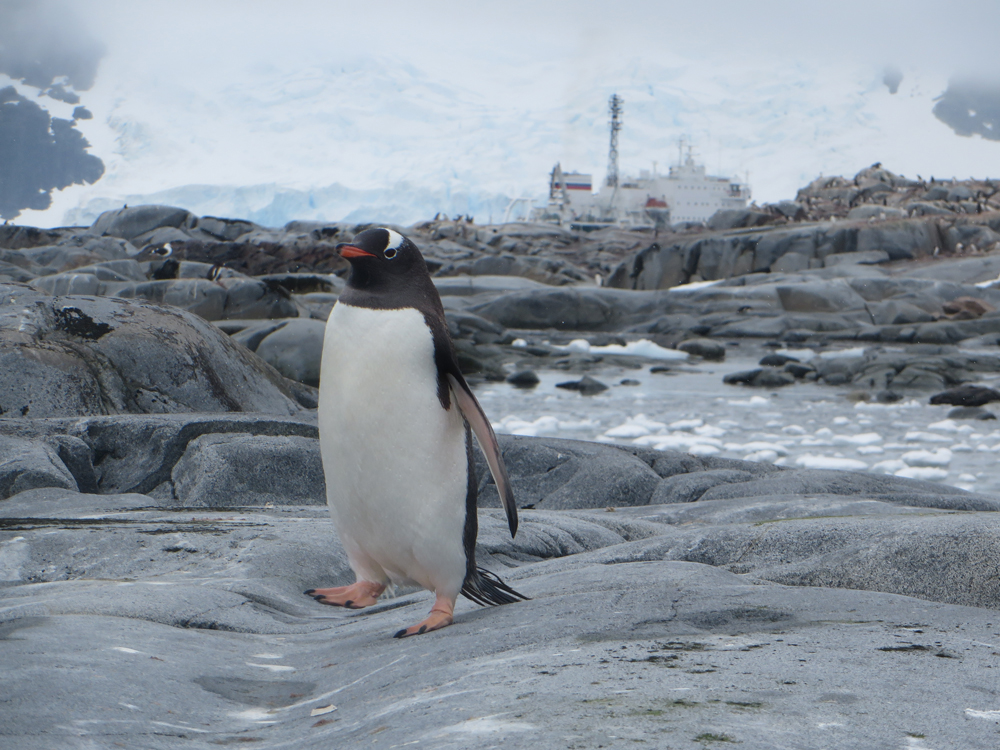
Gentoo penguin on Pléneau Island

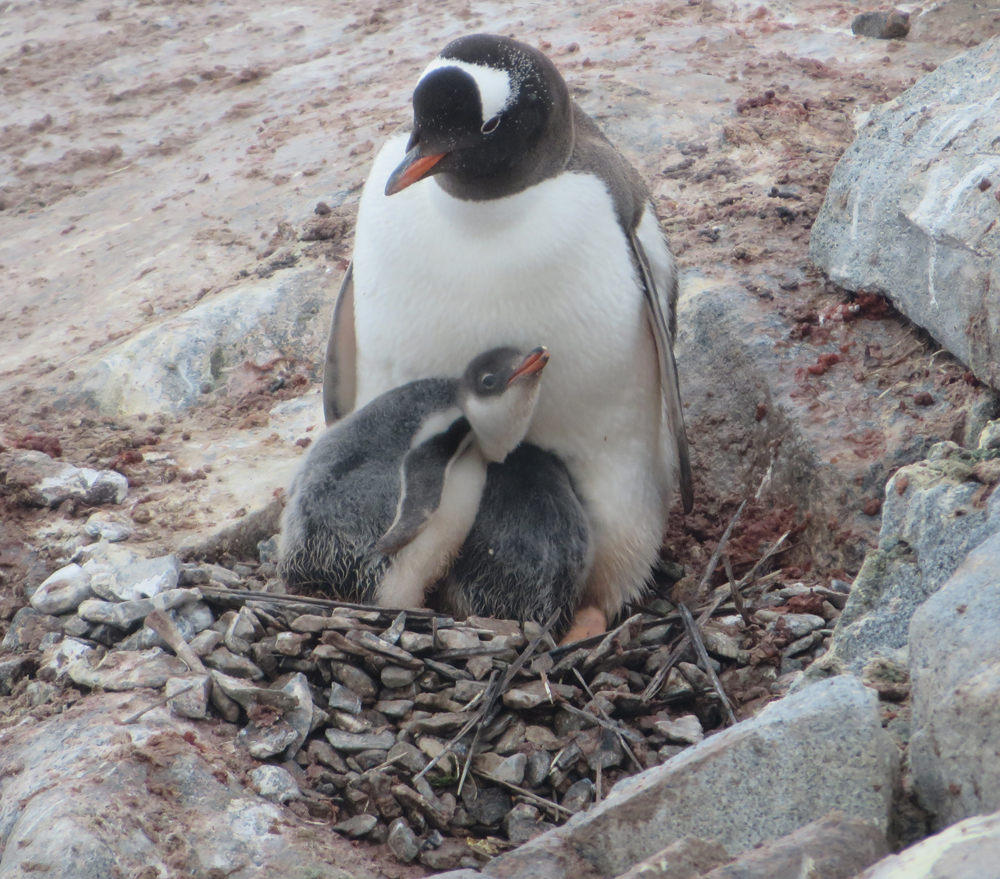
Gentoo penguin and chicks on Pléneau Island

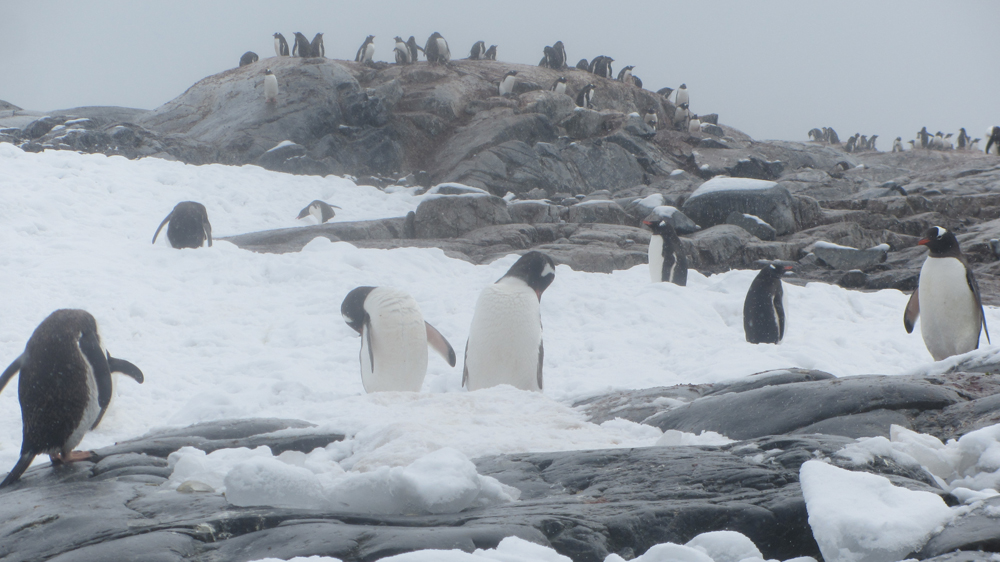
Gentoo penguin colony on Pléneau Island

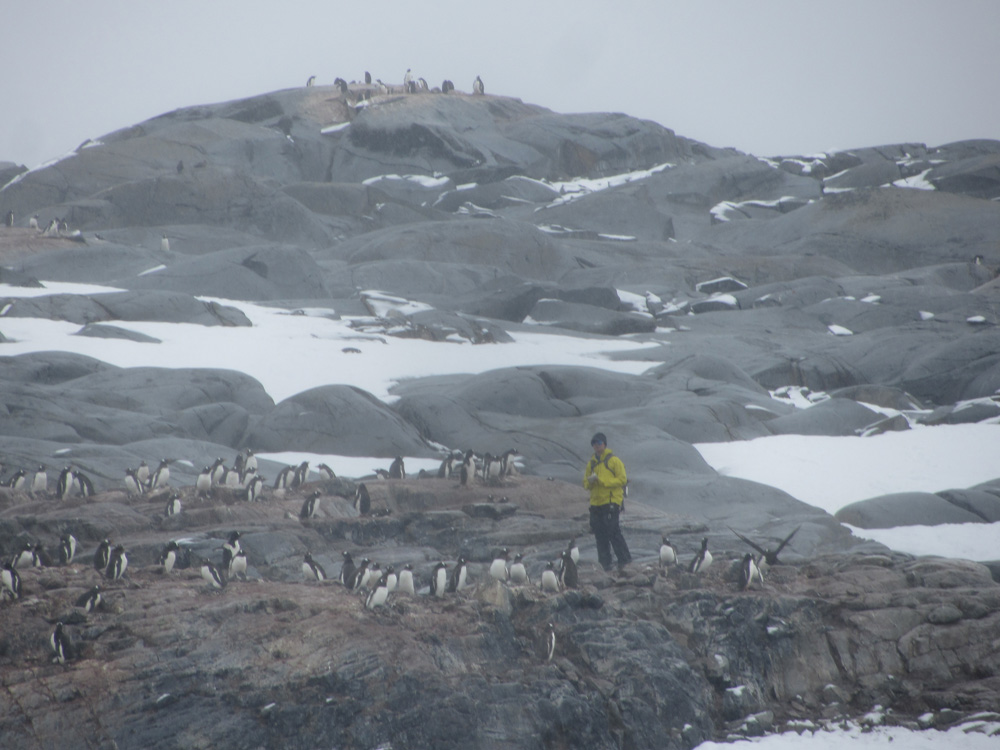
Scientist counts Gentoo penguins on Pléneau Island

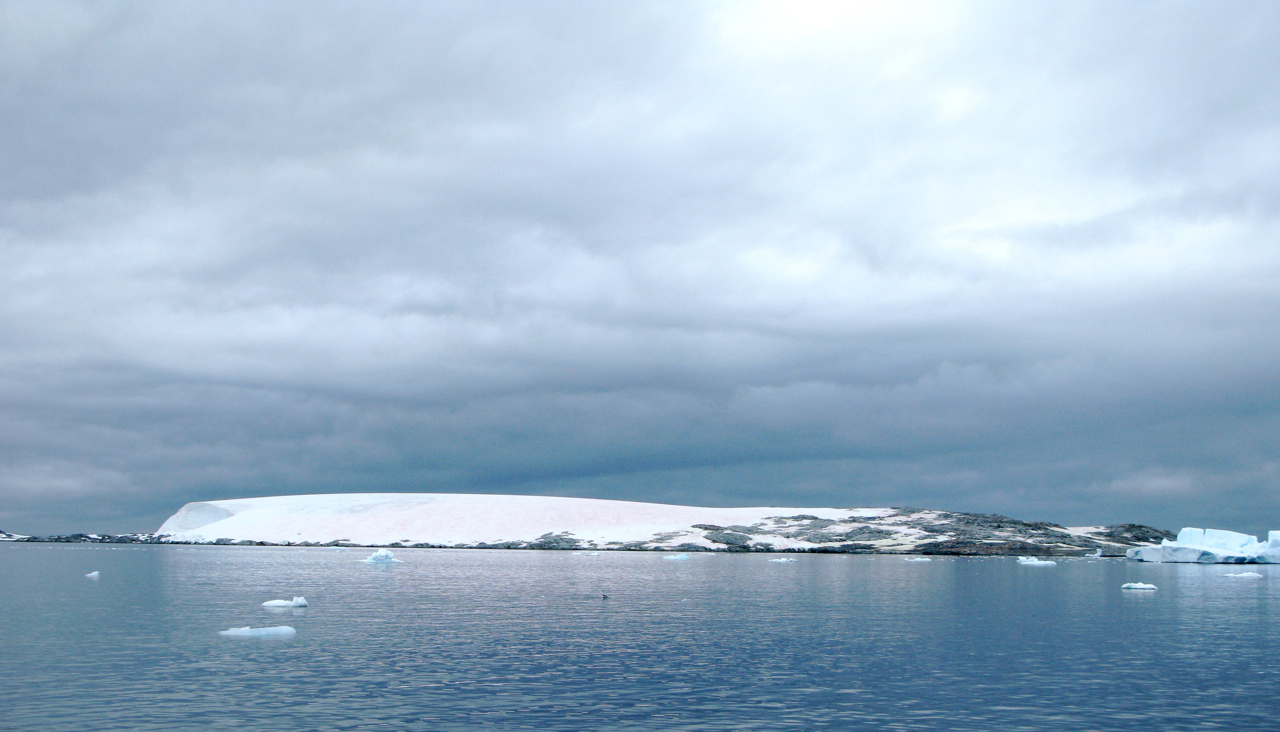
Pléneau Island

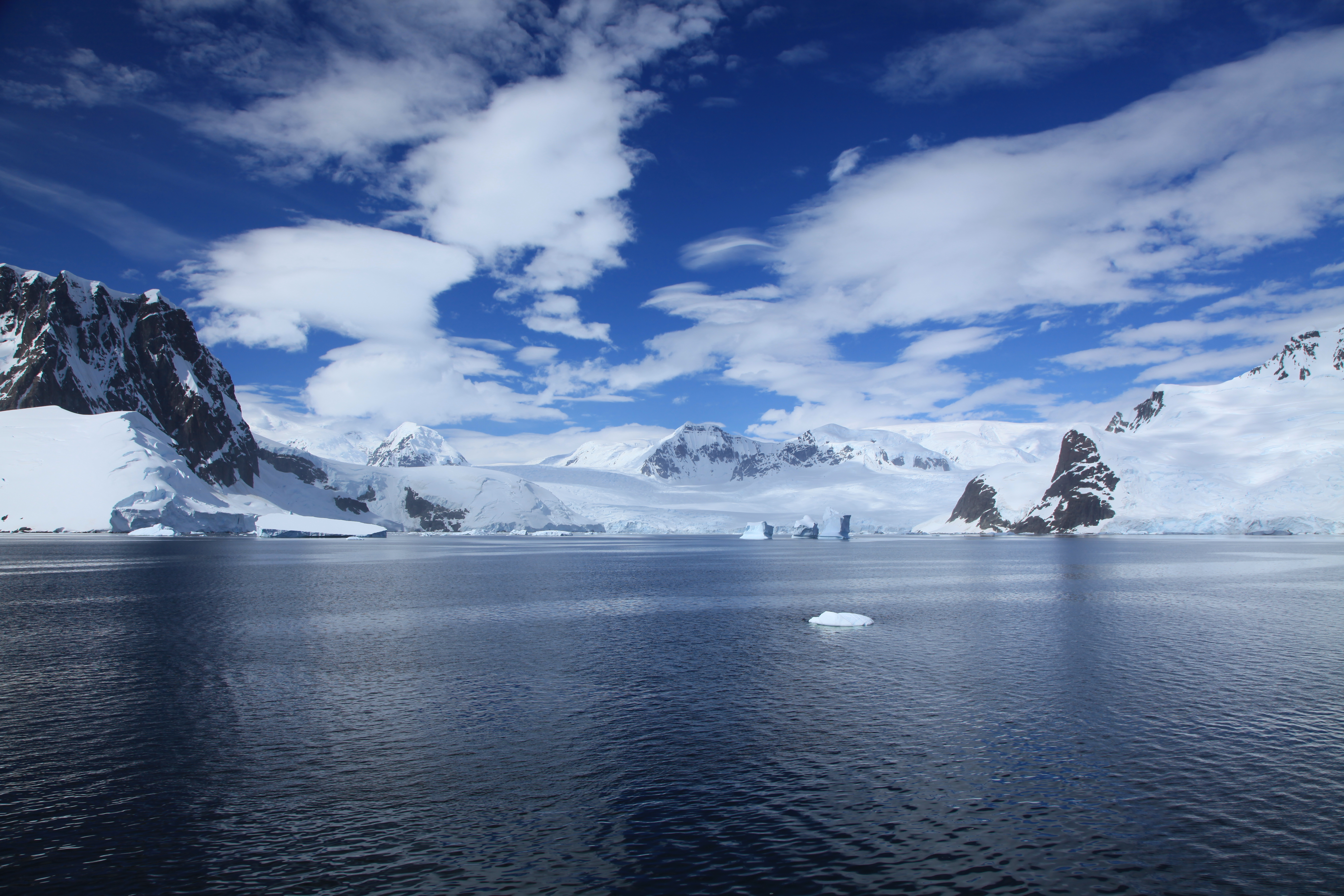
Penola Strait

== Sources ==
- Alberts, Fred G., ed. (1995), Geographic Names of the Antarctic (PDF) (2 ed.), United States Board on Geographic Names This article incorporates public domain material from websites or documents of the United States Board on Geographic Names.
- Graham Land and South Shetland Islands, BAS: British Antarctic Survey, 2005
- Higgins, Anthony K. (2010), "Exploration history and place names of northern East Greenland: Hovgaard Ø", Geological Survey of Denmark and Greenland Bulletin, vol. 21, Copenhagen, doi:10.34194/geusb.v21.4735, ISBN 978-87-7871-292-9
- Sailing Directions for Antarctica: Includes Islands South of Latitude 60.̊, United States. Defense Mapping Agency. Hydrographic Center, 1976 This article incorporates public domain material from websites or documents of the National Geospatial-Intelligence Agency.
