= Matty Island =

Uninhabited Canadian Arctic island

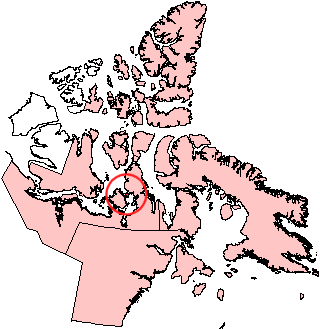
- Matty Island, Nunavut.

- Location within Nunavut Location within Canada

Geography
- Location: Rae Strait
- Coordinates: 69°29′N 95°40′W
- Archipelago: Arctic Archipelago
- Area: 477 km^{2} (184 sq mi)

Administration
- Canada
- Territory: Nunavut
- Region: Kitikmeot

Demographics
- Population: Uninhabited

Matty Island is one of the uninhabited members of the Canadian arctic islands in the Kitikmeot Region, Nunavut. It is located in Rae Strait, between King William Island and the Boothia Peninsula. Located at 69°29'N 95°40'W it has an area of 477 km^{2} (184 sq mi).

Other islands in the area include Beverly Islands to the south, and Tennent Islands to the west.
