= King William Island =

Island in Nunavut, Canada

Native name: Qikiqtaq

- Location within Nunavut Location within Canada

Geography
- Location: Northern Canada
- Coordinates: 69°10′N 97°25′W
- Archipelago: Arctic Archipelago
- Area: 13,174.63 km^{2} (5,086.75 sq mi) (2026)
- Area rank: 15th in Canada & 60th worldwide
- Coastline: 1,466 km (910.9 mi)
- Highest elevation: 141 m (463 ft)
- Highest point: Mount Matheson

Administration
- Canada
- Territory: Nunavut
- Largest settlement: Gjoa Haven (pop. 1,349)

Demographics
- Population: 1,349 (2021)
- Pop. density: 0.1/km^{2} (0.3/sq mi)
- Ethnic groups: Inuit

King William Island (Note: Inuktitut: Qikiqtaq, French: Île du Roi-Guillaume; previously: King William Land) is an island in the Kitikmeot Region of Nunavut, which is part of the Arctic Archipelago. In area it is 13,174.63 km^{2} (5,086.75 sq mi) making it the 60th-largest island in the world and Canada's 15th-largest island. Its population, as of the 2021 census, was 1,349, all of whom live in the island's only community, Gjoa Haven. (Note: The surrounding Census Subdivision, which includes the rest of King William Island, has a population of 0.) While searching for the Northwest Passage, a number of polar explorers visited, or spent their winters on, King William Island.

== Geography ==
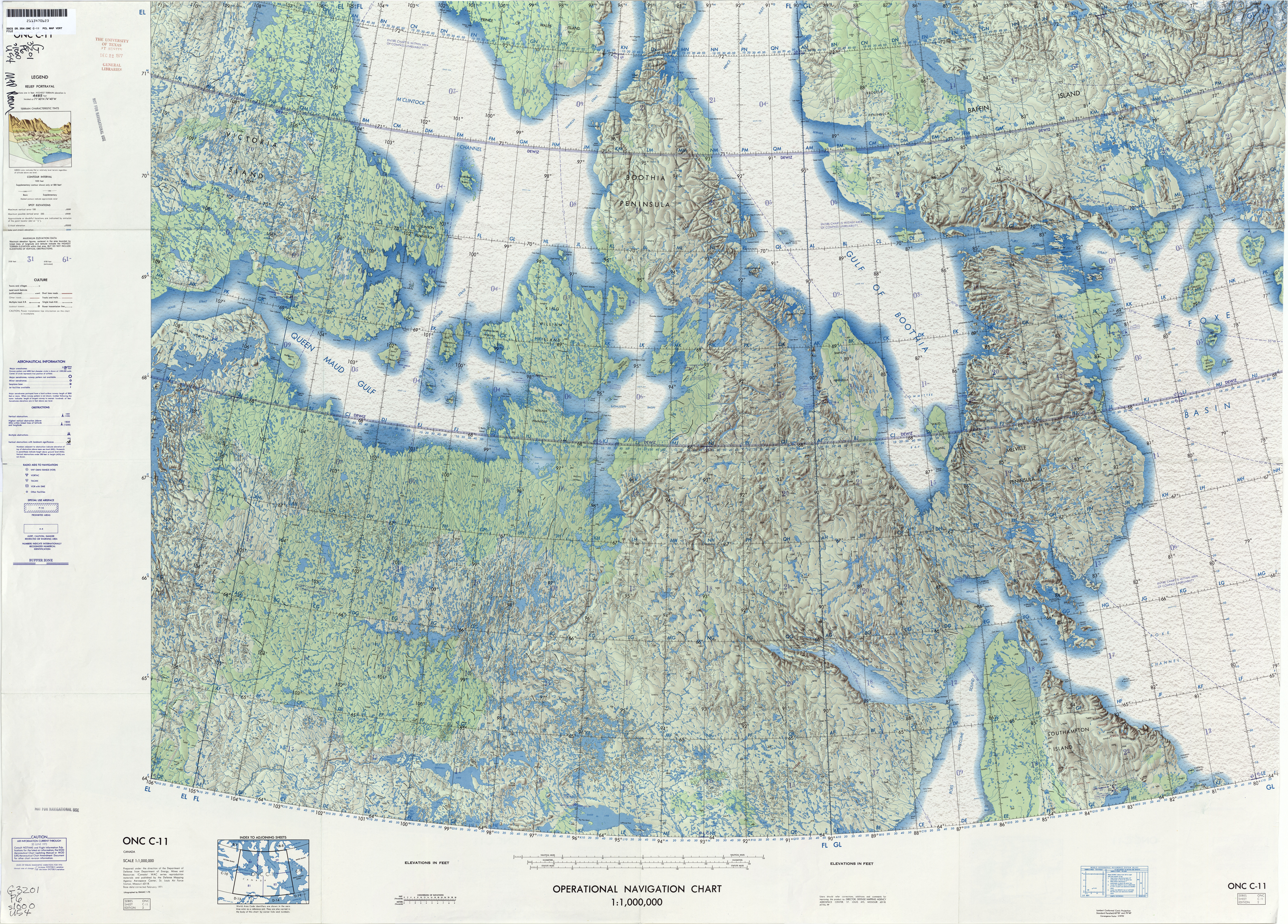
Map including King William Island

The island is separated from the Boothia Peninsula by the James Ross Strait to the northeast, and the Rae Strait to the east. To the west is the Victoria Strait and beyond it Victoria Island. Within the Simpson Strait, to the south of the island, is Todd Island, and beyond it, further to the south, is the Adelaide Peninsula. Queen Maud Gulf lies to the southwest. Some places on the coast are: (counter clockwise from the northern tip) Cape Felix, Victory Point and Gore Point at the mouth of Collinson Inlet, Point Le Vesconte, Erebus Bay, Cape Crozier, (south side) Terror Bay, Irving Islands, Washington Bay, Cape Herschel, Gladman Point, entrance to Simpson Strait, Todd Islets, (east side) Gjoa Haven, Matheson Peninsula, Latrobe Bay, Cape Norton at mouth of Peel Inlet, Matty Island, Tennent Islands, Clarence Islands, Cape Felix.

== Wildlife ==
The island is known for its large populations of barren-ground caribou, which summer there before migrating in the autumn by walking south over the sea ice.

== Role in Arctic exploration ==
=== Sir James Clark Ross ===
The island was long occupied by Inuit, who had a culture adapted to the extreme environment. In 1830, the British explorer James Clark Ross named it "King William Land" for King William IV the reigning monarch of the United Kingdom of Great Britain and Ireland; Ross thought at the time that it was a peninsula. Some sources credit his uncle, John Ross with naming the land. In 1834, George Back, another Arctic explorer, viewed its south shore from Chantrey Inlet and eventually recognised it as an island.

=== Sir John Franklin ===
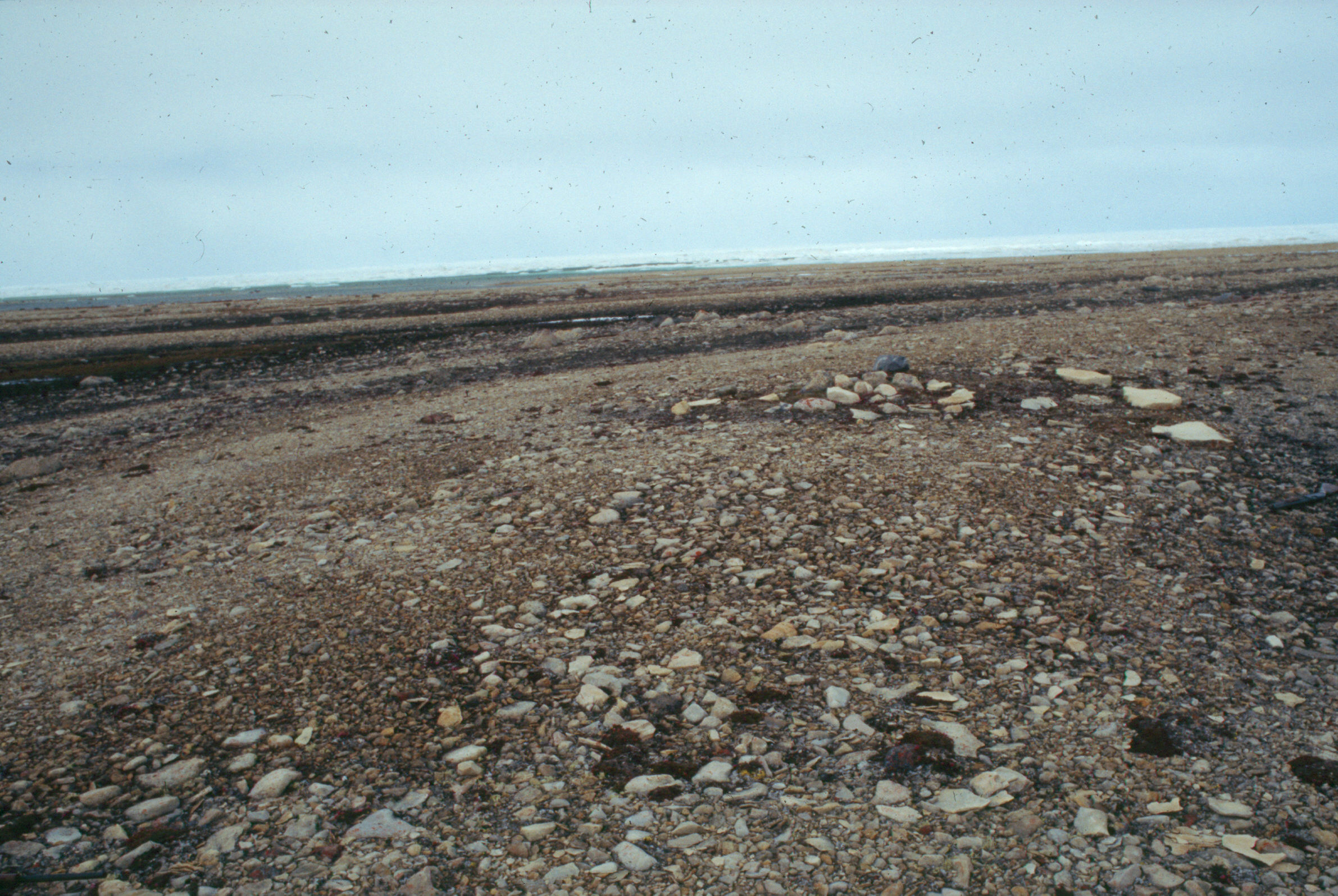
Summer camp of Sir John Franklin 5.3 km (3.3 mi) south of Cape Felix

Sir John Franklin, another British explorer, made an Arctic expedition looking for the Northwest Passage about a decade after Ross; his two ships became stranded in 1846 when frozen in the sea ice northwest of the island. After abandoning the two ships, most of the crew died from exposure and starvation as they attempted to walk south near the western coastline. Two of Franklin's men were buried at Hall Point on the island's south coast. The ships were believed lost forever, as many subsequent expeditions were unable to find them. As early as 1854, expeditions sent out to research the fate of Franklin's expedition discovered remains but were unable to find the two ships. On September 9, 2014, Canada's Prime Minister Stephen Harper announced that the Victoria Strait Expedition had located one of Franklin's two ships beneath shallow waters south of King William Island. It is preserved in very good condition; the side-scan sonar could detect the deck planking. By the beginning of October, the wreck had been identified as HMS Erebus. The other expedition vessel, HMS Terror, was found in 2016 in Terror Bay, off the south-west coast of King William Island.

=== Roald Amundsen ===
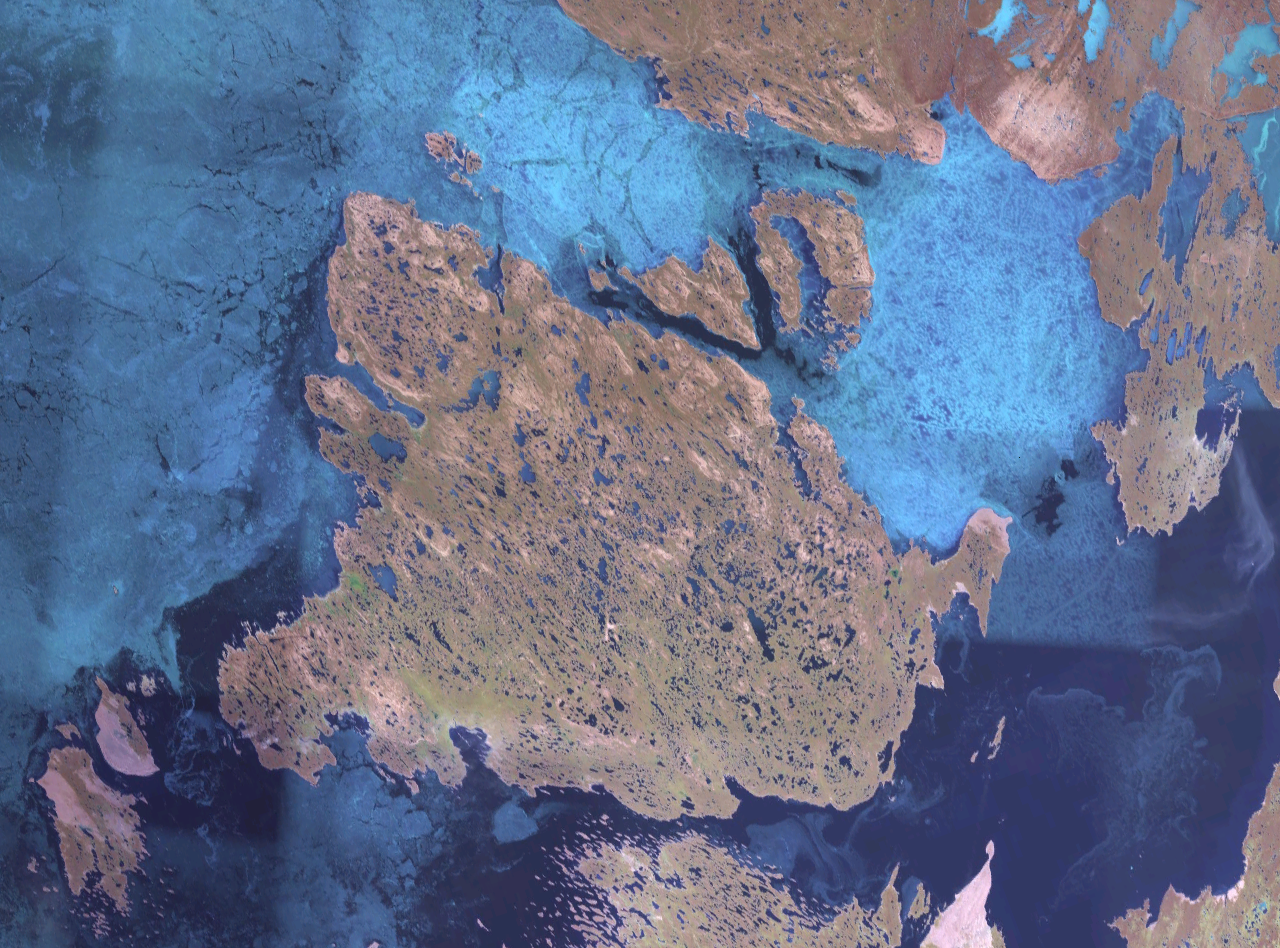
NASA Landsat satellite image of King William Island. North is to the upper left

In 1903, Norwegian explorer Roald Amundsen, looking for the Northwest Passage, sailed through the James Ross Strait and stopped at a natural harbour on the island's south coast. Unable to proceed due to sea ice, he spent the winters of 1903–1904 and 1904–1905 there. During his stays, he learned Arctic living skills from the local Netsilik. He used his ship Gjøa as a base for explorations in the summer of 1904, during which he travelled by dogsled on the Boothia Peninsula and to the North Magnetic Pole. After 22 months on the island, Amundsen left in August 1905. The harbour where he lived has the island's only settlement, Gjoa Haven. Amundsen used skills learned from the Inuit when he made his later expedition to the South Pole.

=== George Porter ===
George Porter was born on a whaling ship near Herschel Island in 1895 to Mary Kappak and W.P.S. Porter. George was schooled in Alaska. In 1913 he was a sailor on the Elvira and travelled with the explorer Vilhjalmur Stefansson. After briefly working as a reindeer herder in Siberia, he enlisted with the US military near the end of the First World War. In 1919, George was discharged from the Army in Iowa. In 1921 George sailed to Australia. Later George guided Royal Canadian Mounted Police (RCMP) commander Henry Larsen on many trips. George Porter eventually made Gjoa Haven on King William Island his home, where he worked as the manager of the Hudson's Bay Company trading post for a career of 25 years.

== Climate ==
Like many places in the high Arctic the island has a tundra climate (Köppen: ET), its winter is long and cold and the summers are cool, melting part of the ice; with low precipitation, it is a "cold desert".

Climate data for Gjoa Haven (Gjoa Haven Airport) Climate ID: 2302335; coordinates 68°38′08″N 95°51′01″W; elevation: 46.9 m (154 ft); 1991–2020 normals, extremes 1984–present
Month	Jan	Feb	Mar	Apr	May	Jun	Jul	Aug	Sep	Oct	Nov	Dec	Year
Record high humidex	−4.6	−11.3	−6.6	0.2	5.5	19.4	26.7	26.8	16.0	4.2	−0.6	−1.9	26.8
Record high °C (°F)	−4.4 (24.1)	−11.0 (12.2)	−5.0 (23.0)	1.0 (33.8)	6.5 (43.7)	20.8 (69.4)	24.4 (75.9)	24.0 (75.2)	15.4 (59.7)	4.5 (40.1)	−0.5 (31.1)	−2.0 (28.4)	24.4 (75.9)
Mean daily maximum °C (°F)	−29.6 (−21.3)	−30.3 (−22.5)	−25.4 (−13.7)	−15.9 (3.4)	−5.7 (21.7)	4.6 (40.3)	12.4 (54.3)	9.7 (49.5)	2.5 (36.5)	−5.7 (21.7)	−17.2 (1.0)	−24.6 (−12.3)	−10.4 (13.3)
Daily mean °C (°F)	−32.9 (−27.2)	−33.6 (−28.5)	−29.3 (−20.7)	−20.2 (−4.4)	−9.1 (15.6)	1.7 (35.1)	8.4 (47.1)	6.5 (43.7)	0.4 (32.7)	−8.4 (16.9)	−20.7 (−5.3)	−28.0 (−18.4)	−13.8 (7.2)
Mean daily minimum °C (°F)	−36.0 (−32.8)	−36.4 (−33.5)	−32.9 (−27.2)	−24.4 (−11.9)	−12.4 (9.7)	−1.1 (30.0)	4.2 (39.6)	3.3 (37.9)	−1.7 (28.9)	−11.1 (12.0)	−24.2 (−11.6)	−31.4 (−24.5)	−17.0 (1.4)
Record low °C (°F)	−48.3 (−54.9)	−50.2 (−58.4)	−46.3 (−51.3)	−41.1 (−42.0)	−28.2 (−18.8)	−17.0 (1.4)	−1.2 (29.8)	−5.0 (23.0)	−14.3 (6.3)	−32.0 (−25.6)	−39.4 (−38.9)	−44.0 (−47.2)	−50.2 (−58.4)
Record low wind chill	−64.2	−65.3	−66.5	−54.0	−39.4	−21.9	−6.8	−12.9	−21.2	−48.1	−55.0	−62.5	−66.5
Average precipitation mm (inches)	7.9 (0.31)	6.0 (0.24)	12.7 (0.50)	15.4 (0.61)	12.0 (0.47)	15.3 (0.60)	20.9 (0.82)	31.8 (1.25)	25.8 (1.02)	25.6 (1.01)	10.7 (0.42)	8.7 (0.34)	192.7 (7.59)
Average rainfall mm (inches)	0.0 (0.0)	0.0 (0.0)	0.0 (0.0)	0.0 (0.0)	1.3 (0.05)	11.7 (0.46)	19.4 (0.76)	30.4 (1.20)	14.0 (0.55)	1.1 (0.04)	0.0 (0.0)	0.0 (0.0)	34.6 (1.36)
Average snowfall cm (inches)	11.2 (4.4)	9.8 (3.9)	19.8 (7.8)	17.1 (6.7)	15.4 (6.1)	4.6 (1.8)	0.5 (0.2)	0.5 (0.2)	9.8 (3.9)	32.7 (12.9)	14.2 (5.6)	12.2 (4.8)	87.4 (34.4)
Average precipitation days (≥ 0.2 mm)	8.8	6.0	9.7	8.9	8.7	8.6	9.7	12.7	12.9	16.0	11.9	9.7	123.4
Average rainy days (≥ 0.2 mm)	0.0	0.0	0.0	0.0	0.63	5.6	8.8	11.4	7.7	0.53	0.0	0.0	34.7
Average snowy days (≥ 0.2 cm)	8.9	6.3	9.9	9.4	8.7	1.9	0.22	0.53	6.3	15.3	11.2	8.7	87.4
Average relative humidity (%) (at 1500 LST)	69.0	69.1	73.9	81.5	86.2	81.2	70.3	75.5	83.4	88.4	80.2	73.7	77.7
Source: Environment and Climate Change Canada

Climate data for Gladman Point Airport (abandoned DEW Line site, CAM-2) 68°40′N 97°48′W elevation: 25 m (82 ft), 1961-1990 normals
Month	Jan	Feb	Mar	Apr	May	Jun	Jul	Aug	Sep	Oct	Nov	Dec	Year
Record high °C (°F)	−5.0 (23.0)	−4.4 (24.1)	−1.7 (28.9)	2.2 (36.0)	3.9 (39.0)	21.1 (70.0)	24.4 (75.9)	23.9 (75.0)	13.9 (57.0)	6.7 (44.1)	−0.6 (30.9)	−4.0 (24.8)	24.4 (75.9)
Mean daily maximum °C (°F)	−30.8 (−23.4)	−31.5 (−24.7)	−27.3 (−17.1)	−17.2 (1.0)	−5.9 (21.4)	3.8 (38.8)	11.3 (52.3)	8.5 (47.3)	1.3 (34.3)	−7.8 (18.0)	−19.7 (−3.5)	−26.3 (−15.3)	−11.8 (10.8)
Daily mean °C (°F)	−34.2 (−29.6)	−34.9 (−30.8)	−31.4 (−24.5)	−22.0 (−7.6)	−9.8 (14.4)	1.0 (33.8)	7.2 (45.0)	5.2 (41.4)	−0.9 (30.4)	−11.2 (11.8)	−23.6 (−10.5)	−29.8 (−21.6)	−15.4 (4.4)
Mean daily minimum °C (°F)	−38.3 (−36.9)	−38.7 (−37.7)	−35.7 (−32.3)	−27.1 (−16.8)	−13.8 (7.2)	−2.0 (28.4)	3.1 (37.6)	1.9 (35.4)	−3.2 (26.2)	−14.6 (5.7)	−27.5 (−17.5)	−34.0 (−29.2)	−19.2 (−2.5)
Record low °C (°F)	−50.0 (−58.0)	−53.0 (−63.4)	−48.3 (−54.9)	−43.3 (−45.9)	−31.1 (−24.0)	−18.9 (−2.0)	−1.7 (28.9)	−6.1 (21.0)	−17.5 (0.5)	−33.4 (−28.1)	−46.7 (−52.1)	−47.2 (−53.0)	−53.0 (−63.4)
Average precipitation mm (inches)	1.7 (0.07)	2.3 (0.09)	2.5 (0.10)	5.5 (0.22)	9.4 (0.37)	10.0 (0.39)	23.5 (0.93)	25.9 (1.02)	18.9 (0.74)	13.2 (0.52)	5.0 (0.20)	2.3 (0.09)	120.4 (4.74)
Average rainfall mm (inches)	0.0 (0.0)	0.0 (0.0)	0.0 (0.0)	0.0 (0.0)	1.0 (0.04)	7.1 (0.28)	23.4 (0.92)	24.6 (0.97)	12.4 (0.49)	0.8 (0.03)	0.0 (0.0)	0.0 (0.0)	69.2 (2.72)
Average snowfall cm (inches)	1.7 (0.7)	2.3 (0.9)	2.5 (1.0)	5.5 (2.2)	8.4 (3.3)	3.0 (1.2)	0.2 (0.1)	1.3 (0.5)	6.5 (2.6)	12.4 (4.9)	5.0 (2.0)	2.3 (0.9)	51.2 (20.2)
Average precipitation days (≥ 0.2 mm)	2	2	2	3	6	5	8	10	10	8	4	2	63
Average rainy days (≥ 0.2 mm)	0	0	0	trace	trace	3	8	9	5	trace	0	0	26
Average snowy days (≥ 0.2 cm)	2	2	2	3	5	2	trace	1	5	8	4	2	38
Source: Environment and Climate Change Canada Canadian Climate Normals 1961-1990

== See also ==
- Royal eponyms in Canada
