= Rae Strait =

Strait in Nunavut, Canada

Coordinates: 68°49′59″N 094°50′59″W

Rae Strait is a small strait in the Kitikmeot Region of Nunavut, Canada. It is located between King William Island and the Boothia Peninsula on the mainland to the east. It is named after Scottish Arctic explorer John Rae who, in 1854, was the first European to visit the area while mapping the northern coast of North America.

At the time, King William Island was called King William Land, since it was thought to be adjoined to Boothia. On May 6, 1854, Rae and his two travelling companions reached a promontory on the western coast of Boothia which allowed them to look far west, at which point they realized King William Island was separated from the mainland. Said island protects the strait from the excessive flow of pack ice from the north, making its waters navigable for 19th-century ships.

This proved to be of vital importance for the eventual completion of the Northwest Passage by Roald Amundsen in 1903–06, since the Norwegian sailed through Rae Strait, wintering at Gjoa Haven on the southeastern tip of King William Island, then sailed along the Arctic coast into the Beaufort Sea.
