= 87th meridian west =

Line of longitude

87th meridian west (interactive map)

The meridian 87° west of Greenwich is a line of longitude that extends from the North Pole across the Arctic Ocean, North America, the Gulf of Mexico, the Caribbean Sea, Central America, the Pacific Ocean, the Southern Ocean, and Antarctica to the South Pole.

The 87th meridian west forms a great circle with the 93rd meridian east.

== From Pole to Pole ==
Starting at the North Pole and heading south to the South Pole, the 87th meridian west passes through:

Co-ordinates	Country, territory or sea	Notes
90°0′N 87°0′W	Arctic Ocean	
82°1′N 87°0′W	Canada	Nunavut — Ellesmere Island
80°44′N 87°0′W	Nansen Sound	
79°57′N 87°0′W	Canada	Nunavut — Axel Heiberg Island and Ellesmere Island
76°23′N 87°0′W	Jones Sound	
75°31′N 87°0′W	Canada	Nunavut — Devon Island
74°29′N 87°0′W	Lancaster Sound	
73°49′N 87°0′W	Canada	Nunavut — Baffin Island and Crown Prince Frederik Island
70°1′N 87°0′W	Gulf of Boothia	
69°15′N 87°0′W	Committee Bay	Passing just west of Wales Island, Nunavut, Canada (at 68°5′N 86°57′W)
67°21′N 87°0′W	Canada	Nunavut — mainland
65°2′N 87°0′W	Roes Welcome Sound	
63°51′N 87°0′W	Canada	Nunavut — Southampton Island
63°33′N 87°0′W	Hudson Bay	
55°55′N 87°0′W	Canada	Ontario — mainland and Slate Islands
48°37′N 87°0′W	Lake Superior	
46°31′N 87°0′W	United States	Michigan
45°49′N 87°0′W	Lake Michigan	
45°18′N 87°0′W	United States	Wisconsin — Door Peninsula
45°12′N 87°0′W	Lake Michigan	
41°41′N 87°0′W	United States	Indiana; Kentucky — from 37°55′N 87°0′W; Tennessee — from 36°39′N 87°0′W; Alabama — from 35°0′N 87°0′W; Florida — from 31°0′N 87°0′W
30°21′N 87°0′W	Gulf of Mexico	
21°34′N 87°0′W	Mexico	Quintana Roo — Yucatán Peninsula and island of Cozumel
20°17′N 87°0′W	Caribbean Sea	Passing just east of Banco Chinchorro, Mexico (at 18°41′N 87°14′W); Passing just west of the island of Útila, Honduras (at 16°5′N 86°59′W)
15°46′N 87°0′W	Honduras	
13°1′N 87°0′W	Nicaragua	
12°20′N 87°0′W	Pacific Ocean	Passing just east of Cocos Island, Costa Rica (at 5°32′N 87°2′W)
60°0′S 87°0′W	Southern Ocean	
72°53′S 87°0′W	Antarctica	Territory claimed by Chile (Antártica Chilena Province)

Next westward: 88th meridian west	87th meridian west forms a great circle with 93rd meridian east	Next eastward: 86th meridian west

== See also ==
- 86th meridian west
- 88th meridian west
