= 95th meridian =

95th meridian may refer to:

- 95th meridian east, a line of longitude east of the Greenwich Meridian
- 95th meridian west, a line of longitude west of the Greenwich Meridian

95th meridian west	95th meridian east
