= 93rd meridian =

93rd meridian may refer to:

- 93rd meridian east, a line of longitude east of the Greenwich Meridian
- 93rd meridian west, a line of longitude west of the Greenwich Meridian

93rd meridian west	93rd meridian east
