= 94th meridian =

94th meridian may refer to:

- 94th meridian east, a line of longitude east of the Greenwich Meridian
- 94th meridian west, a line of longitude west of the Greenwich Meridian

94th meridian west	94th meridian east
