= 86th meridian west =

Line of longitude

86th meridian west (interactive map)

The meridian 86° west of Greenwich is a line of longitude that extends from the North Pole across the Arctic Ocean, North America, the Gulf of Mexico, the Caribbean Sea, Central America, the Pacific Ocean, the Southern Ocean, and Antarctica to the South Pole.

The 86th meridian west forms a great circle with the 94th meridian east.

== From Pole to Pole ==
Starting at the North Pole and heading south to the South Pole, the 86th meridian west passes through:

Co-ordinates	Country, territory or sea	Notes
90°0′N 86°0′W	Arctic Ocean	
82°14′N 86°0′W	Canada	Nunavut — Ellesmere Island, Axel Heiberg Island, Stor Island and Ellesmere Island again
76°22′N 86°0′W	Jones Sound	
75°32′N 86°0′W	Canada	Nunavut — Devon Island
74°29′N 86°0′W	Lancaster Sound	
73°51′N 86°0′W	Canada	Nunavut — Baffin Island
73°19′N 86°0′W	Admiralty Inlet	
72°18′N 86°0′W	Canada	Nunavut — Yeoman Island
72°15′N 86°0′W	Admiralty Inlet	
71°46′N 86°0′W	Canada	Nunavut — Baffin Island
70°4′N 86°0′W	Gulf of Boothia	
68°0′N 86°0′W	Canada	Nunavut — Melville Peninsula (mainland)
66°1′N 86°0′W	Roes Welcome Sound	
65°41′N 86°0′W	Canada	Nunavut — Southampton Island
63°41′N 86°0′W	Hudson Bay	
55°40′N 86°0′W	Canada	Ontario
48°4′N 86°0′W	Lake Superior	Passing just west of Michipicoten Island, Ontario, Canada (at 47°43′N 85°57′W)
46°40′N 86°0′W	United States	Michigan — Upper Peninsula
45°57′N 86°0′W	Lake Michigan	
45°9′N 86°0′W	United States	Michigan — North Manitou Island and mainland Indiana — from 41°45′N 86°0′W; Kentucky — from 38°0′N 86°0′W; Tennessee — from 36°38′N 86°0′W; Alabama — from 35°0′N 86°0′W; Florida — from 31°0′N 86°0′W
30°16′N 86°0′W	Gulf of Mexico	
21°45′N 86°0′W	Caribbean Sea	Passing between the islands of Roatán (at 16°25′N 86°12′W) and Guanaja (at 16°24′N 85°58′W), Honduras
16°1′N 86°0′W	Honduras	
13°58′N 86°0′W	Nicaragua	
11°20′N 86°0′W	Pacific Ocean	Passing just west of Costa Rica (at 10°53′N 85°57′W)
60°0′S 86°0′W	Southern Ocean	
72°58′S 86°0′W	Antarctica	Territory claimed by Chile (Antártica Chilena Province)

Next westward: 87th meridian west	86th meridian west forms a great circle with 94th meridian east	Next eastward: 85th meridian west

== See also ==
- 85th meridian west
- 87th meridian west
