= La Manzanilla =

Town in La Huerta Municipality, Jalisco, Mexico

Coordinates: 19.283°N 104.788°W

La Manzanilla is a town located in La Huerta Municipality, Jalisco, Mexico. The village is located in the southeastern corner of the Bay of Tenacatita, on the Costalegre of southwestern mainland Mexico in the state of Jalisco. "Manzanilla" is Spanish for chamomille. The population was 1,592 according to the 2020 census.

The town is a popular beach destination for U.S., Canadian and local Mexican tourists. Many of the residents are employed in fishing, local palapa restaurants, small hotels, and grocery stores. La Manzanilla is approximately three and a half hours south of Puerto Vallarta and one hour north of Manzanillo by car.

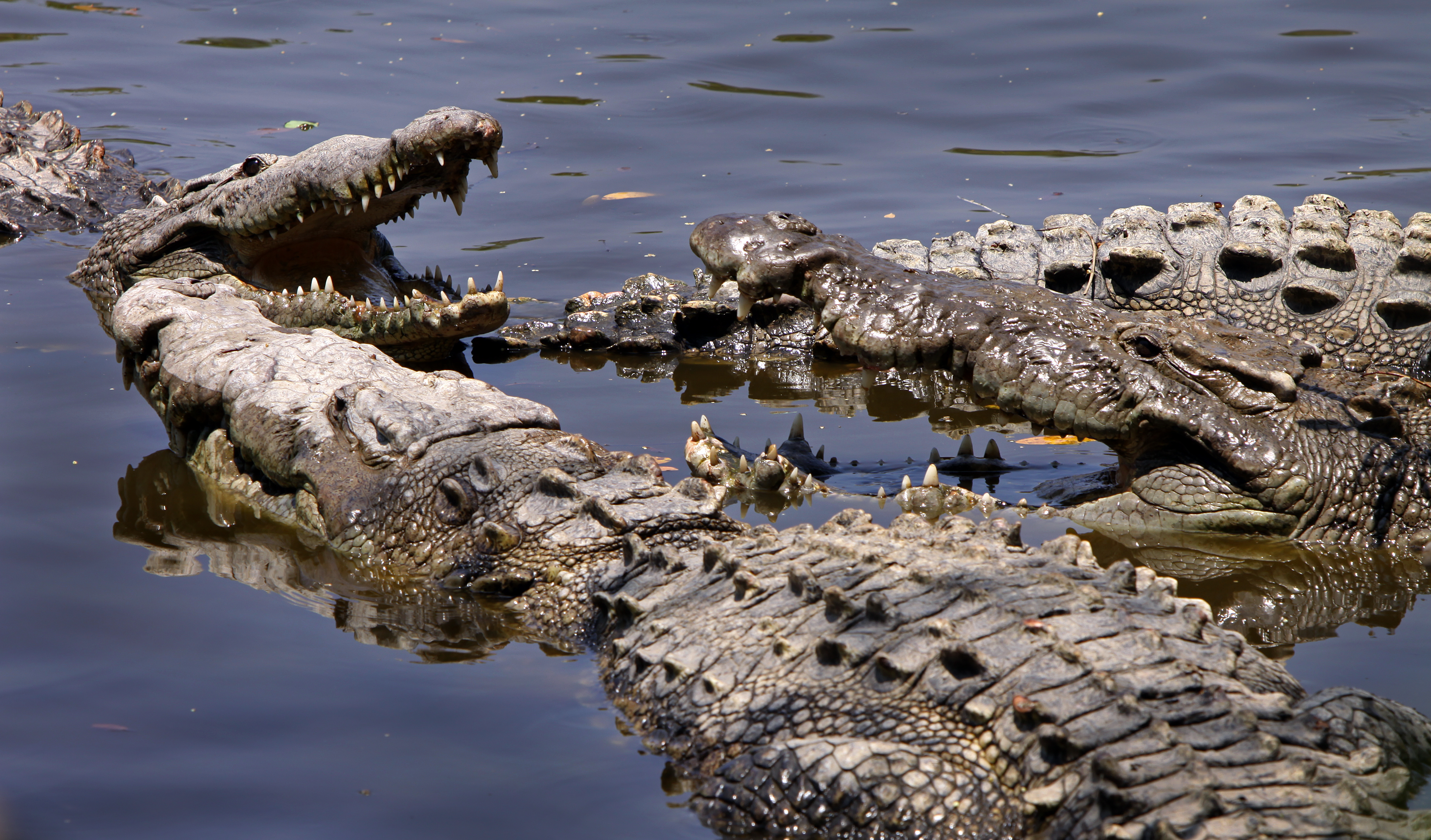
American crocodiles taking the sun in the lagoon in La Manzanilla

It has a population of about 300 American crocodiles in the nearby nature sanctuary.
