= Cozumel crocodile =

Scientific classification
- Kingdom: Animalia
- Phylum: Chordata
- Class: Reptilia
- Clade: Archosauria
- Order: Crocodilia
- Superfamily: Crocodyloidea
- Family: Crocodylidae
- Subfamily: Crocodylinae
- Genus: Crocodylus
- Species: C. sp.

Binomial name
- Crocodylus sp.

Proposed species of crocodile

Cozumel crocodiles, populations of crocodiles living on the island of Cozumel, were originally thought to be populations of American crocodiles. However, it is now believed they may be a separate species. The possibility was first introduced in a 2025 report, although the species has not been formally named.

== See also ==
- Banco Chinchorro crocodile
