= Banco Chinchorro crocodile =

Scientific classification
- Kingdom: Animalia
- Phylum: Chordata
- Class: Reptilia
- Clade: Archosauria
- Order: Crocodilia
- Superfamily: Crocodyloidea
- Family: Crocodylidae
- Subfamily: Crocodylinae
- Genus: Crocodylus
- Species: C. sp.

Binomial name
- Crocodylus sp.

Proposed species of crocodile

Banco Chinchorro crocodiles, populations of crocodiles living in Banco Chinchorro, were originally thought to be populations of American crocodiles. However, it is now believed they may be a separate species. The possibility was first introduced in a 2025 report, although the species has not been formally named.

== See also ==
- Cozumel crocodile
