= Banco Chinchorro =

Atoll reef off Quintana Roo in Mexico

Coordinates: 18°35′13″N 87°19′10″W

Designations

Ramsar Wetland
- Official name: Reserva de la Biosfera Banco Chinchorro
- Designated: 2 February 2004
- Reference no.: 1353

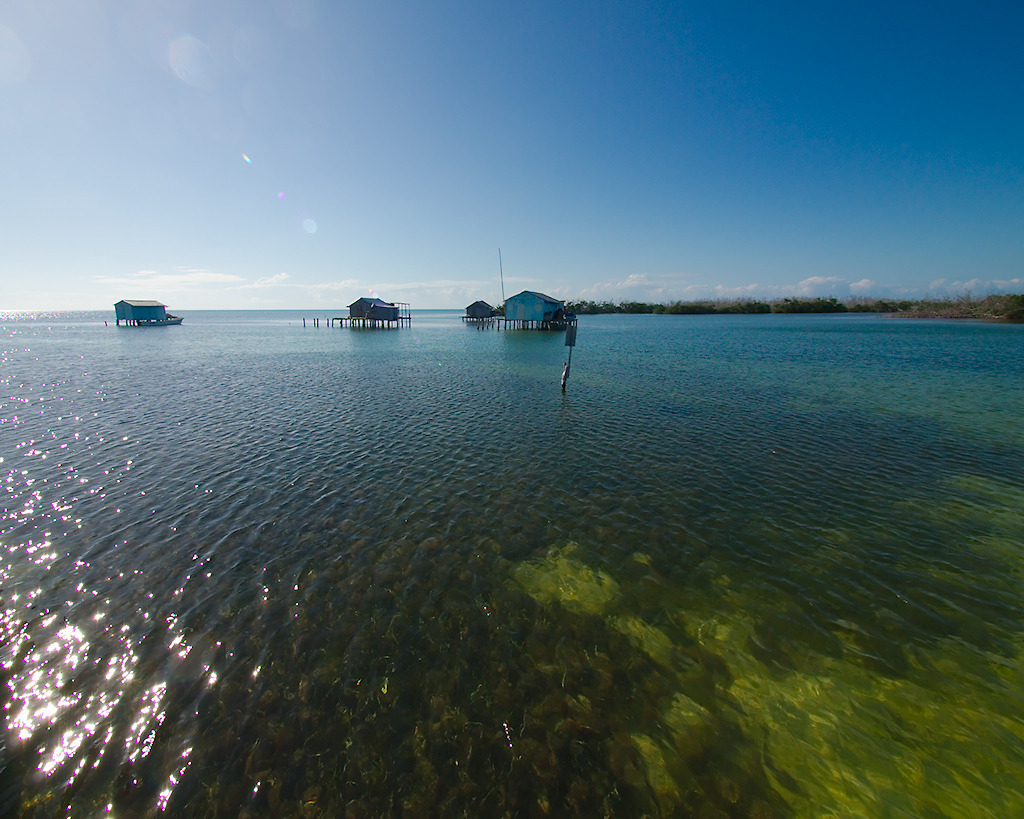
Stilt houses off the southwestern end of Cayo Centro on Banco Chinchorro

Banco Chinchorro is an atoll reef lying off the southeast coast of the Municipality of Othón P. Blanco in Quintana Roo, Mexico, near Belize. It was featured throughout the 2009 semi-documentary film Alamar by Pedro González-Rubio.

== Geography ==
The reef lies in Mexican waters 35 kilometres (22 mi) offshore in the Caribbean Sea, or about 80 kilometres (50 mi) east of the city of Chetumal. It is approximately 40.2 kilometres (25.0 mi) long from north to south, and approximately 16 kilometres (9.9 mi) wide at its widest point. It covers an area of 800 square kilometres (310 sq mi). The atoll has three islands, with an aggregate land area of 6.7 square kilometres (2.6 sq mi):

1. Cayo Norte (actually two separate islets) (0.9 km²)
2. Cayo Centro (5.6 km²)
3. Cayo Lobos (southernmost) (0.2 km²)

The natural vegetation of the islands is largely mangrove near the shore shading into open woodland more than 20 to 30 metres (66 to 98 ft) from the shore. There is a crocodile reserve on the southernmost (and biggest) island. The crocodiles were once thought to be American crocodiles, but it is now believed they are a unique species. The islands (in common with many isolated tropical islands) are thickly populated with small crabs, which are tame and can be trodden on inadvertently by visitors.

Some of the islands are inhabited by fishermen, who live in stilt houses about 60 to 100 metres (200 to 330 ft) offshore to circumvent local regulations forbidding private construction.

== Shipwrecks ==
The reef is home to at least nine shipwrecks, including two Spanish Galleons. The names of the known wrecked ships are: SS Caldera, SS Escasell, SS Far Star, SS Ginger Screw, SS Glen View, SS Penelopez, SS San Andreas, and SS Tropic. There is also a large ferry from Cozumel that washed up on Chinchorro during Hurricane Wilma.
