= 85th meridian west =

Line of longitude

85th meridian west

The meridian 85° west of Greenwich is a line of longitude that extends from the North Pole across the Arctic Ocean, North America, the Gulf of Mexico, the Caribbean Sea, Central America, the Pacific Ocean, the Southern Ocean, and Antarctica to the South Pole.

The 85th meridian west forms a great circle with the 95th meridian east.

== From Pole to Pole ==
Starting at the North Pole and heading south to the South Pole, the 85th meridian west passes through:

Co-ordinates	Country, territory or sea	Notes
90°0′N 85°0′W	Arctic Ocean	
82°28′N 85°0′W	Canada	Nunavut — Ellesmere Island and Axel Heiberg Island
79°15′N 85°0′W	Eureka Sound	
78°54′N 85°0′W	Canada	Nunavut — Ellesmere Island, Hoved Island and Ellesmere Island again
76°17′N 85°0′W	Jones Sound	
75°40′N 85°0′W	Canada	Nunavut — Devon Island
74°38′N 85°0′W	Parry Channel	
73°47′N 85°0′W	Canada	Nunavut — Baffin Island
73°39′N 85°0′W	Admiralty Inlet	
73°21′N 85°0′W	Canada	Nunavut — Baffin Island
70°5′N 85°0′W	Fury and Hecla Strait	
69°48′N 85°0′W	Canada	Nunavut — Melville Peninsula (mainland), White Island and Southampton Island
63°10′N 85°0′W	Hudson Bay	
55°16′N 85°0′W	Canada	Northern Ontario
47°35′N 85°0′W	Lake Superior	
46°46′N 85°0′W	United States	Michigan
46°0′N 85°0′W	Lake Michigan	
45°39′N 85°0′W	United States	Michigan; Indiana — from 41°45′N 85°0′W; Kentucky — from 38°46′N 85°0′W; Tennessee — from 36°37′N 85°0′W; Georgia — from 35°0′N 85°0′W; Alabama — from 32°31′N 85°0′W; Georgia — for about 3 km from 32°21′N 85°0′W; Alabama — from 32°19′N 85°0′W; Georgia — from 32°11′N 85°0′W; Florida — from 31°0′N 85°0′W, the mainland and St. George Island
29°36′N 85°0′W	Gulf of Mexico	Passing just west of Cuba (at 21°52′N 84°57′W)
21°50′N 85°0′W	Caribbean Sea	
15°59′N 85°0′W	Honduras	
14°43′N 85°0′W	Nicaragua	Passing through Lake Nicaragua
10°58′N 85°0′W	Costa Rica	
9°44′N 85°0′W	Pacific Ocean	
60°0′S 85°0′W	Southern Ocean	
73°25′S 85°0′W	Antarctica	Territory claimed by Chile (Antártica Chilena Province)

== See also ==
- 84th meridian west
- 86th meridian west
