= 94th meridian east =

Line of longitude

94th meridian east

The meridian 94° east of Greenwich is a line of longitude that extends from the North Pole across the Arctic Ocean, Asia, the Indian Ocean, the Southern Ocean, and Antarctica to the South Pole.

The 94th meridian east forms a great circle with the 86th meridian west.

== From Pole to Pole ==
Starting at the North Pole and heading south to the South Pole, the 94th meridian east passes through:

| Co-ordinates | Country, territory or sea | Notes |
|---|---|---|
| 90°0′N 94°0′E | Arctic Ocean | |
| 81°2′N 94°0′E | Russia | Krasnoyarsk Krai — Komsomolets Island and October Revolution Island, Severnaya Zemlya |
| 79°26′N 94°0′E | Kara Sea | Passing just east of Voronina Island, Krasnoyarsk Krai, Russia (at 78°9′N 93°55′E) |
| 76°36′N 94°0′E | Russia | Krasnoyarsk Krai — Nordenskiöld Archipelago |
| 76°34′N 94°0′E | Kara Sea | |
| 76°7′N 94°0′E | Russia | Krasnoyarsk Krai; Tuva Republic — from 52°39′N 94°0′E |
| 50°35′N 94°0′E | Mongolia | |
| 44°45′N 94°0′E | People's Republic of China | Xinjiang; Gansu — from 41°5′N 94°0′E; Qinghai — from 38°43′N 94°0′E; Tibet — from 32°27′N 94°0′E |
| 28°50′N 94°0′E | India | Arunachal Pradesh — claimed by People's Republic of China; Assam — from 27°20′N 94°0′E; Nagaland — from 26°9′N 94°0′E; Manipur — from 25°31′N 94°0′E |
| 23°55′N 94°0′E | Myanmar (Burma) | |
| 18°44′N 94°0′E | Indian Ocean | Passing just east of Barren Island, Andaman Islands, India (at 12°17′N 93°53′E); Passing just east of the island of Great Nicobar, India (at 7°0′N 93°57′E) |
| 60°0′S 94°0′E | Southern Ocean | |
| 66°31′S 94°0′E | Antarctica | Australian Antarctic Territory, claimed by Australia |

| Next westward: 93rd meridian east | 94th meridian east forms a great circle with 86th meridian west | Next eastward: 95th meridian east |
