= 93rd meridian east =

Line of longitude

93rd meridian east

The meridian 93° east of Greenwich is a line of longitude that extends from the North Pole across the Arctic Ocean, Asia, the Indian Ocean, the Southern Ocean, and Antarctica to the South Pole.

The 93rd meridian east forms a great circle with the 87th meridian west.

== From Pole to Pole ==
Starting at the North Pole and heading south to the South Pole, the 93rd meridian east passes through:

Co-ordinates	Country, territory or sea	Notes
90°0′N 93°0′E	Arctic Ocean	
80°50′N 93°0′E	Russia	Krasnoyarsk Krai — Komsomolets Island, Pioneer Island, October Revolution Island and the Sedov Archipelago, Severnaya Zemlya
79°24′N 93°0′E	Kara Sea	
76°3′N 93°0′E	Russia	Krasnoyarsk Krai; Tuva Republic — from 51°55′N 93°0′E
50°47′N 93°0′E	Mongolia	For about 11 km
50°41′N 93°0′E	Russia	Tuva Republic — for about 10 km
50°36′N 93°0′E	Mongolia	
45°1′N 93°0′E	People's Republic of China	Xinjiang; Gansu — from 40°29′N 93°0′E; Qinghai — from 39°8′N 93°0′E; Tibet — from 32°44′N 93°0′E
28°15′N 93°0′E	India	Arunachal Pradesh. Assam — from 26°56′N 93°0′E; Mizoram — from 24°24′N 93°0′E; Manipur — for 5 km from 24°9′N 93°0′E; Mizoram — from 24°6′N 93°0′E
22°4′N 93°0′E	Myanmar (Burma)	
19°54′N 93°0′E	Indian Ocean	Bay of Bengal
13°40′N 93°0′E	India	North Andaman Island and Ritchie's Archipelago, Andaman Islands
11°56′N 93°0′E	Indian Ocean	Passing just east of the island of Car Nicobar, Nicobar Islands, India (at 9°10′N 92°50′E); Passing just west of the island of Teressa, Nicobar Islands, India (at 8°17′N 93°5′E)
60°0′S 93°0′E	Southern Ocean	Passing just east of Drygalski Island, claimed by Australia (at 65°45′S 92°43′E)
66°33′S 93°0′E	Antarctica	Australian Antarctic Territory, claimed by Australia

Next westward: 92nd meridian east	93rd meridian east forms a great circle with 87th meridian west	Next eastward: 94th meridian east
