= Crown Prince Frederik Island =

Island in Nunavut, Canada

- Location within Nunavut Location within Canada

Geography
- Location: Gulf of Boothia
- Coordinates: 70°02′N 86°50′W
- Archipelago: Arctic Archipelago
- Area: 401 km^{2} (155 sq mi)

Administration
- Canada
- Territory: Nunavut
- Region: Qikiqtaaluk

Demographics
- Population: Uninhabited

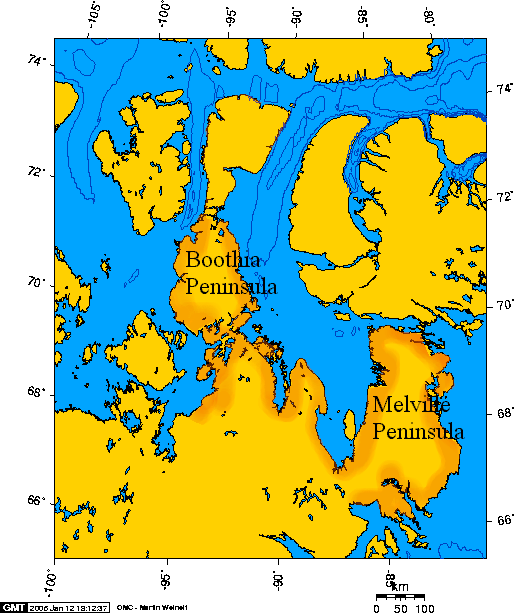
Booth and Melville Peninsula

Crown Prince Frederik Island (French: Île du Prince-Héritier-Frederik) is an island in Nunavut, Canada. It is located off the southern coast of western Baffin Island, in the Qikiqtaaluk Region's side of the Gulf of Boothia. It has an area of 401 km^{2} (155 sq mi).
