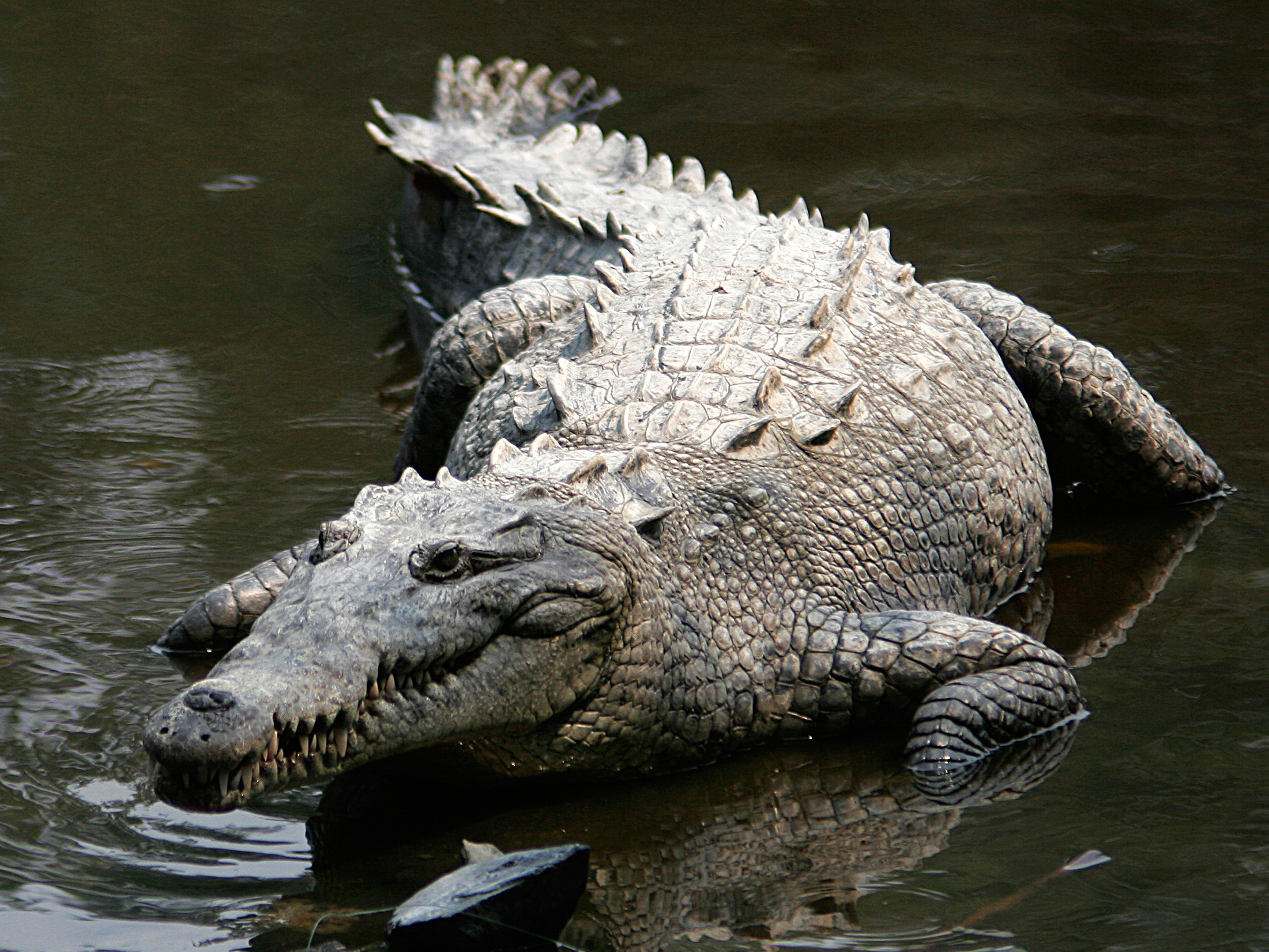
- At La Manzanilla, Jalisco, Mexico

Conservation status
- Vulnerable (IUCN 3.1)
- CITES Appendix I (Note: Except population of Integrated Management District of Mangroves of the Bay of Cispata, Tinajones, La Balsa and Surrounding Areas, Department of Córdoba, Colombia, and populations of Cuba and Mexico, which are included in Appendix II.)

Scientific classification
- Kingdom: Animalia
- Phylum: Chordata
- Class: Reptilia
- Order: Crocodylia
- Family: Crocodylidae
- Genus: Crocodylus
- Species: C. acutus

Binomial name
- Crocodylus acutus Cuvier, 1807
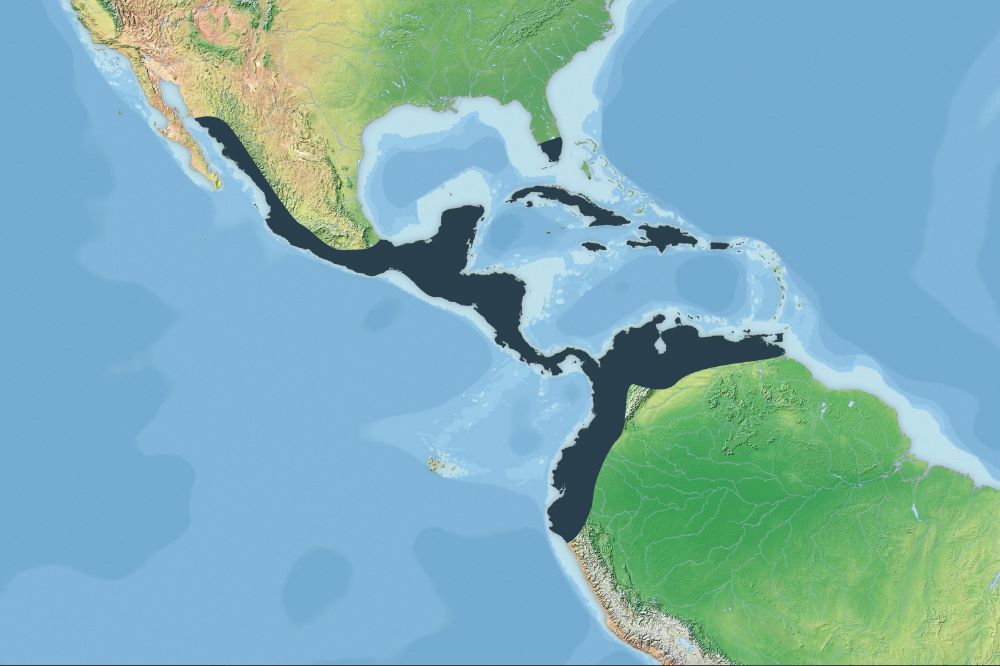
- Distribution range of C. acutus

Synonyms
- Crocodylus americanus? Laurenti, 1768; Lacerta alligator? Blumenbach, 1779; Crocodylus caudiverbera? Bonnaterre, 1789; Crocodylus floridanus Hornaday, 1875

= American crocodile =

American crocodile Temporal range: Pleistocene–Present, 2.6–0 Ma

Species of crocodile from the Neotropics

The American crocodile (Crocodylus acutus) is a species of crocodilian found in the Neotropics. It is the most widespread of the four extant species of crocodiles from the Americas, with populations present from South Florida, the Caribbean islands of Cuba, Jamaica, and Hispaniola, and the coasts of Mexico to as far south as Peru, Ecuador, Colombia, and Venezuela.

The habitat of the American crocodile consists largely of coastal areas. It is also found in river systems, but tends to prefer salinity, resulting in the species congregating in brackish lakes, mangrove swamps, lagoons, cays, and small islands. Other crocodiles also have tolerance to saltwater due to salt glands underneath the tongue, but the American crocodile is the only species other than the saltwater crocodile to commonly live and thrive in saltwater. They can be found on beaches and small island formations without any freshwater source, such as many cays and islets across the Caribbean. They are also found in hypersaline lakes; one of the largest known populations inhabits Lago Enriquillo in the Dominican Republic.

The American crocodile is one of the largest crocodile species. Males can reach lengths of more than 7 m (23 ft 0 in), weighing over 1,000 kilograms (2,200 lb). On average, mature males are more in the range of 2.9 to 4.1 m (9 ft 6 in to 13 ft 5 in) in length and weigh up to about 400 kg (880 lb). As with other crocodile species, females are smaller, rarely exceeding 3.8 m (12 ft 6 in) in length even in the largest-bodied population.

Like any other large crocodilian, the American crocodile is potentially dangerous to humans, but it tends not to be as aggressive as some other species. American crocodiles coexist with the American alligator in Florida, and with the smaller spectacled caiman within Central America and South America. The IUCN lists the American crocodile as vulnerable, and is a federally threatened, flagship species and ecological indicator within the Florida Everglades World Heritage Site.

== Taxonomy and etymology ==
The American crocodile was described by Georges Cuvier in 1807, and became known as the "sharp-snout alligator". In 1822, Constantine Samuel Rafinesque postulated that the species was in fact a crocodile.

The species was redescribed as Crocodylus floridanus by William Temple Hornaday in 1875, when Hornaday and C. E. Jackson were sent to Florida to collect alligator hides. Upon hearing of a "big old gator" in Arch Creek at the head of Biscayne Bay, Hornaday and his companions searched for it and reported:

In a few hours, we got sight of him, out on the bank in a saw-grass wallow. He was a monster for size—a perfect whale of a saurian, gray in color—and by all the powers, he was a genuine crocodile!

Crocodylus floridanus is now considered an invalid junior synonym of C. acutus.

Recent genetic assays indicate that Jamaican populations of the American crocodile may be genetically distinct from the sympatric Cuban crocodile, despite a significant history of hybridization. Further comparative genetic analyses of Caribbean populations of the American and Cuban crocodile indicate that insular populations of Cozumel and Banco Chinchorro crocodiles may be genetically distinct species.

== Evolution ==
Until 2020, the evolution of the American crocodile was poorly understood. However, the discovery of the Miocene species Crocodylus checchiai indicates that it, the Orinoco crocodile (Crocodylus intermedius), Morelet's crocodile (C. moreletii), and the Cuban crocodile (C. rhombifer) all share an ancestor hailing from Africa. The newly discovered animal may also represent the base of the evolutionary radiation of these animals, representing the missing link between crocodiles in Africa and the Americas.

The genus Crocodylus likely originated in Africa and radiated outward toward Southeast Asia and the Americas, although an Australia/Asia origin has also been considered. Phylogenetic evidence supports Crocodylus diverging from its closest recent relative, the extinct Voay of Madagascar, around 25 million years ago, near the Oligocene/Miocene boundary. American crocodile populations in Florida, Jamaica and Hispaniola (in the Dominican Republic) differ in gene frequencies. The only confirmed fossil of an American crocodile has been recovered from the Early/Middle Pleistocene Río Tomayate locality of El Salvador, although another find may have been recovered from Florida.

Below is a cladogram based on a 2018 tip dating study by Lee & Yates simultaneously using morphological, molecular (DNA sequencing), and stratigraphic (fossil age) data, as revised by the 2021 Hekkala et al. paleogenomics study using DNA extracted from the extinct Voay.

- Crocodylus
  - - - - - - - Crocodylus johnstoni Freshwater crocodile
      - - - - - Crocodylus novaeguineae New Guinea crocodile
          - - - Crocodylus halli Hall's New Guinea crocodile
        - - - - Crocodylus mindorensis Philippine crocodile
    - - - - - - Crocodylus porosus Saltwater crocodile
      - - - - - Crocodylus siamensis Siamese crocodile
        - - - - Crocodylus palustris Mugger crocodile
  - - - - - - - Crocodylus suchus West African crocodile
      - - - - - Crocodylus niloticus Nile crocodile
        - - - - Crocodylus rhombifer Cuban crocodile
          - - - Crocodylus intermedius Orinoco crocodile
              - Crocodylus acutus American crocodile
            - - Crocodylus moreletii Morelet's crocodile
    - - Crocodylus checchiai †
      - Crocodylus falconensis †

== Description ==
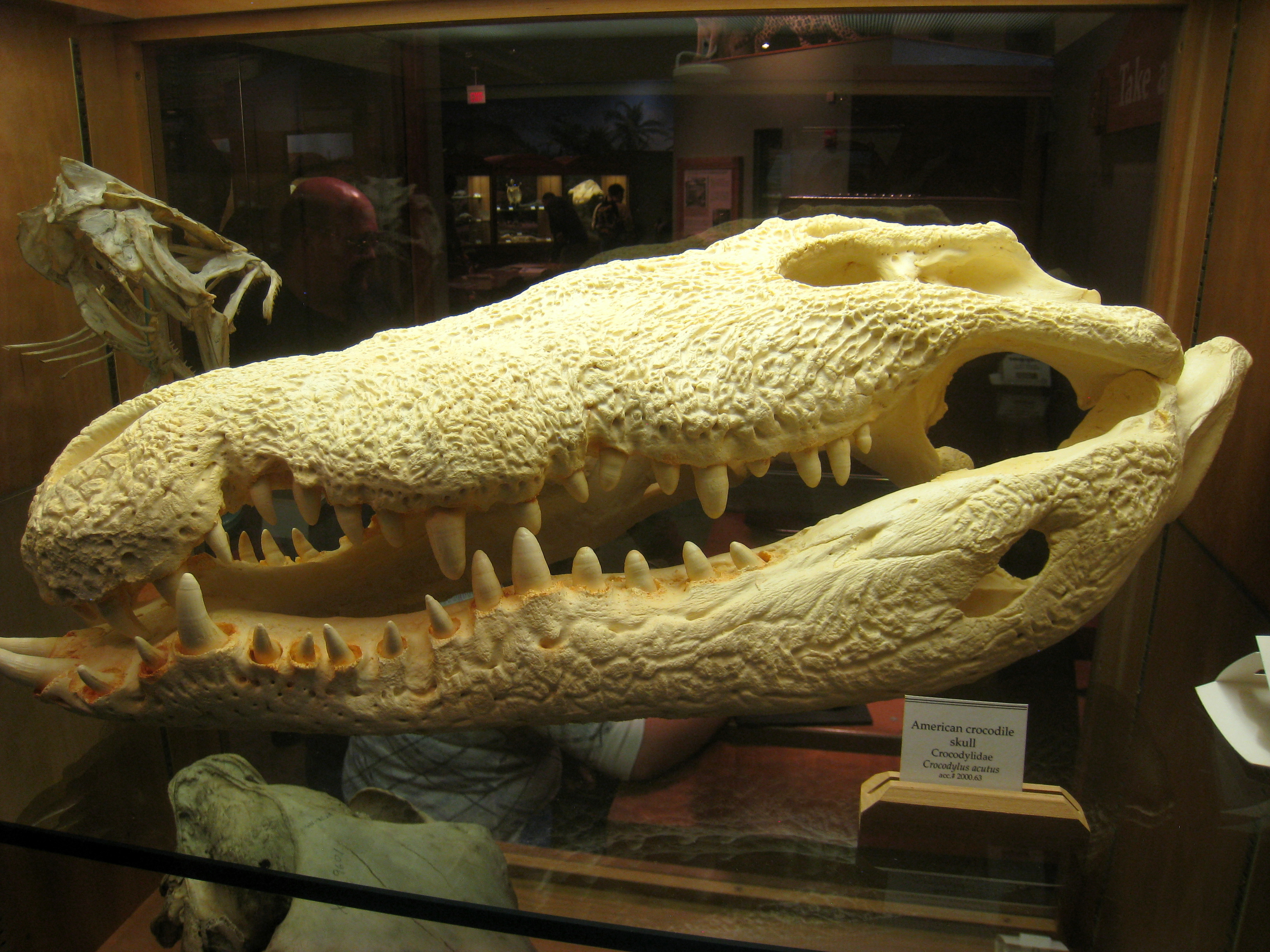
Skull

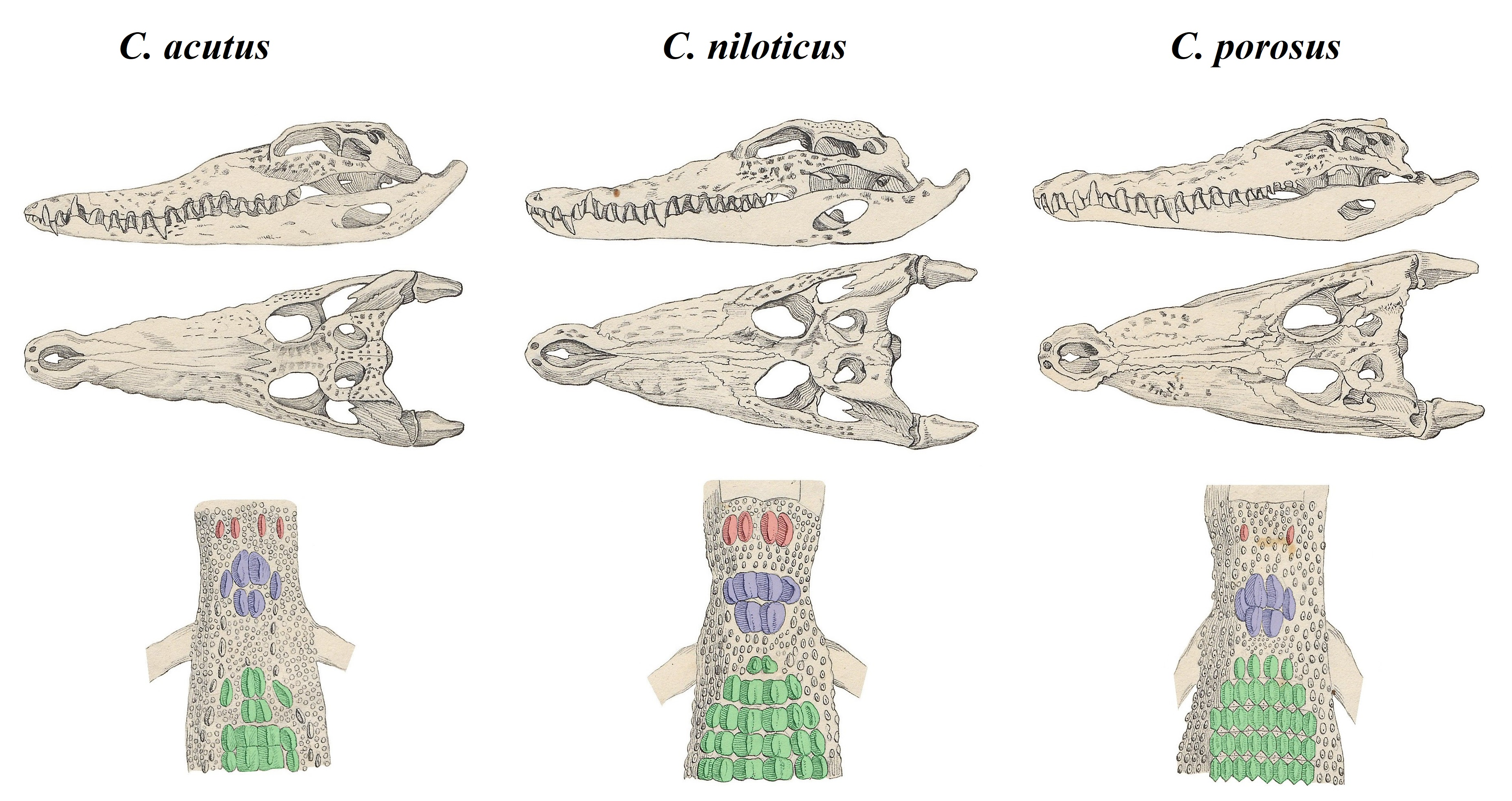
Osteoderm arrangement of the American crocodile (left) compared to the Nile crocodile (center) and saltwater crocodile (right)

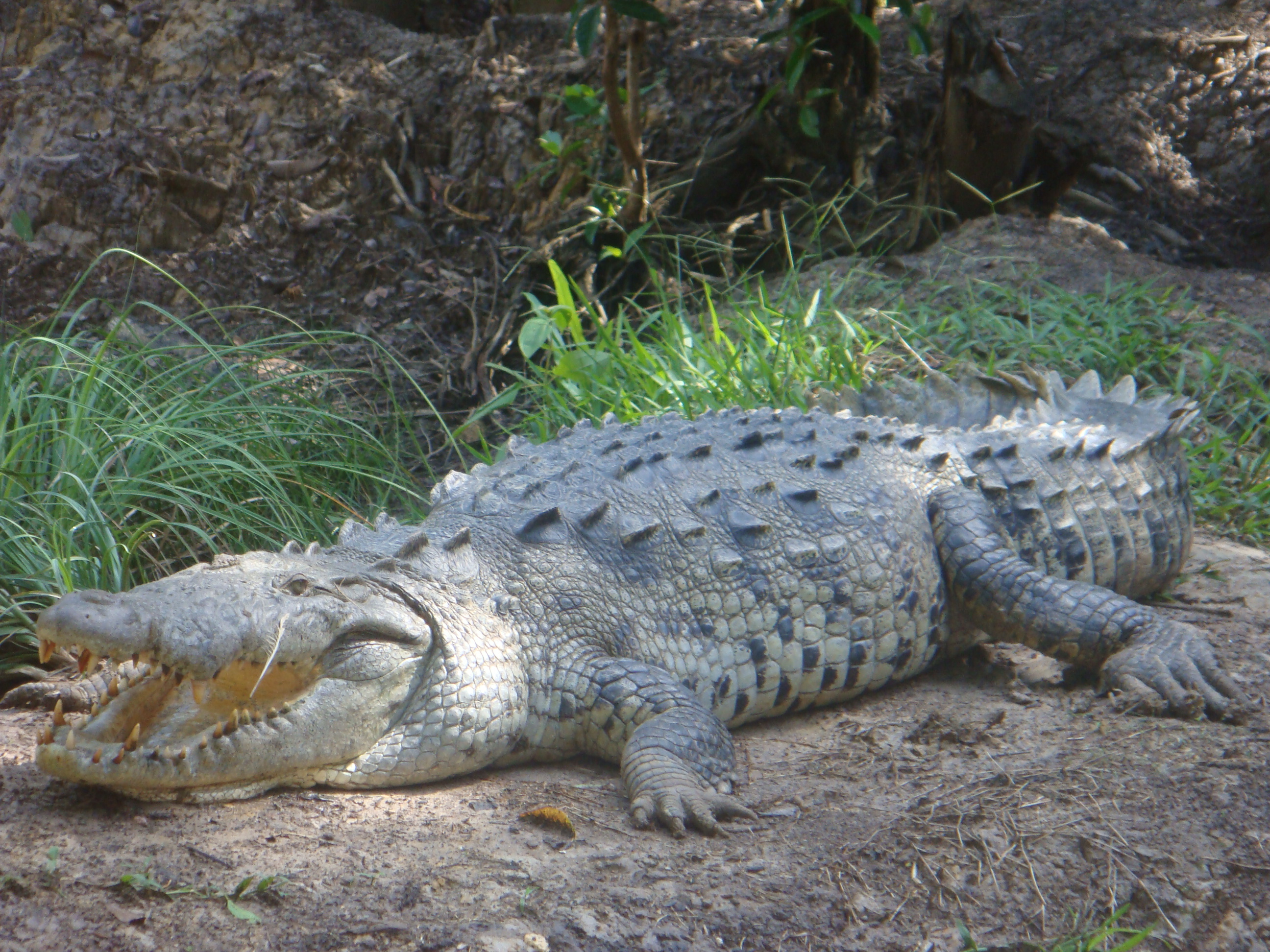
In Florida

Like all true crocodilians, the American crocodile is a quadruped, with short, stocky legs; a long, powerful tail; and a scaly hide with rows of ossified scutes running down its back and tail. Individuals can be identified by using multiple dorsal scute patterns. The American crocodile has the most reduced dorsal osteoderms amongst all living crocodilians. Its snout is elongated and includes a strong pair of jaws. A 3.2-metre (10 ft 6 in), 164-kilogram (362 lb) specimen had a bite force of 4,355 N (979 lb_{f}). Its eyes have nictitating membranes for protection, along with lacrimal glands, which produce tears.

The nostrils, eyes, and ears are situated on the top of its head, so the rest of the body can be concealed underwater for surprise attacks. The snout is longer and narrower than that of the American alligator, but broader on average than that of the Orinoco crocodile. American crocodiles are also paler and more grayish than the relatively dark-hued American alligator. As juveniles, they bear distinct dark cross-marks but typically lose them with age.

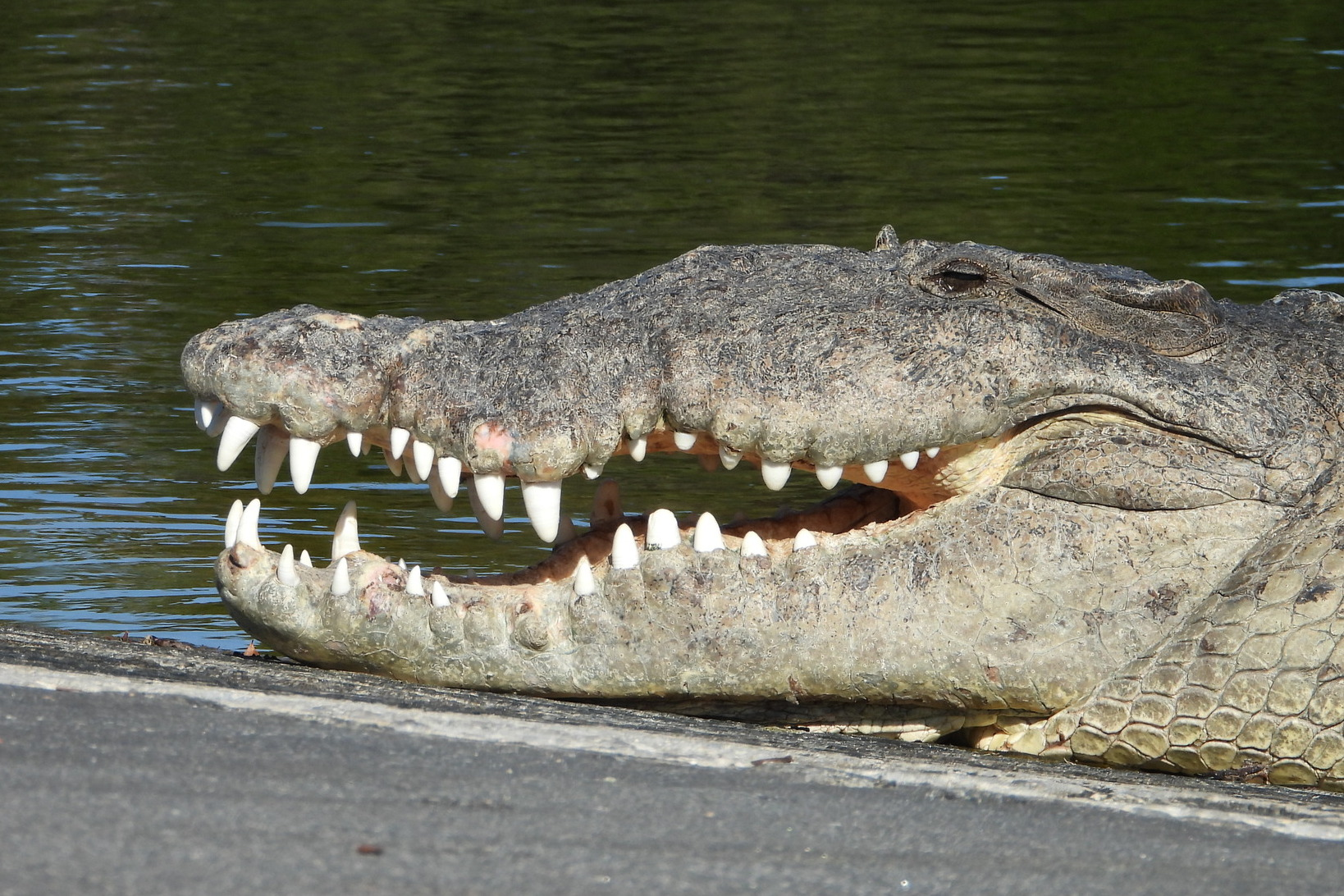
Large individual showing the pronounced hump in front of the eyes, in the Florida Everglades

The American crocodile is sometimes confused with the Morelet's crocodile, a smaller species that is native to Mexico.

American crocodiles have a distinctive bump halfway down the snout, in front of the eyes. This bump has been referred to as the "medial rostral boss", "medial preorbital hump", or "median preorbital elevation". The other 3 Crocodylus species of the Americas also have this feature, though to a lesser degree.

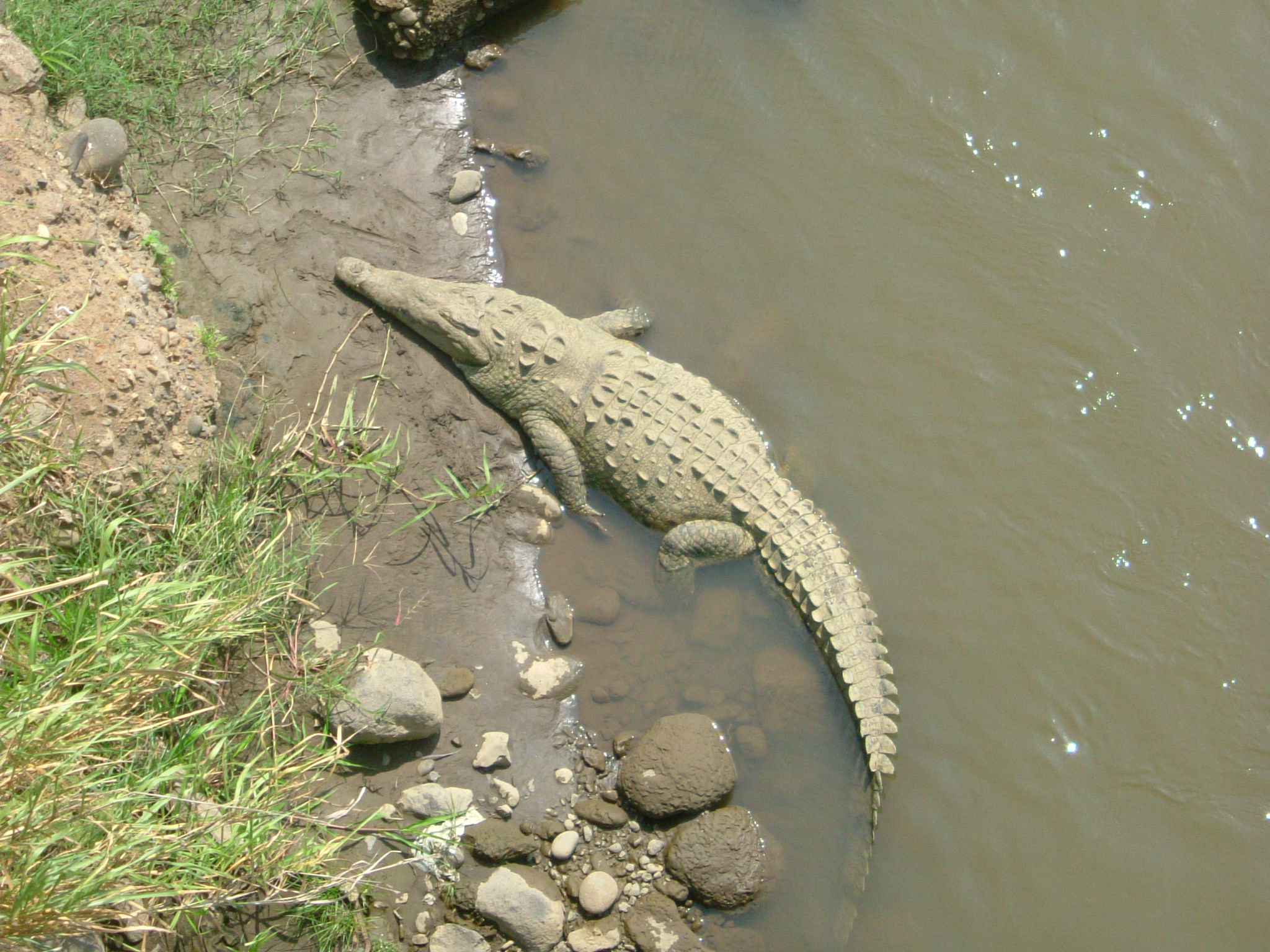
In Costa Rica

=== Size ===
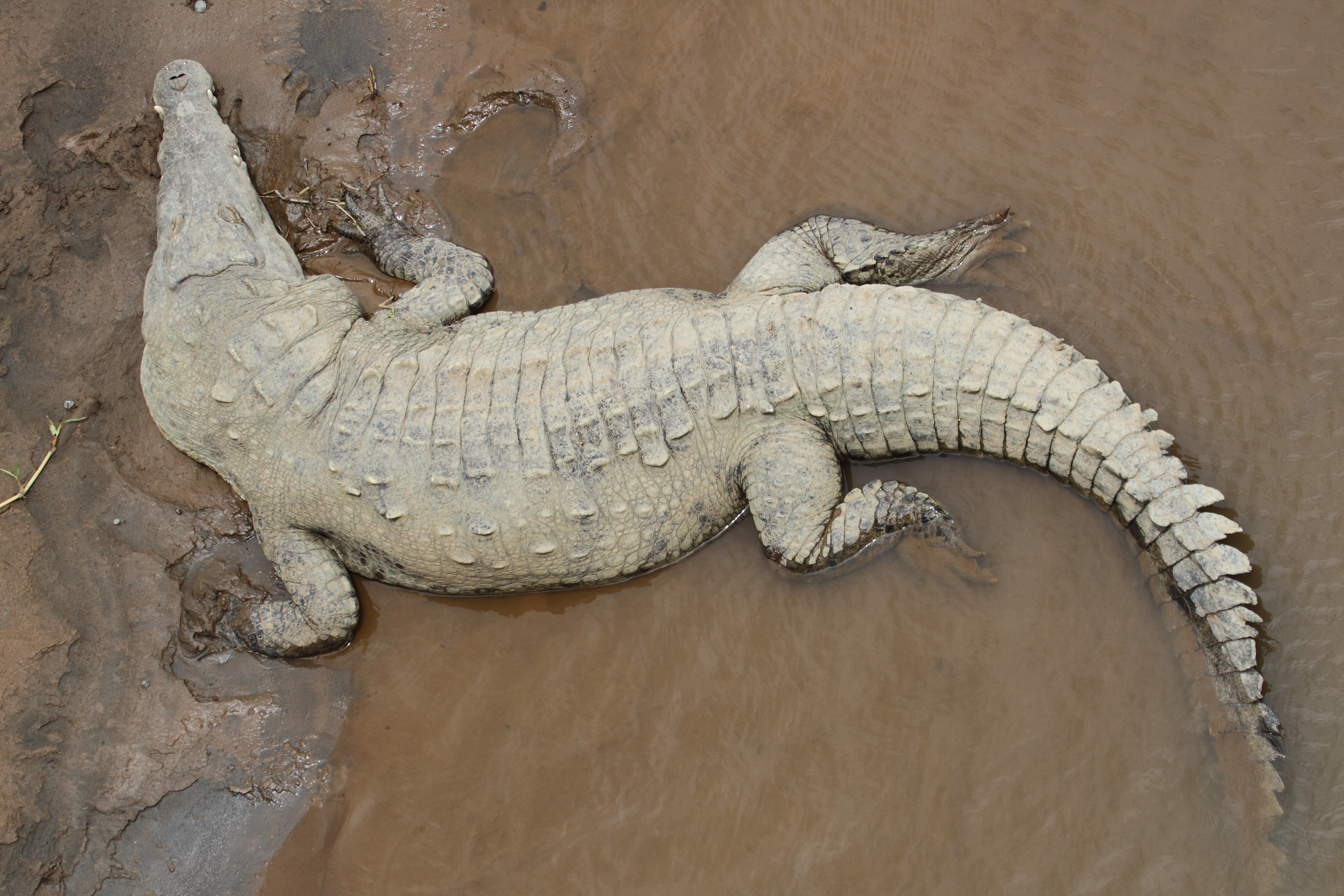
A large individual in the Tárcoles River, Costa Rica

New hatchlings are about 27 cm (10 1/2 in) in length and about 60 g (2 oz) in mass. The average adult in the continental rivers can range from 2.9 to 4 m (9 ft 6 in to 13 ft 1 in) long and weigh up to 382 kg (842 lb) in males, while females can range from 2.5 to 3 m (8 ft 2 in to 9 ft 10 in) and weigh up to 173 kg (381 lb), the lower total length representing their average size at sexual maturity, the upper representing the expected upper size limit for the respective sex in most known populations. Common weights of adult American crocodiles in Florida may range from 50 to 250 kg (110 to 550 lb) with corresponding lengths of 2.5 to 3.85 m (8 ft 2 in to 12 ft 8 in). With extensive conservation efforts underway, there appears to be an increase in the number of large American crocodiles in Florida, some of the largest reportedly exceeding 4 m (13 ft 1 in) in length. Eight adult American crocodiles from Costa Rica ranged in total length from 2.82 to 4.83 m (9 ft 3 in to 15 ft 10 in). Large adults of this species are capable of reaching 500–600 kg (1,100–1,300 lb) in weight, with individuals approaching 6 m (19 ft 8 in) exceeding 1,000 kg (2,200 lb) in weight, ranking it among the largest living crocodilians in the Neotropical realm. It is estimated that specimens of C. acutus measuring 3 m (9 ft 10 in) in TL would weigh around 100 kg (220 lb), specimens measuring 4 m (13 ft 1 in) in TL would weigh around 270 kg (600 lb), and specimens measuring 6.25 m (20 ft 6 in) in TL would weigh around 1,100 kg (2,400 lb). However, body mass can be fairly variable in mature adults. A large male specimen from Costa Rica measuring 4.83 m (15 ft 10 in) in total length weighed about 538 kg (1,186 lb). On the other hand, another specimen measuring 3.95 m (13 ft 0 in) in total length was found to have weighed 500 kg (1,100 lb)

An individual named "Papillon" was considered to be one of the largest American crocodiles in captivity. It measured 4.3 m (14 ft 1 in) in length, weighed 500 kg (1,100 lb), and was estimated to be more than 80 years old when he died. The largest recorded female measured 4.4 m (14 ft 5 in) in length and weighed 450 kg (1,000 lb). Exceptionally large specimens may arguably exceed 5 m (16 ft 5 in), possibly reaching or exceeding 6.1 m (20 ft 0 in), but such specimens are unverified and possibly dubious although some are arguably supported by size projections from skull lengths. These exceptionally large crocodiles are estimated to range between 6 and 7 m (19 ft 8 in and 23 ft 0 in) in length and weigh between 900 and 1,300 kg (2,000 and 2,900 lb), though these are mere estimations and not verified.

== Distribution and habitat ==
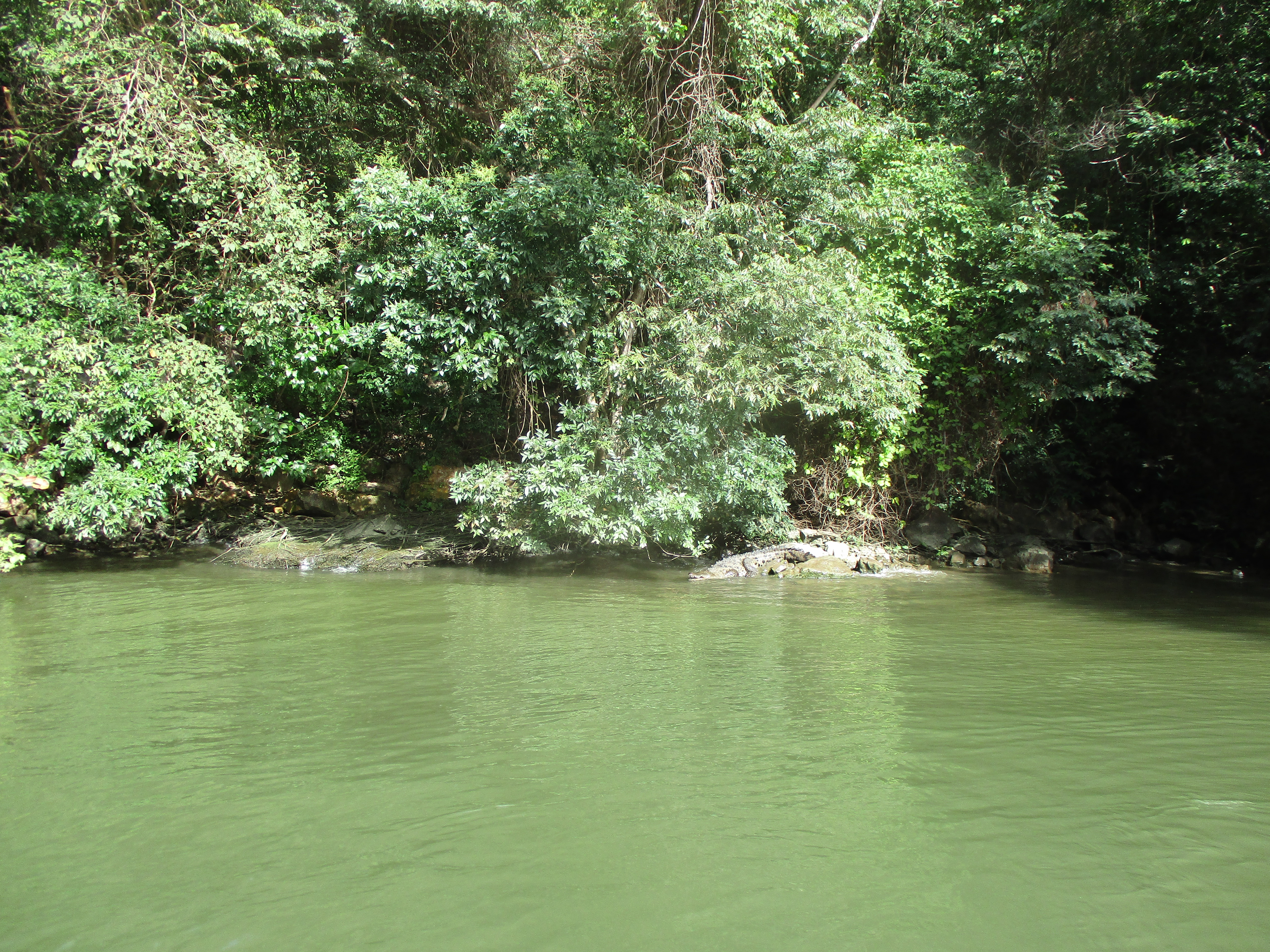
In Sumidero Canyon National Park, Chiapas, Mexico

The American crocodile is the most widespread of the four extant species of crocodiles from the Americas. They are saltwater-tolerant, and have thus been capable of colonizing a multitude of islands within the Caribbean, and on some coastal Pacific islands as well making it the most widely distributed New World crocodile. They inhabit waters such as mangrove swamps, river mouths, fresh waters, and salt lakes, and can even be found at sea, hence their wide distribution throughout southern Florida, the Greater Antilles (excluding Puerto Rico and Isla de la Juventud, where they are replaced by the introduced spectacled caiman), Martinique, southern Mexico (including the Yucatán Peninsula), Central America, and the South American countries of Colombia, Peru, Venezuela (including on Margarita Island), and Ecuador. The American crocodile is especially plentiful in Costa Rica.

American crocodiles coexist with the American alligator in Florida and the spectacled caiman within Central America. The only other crocodiles present within the American crocodile's range are the Morelet's crocodile, and the critically endangered Cuban and Orinoco crocodiles. Recent morphological and genetic analyses have demonstrated hybridization with Cuban crocodiles among American crocodiles of the Yucatán.

=== Caribbean ===
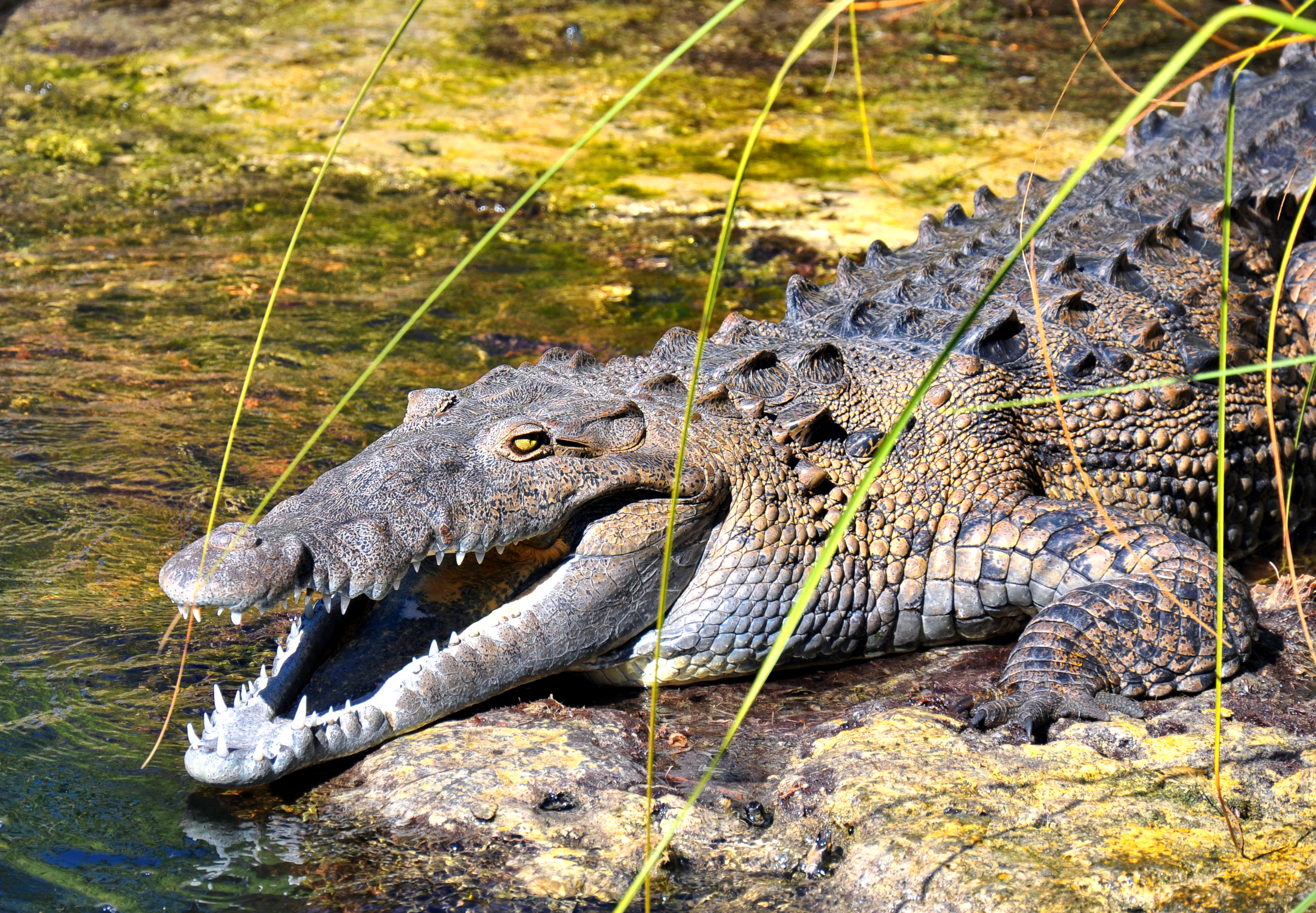
In Jamaica's Black River

One of its largest documented populations (the largest in the Caribbean) is in Lago Enriquillo, a hypersaline lake in the Dominican Republic. In Haiti, the only population known is in the brackish lake Etang Saumâtre, where the population is nearing extirpation due to overhunting and poaching (there is also a possible population that lives in l'Ester-Artibonite mangroves). In Jamaica, the species inhabits most of the swamps available, as well as brackish portions of rivers. American crocodiles have recently been sighted in Grand Cayman, leading experts to believe the species may be swimming from Cuba (which is home to a large American crocodile population) and slowly repopulating Grand Cayman. There have been reports of American crocodiles in Trinidad, however, those sightings are thought to have arisen due to the accidental translocation of the animal outside of its normal range. The species is thus not considered indigenous to Trinidad. Due to changing climate, which increases the frequency of hurricanes and cyclones in the Caribbean, American Crocodiles are reported to have decreased body condition. This is most likely due to the changes on the areas salinity, temperature and prey availability which could impede the recovery of these populations.

=== Florida ===
The American crocodile's saline tolerance may have allowed it to inhabit limited portions of the United States, particularly southern Florida. Contrary to popular misinformation, the presence of the American alligator is not the reason the American crocodile was unable to populate brackish waters north of Florida, but rather the climate, as crocodiles are less tolerant of cold. Within the United States, the American crocodile's distribution is generally limited to the southern tip of Florida, though at least two have been found as far north as the Tampa Bay area. They are primarily found south of the latitude of Miami, in Everglades National Park, Florida Bay, Biscayne Bay, Dry Tortugas National Park and the Florida Keys. A sizable population occurs near Homestead, at the Turkey Point Nuclear Generating Station. Some individuals have been sighted in Palm Beach, Brevard, Pinellas and Sarasota counties. Their range in Florida is the only place in the world where alligators and crocodiles coexist.

The current US population, estimated at 2,000 and growing, is a sign of return to the northernmost portion of their range. There were suspicions as early as 1829 by Rafinesque that there were more than just alligators in the state, but confirmation could not be acquired until 1869, when a specimen could be brought back for examination. Records show they were plentiful in areas like Key Largo, Miami Beach, and wherever there were the appropriate mangroves for nesting and foraging. However, at the end of the 19th century, hunting them for their leather became a cottage industry in South Florida, and beginning in 1910, habitat destruction commenced on a massive scale, with the construction of a railroad designed to connect the mainland with the Keys. Crocodile hunters, who migrated to the upper Florida Keys before and after the railroad's construction, slaughtered almost every crocodile in northeast Florida Bay for the commercial market. The widespread hunting did not cease until the 1970s: at one point in that decade, there were fewer than thirty total nests counted. As of 2020, further population seems to be expanding south to reclaim former habitat in the Florida Keys, where numbers are multiplying quickly, and old records indicate they once inhabited mangroves as far north as Tampa Bay.

== Biology and behavior ==
This crocodile species normally crawls on its belly, but it can also "high walk". Larger specimens can charge up to nearly 16 km/h (10 mph). They can swim as fast as 32 km/h (20 mph) by moving their bodies and tails in a sinuous fashion, but they cannot sustain this speed.

American crocodiles are more susceptible to cold weather than American alligators. American crocodiles do not have social groups, but occasionally they congregate for feeding and basking in the daytime. While basking, they will leave their mouths wide open that exposes blood vessels in the mouth to cooler and warmer air, which helps regulate body temperature. While an American alligator can survive in water temperatures of 7.2 °C (45.0 °F) and below for some time, an American crocodile in that environment would lose consciousness and drown due to hypothermia. American crocodiles have a faster growth rate than alligators, and are much more tolerant of saltwater. However, American crocodiles studied in northeast Florida Bay exposed to hypersaline conditions saltier than seawater were found to have reduced survival rates, growth rates, and body conditions.

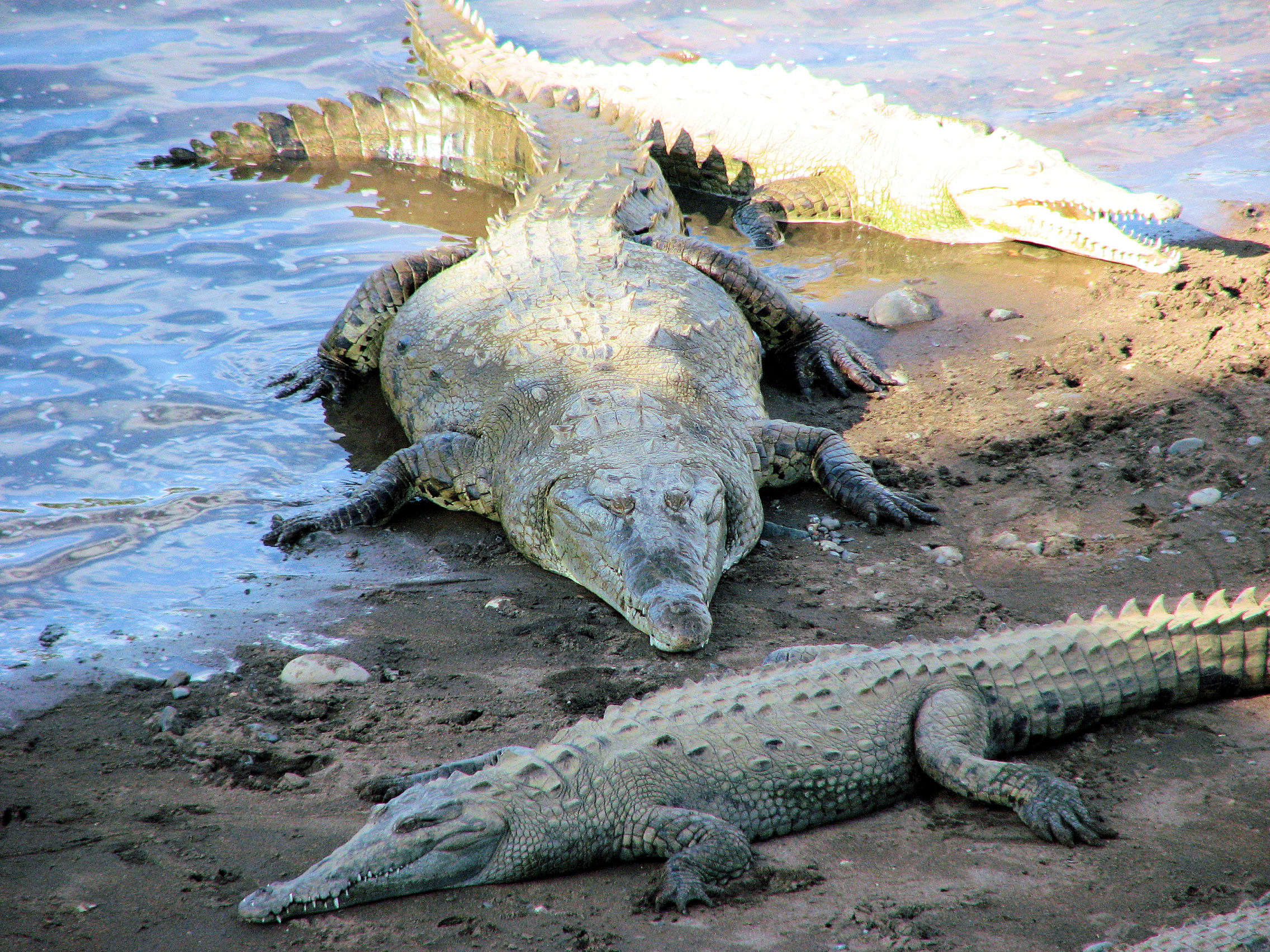
In Costa Rica

Unlike other crocodiles, the American crocodile uses acoustic signals to communicate. Crocodile communication is centered on short-distance communications during courtship and hatching.

Cleaning symbiosis involving fish and the American crocodile has been described. Due to the species preferring to live in saline environments these scutes can often house epibionts such as ticks, leeches, barnacles, and even sea anemones.

=== Hunting and diet ===
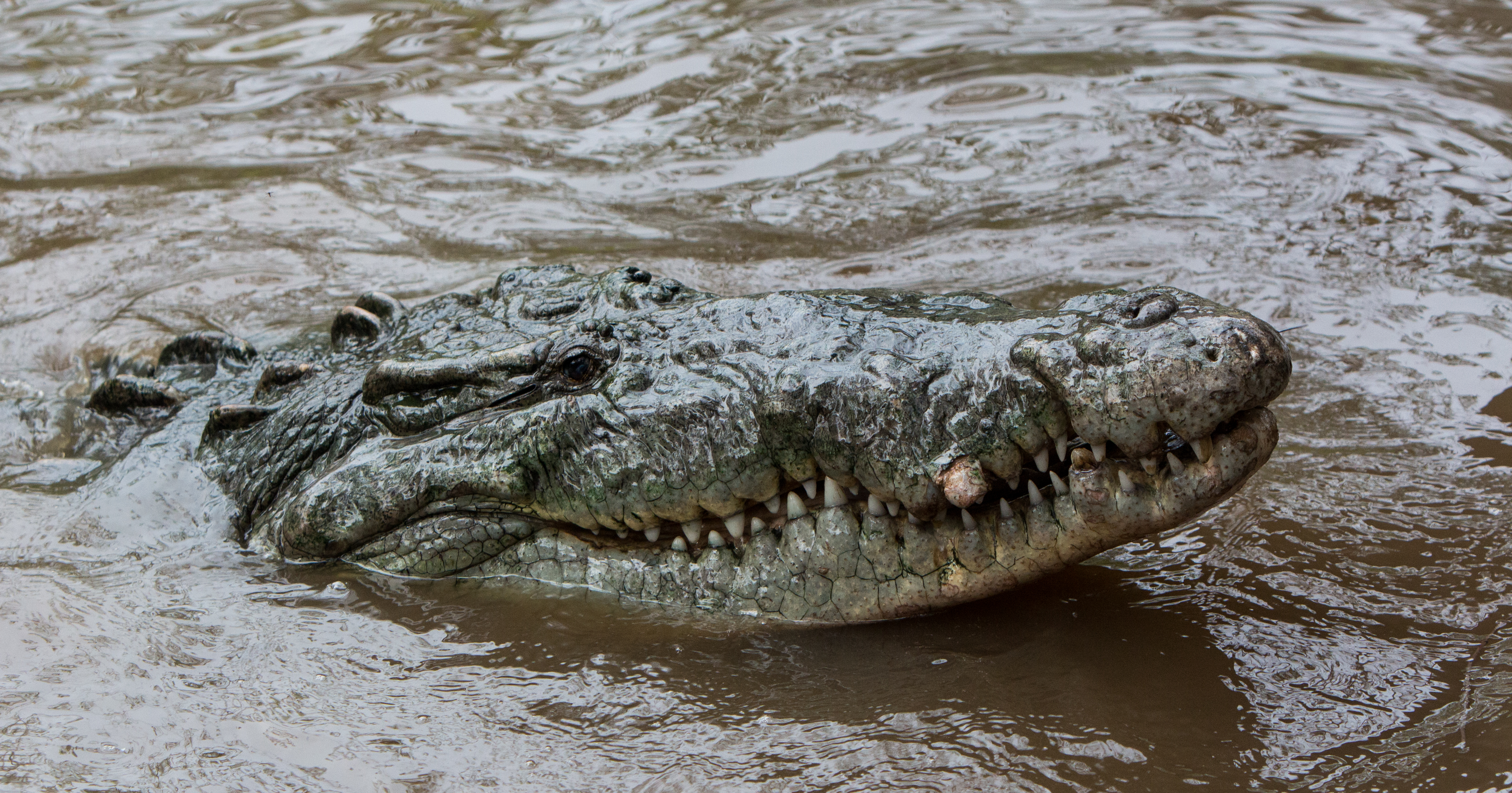
Adult male

American crocodiles are apex predators, and any aquatic or terrestrial animal they encounter in freshwater, riparian and coastal saltwater habitats is potential prey.

The snout of the American crocodile is broader than some specialized fish-eating crocodilians (e.g., gharials and freshwater crocodiles), allowing it to supplement its diet with a wider variety of prey. In addition the snout gets even broader and bulkier as the animal matures, a sign for a shift in prey items. Prey species have ranged in size from the insects taken by young American crocodiles to full-grown cattle taken by large adults, and can include various birds, mammals, turtles, snakes, lizards, smaller crocodilians, echinoderms, insects, arachnids, crabs, other crustaceans, snails, other molluscs, frogs, fish, and occasionally carrion and fruits. In Haiti, hatchling and juvenile American crocodiles lived primarily off of fiddler crabs (Uca ssp.), making up 33.8% and 62.3% of the diet by weight, respectively. Elsewhere, aquatic insects and their larvae and snails are near the top of the food list for American crocodiles at this very early age. Immature and subadult American crocodiles, per a study in Mexico, have a more diverse diet that can include insects, fish, frogs, small turtles, birds and small mammals. One specimen of 1.2 m (3 ft 11 in) had a catfish, a mourning dove and a bare-tailed woolly opossum in its stomach.

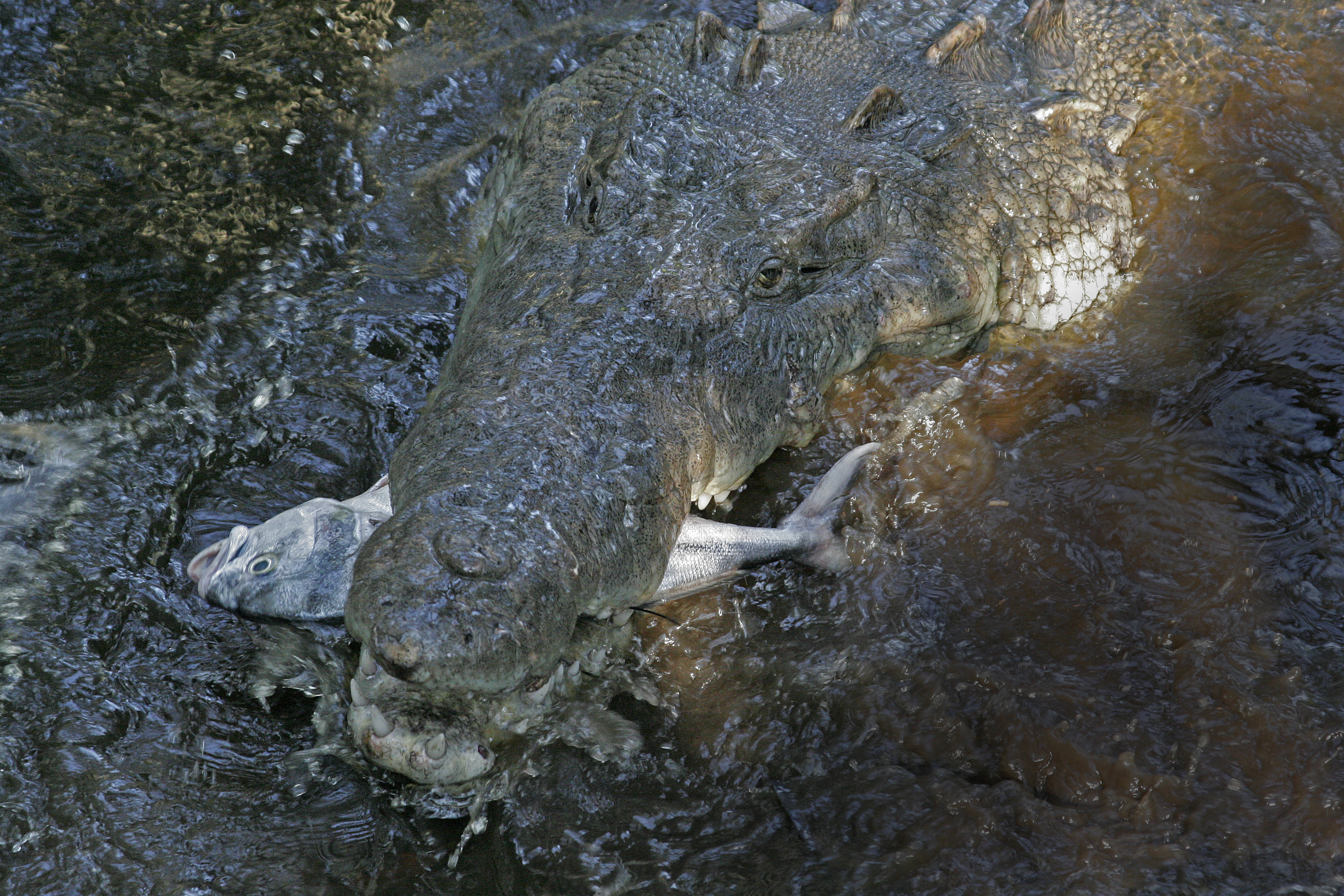
Eating a roosterfish, in La Manzanilla, Mexico

In Florida, bass, tarpon and especially mullet, large crabs, snakes, mammals that habit the riparian and coastal regions of the Everglades, such as opossums and raccoons appeared to be the primary prey of American crocodiles. In Southern Florida, it was found that American crocodiles rely on marine food sources 65% of the time and rely on water gleaned from marine food 80% of the time. In Haiti, adults appeared to live largely off of various birds, including herons, storks, flamingos, pelicans, grebes, coots and moorhens, followed by concentrations of fish including Tilapia and Cichlasoma, at times being seen to capture turtles, dogs and goats. One 3 m (9 ft 10 in) adult from Honduras had stomach contents consisting of a 1.5 m (4 ft 11 in) crocodile of its own species, a turtle shell and peccary hooves. In Quintana Roo, Mexico, most prey that could be determined was fish for sub-adults and adults with sub-adults having a broader prey base than either younger or adult American crocodiles. In Costa Rica, American crocodiles have been recorded hunting and killing adult female olive ridley sea turtles (Lepidochelys olivacea) when they come to nest around beaches. Reportedly, these American crocodiles hunt primarily in the first few hours after nightfall, especially on moonless nights, although they will feed at any time. It hunts in the typical way for most crocodilians, ambushing terrestrial prey when it comes to edge of the water or is sitting in shallows and dragging it down to be drowned or attempting to ambush aquatic prey from near the surface of the water.

It was noted that historically in Mexico that, among several local farmers, the capturing of livestock by American crocodiles has been a source of some conflict between humans and American crocodiles and large adults occasionally can become habitual predators of goats, dogs, pigs and cattle.

==== Interspecies predatory relations ====
Adult American crocodiles are apex predators; they have no natural predators. They are known predators of lemon sharks, and sharks avoid areas with American crocodiles.

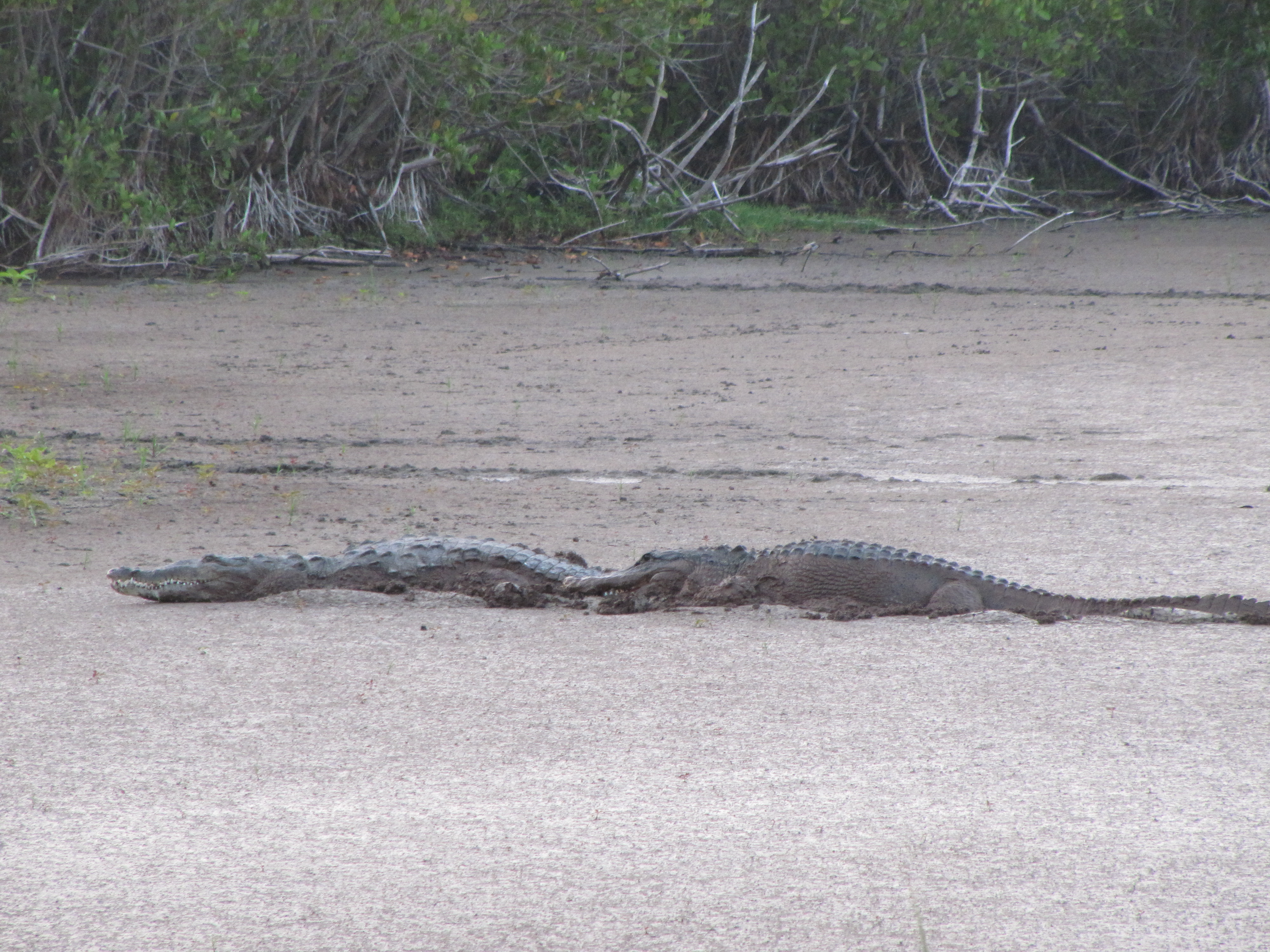
American crocodile (left) and an American alligator (right) at a dry sand pond in the Everglades, Florida.

Usually, American alligators are dominant over and more behaviorally aggressive than American crocodiles. However, on one occasion, an American crocodile in a Florida zoo escaped its cage and started a fight with a large male American alligator in a bordering pen, and was killed. Conversely, there is one confirmed case of an American crocodile preying on a sub-adult American alligator in the wild in Florida. American alligators and American crocodiles do not often come into conflict in the wild, due largely to habitat partitioning and largely separate distributions.

There are several records of American crocodiles killing and eating spectacled caimans in South America. Areas with healthy American crocodile populations often hold only limited numbers of spectacled caimans, while conversely areas that formerly held American crocodiles but where they are now heavily depleted or are locally extinct show a growth of caiman numbers, due to less competition as well as predation. In areas of Cuba where the two species coexist, the smaller but more aggressive Cuban crocodile is behaviorally dominant over the larger American crocodile. In Mexico, some Morelet's crocodile individuals have escaped from captivity, establishing feral populations and creating a problem for the populations of American crocodile, which must compete with this invasive species.

=== Reproduction ===
The American crocodile is a highly fecund species. Average clutch size is 38 eggs, and fecundity is over 20% after 15 years old. The species has a high adult survival rate and a long life span.

American crocodiles breed in late fall or early winter, engaging in drawn-out mating ceremonies in which males emit low-frequency bellows to attract females. Body size is more important than age in determining reproductive capabilities, and females reach sexual maturity at a length of about 2.8 m (9 ft 2 in). In February or March, gravid females will begin to create nests of sand, mud, and dead vegetation along the water's edge. Mounds are often built in areas such as well-drained beaches and abandoned canal levees. Nest location is crucial, and with the correct amount of vegetation, the eggs will develop within a small temperature range. Because sex determination is temperature-dependent in crocodilians, slight aberrations in temperature may result in all-male or all-female clutches, which would possibly harm the health of the population. About one month later, when it is time to lay, the female will dig a wide hole diagonally into the side of the nest and lay 30 to 70 eggs in it, depending on her size. Females will maintain and reuse these holes for many years. After laying, the female may cover the eggs with debris or leave them uncovered. The white, elongated eggs are 8 cm (3 in) long and 5 cm (2 in) wide, with a number of pores in the brittle shell.

During the 75- to 80-day incubation period, the parents will guard the nest, often inhabiting a hole in the bank nearby. Females especially have been known to guard their nests with ferocity. But in spite of these precautions, American crocodile eggs sometimes fall prey to raccoons in Florida, Belize and Costa Rica (arguably the most virulent natural predator of crocodilian nests in the Americas), white-nosed coatis in Costa Rica, skunks (Conepatus, Mephitis and Spilogale spp.) in Mexico or other scavenging mammals (including coyotes in Mexico and American black bears in southern Florida), as well as red imported fire ants in Florida, crabs (Atlantic blue crabs in Florida and great land crabs in Mexico) and vultures (turkey vultures in Florida and black vultures in Panama). In Panama, green iguanas were seen to dig up and prey on American crocodile eggs occasionally, although in several cases were caught by the mother American crocodile and eaten. Crocodilian eggs are somewhat brittle, but softer than bird eggs. Despite noticeable nest guarding during egg incubation, guarding of young after hatching seems to be minimal in this species.

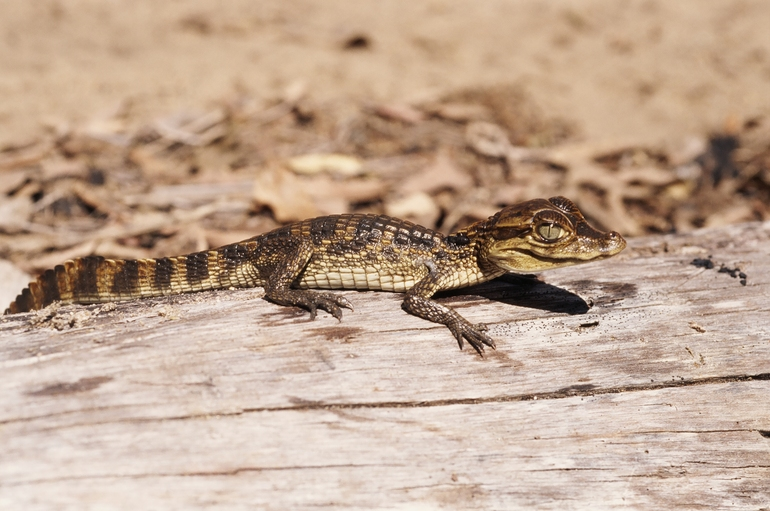
Hatchling in Colombia

This species exists mostly in tropical areas with distinct rainy seasons, and the young hatch near the time of the first rains of the summer (July–August) after the preceding dry season, and before the bodies of water where they live flood. In this stage of development of their young, mother American crocodiles exhibit a unique mode of parental care. During the hatching process, when the young American crocodiles are most vulnerable to predation, they will instinctively call out in soft, grunt-like croaks. These sounds trigger the female to attend to the nest, uncovering the eggs if they have been covered. Then she will aid the hatchlings in escaping their eggs and scoop them up with her mouth, carrying them to the closest water source.

The hatchlings, which are 24 to 27 cm (9 1/2 to 10 1/2 in) in length, have been reported to actively hunt prey within a few days of hatching. It is not uncommon for the mother to care for her young even weeks after they have hatched, remaining attentive to their calls and continuing to provide transportation. About five weeks after hatching, the young American crocodiles disband in search of their own independent lives. On average only 16% of hatchlings will make it to adulthood, with most falling prey to several types of raptorial birds, other reptiles, and large fishes (e.g., roadside hawks in Mexico, laughing falcons in Mexico, tropical gars in Nicaragua, barred catfish in Colombia, Atlantic tarpons in Florida, common snook in Florida, lemon sharks in Florida, Central American boas in Belize, black spiny-tailed iguanas in Costa Rica, and spectacled caimans in Venezuela). Those that do survive grow rapidly, feeding on insects, fish and frogs. Additionally, some young American crocodiles feed on each other.

==== Facultative parthenogenesis ====
Facultative parthenogenesis has been shown to occur in C. acutus based on data from whole genome sequencing. The evidence supports a particular mechanism of parthenogenesis, terminal fusion automixis during meiosis.

== Conservation status ==
The International Union for Conservation of Nature (IUCN) lists the species as vulnerable. On March 20, 2007, the United States Fish and Wildlife Service declassified the American crocodile as an endangered species, changing its status to "threatened". It remains protected from poaching and killing under the federal Endangered Species Act. NatureServe considers the Florida population "Imperiled".

Because of hide hunting, pollution, loss of habitat, and commercial farming, the American crocodile is endangered in parts of its range. Within habitats across Florida and Biscayne Bays, the construction of canal networks has also impacted American crocodiles by reducing freshwater flow and thus increasing the duration and frequency of hypersalinity events. As a result of overhunting in the 1950s and 1960s, Venezuela banned commercial crocodile skin harvesting for a decade starting in 1972. In southern Florida, about two-thirds of American crocodile deaths are attributed to road collisions, about 10% to intentional killing, and only about 5% to natural causes. In recent years in Jamaica there has been rampant poaching of the species for their meat and there has been a significant population drop compounded by the lack of action by the government. On Hispaniola, they were once found throughout the island, but currently, the only confirmed remaining presence is at the two largest lakes on the island: Etang Saumâtre in Haiti, and Lago Enriquillo in the Dominican Republic.

An estimated 1,000 to 2,000 American crocodiles live in Mexico, Central America and South America, but population data is limited. An additional 500 to 1,200 are believed to live in southern Florida. It is estimated that the population of mature individuals as of 2020 is around 5,000.

== Relationship with humans ==
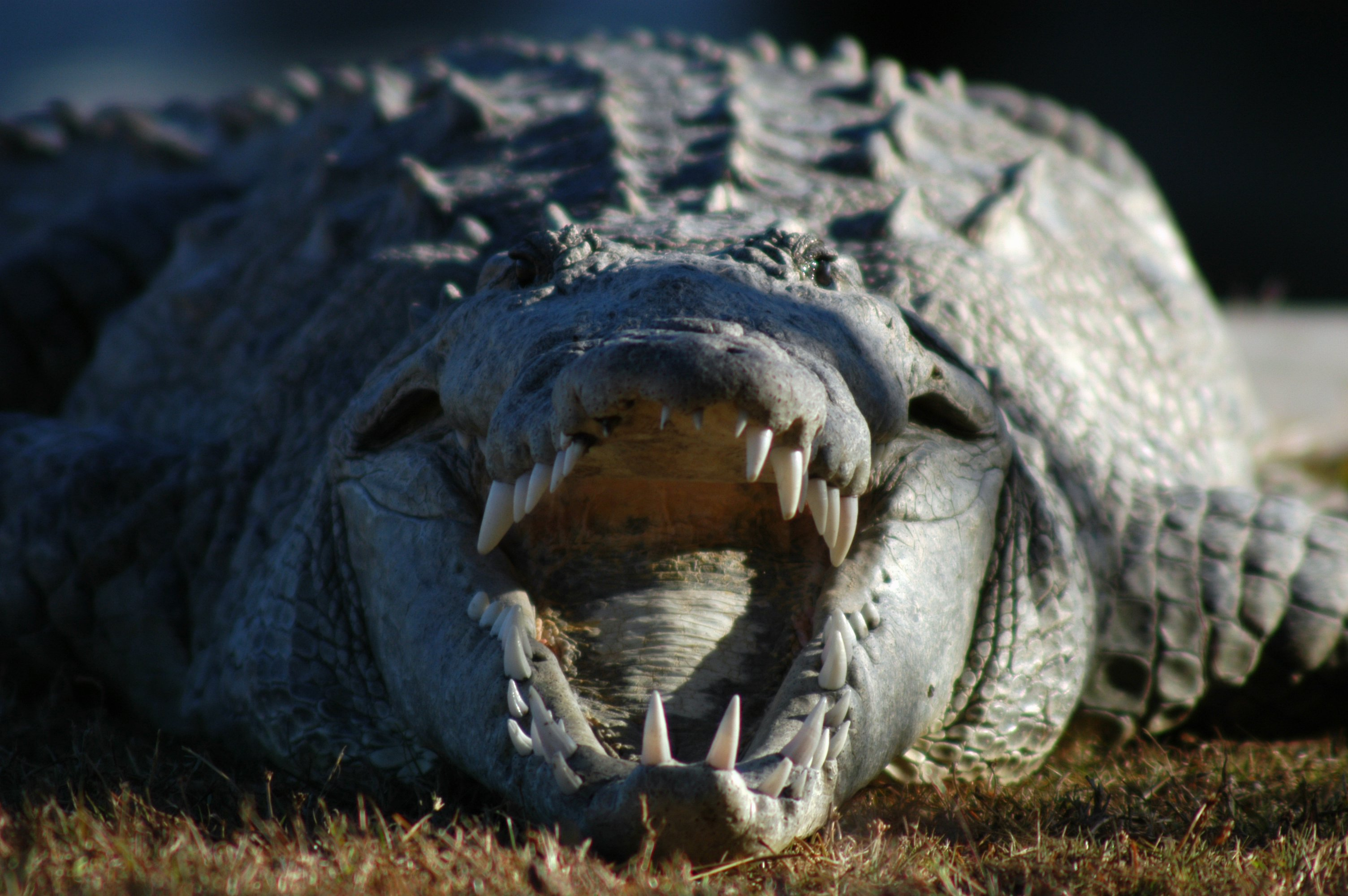
In Everglades National Park

Attacks by American crocodiles have been reported in Mexico, Costa Rica, and Panama. The American crocodile rates somewhere in the middle of all crocodilians temperamentally. A study by the IUCN found that it has the highest incidence of reported attacks on humans of any of the crocodilians from the Americas, but fatalities were rare. The species usually does not attack people as regularly as Old World crocodiles do; the estimated number of attacks is considerably smaller than those by the saltwater (C. porosus) and Nile crocodiles (C. niloticus), which are considered the most aggressive crocodilians towards humans. Particular to this species, it is noted for having a shy demeanor and clearly does not want anything to do with humans; it will not stand its ground and will flee humans at the very sight of them. The Cuban crocodile (C. rhombifer) is rather more aggressive in interspecies interactions than the American crocodile and attacks and displaces American crocodiles when they are kept in mixed species enclosures at zoos or at crocodile farms together, despite being smaller than the American species. However, attacks on humans are rarely reported in Cuban crocodiles, due to its much more limited habitat and range.

In May 2007, two instances occurred within one week of children being attacked and killed by American crocodiles—one in Mexico just south of Puerto Vallarta and one in Costa Rica. On August 24, 2014, a man and a woman were swimming in a canal in Gables by the Sea, a community in Coral Gables, Florida, at 02:00, a canal where crocodiles were known to occur, when they were bitten in the shoulder and the hand by an American crocodile. Although the crocodile was 3.68 m (12 ft 1 in) in length, and weighed an estimated 250 kilograms (550 lb), it did not press the attack, but released and moved away from its victims. (Florida Fish & Wildlife Conservation Commission, Crocodile Response Program) This was the first documented wild crocodile attack on humans in Florida since records of human-crocodile conflict have been kept. There have reportedly been 36 American crocodile attacks on humans from 1995 to 2017 in the Cancun area of southeastern Mexico.

== Gallery ==
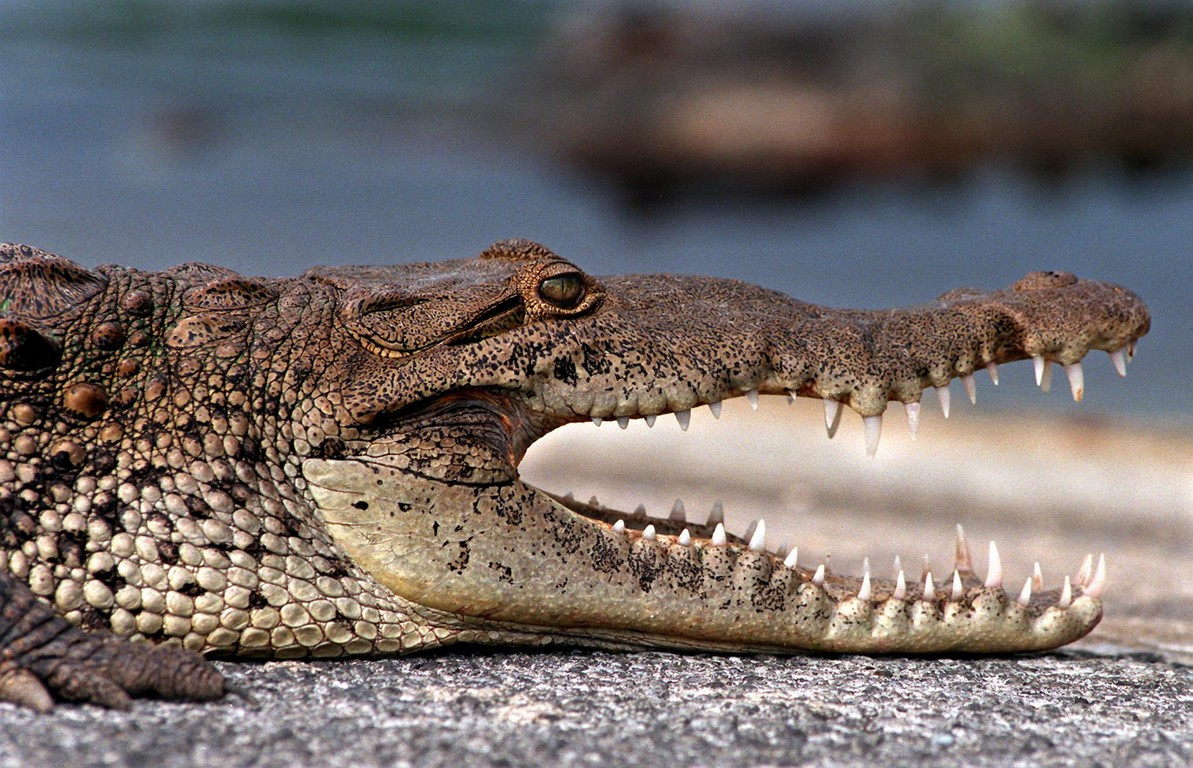

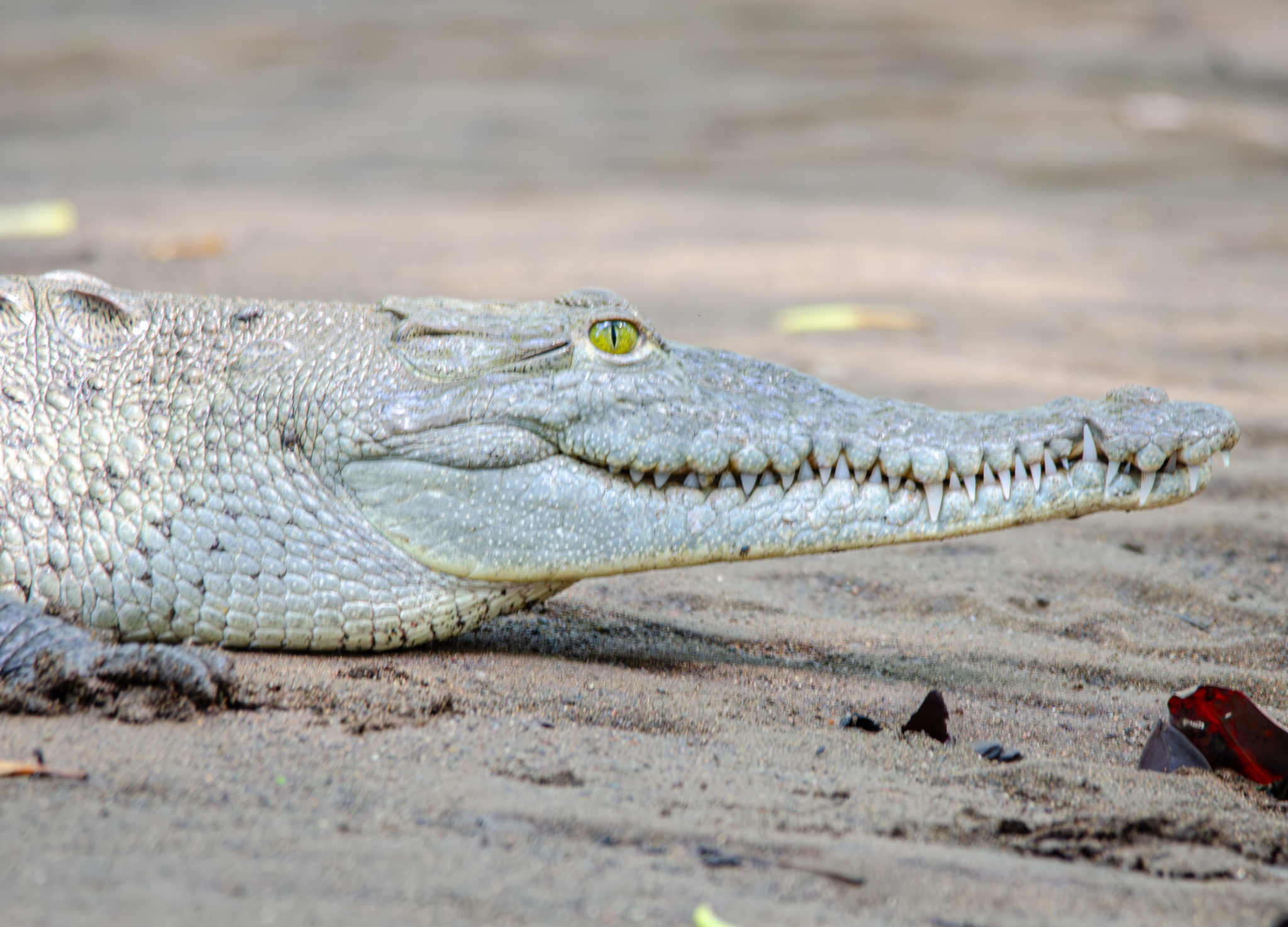
In Costa Rica

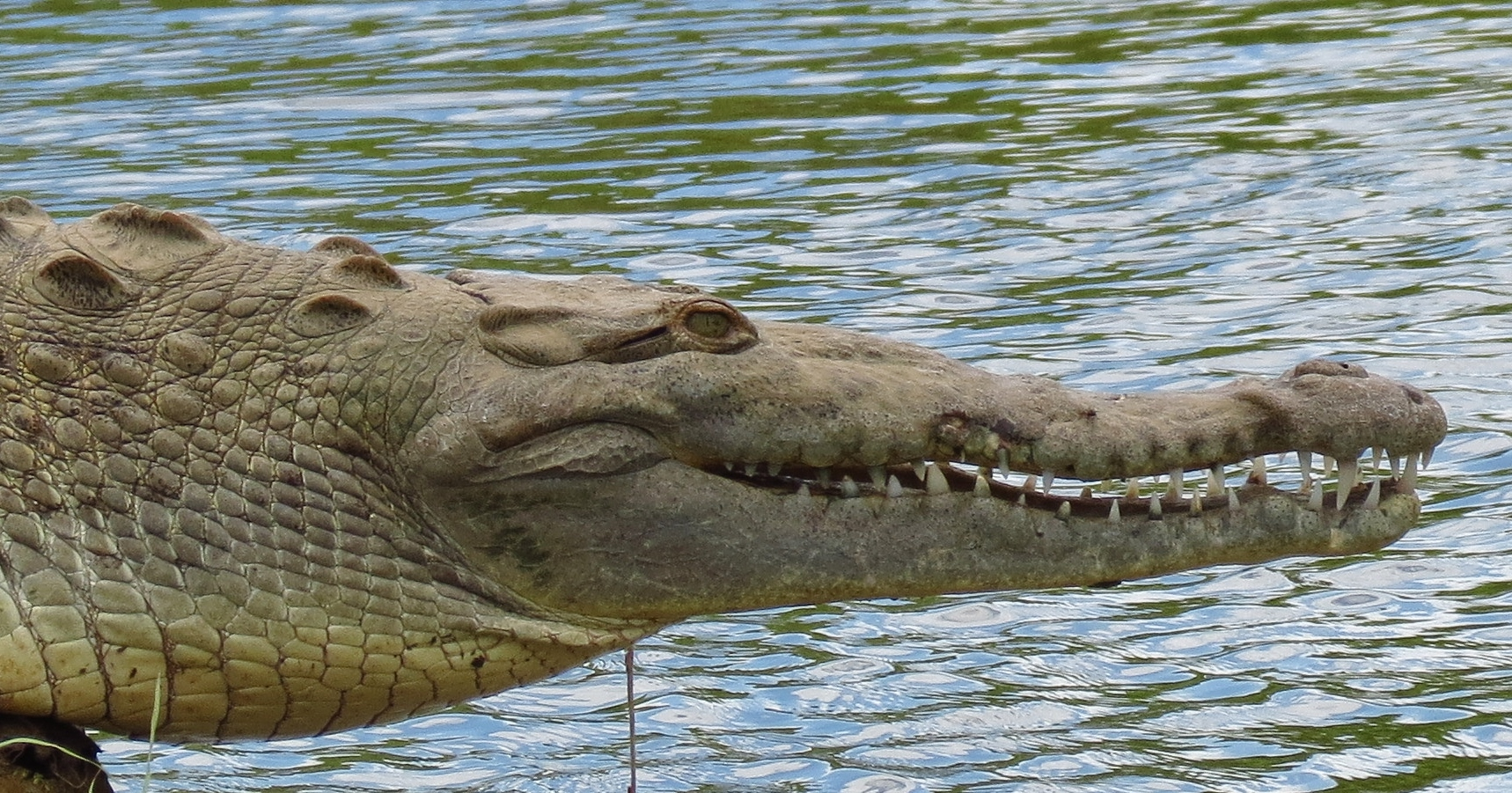
In Costa Rica

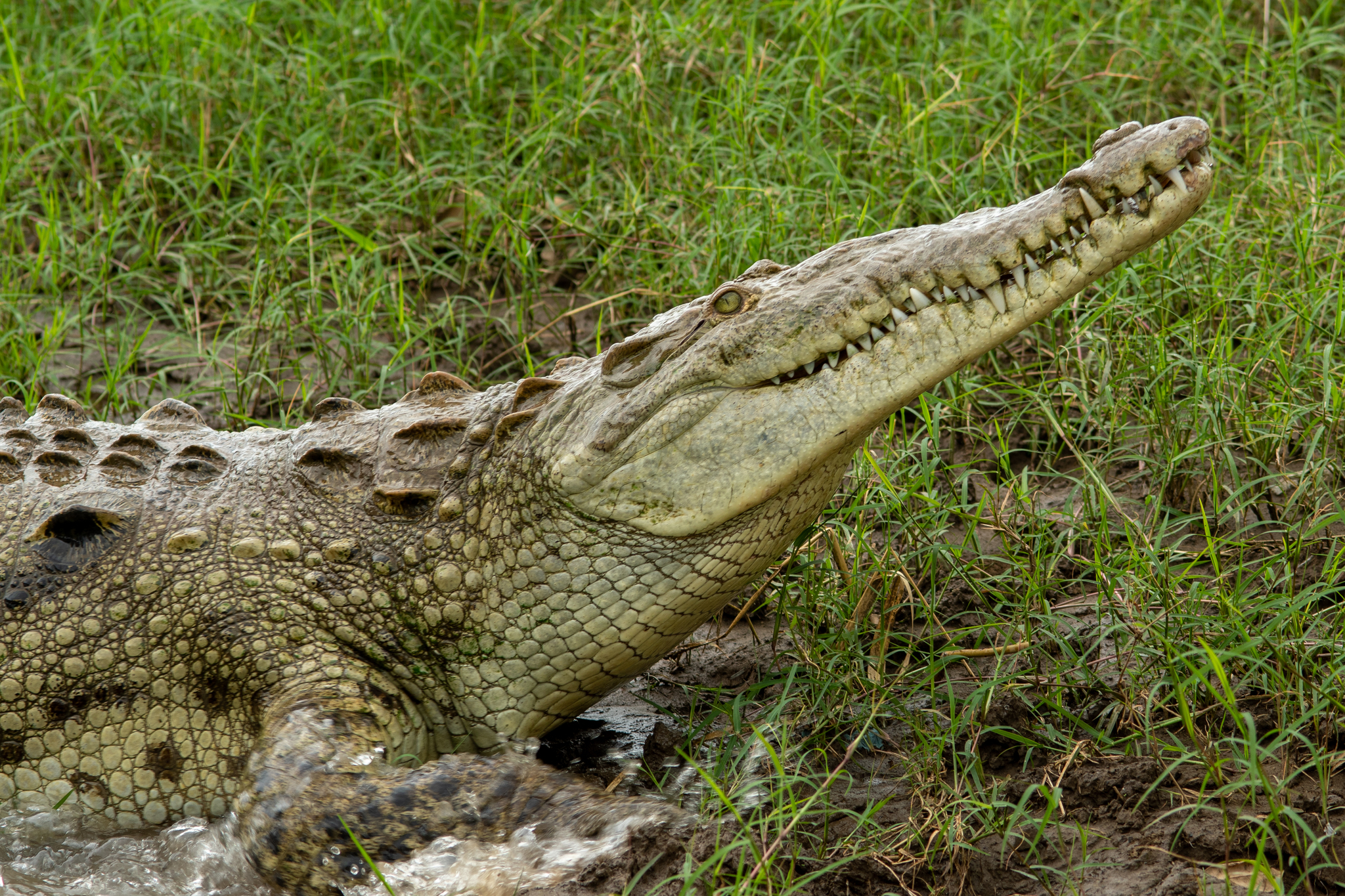
In Costa Rica

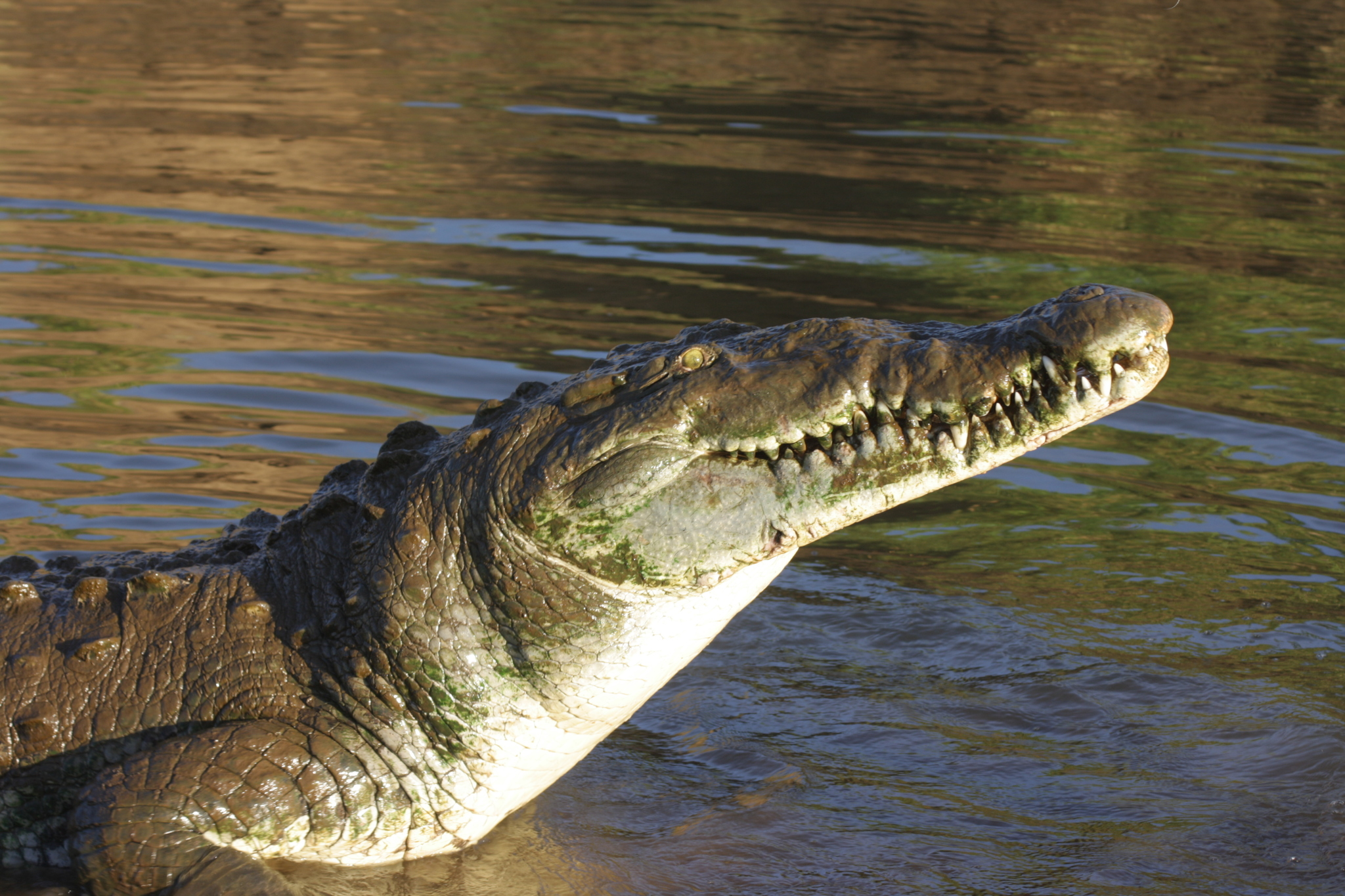
In Costa Rica

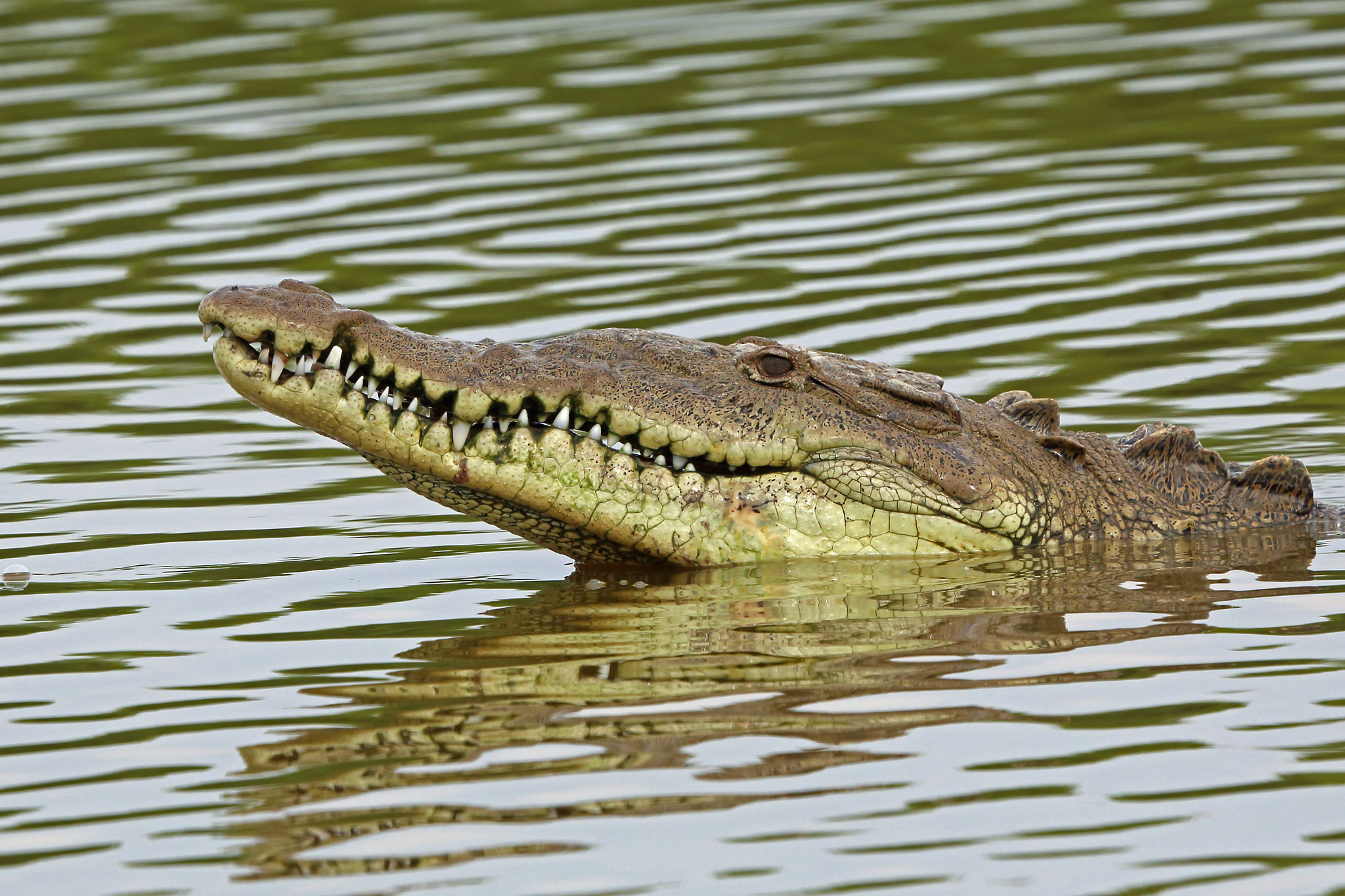
In Mexico

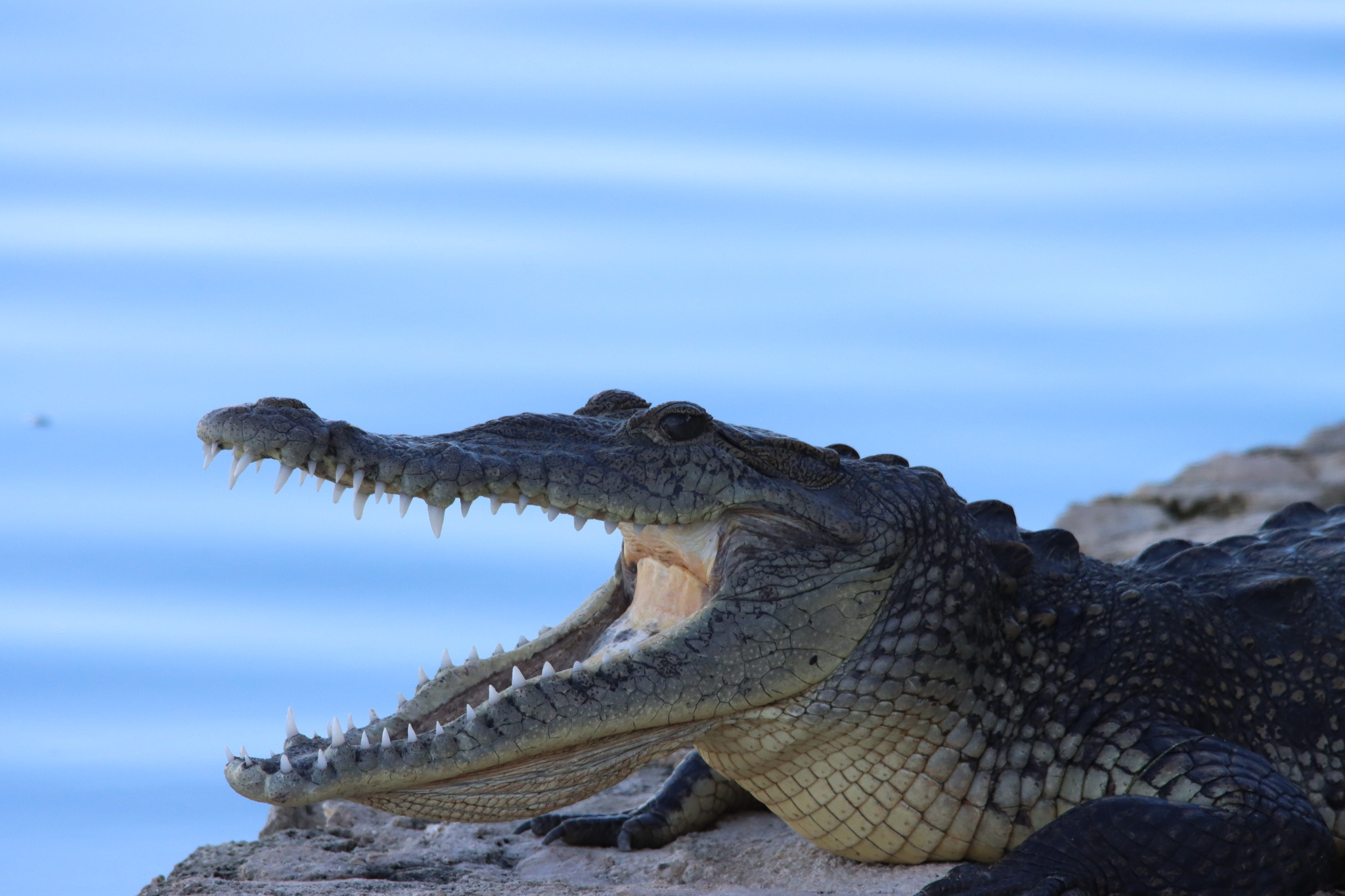
In Mexico
