= 95th meridian east =

Line of longitude

95th meridian east

The meridian 95° east of Greenwich is a line of longitude that extends from the North Pole across the Arctic Ocean, Asia, the Indian Ocean, the Southern Ocean, and Antarctica to the South Pole.

The 95th meridian east forms a great circle with the 85th meridian west.

== From Pole to Pole ==
Starting at the North Pole and heading south to the South Pole, the 95th meridian east passes through:

Co-ordinates	Country, territory or sea	Notes
90°0′N 95°0′E	Arctic Ocean	
81°8′N 95°0′E	Russia	Komsomolets Island, Severnaya Zemlya, Krasnoyarsk Krai
80°0′N 95°0′E	Red Army Strait	
80°6′N 95°0′E	Russia	Cape October — October Revolution Island, Severnaya Zemlya, Krasnoyarsk Krai
79°2′N 95°0′E	Kara Sea	
76°40′N 95°0′E	Russia	Nordenskiöld Archipelago and Taymyr Peninsula, Krasnoyarsk Krai; Tuva Republic — from 53°22′N 95°0′E
50°3′N 95°0′E	Mongolia	
44°15′N 95°0′E	People's Republic of China	Xinjiang; Gansu — from 41°45′N 95°0′E; Qinghai — from 38°25′N 95°0′E; Tibet — from 32°19′N 95°0′E
29°8′N 95°0′E	India	Arunachal Pradesh — partly claimed by People's Republic of China; Assam — from 27°46′N 95°0′E; Nagaland — from 26°55′N 95°0′E
25°43′N 95°0′E	Myanmar (Burma)	
15°47′N 95°0′E	Indian Ocean	Passing just west of the islands of Breueh and Sumatra, Indonesia
60°0′S 95°0′E	Southern Ocean	
66°14′S 95°0′E	Antarctica	Australian Antarctic Territory, claimed by Australia

Next westward: 94th meridian east	95th meridian east forms a great circle with 85th meridian west	Next eastward: 96th meridian east
