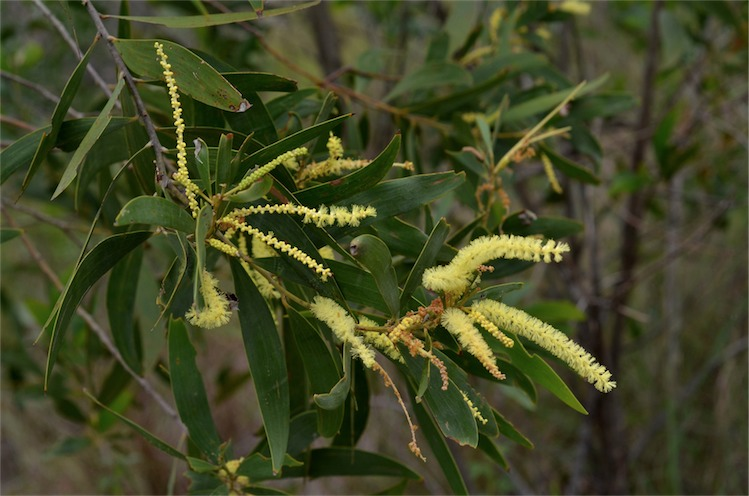
- In Burrum Coast National Park

Scientific classification
- Kingdom: Plantae
- Clade: Embryophytes
- Clade: Tracheophytes
- Clade: Spermatophytes
- Clade: Angiosperms
- Clade: Eudicots
- Clade: Rosids
- Order: Fabales
- Family: Fabaceae
- Subfamily: Caesalpinioideae
- Clade: Mimosoid clade
- Genus: Acacia
- Species: A. leptocarpa

Binomial name
- Acacia leptocarpa A.Cunn. ex Benth.
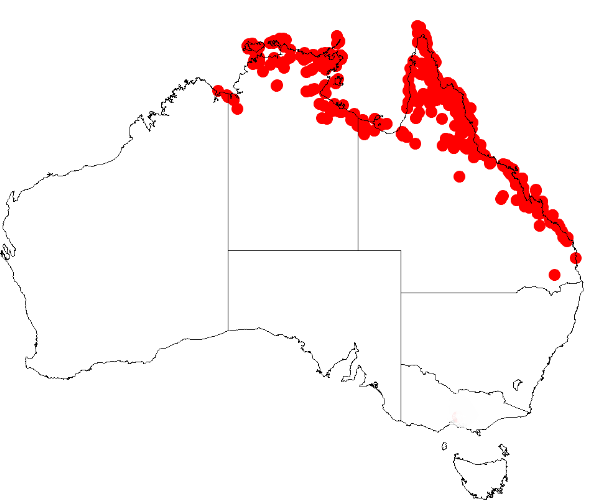
- Occurrence data from AVH

Synonyms
- Acacia polystachya A.Cunn. ex Benth. p.p.; Racosperma leptocarpum (Benth.) Pedley

= Acacia leptocarpa =

Slender-fruited wattle

Species of legume

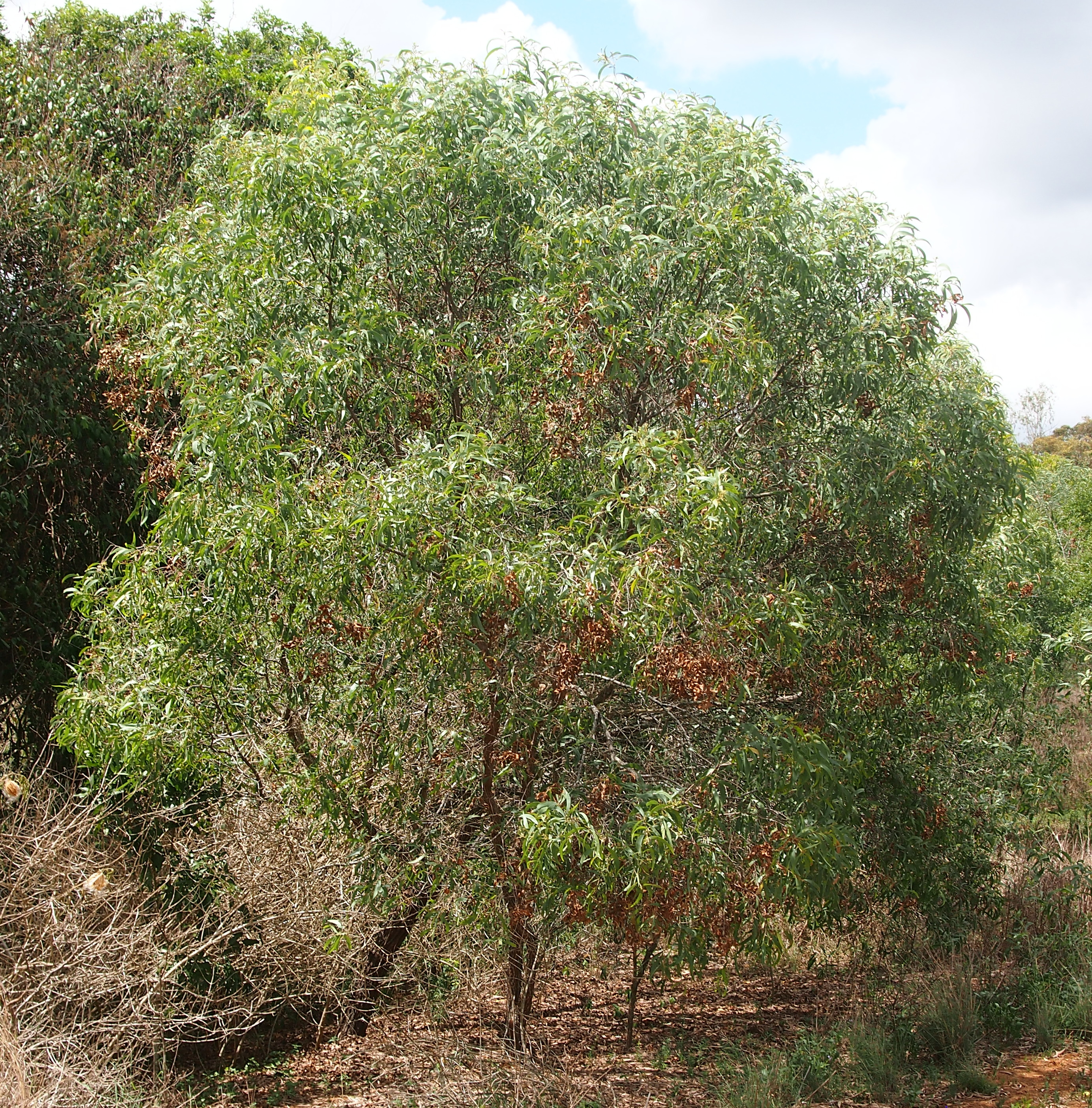
Habit

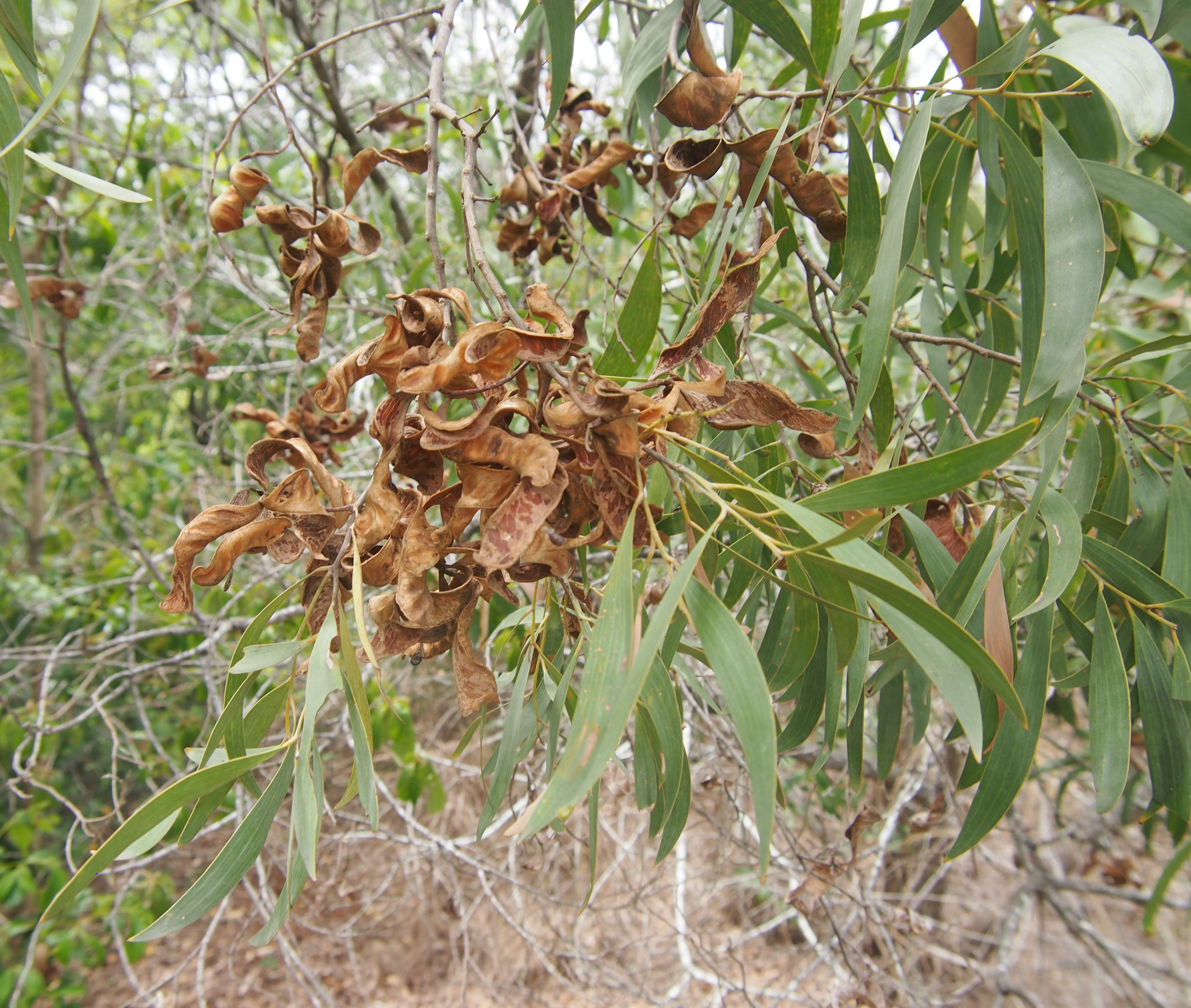
Foliage and seed pods

Acacia leptocarpa, commonly known as slender-fruited wattle, mangarr mangal, malakmalak, matngala or wagiman in Australian Aboriginal languages, is a species of flowering plant in the family Fabaceae and is endemic to northern Australia. It is a tree, rarely a shrub, with dark grey to almost black bark, narrowly elliptic, sickle-shaped, shortened phyllodes, spikes heads of yellow to golden yellow flowers and curved, curled or twisted pods constricted between and raised over the seeds.

== Description ==
Acacia leptocarpa is a tree that typically grows to a height of up to 15 m (49 ft), rarely a shrub to 4 m (13 ft), and has dark grey to almost black, 'ironbark' type bark and glabrous branchlets with lenticels. The phyllodes are narrowly elliptic, markedly sickle-shaped, shortened at both ends, mostly 110–200 mm (4.3–7.9 in) long and 10–35 mm (0.39–1.38 in) wide, thinly leathery with three prominent veins and a conspicuous gland near the base of the phyllode. The flowers are yellow to golden yellow and borne in spikes 35–95 mm (1.4–3.7 in) long. Flowering occurs from May to October, and the pods are curved, coiled or twisted, 80–150 mm (3.1–5.9 in) long, 2–35 mm (0.079–1.378 in) wide, thinly leathery to papery, glabrous and slightly or variably constricted between, and raised over the seeds. The seeds are 3–4 mm (0.12–0.16 in) long and dark brown with a massive, yellow-orange aril that is longer than the seed.

Acacia leptocarpa resembles A. cowleana and A. elachantha but has glabrous and thinner phyllodes and longer, more curved pods. It is thought to be allied with A. tropica and A. cretata. The seed pods appear very similar to those of A. gardneri.

== Taxonomy ==
Acacia leptocarpa was first formally described in 1842 by the George Bentham in Hooker's London Journal of Botany, from an unpublished manuscript by Allan Cunningham of specimens collected between the Endeavour River and Cape Flinders in Queensland in 1820. The specific epithet (leptocarpa) means 'thin-fruited' referring to the thin seed pods.

== Distribution and habitat ==
This species of wattle is mostly found in open forest, occasionally in monsoon forest and rainforest margins from Carlton Hill Station in the Kimberley region of Western Australia and eastwards across the Top End of the Northern Territory including its offshore islands, to Cape York Peninsula and south to southern Central Queensland where it is found along the margins of watercourses and swampy areas growing in sandy or rocky soils occasionally around laterite in open Eucalyptus or Melaleuca woodland.

== See also ==
- List of Acacia species
