= Hat Island (Sverdrup Islands) =

Island in Nunavut, Canada

- Location within Nunavut Location within Canada

Geography
- Location: Eureka Sound
- Coordinates: 78°59′N 084°55′W
- Archipelago: Sverdrup Islands; Queen Elizabeth Islands; Arctic Archipelago

Administration
- Canada
- Territory: Nunavut
- Region: Qikiqtaaluk

Demographics
- Population: Uninhabited

Hat Island is an uninhabited island located in the Qikiqtaaluk Region of Nunavut, Canada. It is situated in Eureka Sound, at the confluence of Bay Fjord, east of Ellesmere Island's Raanes Peninsula and 19.6 km (12.2 mi) west of Stor Island. It is a member of the Sverdrup Islands group and the Arctic Archipelago. It is also a member of the Queen Elizabeth Islands and the Arctic Archipelago.

Another larger (about 4 × 8 km) Hat Island is also in Nunavut.
