= Fay Islands =

Archipelago in Nunavut, Canada

- Location within Nunavut Location within Canada

Geography
- Location: Sverdrup Channel
- Coordinates: 79°37′N 097°25′W
- Archipelago: Sverdrup Islands; Queen Elizabeth Islands; Arctic Archipelago

Administration
- Canada
- Territory: Nunavut
- Region: Qikiqtaaluk

Demographics
- Population: Uninhabited

The Fay Islands are part of the Sverdrup Islands in Qikiqtaaluk Region, Nunavut, Canada. Located in the Arctic Ocean, they are also members of the Queen Elizabeth Islands and Arctic Archipelago. They lie within the Sverdrup Channel between Meighen Island and the west coast of Axel Heiberg Island. Peary Channel and Amund Ringnes Island are to the south. The Fay Islands are four very small islands, on occasion mistaken as sediment-loaded glaciers.
