= Sverdrup Channel =

Watercourse in Nunavut, Canada

The Sverdrup Channel (80°00′N 097°45′W) is an area of sea in the Canadian Arctic Archipelago within the Qikiqtaaluk Region, Nunavut. To the north-west of the channel is Meighen Island, to the east is Axel Heiberg Island, and to the south is Amund Ringnes Island. The Fay Islands are located in the channel.
