= Meighen Island =

Island in Nunavut, Canada

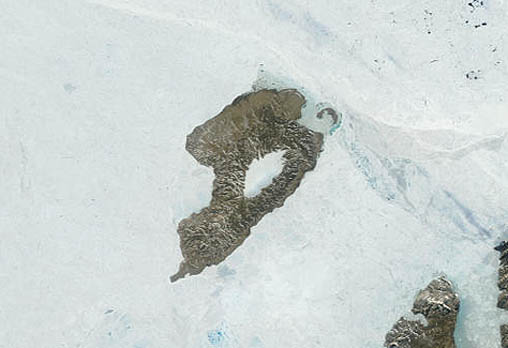
- Satellite view of Meighen Island

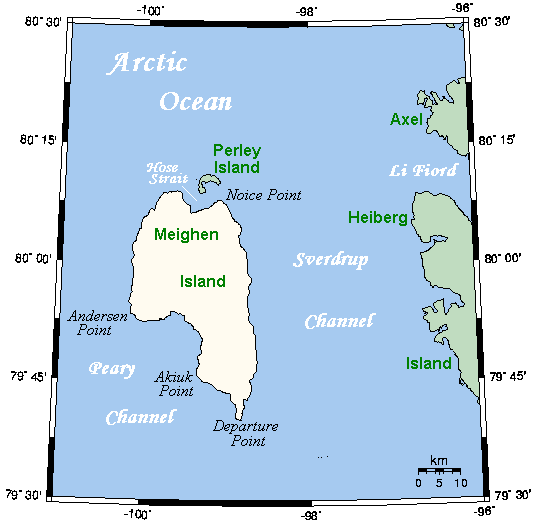

- Location within Nunavut

Geography
- Location: Arctic Ocean
- Coordinates: 79°59′N 099°30′W
- Archipelago: Sverdrup Islands; Queen Elizabeth Islands; Arctic Archipelago
- Area: 955 km^{2} (369 sq mi)
- Length: 56 km (34.8 mi)
- Width: 30 km (19 mi)

Administration
- Canada
- Territory: Nunavut
- Region: Qikiqtaaluk

Demographics
- Population: Uninhabited

Meighen Island is an uninhabited member of the Queen Elizabeth Islands, part of the Arctic Archipelago, in the Qikiqtaaluk Region of Nunavut, Canada.

Located at 79°59′N 099°30′W, it measures 955 square kilometres (369 sq mi) in size and is topped with an ice cap. The island is permanently icebound, and its northwestern coast faces onto the Arctic Ocean.

== History ==
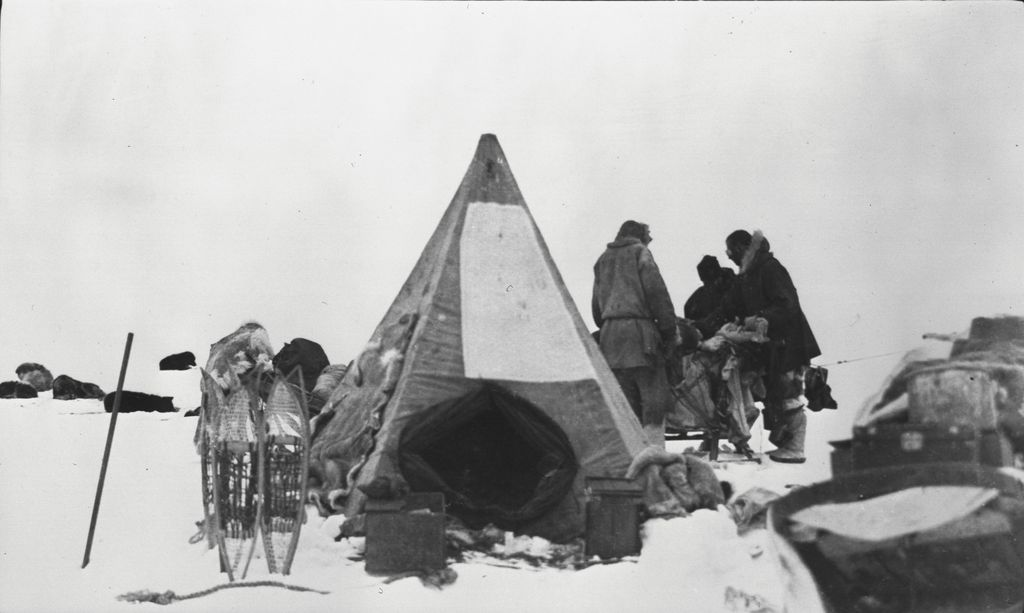
Camp of the Canadian Arctic Expedition on Meighen Island

Unlike many Canadian Arctic islands, no traces of Inuit or Thule camps have been found, suggesting the island has never been inhabited, likely due to its extreme northern latitude.

In 1909, two Inuit who had participated in Frederick Cook's polar expedition provided a map to Robert Peary that showed they had travelled and spent a night on a then unknown island with the position of Meighen Island. The map and testimony of the Inuit in question were published in an article by Peary in the Chicago Daily Tribune. In 1916, the Canadian Arctic Expedition led by Vilhjalmur Stefansson sighted and landed on Meighen Island. Stefansson at first believed that he had been the first European to discover Meighen Island, but later read Peary's article on the Cook expedition and surmised that Cook had in fact discovered Meighen Island prior to himself.

=== Naming ===
The island was later named after Arthur Meighen, Canadian prime minister 1920-21 and 1926.

== Neighbouring islands ==
Meighen Island has few neighbours. It is about 40 km (25 mi) west of the next nearest major island, Axel Heiberg Island. About 4 km (2.5 mi) to Meighen's north, across the Hose Strait, lies small crescent-shaped Perley Island. The Fay Islands lie between Meighen Island and Axel Heiberg Island within the Sverdrup Channel.

== Structures ==
The island has an automatic weather station near the centre of the ice cap. The ice cap also has many mass balance polls.

== Bibliography ==
- Mills, William James (2003). Exploring Polar Frontiers: A Historical Encyclopedia. Bloomsbury Academic. ISBN 9781576074220.
