= Tasiujaq (disambiguation) =

Tasiujaq is a northern village municipality in Quebec. It may also refer to:

- Tasiujaq (Inuit reserved land), in Quebec, Canada
- Tasiujaq (Baffin Bay), a sound in Nunavut Canada
- Tasiujaq (Foxe Basin), a bay in Nunavut Canada
- Tasiujaq (Inugsuin Fiord), a bay in Nunavut Canada

== See also ==
- Tasiusaq
