= Eureka Sound =

- Location in Nunavut
- Coordinates: 79°0′N 87°0′W
- Basin countries: Canada
- Settlements: Fort Eureka

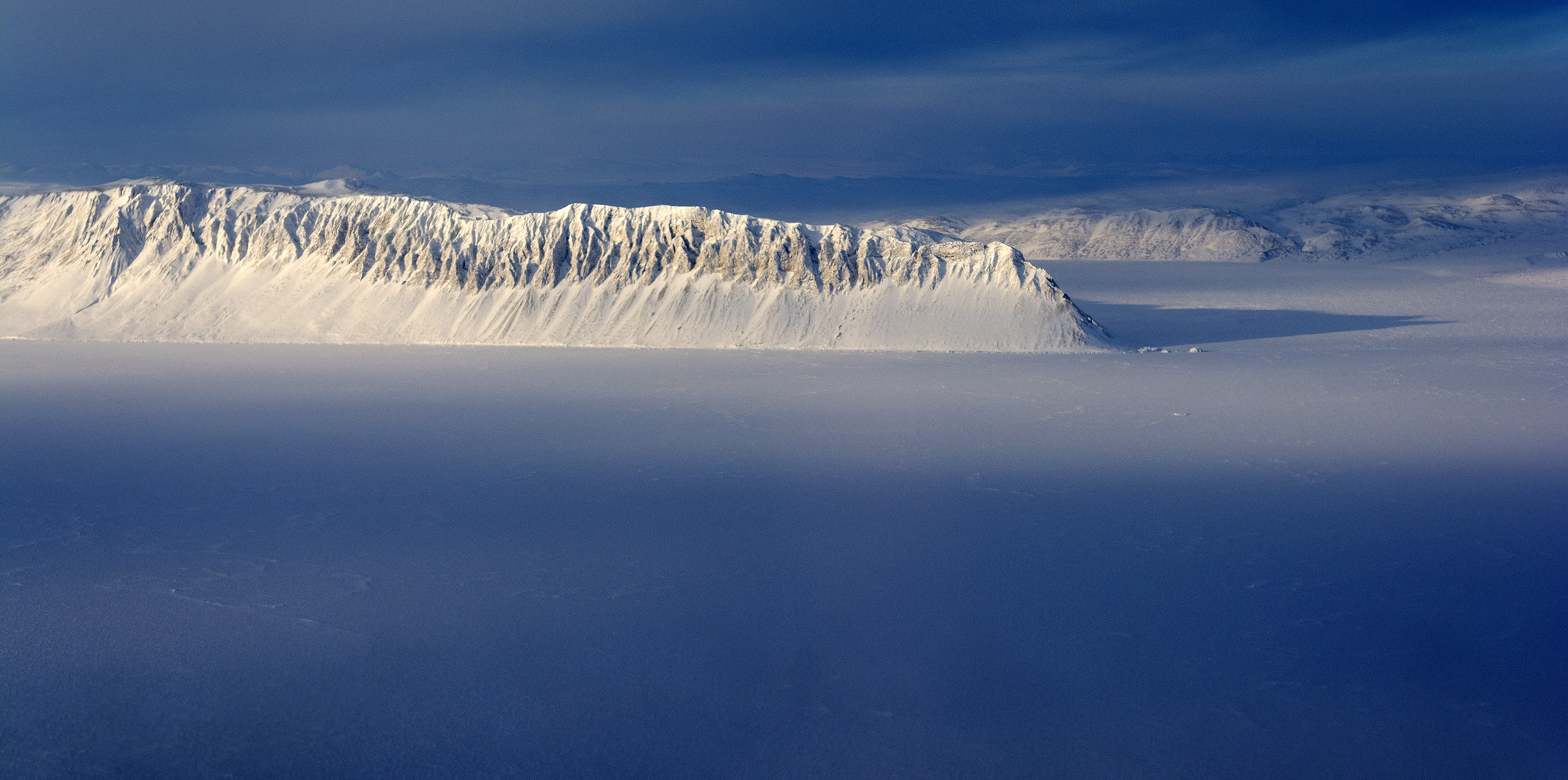
Eureka Sound on Ellesmere Island as seen on a flight in March 2014.

Eureka Sound is a high Arctic waterway in Qikiqtaaluk, Nunavut, Canada. It separates Axel Heiberg Island from Ellesmere Island. Stor Island is located within the sound. Eureka Sound is 290 km (180 mi) long, and 13–48 km (8.1–29.8 mi) wide. Fort Eureka is nearby.
