= Putulik =

Island in Nunavut, Canada

- Location within Nunavut Location within Canada

Geography
- Location: Northern Canada
- Coordinates: 68°19′14″N 100°07′18″W
- Archipelago: Arctic Archipelago
- Area: 32 km^{2} (12 sq mi)

Administration
- Canada
- Territory: Nunavut
- Region: Kitikmeot

Demographics
- Population: uninhabited

Putulik, formerly Hat Island, is a small (about 4 km × 8 km [2.5 mi × 5.0 mi]) uninhabited island located in the Kitikmeot of Nunavut, Canada. The island is situated in Victoria Strait (Queen Maud Gulf) approximately 110 km (68 mi) southeast of Victoria Island and 80 km (50 mi) southwest of King William Island. The Requisite Channel separates the island from Amundsen Island, the larger of the Nordenskiöld Islands.

Hat Island (CAM-B) is a former Distant Early Warning Line and current North Warning System site The Canadian government's Contaminated Sites directorate has determined Hat Island to be a contaminated site in need of future remediation.

Another smaller Hat Island is also in Nunavut.
