= Stor Island =

Island in Nunavut, Canada

- Location in Nunavut Stor Island (Canada)

Geography
- Location: Eureka Sound
- Coordinates: 78°59′N 085°50′W
- Archipelago: Sverdrup Islands; Queen Elizabeth Islands; Arctic Archipelago
- Area: 316 km^{2} (122 sq mi)

Administration
- Canada
- Territory: Nunavut
- Region: Qikiqtaaluk

Demographics
- Population: Uninhabited
- Source: Stor Island at Atlas of Canada

Stor Island is one of the uninhabited islands in Qikiqtaaluk Region, Nunavut, Canada. It is located in Eureka Sound, an area separating Axel Heiberg Island from Ellesmere Island. Fulmar Channel is southwest of the island, while Bay Fiord is to the northeast. Stor Island is a member of the Sverdrup Islands, Queen Elizabeth Islands, and the Arctic Archipelago.

There are two peaks that reach approximately 500 m above sea level. Stor Island is 32 km long and 14 km wide.
