= Tasiusaq =

Tasiusaq may refer to the following placenames in Greenland:

- Tasiusaq, Kujalleq, a settlement in Kujalleq municipality in southern Greenland.
- Tasiusaq, Avannaata, a settlement in Avannaata municipality in northwestern Greenland.
- Tasiusaq Bay, a bay in Avannaata municipality in northwestern Greenland.

== See also ==
- Tasiujaq (disambiguation)
