= Scaife Glacier =

Glacier in Nunavut, Canada

Coordinates: 79.92°N 93.78°W

Axel Heiberg Island
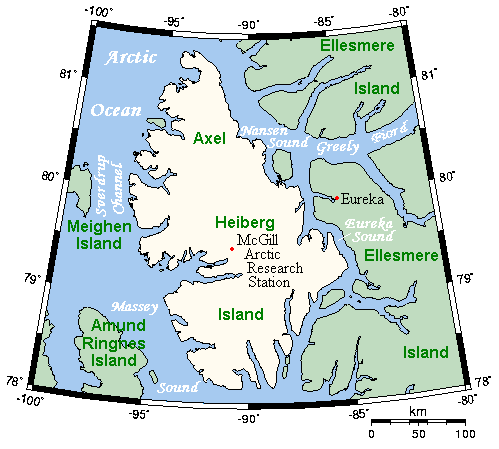
- Closeup map of Axel Heiberg Island

- Location of Axel Heiberg Island

Demographics
- Population: Uninhabited

Sergeant Kenneth Scaife
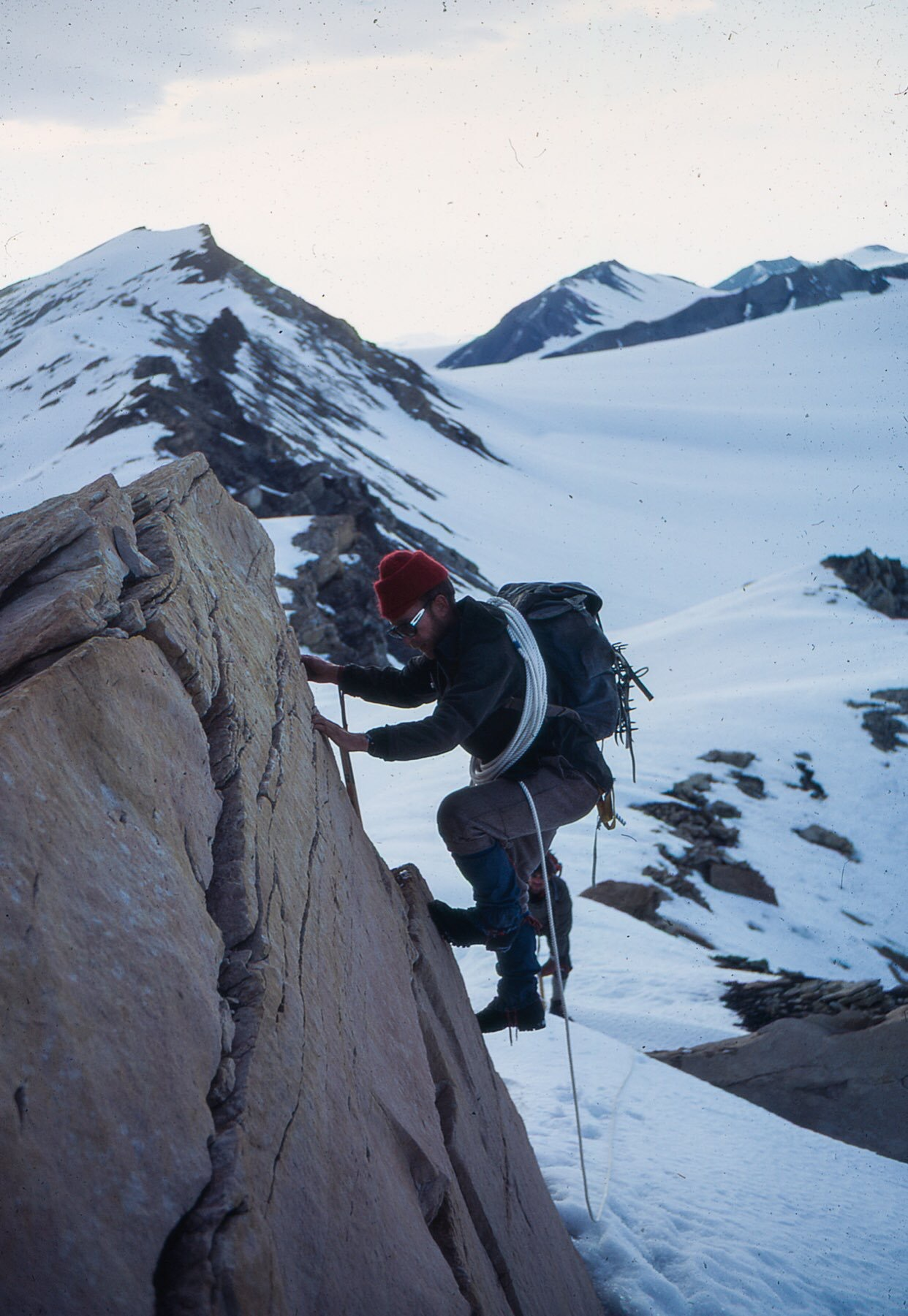
- Expedition Photo August 1972, showing Kenneth Scaife climbing a rock-face
- Born: 30 June 1939; Yorkshire, England
- Died: 9 August 1972 (aged 33); Axel Heiberg Island, Canada
- Spouse: Edith Helen Scaife (née Stronach)
- Military career
- Branch: Para, RAOC
- Service years: 12
- Rank: Sergeant
- Units: 31 Army Youth Team, Donnington, Shropshire
- Conflicts: Aden Emergency
- Awards: GSM with Radfan bar

Scaife Glacier is located on Axel Heiberg Island in the Qikiqtaaluk Region of Nunavut in the Canadian High Arctic.

== Naming ==
The Scaife Glacier is named after Sergeant Kenneth Scaife (born 1939) who died in an accident in the area on 9 August 1972, while on the final stage of a British Army Expedition.

The naming of the glacier was submitted to the Canadian Permanent committee on Geographical Names by the expedition leader Major John Muston, along with another 37 suggestions; this name was the only one to be accepted.

== Accident details ==
On 9 August 1972 a party left Drop Camp to travel to Base Camp down Airdrop Glacier. The party of 4 left Drop Camp at about 1030 hours and by 1100 hours were negotiating the badly crevassed area one mile west of Drop Camp. It was raining hard and visibility was poor.

The first two major crevasses were crossed and the first rope pair had successfully negotiated the third crevasse when the accident occurred. While crossing the narrow ice bridge, Sapper Lewis's pulk (a small sled or sledge) slid off the bridge and pulled him backwards into the crevasse. It may have been that Scaife was too close behind Lewis and that there was some slack rope between them, but, whatever the cause, Scaife did not hold Lewis and was also pulled into the crevasse.

Dilly and Lane unhitched from their pulks and ran back. Dilly climbed down 20 feet but could see no sign of either of the fallen climbers. Dilly climbed back and they returned to collect more equipment from their pulks. Returning to the crevasse Dilly weighted a rope with a piton hammer and lowered the end down the crevasse. Dilly then abseiled down the rope and on reaching the end found himself within 20 feet of Lewis. Traversing to Lewis he cut him free from his pulk and carried him to a more secure position on a narrow ledge where he wrapped a tent around him.

Scaife was a further 40 feet down (a total of 150 feet) so since there was no more rope Dilly took the rope off and climbed down to Scaife. After digging him out from a mass of loose snow he was placing him in the coma position when he stopped breathing. In spite of attempts at resuscitation Scaife did not recover, and after assuring himself that Scaife was dead Dilly returned to Lewis who was now partly conscious.

It took Dilly and Lane about an hour to drag Lewis to the top even with the aid of a Karabiner pulley system. 17 hours later a rescue party arrived at the crevasse to rescue Sapper Lewis. It was regretfully decided that no attempt should be made to recover Scaife's body in view of the risk involved. The leader read the burial service at the side of the crevasse. Sapper Lewis survived.

Lt Cdr Dilley was awarded the George Medal for his part in the rescue.

== Expedition members ==
- Major A J Muston RAOC, Leader
- Surgeon Lt Cdr P N Dilly GM RNR, Accident party
- Captain M T King RAOC
- Lt J W Chuter REME
- Lt P R West RA
- Lt F S MacKenzie Royal Signals
- Lt D A Malcolm RA
- Lt R J Ebdon Royal Signals
- Sgt K Scaife RAOC, Accident party
- Cpl B R Lane
- LCpl M "Bronco" Lane, Accident party
- Sapper D F J Lewis RE, Accident party
