= McGill Arctic Research Station =

- Research Station
- Location within Nunavut Location within Canada
- Coordinates: 79°26′00″N 090°46′00″W
- Country: Canada
- Territory: Nunavut
- Region: Qikiqtaaluk Region
- Elevation: 577 ft (176 m)

Population
  - Total: 0
- Time zone: UTC-06:00 (CST)
  - Summer (DST): UTC-05:00 (CDT)
- Website: web.archive.org/web/20210927034324/https://www.mcgill.ca/mars/

McGill Arctic Research Station (Expedition Fiord) (MARS) is a small research station operated by McGill University located near the centre of Axel Heiberg Island, Nunavut. It is located approximately 115 km (71 mi) southwest of Eureka, a weather and research station. It was first established in 1959 after scientists explored South Fiord (Expedition Fiord). The station contains a small hut, a cook house and two temporary structures. It can support 8-12 people and gives them access to the research activities. The current activities are glaciology, climate change, permafrost, hydrology, geology, geomorphology, limnology, planetary analogues, and microbiology. Today, the station is only used in the summer months so there would be enough power generated from the solar panels.

The director of the research station is Wayne Pollard (from McGill University). He has many experiences with drilling and geophysical tools. His goals are to identify niche environments in permafrost capable of harbouring microbial life at or near the limit of its habitability.

== Geography ==
McGill Arctic Research Station is located near the terminus of three glaciers: Baby Glacier, White Glacier and Thompson Glacier. It is also beside the Expedition River and Colour Lake. The glaciers have been monitored from 1960 to 1999 with gaps in between them. The closest community is Grise Fiord, 360 km (220 mi) away. However, all flights to and from the station all go through Resolute Bay Airport, which is more than 500 km (310 mi) away. The area surrounding it are rolling hills and tall mountains.

== Climate ==
The average temperature at the research station is −15 °C (5 °F). Because of the cold temperatures, they can test how microbes can survive on the other colder planets in the Solar System. The station receives polar night from the about October 22 until just after the middle of February, and the midnight sun from the middle of April until August 27.

== See also ==
- Qikiqtaaluk, Unorganized - the census area to which McGill Arctic Research Station belongs
- List of research stations in the Arctic
