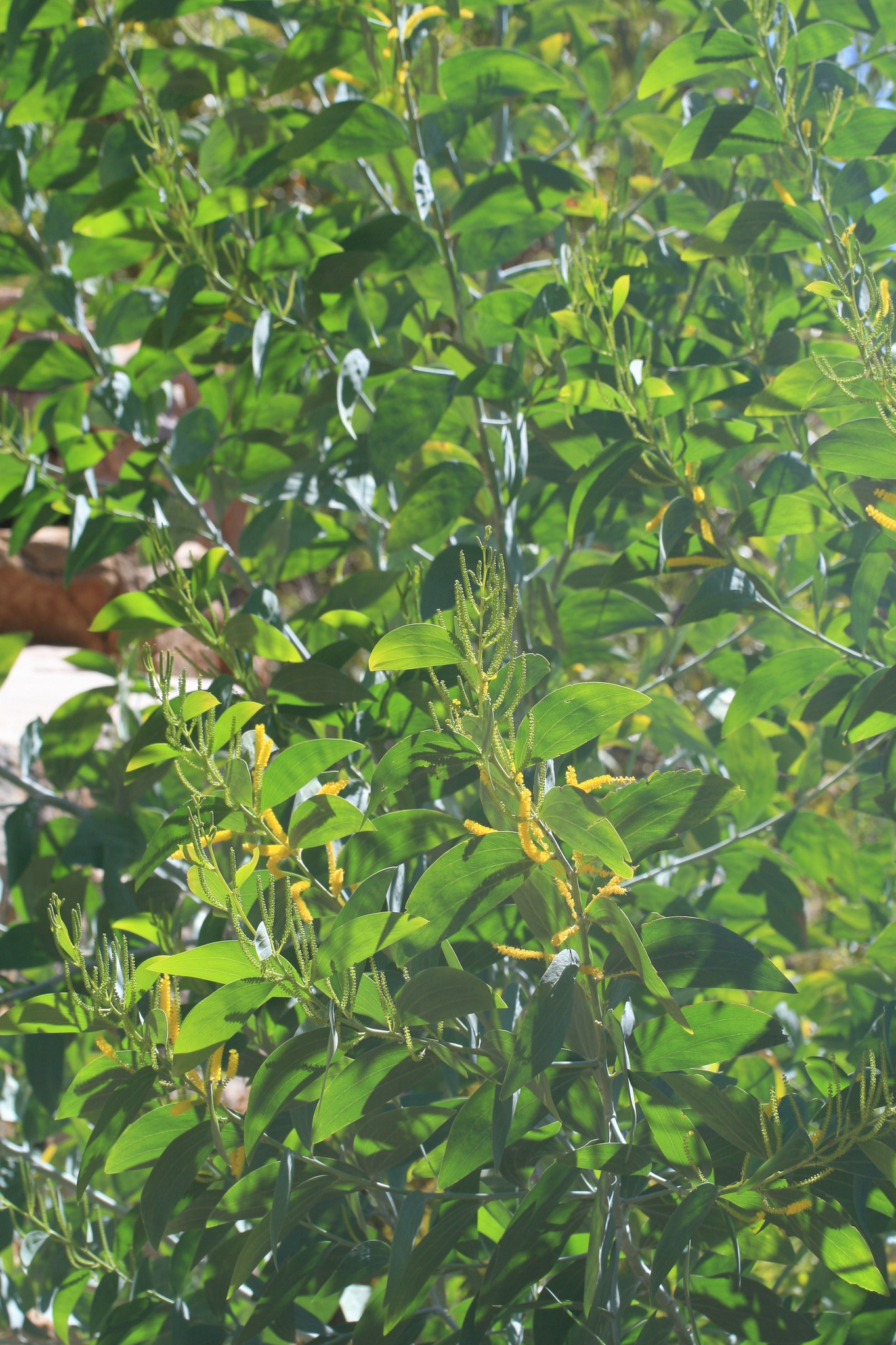

Scientific classification
- Kingdom: Plantae
- Clade: Tracheophytes
- Clade: Angiosperms
- Clade: Eudicots
- Clade: Rosids
- Order: Fabales
- Family: Fabaceae
- Subfamily: Caesalpinioideae
- Clade: Mimosoid clade
- Genus: Acacia
- Species: A. gardneri

Binomial name
- Acacia gardneri Maiden & Blakely
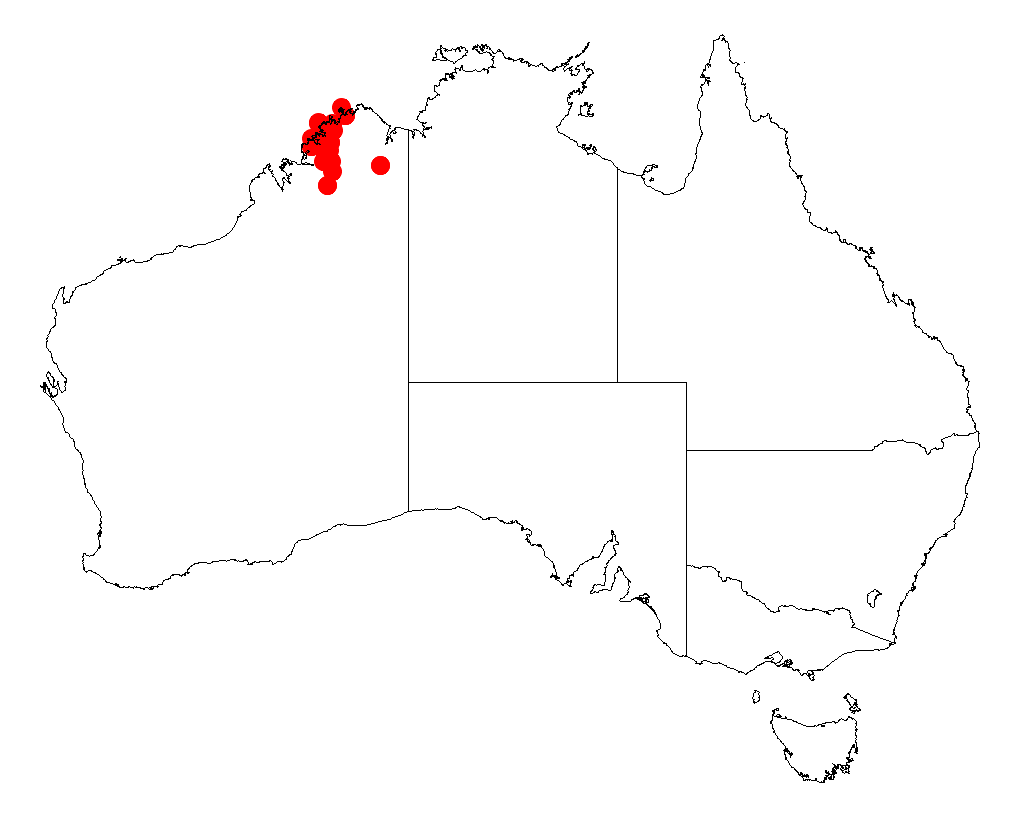
- Occurrence data from AVH

Synonyms
- Racosperma gardneri (Maiden & Blakely) Pedley

= Acacia gardneri =

Species of legume

Acacia gardneri is a species of flowering plant in the family Fabaceae and is endemic to the far north of Western Australia. It is a slender, erect, glabrous shrub or tree with smooth bark, terete, light brown branchlets, narrowly elliptic phyllodes, spikes of pale yellow flowers and linear, thinly leathery pods, raised over and constricted between the seeds.

== Description ==
Acacia gardneri is small tree or shrub that typically grows to a height up to 1.8–6 m (5 ft 11 in – 19 ft 8 in) and has smooth bark covered with a white, powdery bloom. The branchlets are terete, light brown and more or less covered with the same powdery bloom. The phyllodes are narrowly elliptic, abruptly narrowed at the base, 50–120 mm (2.0–4.7 in) long and 20–30 mm (0.79–1.18 in) wide with a curved upper margin and a more or less straight or curved lower margin. The phyllodes are slightly covered with a powdery bloom with three or four very prominent main veins. There is a gland up to 0.5 mm (0.020 in) above the base of the pulvinus. The flowers are pale yellow and loosely arranged along a spike 40–60 mm (1.6–2.4 in) long. Flowering occurs from May to August, and the pods are linear, thinly leathery, more or less twisted, 50–80 mm (2.0–3.1 in) long and more or less covered with a powdery bloom. The seeds are narrowly oblong, 4.0–4.5 mm (0.16–0.18 in) long and dark brown.

== Taxonomy ==
Acacia gardneri was first formally described in 1927 by the botanists Joseph Maiden and William Blakely in Journal of the Royal Society of Western Australia. The specific epithet (gardneri) honours the botanist and collector Charles Austin Gardner.

== Distribution and habitat ==
This species of wattle grows on seasonally inundated sandstone flats dissected by outcropping sandstone, or in sandy soil among quartzite rocks on the banks of streams in the Central Kimberley and Northern Kimberley bioregions of northern Western Australia.

== Conservation status ==
Acacia gardneri is listed as "not threatened" by the Government of Western Australia Department of Biodiversity, Conservation and Attractions.

== See also ==
- List of Acacia species
