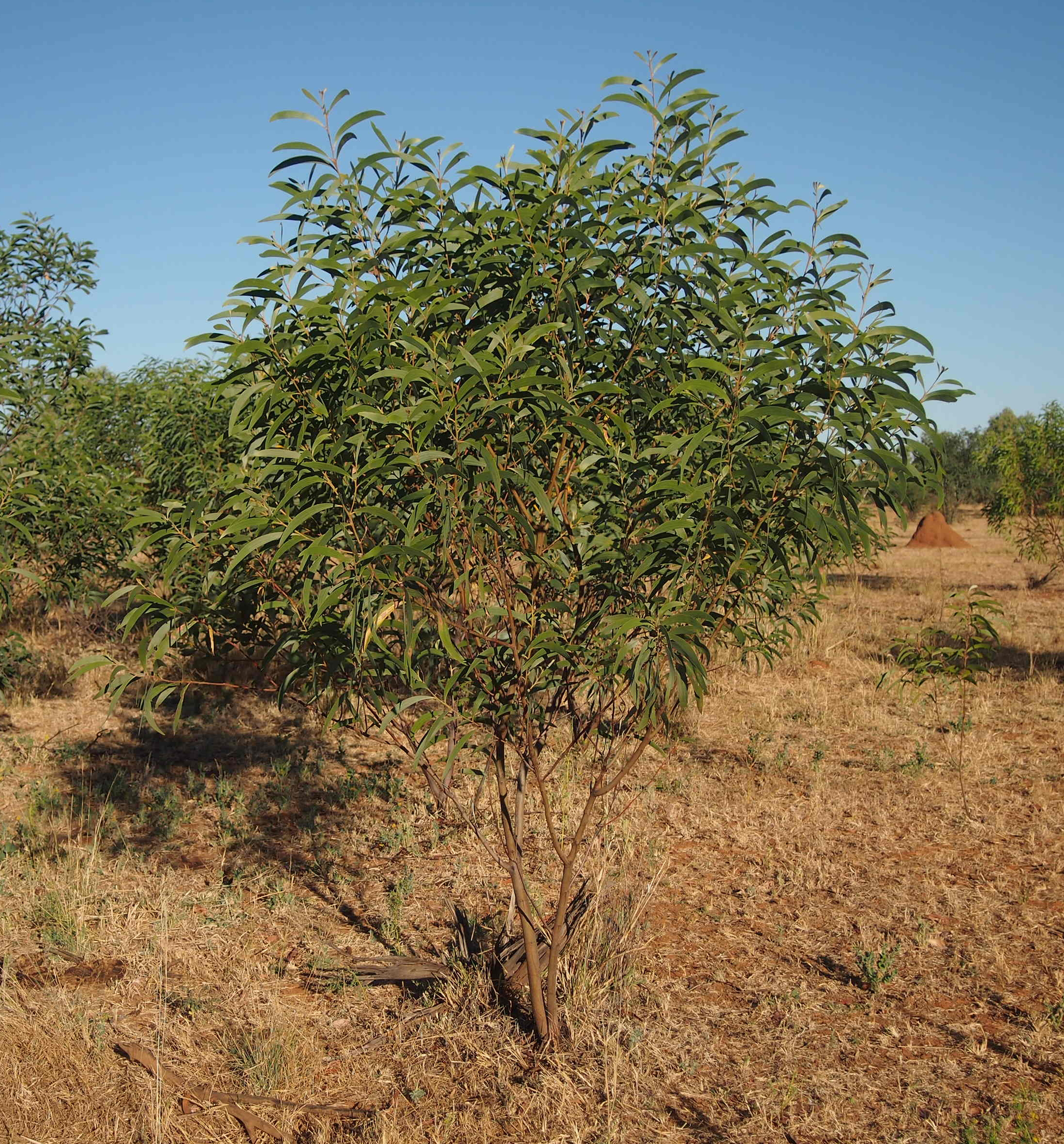

Scientific classification
- Kingdom: Plantae
- Clade: Tracheophytes
- Clade: Angiosperms
- Clade: Eudicots
- Clade: Rosids
- Order: Fabales
- Family: Fabaceae
- Subfamily: Caesalpinioideae
- Clade: Mimosoid clade
- Genus: Acacia
- Species: A. elachantha

Binomial name
- Acacia elachantha Maslin & M.W.McDonald
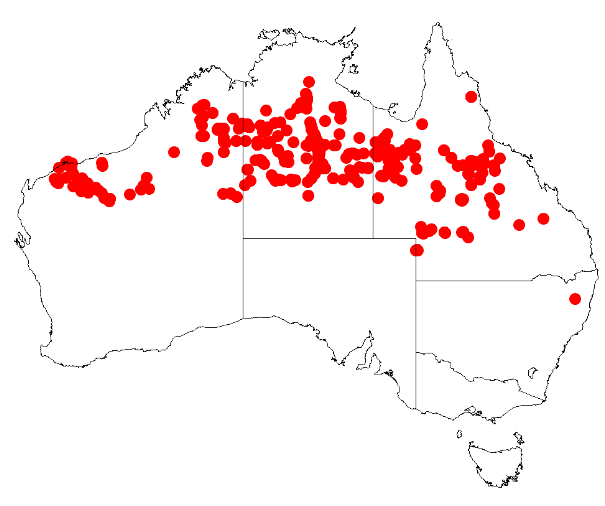
- Occurrence data from AVH

Synonyms
- Acacia cowleana Tate × Acacia tropica (Maiden & Blakely) Tindale; Acacia elachantha (hairy variant); Acacia elachantha (typical variant); Acacia sp. (Beta J.L.Boorman AQ521363); Racosperma elachanthum (M.W.McDonald & Maslin) Pedley; Acacia cowleana auct. non Tate: Pedley, L. (20 July 1978); Acacia cowleana auct. non Tate: Maslin, B.R. & Thomson, L.A.J. (18 December 1992)

= Acacia elachantha =

Species of plant

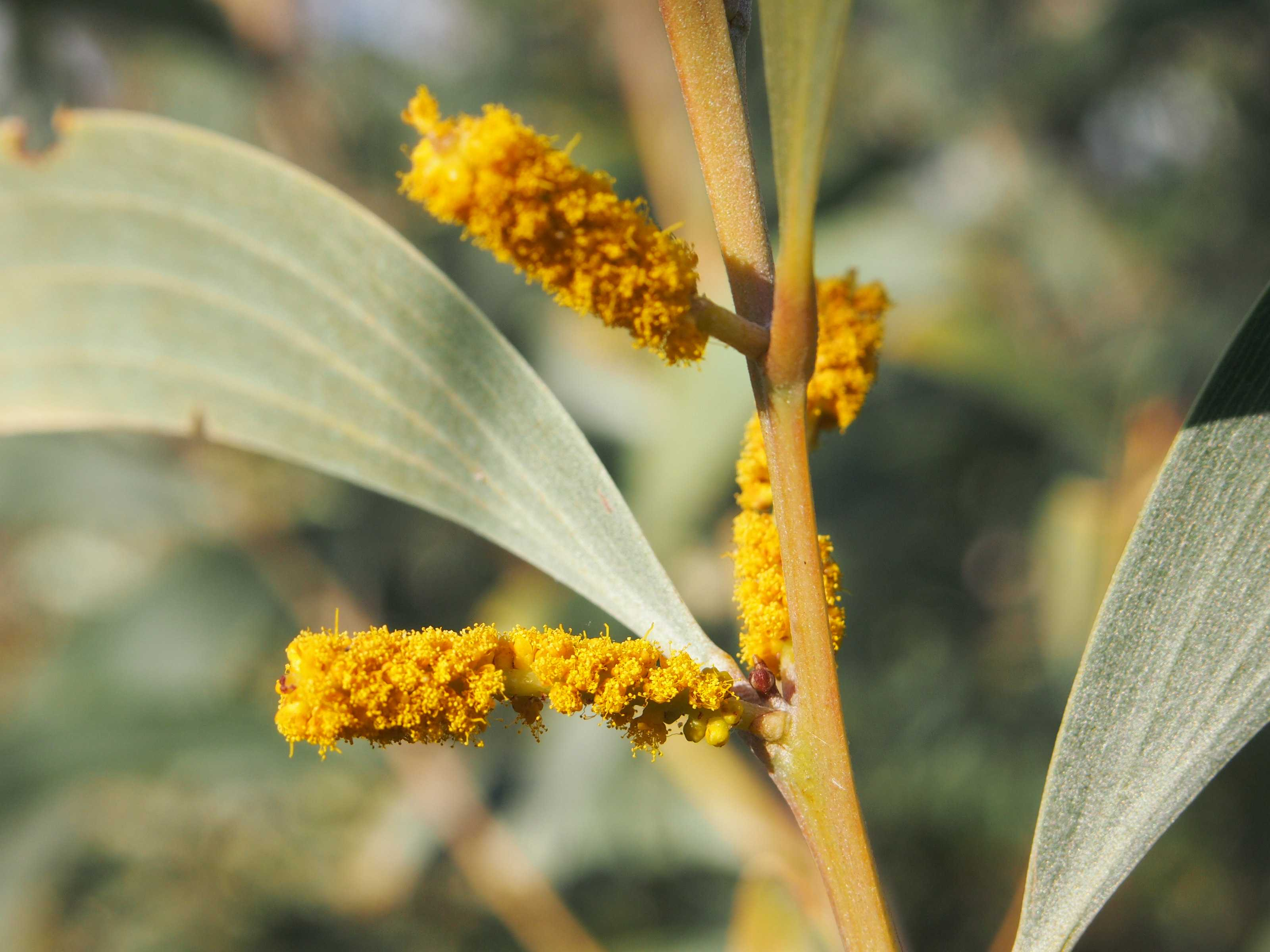
Flower spikes

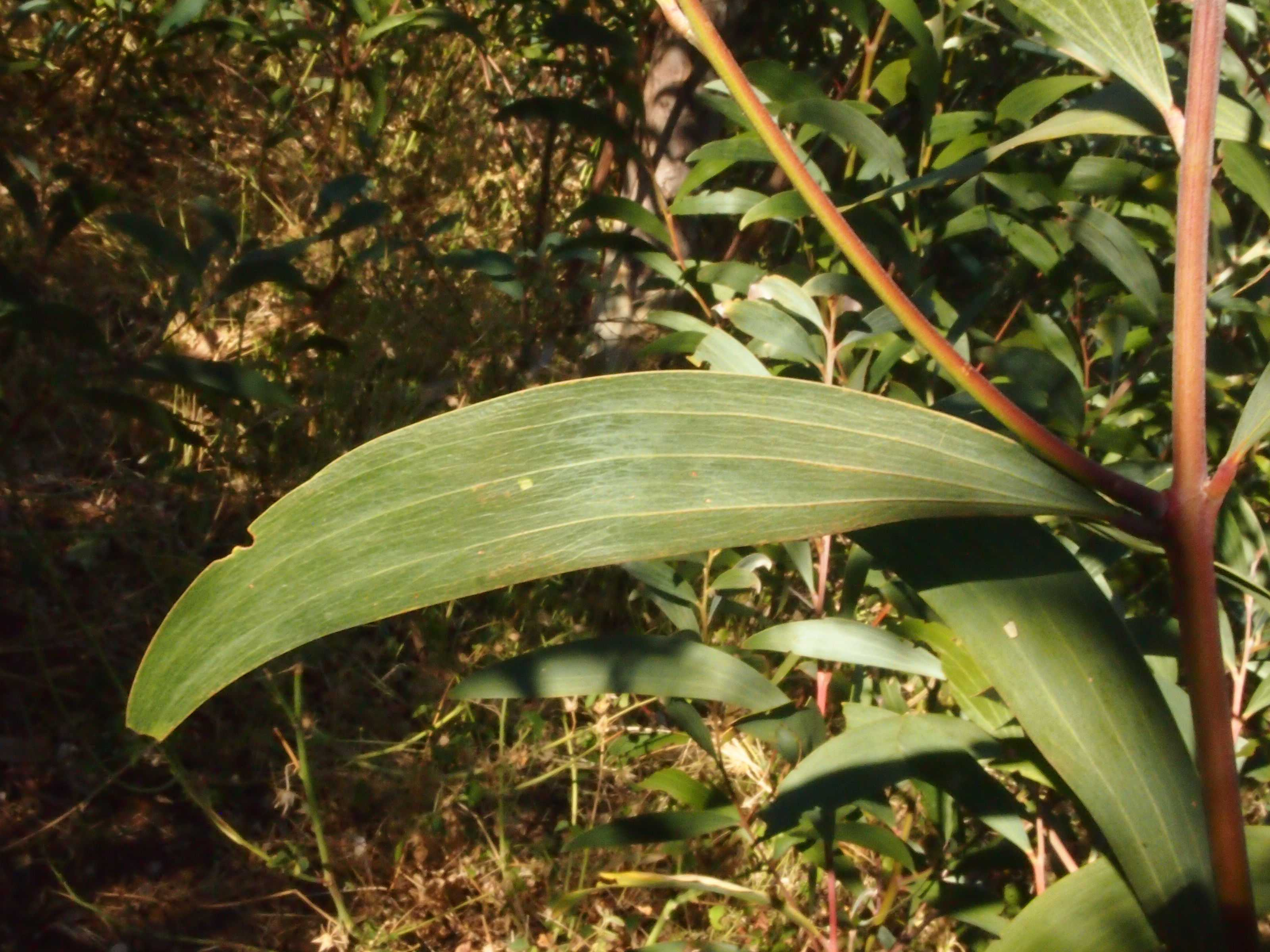
Leaf

Acacia elachantha is a species of flowering plant in the family Fabaceae and is endemic to northern Australia. It is a spindly, open shrub, rarely a tree, with branchlets covered with minute, silky hairs or glabrous, sickle-shaped phyllodes, spikes of light golden yellow flowers, and linear, straight to slightly curved, papery to leathery pods.

== Description ==
Acacia elachantha is a spindly shrub, 2–3 m (6 ft 7 in – 9 ft 10 in) high, rarely a tree 5–6 m (16–20 ft) tall. Its branchlets are glabrous or covered with minute silky hairs. The phyllodes are shallowly to strongly sickle-shaped 80–195 mm (3.1–7.7 in) long, 7–22 mm (0.28–0.87 in) wide and leathery, sometimes glabrous, or covered with minute silky hairs. The foliage is sparse and confined to the ends of branches. There are many longitudinal veins, 2 to 4 per 1 mm (0.039 in), with normally 3 more prominent than the rest. The flowers are light golden yellow and borne in one or two spikes in axils, 15–33 mm (0.59–1.30 in) long on peduncles 3–12 mm (0.12–0.47 in) long. Flowering usually occurs from May to August, and the pods are linear, straight to shallowly curved, 40–80 mm (1.6–3.1 in) long, 3.0–3.5 mm (0.12–0.14 in) wide, papery to leathery, glabrous to sparsely hairy. The seeds are more or less oblong, 3.5–4.0 mm (0.14–0.16 in) long, glossy dark brown to black with a yellow aril.

== Taxonomy ==
Acacia elachantha was first formally described by Bruce Maslin and Maurice W. McDonald in the journal Australian Systematic Botany from specimens collected 14 km (8.7 mi) west of the Cuddapan turn off along Birdsville–Windorah road in 1995. The specific epithet (elachantha) is taken from the Greek words elachys meaning small or little and anthos meaning flower referring to the smaller flower spikes compared to its closest relative A. cowleana.

== Distribution and habitat ==
This species of wattle Western Australia grows mainly in the tropical arid zone between latitudes 17° and 24°S from the Kimberley and Pilbara regions of Western Australia, the Northern Territory and central and south-western Queensland and far northern South Australia. The shrub grows mainly on sandplains in deep red sand or sandy loam soils but also occurs along watercourses or drainage lines, and on low rocky hills or lateritic plains in often skeletal soils. It is often found in disturbed areas such as road verges. It is often part of tall open shrubland communities or in low open woodlands along with species of Eucalyptus.

== Uses ==
Acacia elachantha is a fast growing but short-lived species usually dies after five years. It that regenerates rapidly from the large quantities of seed that it produces from an early age. The shrub can be used for soil rehabilitation as it is drought tolerant, fast growing and grows well in poor soils. The seed of the plant is edible and high nutritious. The bark contains tannins and are astringent and could be used to treat diarrhoea and dysentery. The gum can also be taken to treat diarrhoea and haemorrhoids. The wood can be used for light construction, as fuel or to make charcoal. It also useful as a nitrogen fixing plant.

== See also ==
- List of Acacia species
