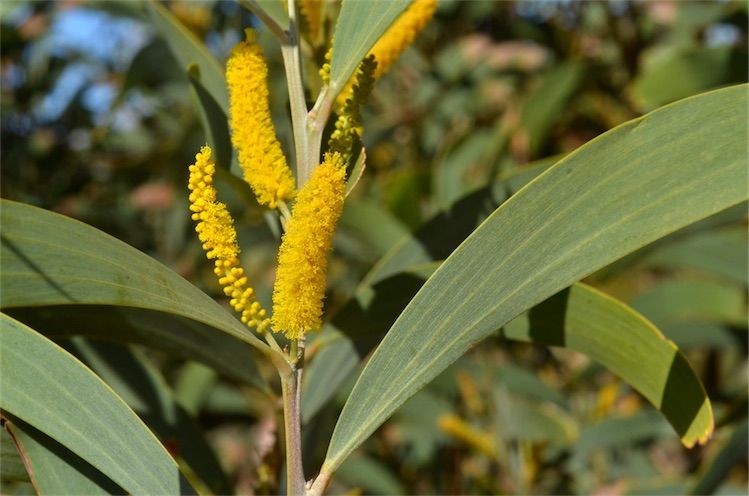
- In Australian Arid Lands Botanic Garden

Scientific classification
- Kingdom: Plantae
- Clade: Tracheophytes
- Clade: Angiosperms
- Clade: Eudicots
- Clade: Rosids
- Order: Fabales
- Family: Fabaceae
- Subfamily: Caesalpinioideae
- Clade: Mimosoid clade
- Genus: Acacia
- Species: A. cowleana

Binomial name
- Acacia cowleana Tate
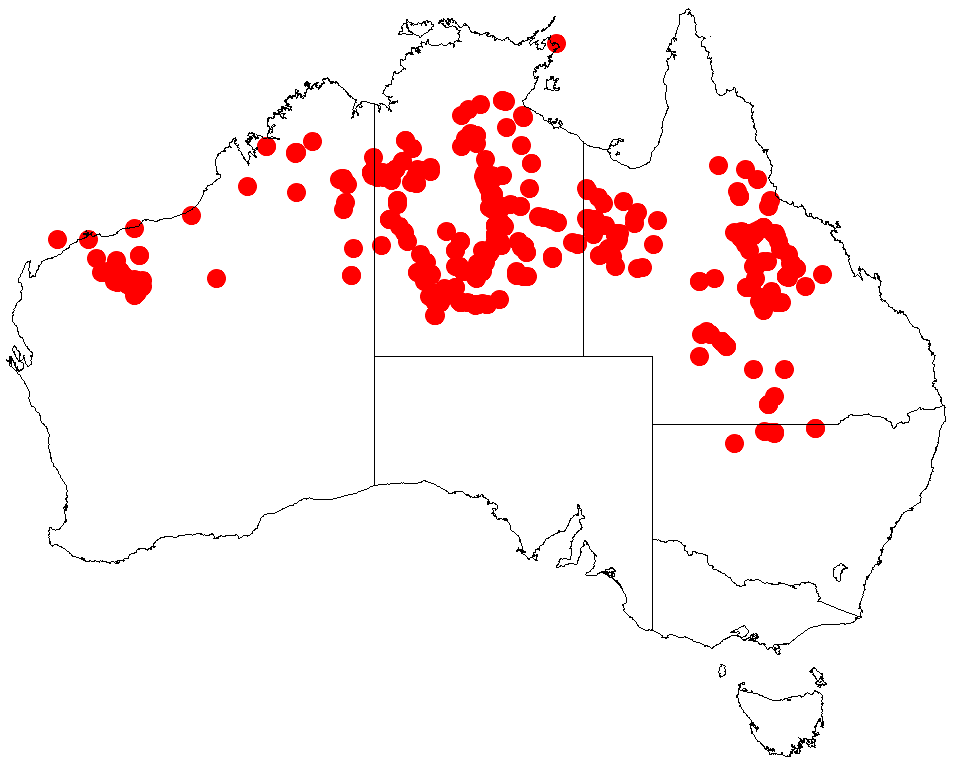
- Occurrence data from AVH

Synonyms
- Acacia cowleana Tate nom. inval., nom. nud.; Acacia crowleana Domin orth. var.; Acacia oligophleba Pedley; Racosperma cowleanum (Tate) Pedley; Racosperma oligophlebum (Pedley) Pedley

= Acacia cowleana =

Halls Creek wattle

Species of legume

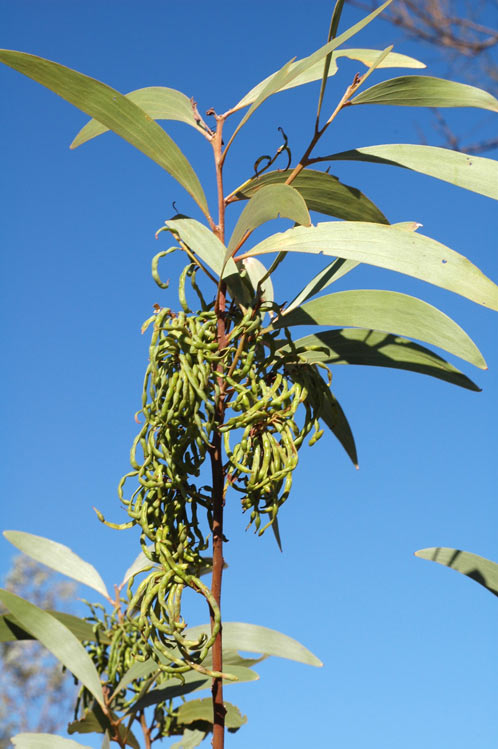
Pods in Karijini National Park

Acacia cowleana, commonly known as Halls Creek wattle, and other names in Australian Aboriginal languages, is a species of flowering plant in the family Fabaceae and is endemic to northern Australia. It is an erect, openly branched, sometimes spindly shrub or tree with leathery, more or less sickle-shaped phyllodes, spikes of bright golden yellow flowers and linear, papery to leathery pods.

== Description ==
Acacia cowleana is an open branched, sometimes spindly shrub that typically grows to a height of 1.5–3 m (4 ft 11 in – 9 ft 10 in), sometimes a tree to 8 m (26 ft) and has branchlets covered with minute, silky hairs. Its new shoots are initially encrusted with dark brown resin that hides the underlying hairs. The phyllodes are usually more or less sickle-shaped, 120–200 mm (4.7–7.9 in) long, 14–36 mm (0.55–1.42 in) wide and leathery, silvery green or greyish green to more or less glaucous with many longitudinal veins. The flowers are bright golden yellow and borne in one or two spikes 30–50 mm (1.2–2.0 in) long on peduncles 3–10 mm (0.12–0.39 in) long. Flowering occurs from late May to September, and the pods are linear, straight to curved, 3.5–5 mm (0.14–0.20 in) wide and papery to leathery, containing glossy dark brown to black oblong seeds, 3.5–5 mm (0.14–0.20 in) long with a yellow aril.

== Taxonomy and naming ==
Acacia cowleana was first formally described in 1896 by Ralph Tate in the Report on the work of the Horn Scientific Expedition to Central Australia. The specific epithet (cowleana) "is in compliment to Trooper Cowle, who conducted a section of our party to Mount Olga, and in various other ways promoted the scientific objects of our expedition".

This species is known as alerrey in the Arrernte language, alkart in the Anmatyerr language, barrabi in the language of the Djaru people, elkerte in the Kaytetye language, kilkiti in the Pintupi dialect and as kalkiarti in the Warlpiri language.

=== Distribution and habitat ===
Halls Creek wattle is found in the north of Western Australia, the Northern Territory, central Queensland and in northern New South Wales. It grows in a variety of soils, often along drainage lines, on rocky or gravelly ranges and foothills, often with Triodia species.

== Conservation status ==
Acacia cowleana is listed as "not threatened" by the Government of Western Australia Department of Biodiversity, Conservation and Attractions, as of "least concern" under the Northern Territory Government Territory Parks and Wildlife Conservation Act and the Queensland Government Nature Conservation Act 1992.

== See also ==
- List of Acacia species
