= Sverdrup Islands =

Archipelago of the Queen Elizabeth Islands, Nunavut, Canada

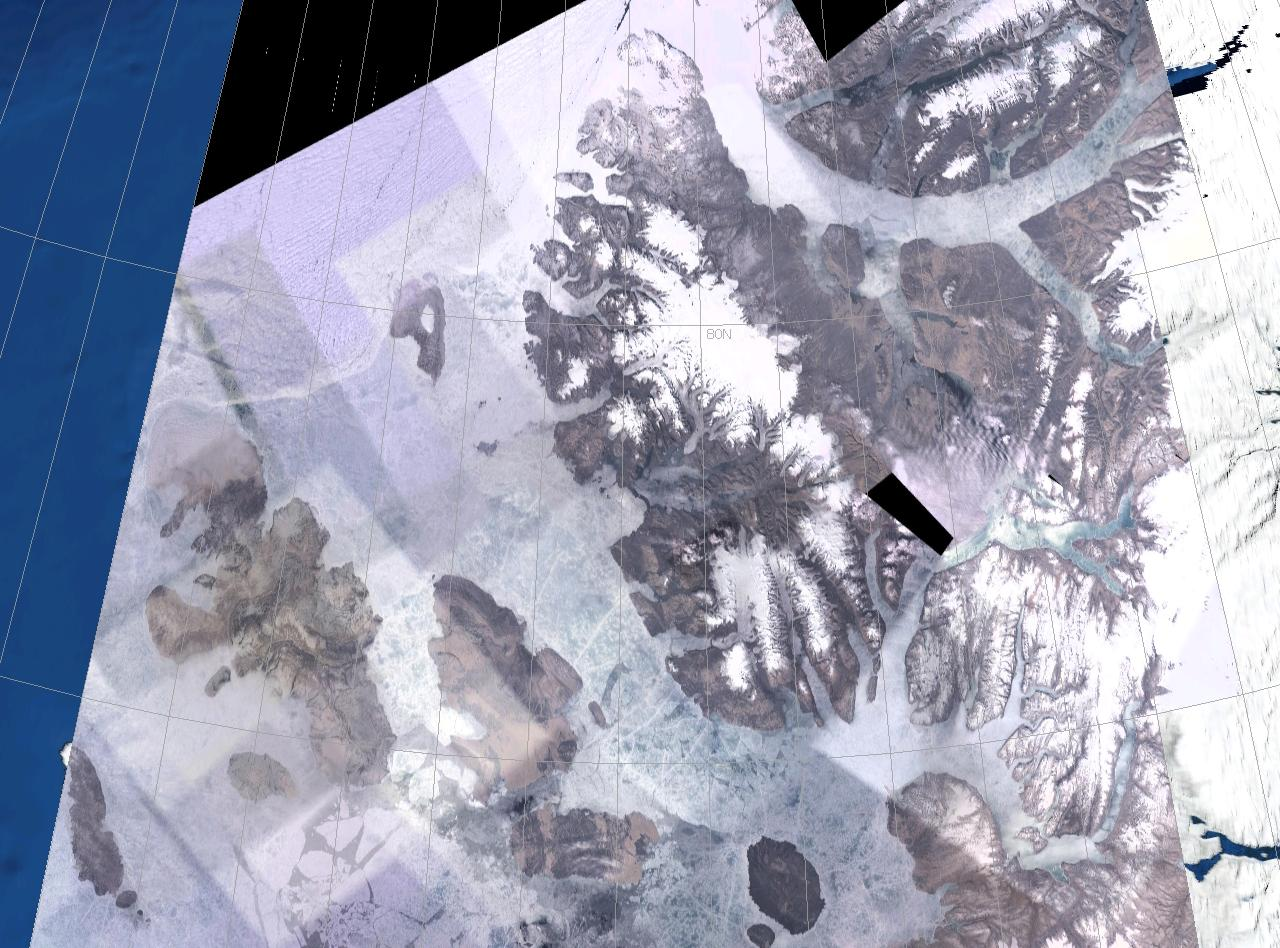
- NASA Landsat photo of the Sverdrup Islands; From left to right: Ellef Ringnes, Amund Ringnes, and Axel Heiberg islands.

- Location within Nunavut Location within Canada

Geography
- Location: Arctic Ocean
- Coordinates: 79°00′N 96°00′W
- Archipelago: Queen Elizabeth Islands, Arctic Archipelago
- Major islands: Axel Heiberg; Ellef Ringnes; Amund Ringnes
- Area: 66,000 km^{2} (25,000 sq mi)
- Highest elevation: 2,210 m (7250 ft)
- Highest point: Outlook Peak

Administration
- Canada
- Territory: Nunavut
- Region: Qikiqtaaluk
- Capital city: McGill Arctic Research Station

Demographics
- Population: 8 to 12 summer population
- Pop. density: 0.000015/km^{2} (3.9E-5/sq mi)

The Sverdrup Islands are an archipelago of the northern Queen Elizabeth Islands, in Nunavut, Canada. The islands, part of the Arctic Archipelago, are situated in the Arctic Ocean, west of Ellesmere Island from 77° to 81° North and 85° to 106° West.

== History ==
The islands are named after Norwegian explorer Otto Sverdrup, who explored and mapped them from 1898 to 1902 with the vessel Fram, although Inuit previously inhabited some of them. Sverdrup claimed the islands for Norway, but the Norwegian government showed no interest in pursuing the claim until 1928. At that point, the Norwegian government raised the claim, primarily to use the islands as bargaining chips in negotiations with the United Kingdom over the status of two other islands: the Jan Mayen in the Arctic and Bouvet Island in the Antarctic. On 11 November 1930, Norway recognized Canadian sovereignty over the Sverdrup Islands. On 19 November 1930, the United Kingdom recognized Norwegian sovereignty over Jan Mayen.

== Geography ==
The main islands of the group are Axel Heiberg Island, Ellef Ringnes Island, Amund Ringnes Island, Cornwall Island, Graham Island, Meighen Island, King Christian Island, Stor Island, and the archipelago also includes a number of smaller islands in the surrounding waters. The only inhabited place was Isachsen, a formerly staffed weather station, 1948 through 1978, on Ellef Ringnes Island and McGill Arctic Research Station on Axel Heiberg Island (a research station since 1959 occupied during the summer).

== Main islands ==
Island	Peak	Height m	Area km^{2}	Rank Canada	Rank World
Axel Heiberg	Outlook Peak	2,211	43,178	7	32
Ellef Ringnes	Isachsen Dome	260	11,295	16	69
Amund Ringnes	...	265	5,255	25	111
Meighen	Meighen Icecap	300	955	50	337
King Christian	King Christian Mountain	165	645	60	420
Stor	...	500	313	87	...
Sverdrup	Outlook Peak	2,211	66,000	-	-

== See also ==
- Former colonies and territories in Canada
- Territorial evolution of Canada after 1867
