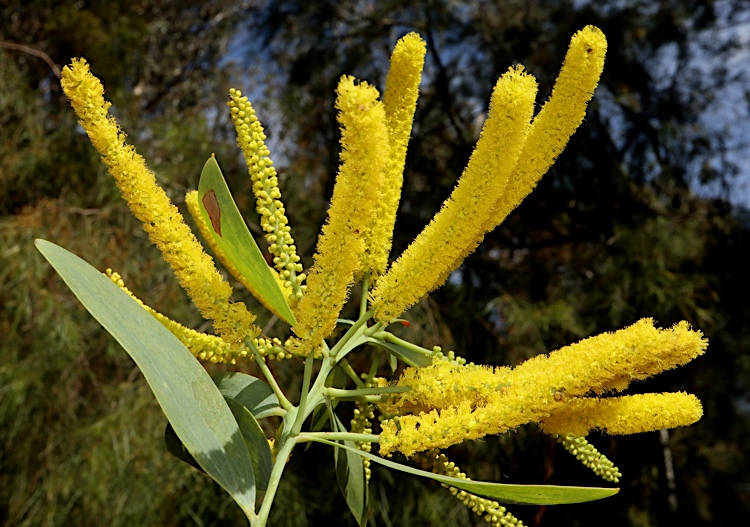

Scientific classification
- Kingdom: Plantae
- Clade: Tracheophytes
- Clade: Angiosperms
- Clade: Eudicots
- Clade: Rosids
- Order: Fabales
- Family: Fabaceae
- Subfamily: Caesalpinioideae
- Clade: Mimosoid clade
- Genus: Acacia
- Species: A. cretata

Binomial name
- Acacia cretata Pedley
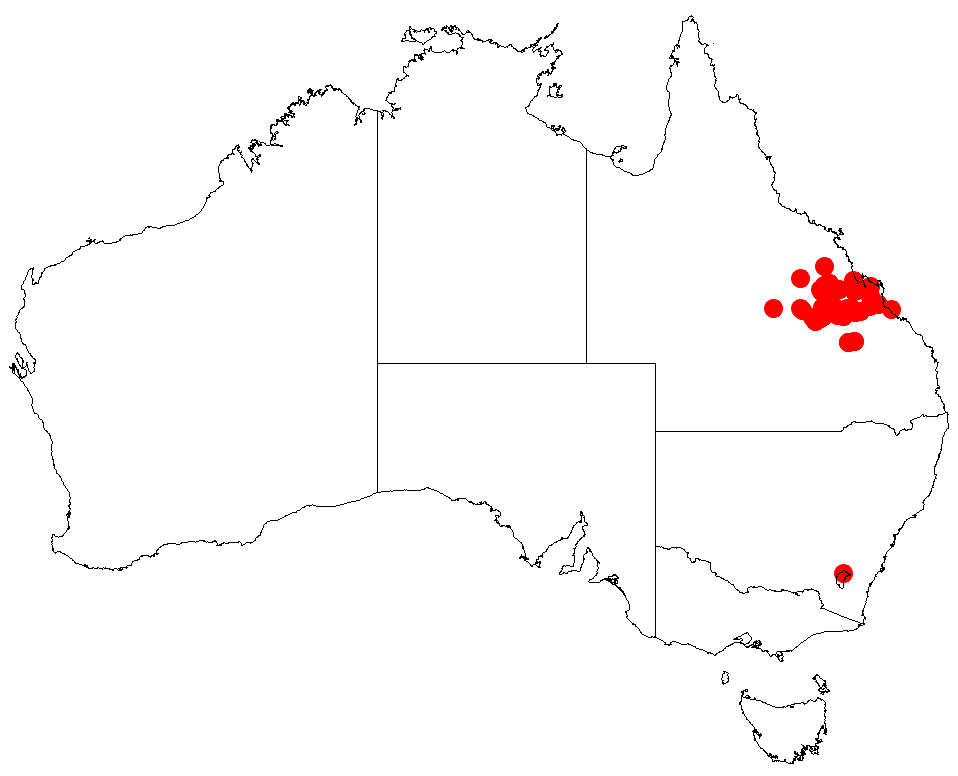
- Occurrence data from AVH

Synonyms
- Racosperma cretatum (Pedley) Pedley

= Acacia cretata =

Species of legume

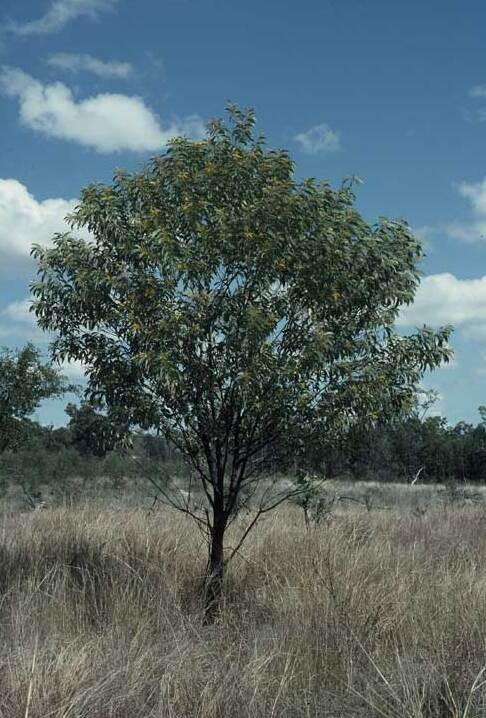
Habit

Acacia cretata is a species of flowering plant in the family Fabaceae and is endemic to Queensland, Australia. It is a single-stemmed shrub or tree with flattened branchlets, narrowly elliptic to elliptic phyllodes, spikes of bright yellow flowers and linear, glabrous pods raised over and constricted between the seeds.

== Description ==
Acacia cretata is a single-stemmed, round-topped shrub or tree that typically grows up to 8 m (26 ft) high and has smooth bark at first, later rough and fibrous. Its branchlets are flattened, glabrous, angular, brownish crimson with a whitish bloom. The phyllodes are narrowly elliptic to elliptic, 70–140 mm (2.8–5.5 in) long and 17–40 mm (0.67–1.57 in) wide, abruptly narrowed into short, stout petioles. The phyllodes are leathery, silvery bluish grey to glaucous with a hooked tip, the lower edge sometimes continuous with the branchlet. The flowers are borne in spikes 40–120 mm (1.6–4.7 in) long and bright yellow, the spikes on a peduncle 7–25 mm (0.28–0.98 in) long. Flowering occurs between July and September and the pods are linear, 60–100 mm (2.4–3.9 in) long and 3–5 mm (0.12–0.20 in) wide, thinly crusty and glabrous, raised over and more or less constricted between the seeds. The seeds are black, oblong, 4–6 mm (0.16–0.24 in) long and 1.8–2.0 mm (0.071–0.079 in) wide with a yellow aril.

== Taxonomy ==
Acacia cretata was first formally described in 1969 by the botanist Leslie Pedley in Contributions from the Queensland Herbarium.

== Distribution ==
This species of wattle occurs in Queensland along the Great Dividing Range between Mara and Moranbah and is common on the Blackdown Tableland, where it grows in open forest in sandy, gravelly or loamy soils, usually over sandstone.

== Conservation status ==
Acacia cretata is listed as of "least concern" under the Queensland Government Nature Conservation Act 1992.

== See also ==
- List of Acacia species
