= Axel Heiberg Island =

Uninhabited island in the Qikiqtaaluk Region, Nunavut, Canada

Axel Heiberg
Native name: ᐅᒥᖕᒪᑦ ᓄᓈᑦ
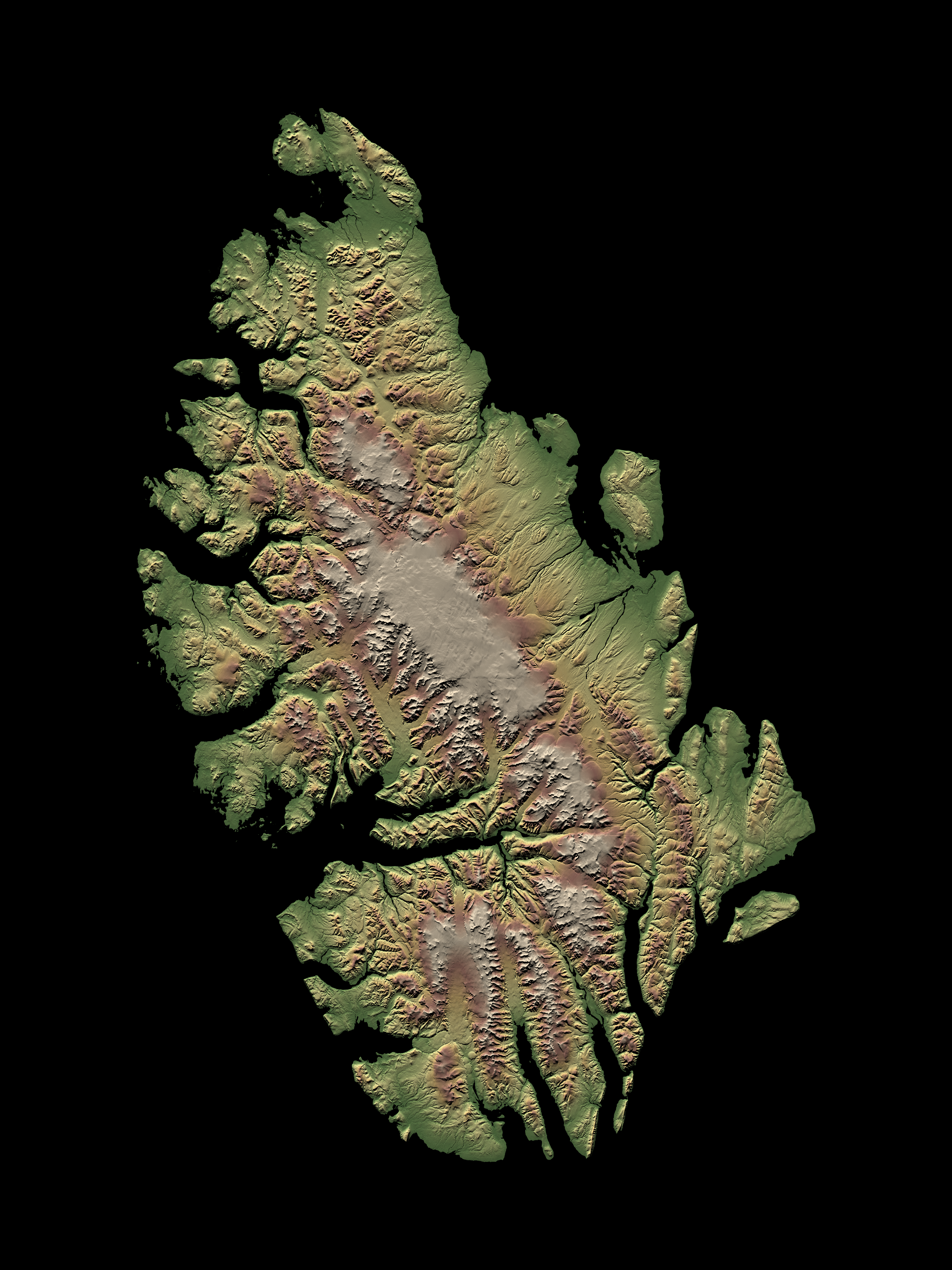
- Shaded relief map of Axel Heiberg Island. Note that the colours are indicative of elevation, not foliage or ground cover.

- Location of Axel Heiberg Island

- Location within Nunavut Location within Canada

Geography
- Location: Arctic Ocean
- Coordinates: 79°45′N 091°00′W
- Archipelago: Sverdrup Islands; Queen Elizabeth Islands; Arctic Archipelago
- Area: 42,276.97 km^{2} (16,323.23 sq mi) (2026)
- Area rank: 9th in Canada & 34th worldwide
- Length: 371 km (230.5 mi)
- Width: 220–246 km (137–153 mi)
- Highest elevation: 2,210 m (7250 ft)
- Highest point: Outlook Peak

Administration
- Canada
- Territory: Nunavut
- Region: Qikiqtaaluk

Demographics
- Population: 0

Axel Heiberg Island (Note: Inuktitut: ᐅᒥᖕᒪᑦ ᓄᓈᑦ, Umingmat Nunaat) is an uninhabited island in the Qikiqtaaluk Region, Nunavut, Canada. Located in the Arctic Ocean, it is the 34th largest island in the world and Canada's ninth largest island. According to the United States Geological Survey, Esri, and the United Nations Environment Programme - World Conservation Monitoring Centre it has an area of 42,276.97 km^{2} (16,323.23 sq mi). It is named after Axel Heiberg. One of the larger members of the Arctic Archipelago, it is also a member of the Sverdrup Islands and Queen Elizabeth Islands. It is known for its unusual fossil forests, which date from the Eocene period. Owing to the lack of mineralization in many of the forest specimens, the traditional characterization of "fossilisation" fails for these forests and "mummification" may be a more precise description. The fossil records provide strong evidence that the Axel Heiberg forest was a high-latitude wetland forest. A holotype of the ammonite Otoceras gracile was found in the Griesbachian substage of the Induan age of the Early Triassic deposits of this island.

== History ==
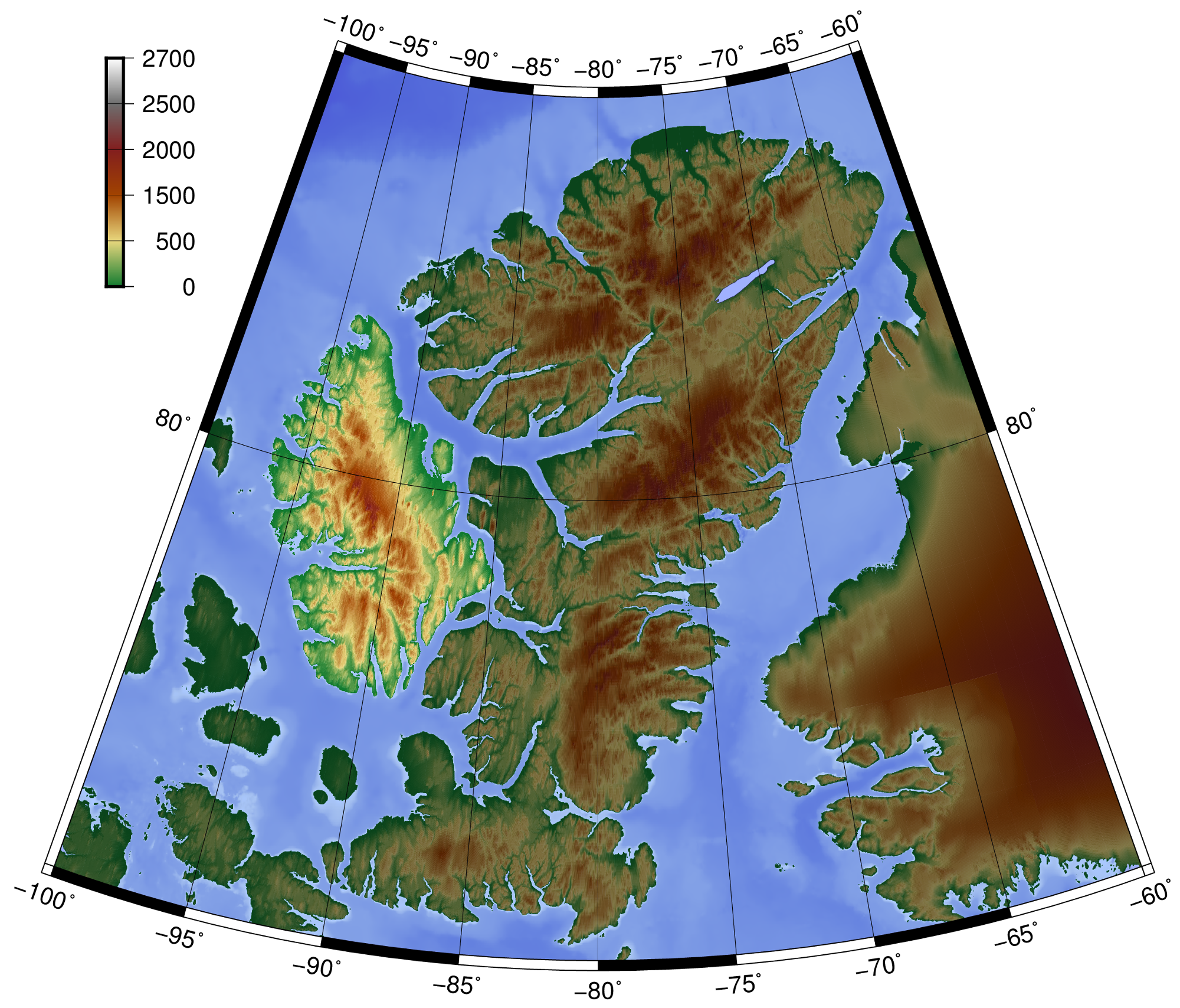
Topography of Axel Heiberg Island

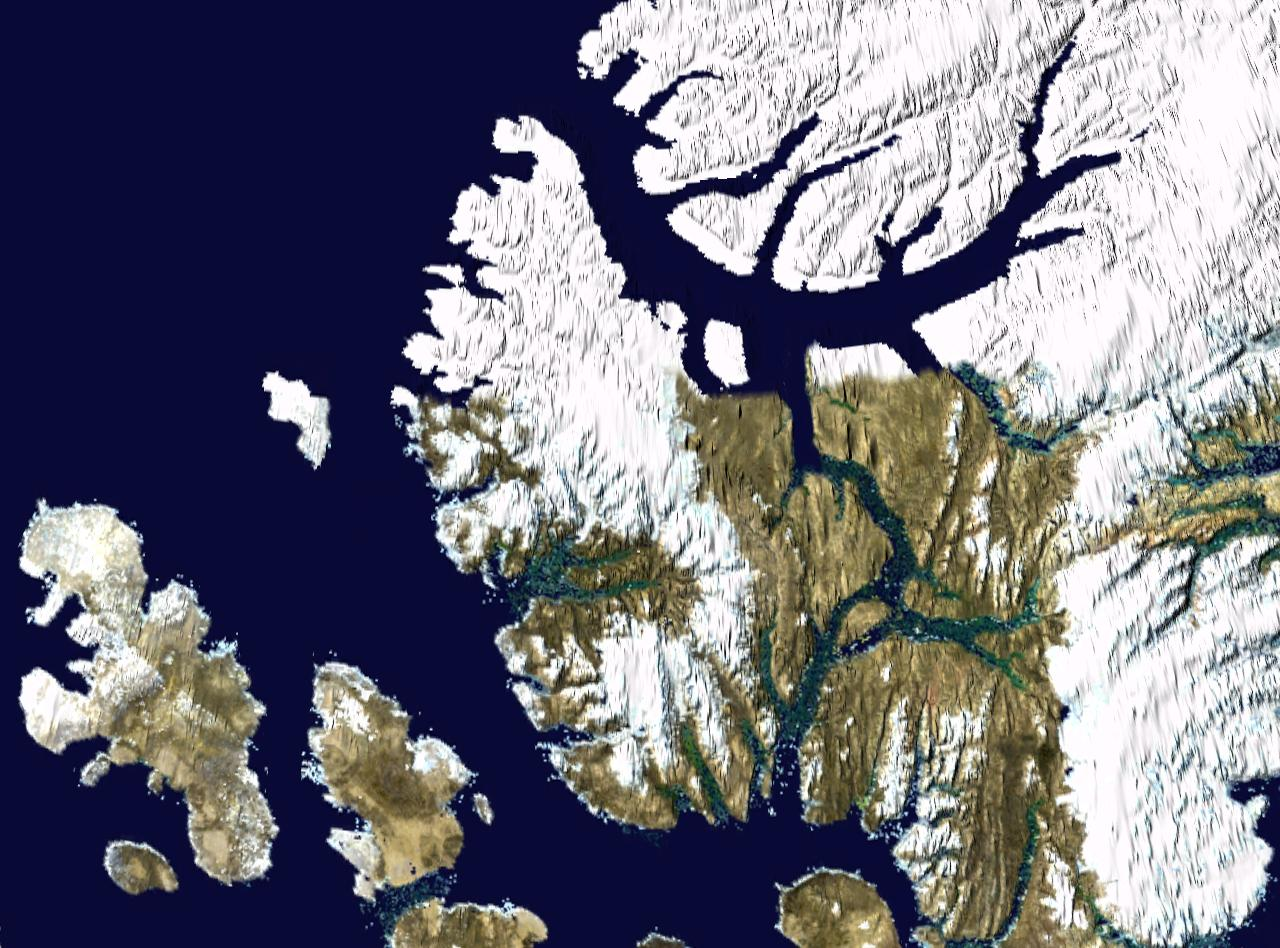
Satellite photo montage of Axel Heiberg Island

Axel Heiberg Island has been inhabited in the past by the Inuit, but was uninhabited by the time it was named by Otto Sverdrup, who explored it in 1900–01. He named it after Axel Heiberg, financial director of the Norwegian Ringnes brewery which sponsored the expedition. Other explorers visited the island during the early 20th century, during which time it was claimed by Norway until 1930. It is now part of Nunavut Territory, Canada. It was not until the late 1940s that the island was aerially photographed by the United States Army Air Forces' Operation Polaris. In 1955, two geologists of the Geological Survey of Canada, N.J. McMillan and Souther, traversed the interior as part of Operation Franklin. McMillan's observations of Bunde Glacier in northwest Axel Heiberg Island are the earliest glaciological observations on the ground to have found their way into a scientific publication. In 1959, scientists from McGill University explored Expedition Fiord (previously Sør Fjord or South Fiord) in central Axel Heiberg Island. This resulted in the establishment of the McGill Arctic Research Station (79°26′N 90°46′W), constructed 8 km (5.0 mi) inland from Expedition Fjord in 1960. It comprises a small research hut, a cookhouse, and two temporary structures comfortably accommodating 8–12 persons. The station was initially heavily utilized during the early 1960s, with a population of 20. The McGill Arctic Research Station is active from March to August, and research is currently focused on polar geomorphology, geology, glaciology, permafrost, climate change, and polar microbiology. Over the last 10–15 years, it has served as a significant Mars analogue for astrobiology investigations studying life and habitability of polar cryoenvironments and field-testing planetary exploration instrumentation platforms. In the summer of 1972, a British Army Mountaineering Association expedition resulted in the naming of Scaife Glacier following the accidental death of Sergeant Kenneth Scaife. During the summer of 1986, a Canadian expedition headed by Dr. James Basinger set out to investigate a very unusual fossil forest on Axel Heiberg. The findings of these and subsequent expeditions have since been popularly reported in Canada. Over 40 million years ago, during the Eocene epoch, a forest of tall trees flourished on Axel Heiberg Island. The trees reached up to 35 m (115 ft) in height; some may have grown for 500 to 1,000 years. The polar climate was warm at the time, but the winters were still continuously dark for three months. As the trees fell, the fine sediment in which the forest grew protected the plants. Instead of turning into petrified "stone" fossils, they were ultimately mummified by the cold, dry Arctic climate and only recently exposed to erosion. Scientists from the Komarov Botanical Institute of the Russian Academy of Sciences in Saint Petersburg provided a few grams of Metasequoia conifer wood from the site to genetics researchers at the National University of Altai, who compared the DNA sequences of the ancient wood with DNA of modern woody plants and found them to be almost identical. Komarov Institute scientists also discovered double-strand DNA molecules in Metasequoia fossil leaves from Axel Heiberg Island. As late as 1999, preserving this unique site was a concern, as the fossil wood was easily damaged and eroded once exposed. There were concerns that Arctic cruise ship tourists were taking wood and that the site was being disturbed by Canadian military helicopters from nearby bases and even by scientists in their studies. There were calls for more protection for the area. It has no official status, partly because land claims had to be settled. But now Nunavut is looking at how best to protect the fossil forest, possibly by setting up a territorial park to be called Napaaqtulik, "where there are trees". Interesting animal fossils have been discovered on the island, including a remarkably preserved specimen of an ancient Aurorachelys turtle and, identified in 2016, the humerus of a Tingmiatornis bird.

== Glaciation ==
White Glacier is a valley glacier occupying 38.7 km^{2} (14.9 sq mi) in the Expedition Fiord area of Axel Heiberg Island (79°30′N 090°50′W). It extends in elevation from 56 to 1,782 m (184 to 5,846 ft) above sea level, a range which, as noted by Dyurgerov (2002), is exceeded only by Devon Ice Cap in the world list of glaciers with measured mass balance. Ice thickness reaches or exceeds 400 m (1,300 ft). Its maximum extension in recent history, marking the glacier's advance in response to the cooling of the Little Ice Age, was reached not earlier than the late 18th century and probably at the beginning of the 20th century. There is evidence that the retreat of the terminus, previously at about 5 m (16 ft) per year, is decelerating (Cogley et al. 1996a; Cogley and Adams 2000). White Glacier has been the subject of many papers in the glaciological literature since 1960, e.g. Müller (1962) was the source of a now-classical diagram elaborating and illustrating the concept of "glacier facies".

== Population ==
The island is uninhabited except for the seasonal McGill Arctic Research Station operated by McGill University.

== Lost Hammer Spring ==
The Lost Hammer Spring, located in the central west region of the island (79°07′N 090°21′W) is the coldest and saltiest of all Arctic springs described to date. It is characterized by a perennial hypersaline (24%) discharge at subzero temperatures (~−5 °C (23 °F)) flowing to the surface through a hollow, 2 m (6 ft 7 in) high cone-shaped salt tufa structure. Continuous gas emissions from the spring indicate an underlying thermogenic methane source. Based on these properties, this spring is considered a significant astrobiology analogue site for possible habitats currently present on Mars and the cold moons Europa and Enceladus. Microbes have been found at this site that do not depend on organic material or oxygen but only on simple inorganic compounds. These inorganic compounds are present on Mars.

== Views of the island ==
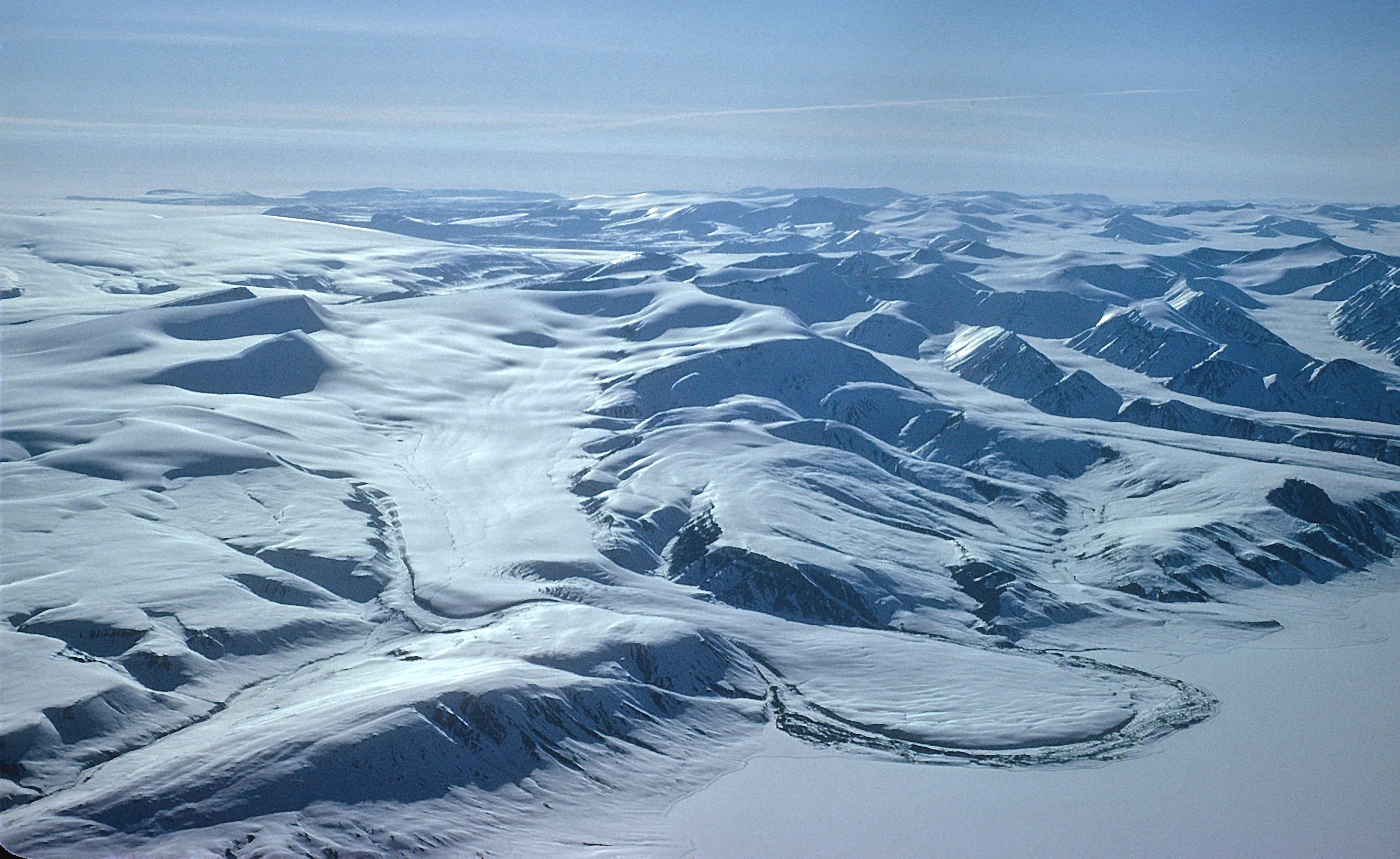
Glacier Fiord, Axel Heiberg Island. June 6, 1975.

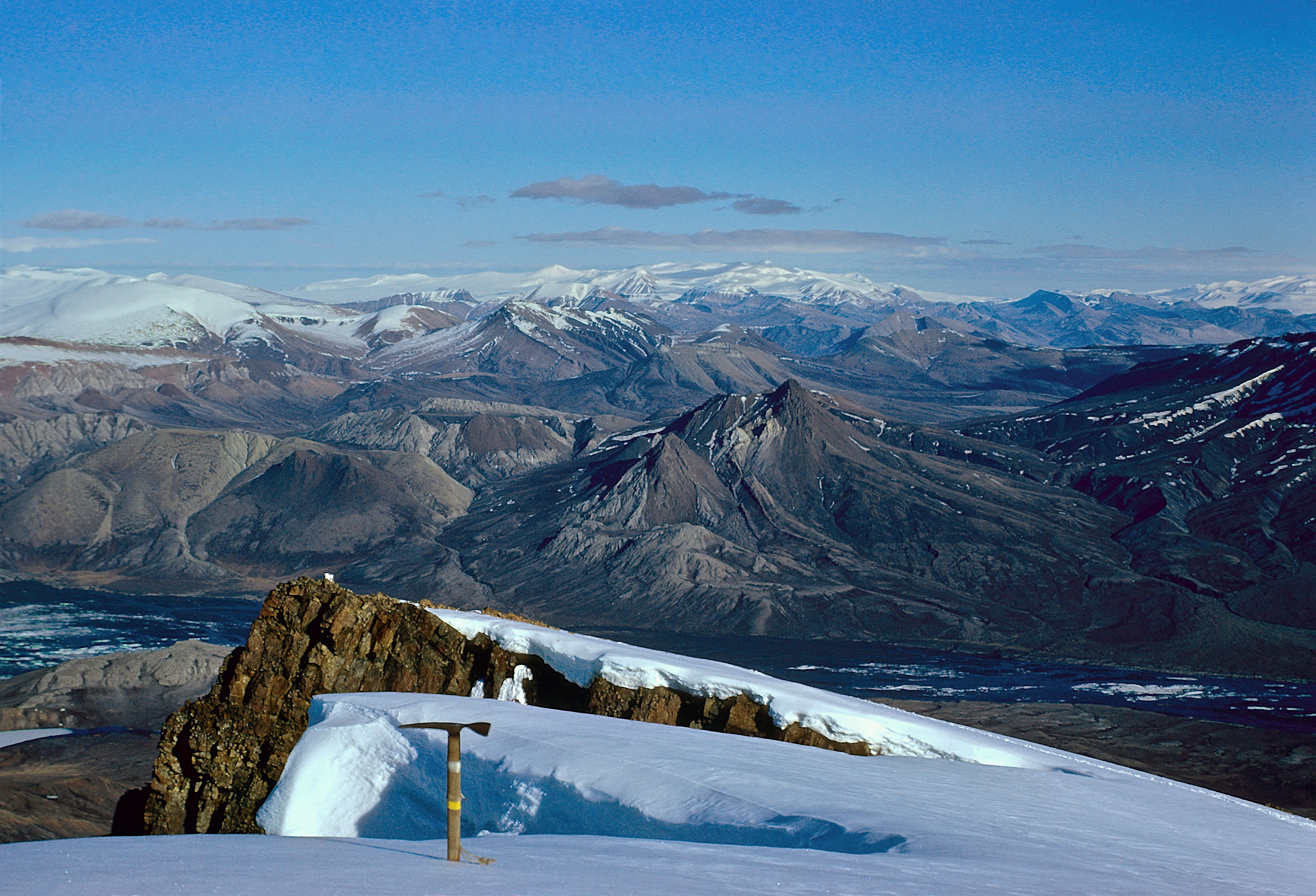
View from Wolf Mountain over the Expedition Valley towards southern Axel Heiberg Island. June 24, 1975.

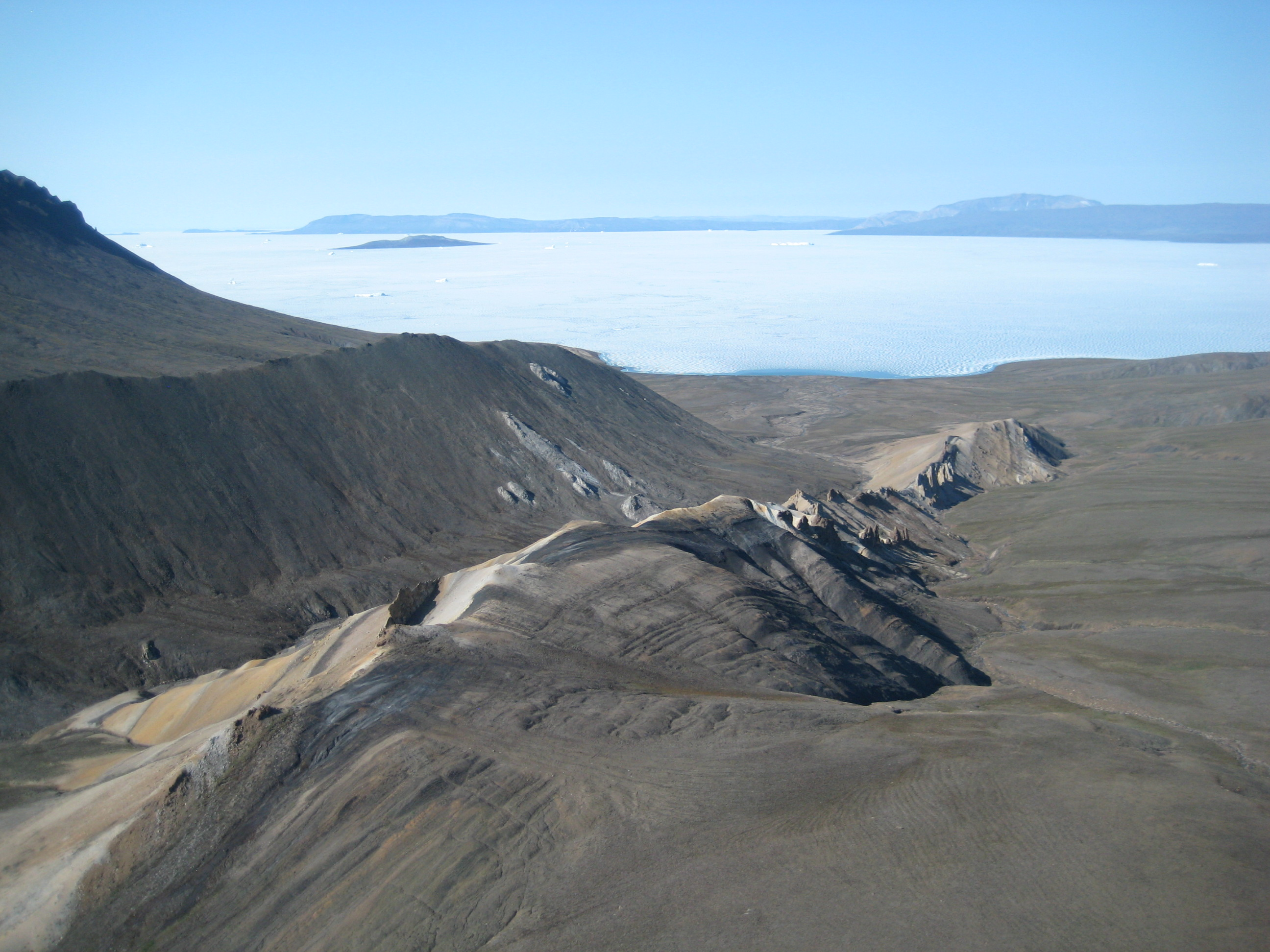
Outcrops on Axel Heiberg Island. July 2, 2012.

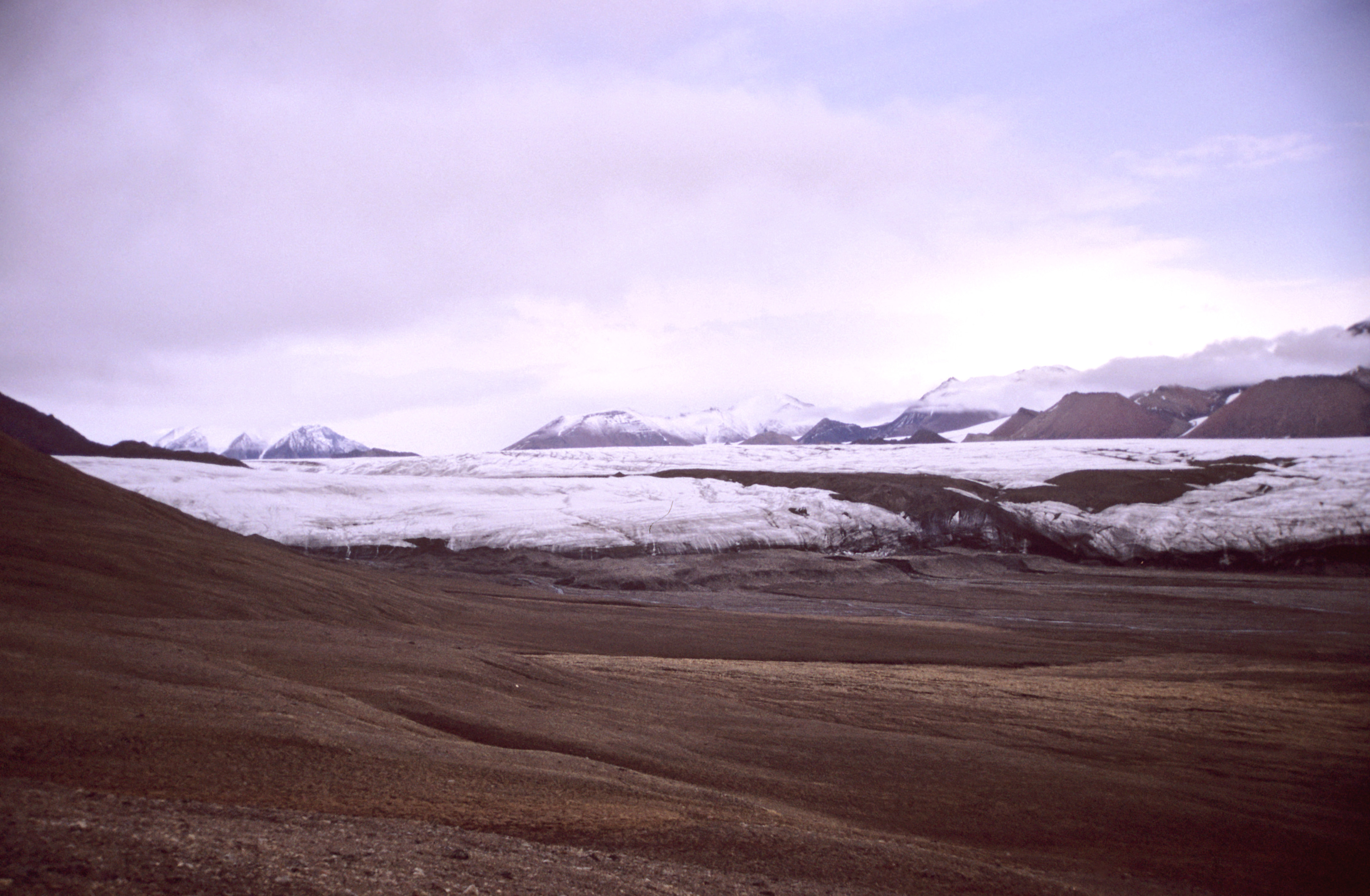
Axel Heiberg Island, Expedition Valley with White Glacier (left) and Thompson Glacier (right). July 3, 1988.

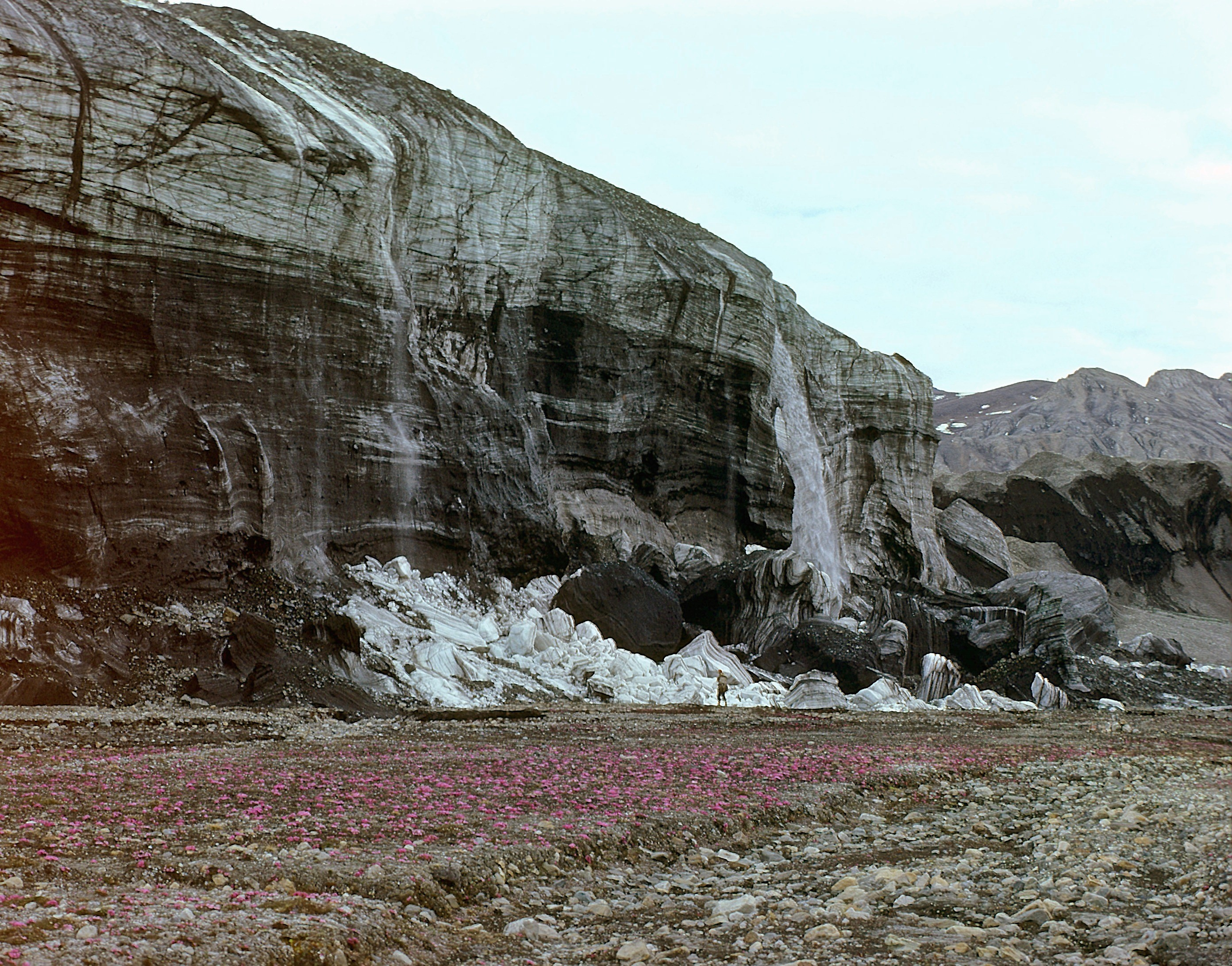
Front of advancing White Glacier, Axel Heiberg Island, June 23, 1975. The steep glacier front with waterfalls is caused by cold glacier ice, the ice cliff shows shear moraines with debris, part of the well-known Thompson Glacier with its push moraine at right. Foreground: vegetation cover of Saxifraga.

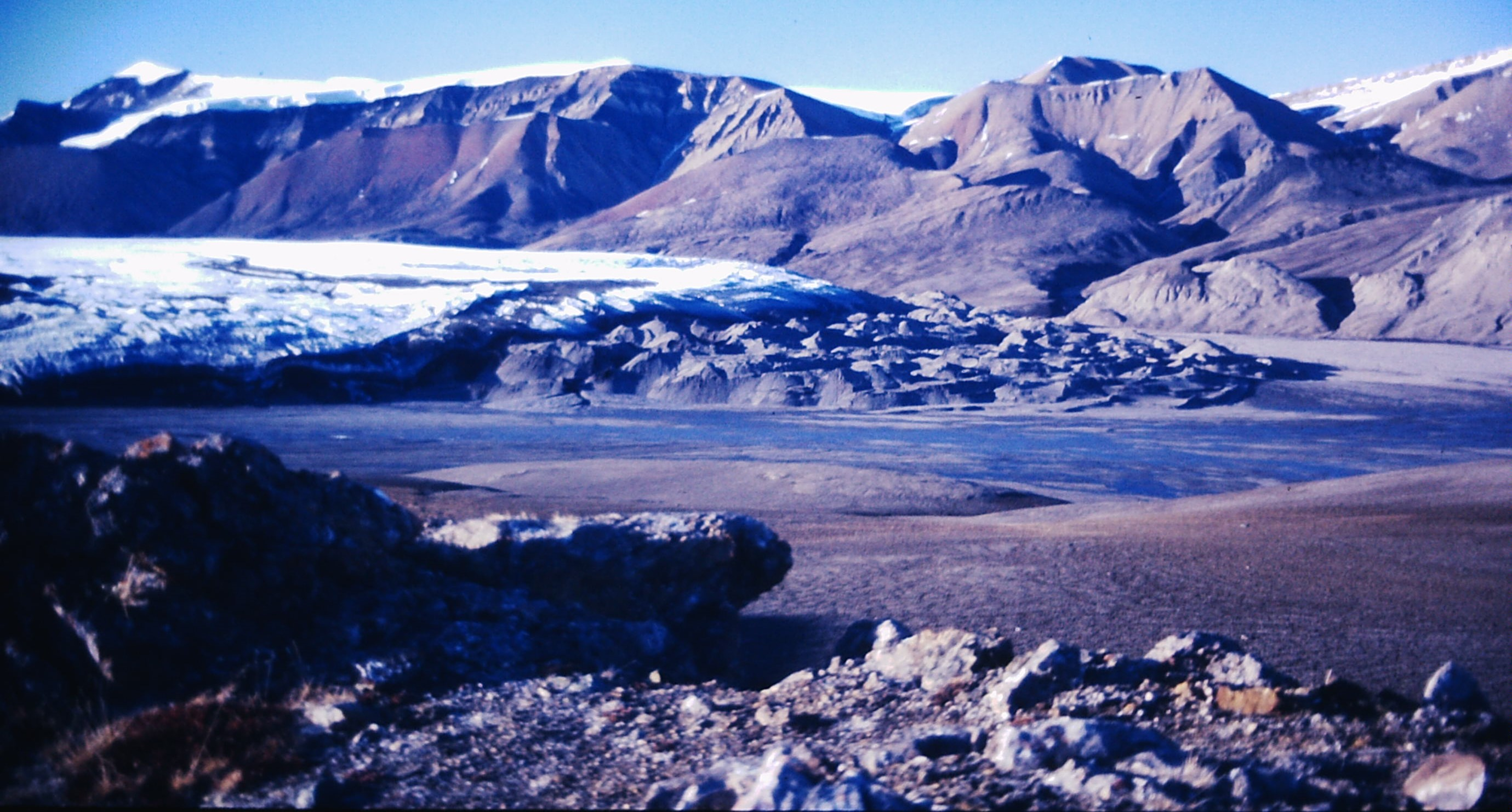
The active push moraine of Thompson glacier in July 1988

== See also ==
- Ellesmere Island Volcanics
