= List of islands in the Queen Elizabeth Islands =

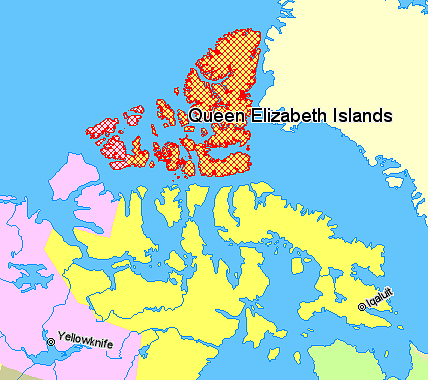
Queen Elizabeth Islands, northern Canada Nunavut Northwest Territories Quebec Greenland

This is a list of the islands that are named in the Queen Elizabeth Islands. They are divided into two major island groups: the Parry Islands and the Sverdrup Islands. The total area of the Queen Elizabeth Islands is about 419,000 square kilometres.

== List of islands ==
Island	Sub- group	Territory	Peak	Height m	Height ft	Area km^{2}	Area sq mi	Rank Canada	Rank world	Coordinates
Alexander	Parry	NU	average elevation	60–180	200–590	484	187	66		75°52′N 102°37′W
Amund Ringnes	Sverdrup	NU	ridge	265	869	5,255	2,029	25	111	77°53′N 095°30′W
Axel Heiberg	Sverdrup	NU	Outlook Peak	2,210	7,250	43,178	16,671	7	32	79°26′N 090°46′W
Baillie-Hamilton	Parry	NU		200	660	290	110	91		75°53′N 094°35′W
Bathurst	Parry	NU	Stokes Mountain	412	1,352	16,042	6,194	13	54	75°46′N 099°47′W
Borden	Parry	NU/NT		150	490	2,794	1,079	30	170	78°33′N 111°10′W
Brock	Parry	NT		67	220	764	295	58	383	77°51′N 114°27′W
Buckingham	Parry	NU	Mount Windsor	150	490	137	53	137		77°12′N 091°00′W
Byam Martin	Parry	NU		153	502	1,150	440	42	294	75°12′N 104°17′W
Cameron	Parry	NU	Mount Wilmot			1,059	409	46	312	77°48′N 101°51′W
Coburg	Parry	NU		800	2,600	411	159	83		75°57′N 079°18′W
Cornwall	Sverdrup	NU	McLeod Peak	400	1,300	2,358	910	31	184	77°37′N 094°52′W
Cornwallis	Parry	NU		343	1,125	6,995	2,701	21	96	75°05′N 095°00′W
Devon	Parry	NU	Devon Ice Cap	1,920	6,300	55,247	21,331	6	27	75°08′N 087°51′W
Eglinton	Parry	NT		200	660	1,541	595	36	249	75°46′N 118°27′W
Ellef Ringnes	Sverdrup	NU	Isachsen Dome	260	850	11,295	4,361	16	69	78°37′N 101°56′W
Ellesmere		NU	Barbeau Peak	2,616	8,583	196,236	75,767	3	10	80°10′N 079°05′W
Emerald Isle	Parry	NT		150	490	549	212	63	466	76°48′N 114°07′W
Graham	Sverdrup	NU		175	574	1,378	532	38	265	77°26′N 090°30′W
Griffith	Parry	NU				189	73	110		74°35′N 095°30′W
Helena	Parry	NU	average in southern hills	220	720	327	126	85		76°40′N 101°00′W
Hoved	Parry	NU				158	61	125		77°32′N 085°09′W
Île Vanier	Parry	NU		200	660	1,126	435	44	298	76°10′N 103°15′W
King Christian	Sverdrup	NU	King Christian Mountain	165	541	645	249	60	420	77°45′N 102°00′W
Little Cornwallis	Parry	NU				412	159	75		75°30′N 096°30′W
Lougheed	Parry	NU		60–110	200–360	1,308	505	41	273	77°24′N 105°15′W
Lowther	Parry	NU	raised beach	106.5	349	145	56	133		74°33′N 097°30′W
Mackenzie King	Parry	NU/NT	Castel Butte	300	980	5,048	1,949	26	115	77°43′N 111°57′W
Massey	Parry	NU		210	690	432	167	71		75°59′N 102°58′W
Meighen	Sverdrup	NU		260	850	955	369	50	337	79°59′N 099°30′W
Melville	Parry	NU/NT		776	2,546	42,149	16,274	8	33	75°30′N 111°30′W
North Kent	Parry	NU		600	2,000	590	230	62	453	76°40′N 090°15′W
Pim	Sverdrup	NU				83	32			78°44′N 074°25′W
Prince Patrick	Parry	NT		279	915	15,848	6,119	14	55	76°45′N 119°30′W
Stor	Sverdrup	NU		500	1,600	313	121	87		78°59′N 085°50′W
Ulvingen	Sverdrup	NU				87	34			78°18′N 088°35′W
Ward Hunt	Sverdrup	NU	Walker Hill	439	1,440	13.9	5.4			83°04′N 074°08′W
Queen Elizabeth		NU/NT	Barbeau Peak	2,616	8,583			...	...	78°05′N 095°10′W

== See also ==
- List of islands of Canada
- List of Canadian islands by area
