= Cape Ludwig =

Peninsula in Nunavut, Canada

Coordinates: 77.951°N 95.118°W

Cape Ludwig is a peninsula in Qikiqtaaluk Region, Nunavut, Canada. It is located on Amund Ringnes Island. Massey Sound is nearby, entered from Norwegian Bay between Cape Ludwig and Cape Southwest. Hendriksen Strait is to the southwest.
