= Exmouth (disambiguation) =

Exmouth is a town in Devon, England.

Exmouth may also refer to:

== Places ==
- Exmouth, Western Australia
- Shire of Exmouth, Western Australia
- Exmouth Island, Canadian Arctic Archipelago
- Exmouth Peninsula, Southern Chile

== People ==
- Viscount Exmouth, a title in the peerage of the United Kingdom
  - Edward Pellew, 1st Viscount Exmouth (1757–1833), a British naval officer

== Other uses ==
- Five ships of the British Royal Navy have been named HMS Exmouth
- Exmouth, a Magnolia grandiflora cultivar
