= Cape Southwest =

Headland in Nunavut, Canada

Coordinates: 78°12′N 92°02′W

Cape Southwest is a headland in Qikiqtaaluk Region, Nunavut, Canada. It is located on Amund Ringnes Island near Cape Ludwig, where Norwegian Bay enters Massey Sound. Cape Maundy Thursday is to the northwest.
