= Skrugar Point =

Peninsula in Nunavut, Canada

Coordinates: 78.768°N 93.834°W

Skrugar Point is a peninsula in Qikiqtaaluk Region, Nunavut, Canada. It is located on Amund Ringnes Island 40 miles (64 km) northwest of Cape Southwest. It rises to 290 metres (950 ft) above sea level and forms an entrance point to Sand Bay.
