= Svendsen Peninsula =

Peninsula in Nunavut, Canada

Svendsen Peninsula (77°45′N 84°0′W) is located on the southwestern coast of Ellesmere Island, a part of the Qikiqtaaluk Region of the Canadian territory of Nunavut. Much of it is shielded from Norwegian Bay by the Raanes Peninsula (northwest) and Bjorne Peninsula (southwest). Svendsen Peninsula is notable for its many fiords, including Trold, Baumann, and Vendom. Gryte Bay is in the west. Hoved Island lies offshore.
