= Table Island (disambiguation) =

Table Island may refer to:

- Table Island, Canadian Arctic Archipelago
- Table Island (Coco Islands)
- Table Island (青洲, Tsing Chau), an island of Hong Kong
- Table Island (South Shetland Islands)
