= Haig-Thomas Island =

Island in Nunavut, Canada

- Location within Nunavut Location within Canada

Geography
- Location: Massey Sound
- Coordinates: 78°15′N 094°30′W
- Archipelago: Sverdrup Islands; Queen Elizabeth Islands; Arctic Archipelago

Administration
- Canada
- Territory: Nunavut
- Region: Qikiqtaaluk

Demographics
- Population: Uninhabited

Haig-Thomas Island is one of the Sverdrup Islands in Qikiqtaaluk Region, Nunavut, Canada. It is located in Massey Sound, between Amund Ringnes Island and Axel Heiberg Island. It is also a member of the Queen Elizabeth Islands and the Arctic Archipelago. It is named for the British explorer David Haig-Thomas who charted it in 1938.
