= Ekins Island =

Island in Nunavut, Canada

- Location within Nunavut Location within Canada

Geography
- Location: Northern Canada
- Coordinates: 77°9′N 95°48′W
- Archipelago: Queen Elizabeth Islands; Arctic Archipelago
- Area: 6 km^{2} (2.3 sq mi)

Administration
- Canada
- Territory: Nunavut

Demographics
- Population: Uninhabited

Ekins Island is an uninhabited island within the Arctic Archipelago in the territory of Nunavut. It lies in Norwegian Bay, north of Devon Island, and is also south of Cornwall Island, separated by Belcher Channel. Table Island is located about 4 km (2.5 mi) to the northeast.
