= Cape Levvel =

Peninsula in Nunavut, Canada

Coordinates: 78.985°N 94.334°W

Cape Levvel is a peninsula in Qikiqtaaluk Region, Nunavut, Canada. It is located on Amund Ringnes Island by Strand Bay. From steep cliffs, it rises to 120 metres (390 ft) above sea level.
