= Belcher Channel =

Coordinates: 77°14′59″N 094°59′59″W

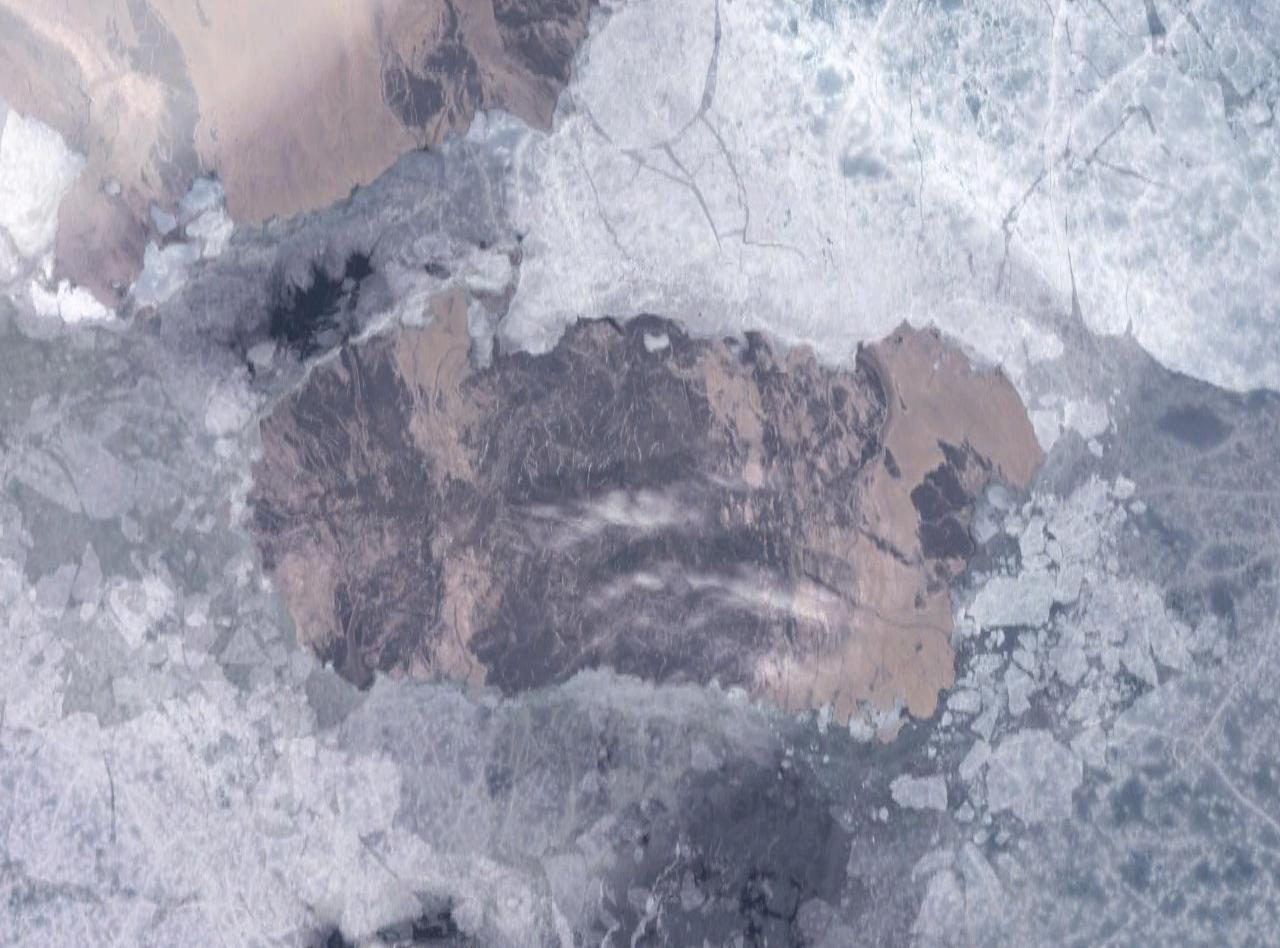
Wfm cornwall island

Belcher Channel is a waterway in Norwegian Bay in the Canadian territory of Nunavut. It separates Cornwall Island from Devon Island. Table Island and Ekins Island lie within the channel.

== See also ==
- Belcher Channel Formation
