= Ulvingen Island =

Island in Nunavut, Canada

- Location within Nunavut Location within Canada

Geography
- Location: Norwegian Bay
- Coordinates: 78°20′N 088°12′W
- Archipelago: Sverdrup Islands; Queen Elizabeth Islands; Arctic Archipelago
- Area: 87 km^{2} (34 sq mi)

Administration
- Canada
- Territory: Nunavut
- Region: Qikiqtaaluk

Demographics
- Population: Uninhabited

Ulvingen Island is one of the uninhabited islands in Qikiqtaaluk Region, Nunavut, Canada. It is located in Norwegian Bay between Axel Heiberg Island and Ellesmere Island's Raanes Peninsula. It is a member of the Sverdrup Islands, Queen Elizabeth Islands, and the Arctic Archipelago. Hare Point (78°14′03″N 088°20′27″W) is situated at the island's southern tip.
