= David Haig-Thomas =

British ornithologist, wildlife photographer, explorer and rower

- Born: 1 December 1908; London, England
- Died: 6 June 1944 (aged 35); Normandy
- Cause of death: Killed in action during the Normandy Landings
- Education: St John's College, Cambridge
- Occupations: ornithologist, wildlife photographer, explorer and rower
- Children: 2

David Haig-Thomas (1 December 1908 – 6 June 1944) was a British ornithologist, wildlife photographer, explorer, and rower who competed for Great Britain in the 1932 Summer Olympics. He was an army commando during the Second World War and was killed in action during the Normandy Landings. Haig-Thomas Island in the Canadian Arctic is named after him.

== Biography ==
Haig-Thomas was born in London and educated at Eton College and St John's College, Cambridge. In 1930, 1931, and 1932 he was bowman of the winning Cambridge boats in the Boat Race. He was also the bow of the eight that came fourth rowing for Great Britain at the 1932 Summer Olympics, and rowing correspondent of the Daily Mail. Haig-Thomas married Nancy Catherine Bury, daughter of Major Lindsay Edward Bury. They had two sons.

Initially a hunter with catapult and gun, he became an ornithologist and took up bird photography. His articles and photographs were published in Country Life and The Field.

== Expeditions ==
In 1933 he went on an expedition to Abyssinia with his school contemporary Wilfred Thesiger to trace the route of the Awash River. In 1934, he was the ornithologist on the Oxford University Ellesmere Land Expedition which was organised by Edward Shackleton with the main purpose of exploring northern Ellesmere Island and to map its coastline. The expedition was led by Gordon Noel Humphreys who was head surveyor. Other members of the expedition were Shackleton, photographer and biologist A. W. Moore (sometimes listed as Morris), H. W. Stallworthy of the Royal Canadian Mounted Police, and geologist R. Bentham. With their Greenland Inuit guides, Inutuk and Nukapinguaq, they set up camp at Etah, Greenland in 1934. After wintering Greenland in 1934–1935, they sledged across Smith Sound and Ellesmere Island and in spring 1935. By the end of May 1935, the group had returned to Etah and reached England in late September the same year.

In 1936, Haig-Thomas led an ornithological expedition to Iceland. From 1937 to 1938, he led a British Arctic Expedition in northwest Greenland and Ellesmere Island, accompanied by John Wright and Richard Hamilton. The expedition arrived at Qaanaaq in northwest Greenland in August 1937. They left Etah in March 1938 and crossed Ellesmere Island where they met up with the MacGregor Arctic Expedition. They then sledged to Amund Ringnes Island, Axel Heiberg Island and Haig-Thomas Island in the Canadian Arctic. They returned to Greenland and spent the summer of 1938 in Qaanaaq. Haig-Thomas's collection of Arctic objects from Greenland and northern Canada was donated in two instalments to the British Museum.

== Second World War ==
Haig-Thomas purchased Horsey Island in 1939 and lived there until called up to serve in the Second World War.

Shortly after the outbreak of the war, he was commissioned as a second lieutenant in the Royal Army Service Corps on 2 March 1940. He then served in Iceland and East Greenland. In 1942, he was part of Special Commando Boating Group, No. 14 Commando which was made up of Canadians and Norwegians. As well as Haig-Thomas, this included other polar explorers including Sir Peter Scott, Andrew Croft, August Courtauld and others. They specialized in using canoes and kayaks for limpet attacks in arctic waters. In 1944 in Operation Overlord he was in C Troop, No. 4 Commando. He was killed in action on D-Day in Normandy aged 35 and is buried in the churchyard in the village of Bavent.

== Publications ==
- Haig-Thomas, David "I Leap Before I Look", London, William Clowes & Sons, 1936
- Haig-Thomas, David Expedition to Ellesmere Island, 1937–38. Geographical Journal, 1940, 95(4):265–277.
- Haig-Thomas, David Tracks in the Snow London: Hodder & Stoughton 1939

== See also ==
- List of Cambridge University Boat Race crews
