= Horsey Island =

Tidal island in Essex, England

Coordinates: 51.876°N 1.245°E

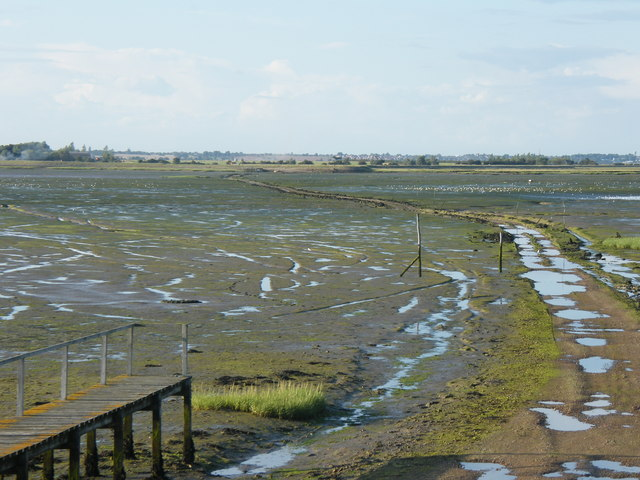
Island Lane leading across the Wade to Horsey Island

Horsey Island is an island in the parish of Thorpe-le-Soken, Essex. It lies in Hamford Water and is part of the Hamford Water National Nature Reserve, managed by Natural England. Permission is required to visit.

== Geography ==
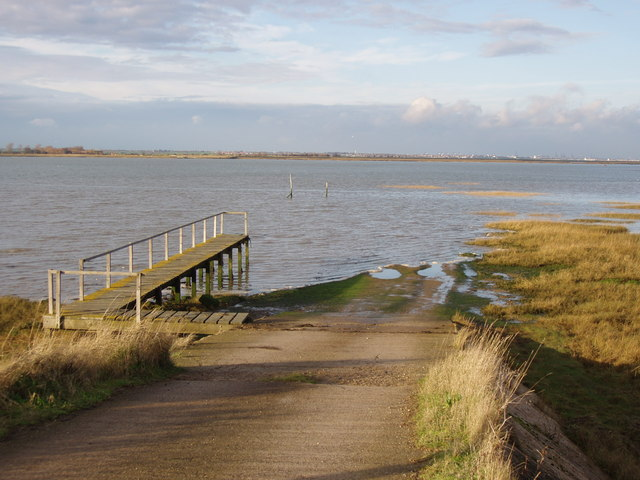
At high tide

The western section of the island contains a freshwater pool surrounded by trees. At one point boats could moor here, but this is now discouraged. There are oyster beds along here and the north edge of the island. In the centre of the island are a number of farm buildings. In the 19th century, a large section of land was reclaimed, with sea walls constructed. Along with extensive saltings surrounding the island, this offered some protection against flooding. At this time, Horsey Island partially connected to the neighbouring Hedge End Island; this was part of a plan to completely join the two islands together that was never completed owing to financial difficulties.

The island is linked to the mainland by a 0.66-mile (1.06 km) causeway across a stretch of water known as the Wade, leading from the nearest village, Kirby-le-Soken, that can be walked with care at low tide. It is one of 43 (unbridged) tidal islands that can be accessed on foot from mainland Great Britain.

== Settlements ==
The earliest known record of Horsey Island dates from 1212, when it was known as "Horse Hey". It has been intermittently inhabited, with evidence of buildings dating back to 1536 and appearing on a map in 1594 as Horsey Illande. The local geography has meant Horsey Island has been regularly susceptible to flooding, including severe floods in 1691, 1896, 1949 and the North Sea flood of 1953. The 19th-century sea wall was destroyed by floods around 1897, and the surrounding land was abandoned.

Explorer and author David Haig-Thomas purchased the island in 1939 and lived there until called up to serve in the Second World War. He was killed in action on D-Day, 6 June 1944.

The Wade was repaired after the 1953 flood. The farm is still in active use, thus making it one of the most easterly inhabited islands in Britain, a claim sometimes attributed to the more built-up Mersea Island further west. It remains privately owned.

== Cultural references ==
The island features in Arthur Ransome's children's novel Secret Water as "Swallow Island". The south eastern edge of the island is rich in birdlife and this inspired Paul Gallico to film the BBC's adaptation of his book The Snow Goose there.

The BBC show Top Gear visited Horsey Island at the end of a segment in series 28, episode 1, where presenters Paddy McGuinness, Freddie Flintoff and Chris Harris attempted to cross the causeway in cheap convertibles.
