= Cape Maundy Thursday =

Headland in Nunavut, Canada

Coordinates: 78.468°N 92.984°W

Cape Maundy Thursday is an ice-capped headland in Qikiqtaaluk Region, Nunavut, Canada. It is located on Amund Ringnes Island 21 miles (34 km) northwest of Cape Southwest. Cape Maundy Thursday rises to 845 metres (2,772 ft) above sea level.
