= Graham Island (disambiguation) =

Graham Island may refer to:

- Graham Island, British Columbia, Canada
- Graham Island (Nunavut), arctic island in Nunavut, Canada
- Graham Island (Mediterranean Sea), submerged island in the Mediterranean Sea
- Graham Island, one of the Wessel Islands off the Northern Territory of Australia

== See also ==
- Graham Land
