= Cornwall Island (Nunavut) =

Uninhabited Canadian Arctic island

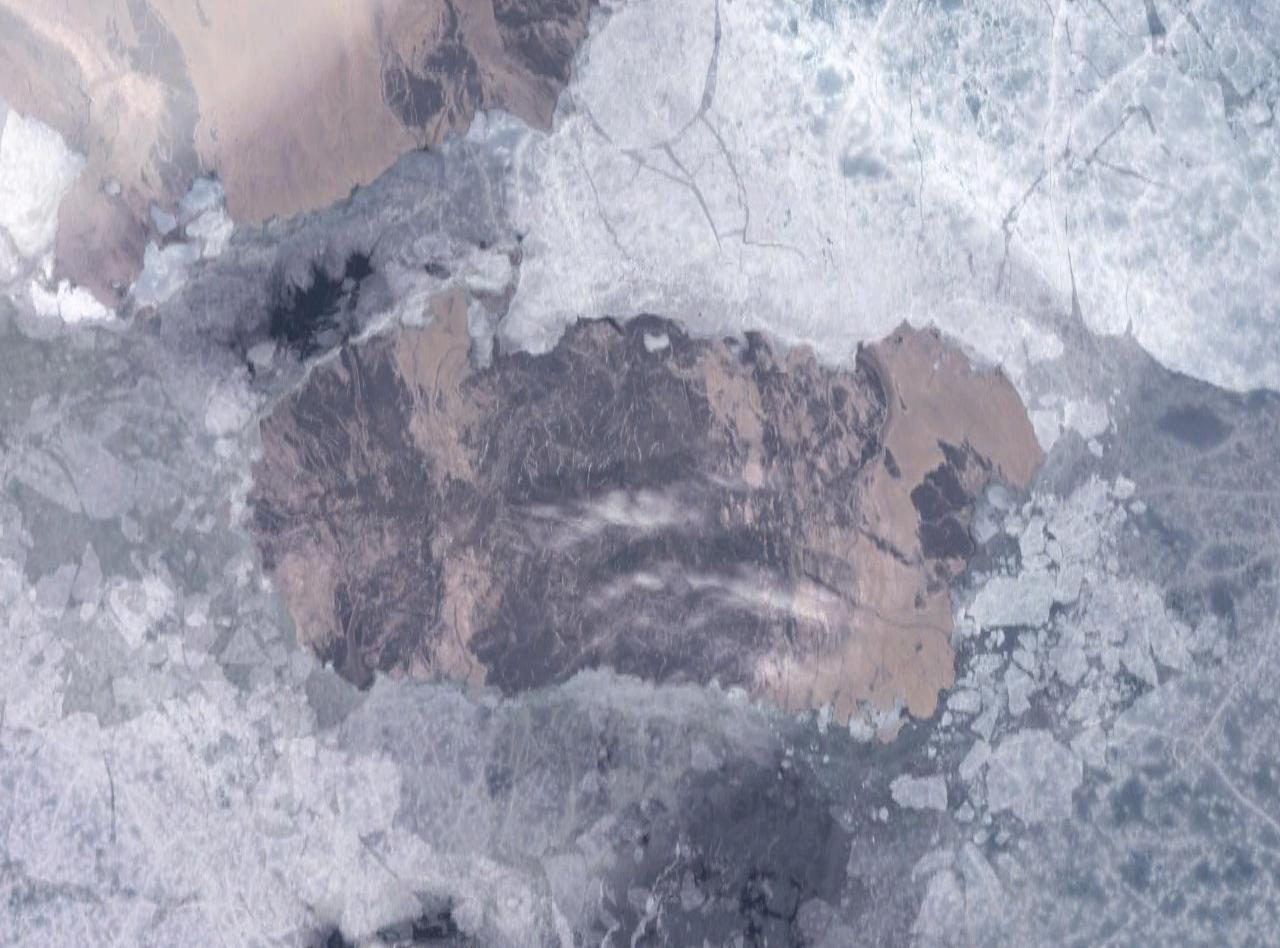
- NASA Landsat photo of Cornwall Island

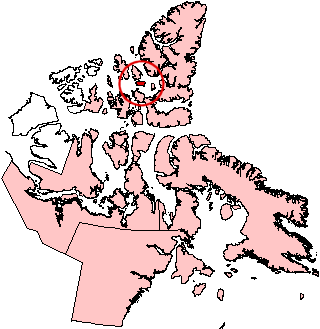
- Cornwall Island, Nunavut

Geography
- Location: Northern Canada
- Coordinates: 77°37′N 094°38′W
- Archipelago: Queen Elizabeth Islands; Arctic Archipelago
- Area: 2,265.48 km^{2} (874.71 sq mi) (2026)
- Area rank: 34th in Canada & 194th worldwide
- Length: 90 km (56 mi)
- Width: 30 km (19 mi)
- Highest elevation: 400 m (1300 ft)
- Highest point: McLeod Head

Administration
- Canada
- Territory: Nunavut

Demographics
- Population: Uninhabited

Cornwall Island is a small, uninhabited island in the high Arctic region of the Canadian territory of Nunavut. It is near the geometric centre of the Queen Elizabeth Islands. To the north, it is separated from Amund Ringnes Island by Hendriksen Strait. To the south, it is separated from Devon Island by Belcher Channel. It is the largest of six islands (the others being Buckingham, Ekins, Exmouth, Graham Island, and Table) in Norwegian Bay, west of Ellesmere Island. Cornwall Island measures about 90 km (56 mi) long and 30 km (19 mi) wide, and has an area of 2,265.48 km^{2} (874.71 sq mi), making it the 34th largest island in Canada and the 194th worldwide.

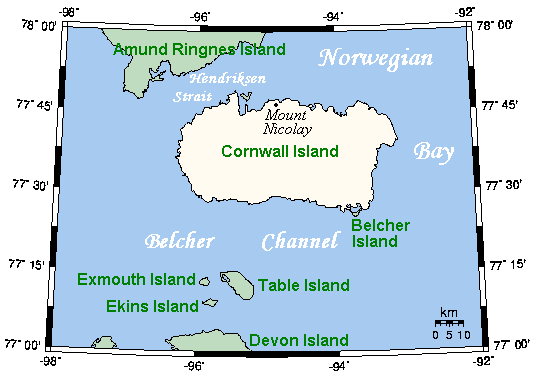
Closeup of Cornwall Island

The tallest peaks are McLeod Head at 400 m (1,300 ft), and Mount Nicolay at 290 m (950 ft), both on the north coast. Coast features include Northeast Point and Gordon Head to the east; Pell Point and Cape O'Brien to the south; and Cape Butler in the southwest. The first known European sighting of the island was by Sir Edward Belcher on 30 August 1852, and was named in honour of Prince Edward, Prince of Wales and Duke of Cornwall.
