= Eglinton Island =

Uninhabited island in the Northwest Territories, Canada

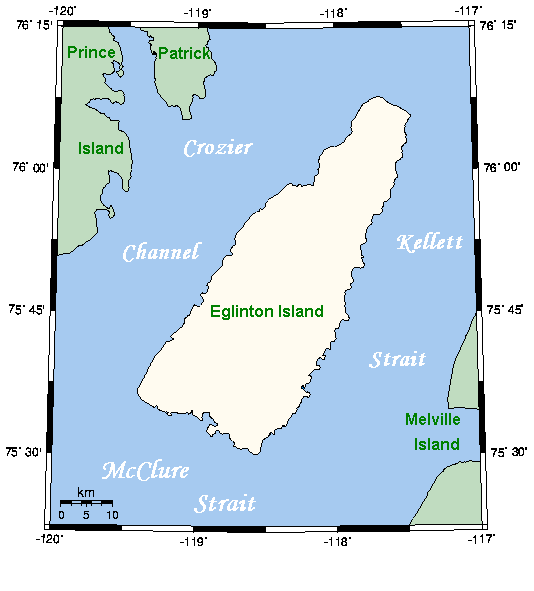
- Closeup of Eglinton Island

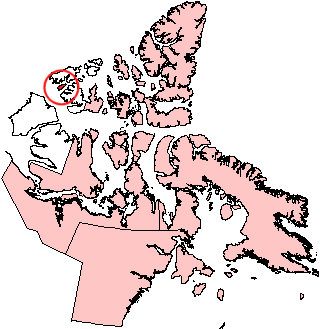
- Eglinton Island, Northwest Territories

- Location in the Northwest Territories Location in Canada

Geography
- Location: Northern Canada
- Coordinates: 75°46′N 118°27′W
- Archipelago: Queen Elizabeth Islands; Arctic Archipelago
- Area: 1,538.91 km^{2} (594.18 sq mi) (2026)
- Area rank: 39th in Canada & 254th worldwide
- Length: 73 km (45.4 mi)
- Width: 44 km (27.3 mi)

Administration
- Canada
- Territory: Northwest Territories

Demographics
- Population: Uninhabited

Eglinton Island is an uninhabited island of the Arctic Archipelago in the Northwest Territories, Canada. Eglinton is one of the Queen Elizabeth Islands. Located at 75°46′N 118°27′W, it measures 1,538.91 km^{2} (594.18 sq mi) in size, 73 km (45 mi) long and 44 km (27 mi) wide in measurements. It lies on the north side of the M'Clure Strait, just south of the much larger Prince Patrick Island and is uninhabited with some human activity in the 1970s in the form of natural gas drilling. The first European sighting of Eglinton Island was in 1853 by George Mecham, and explored by him and Francis Leopold McClintock in the spring of that year.

== Image gallery ==
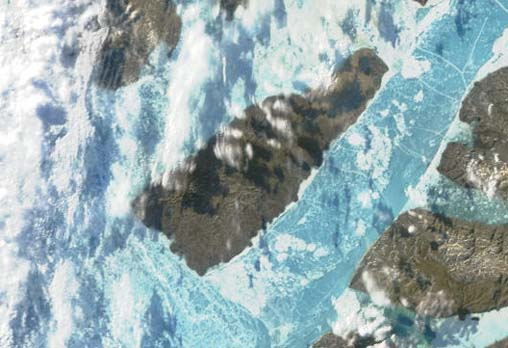
Terra/MODIS satellite image of Eglinton Island

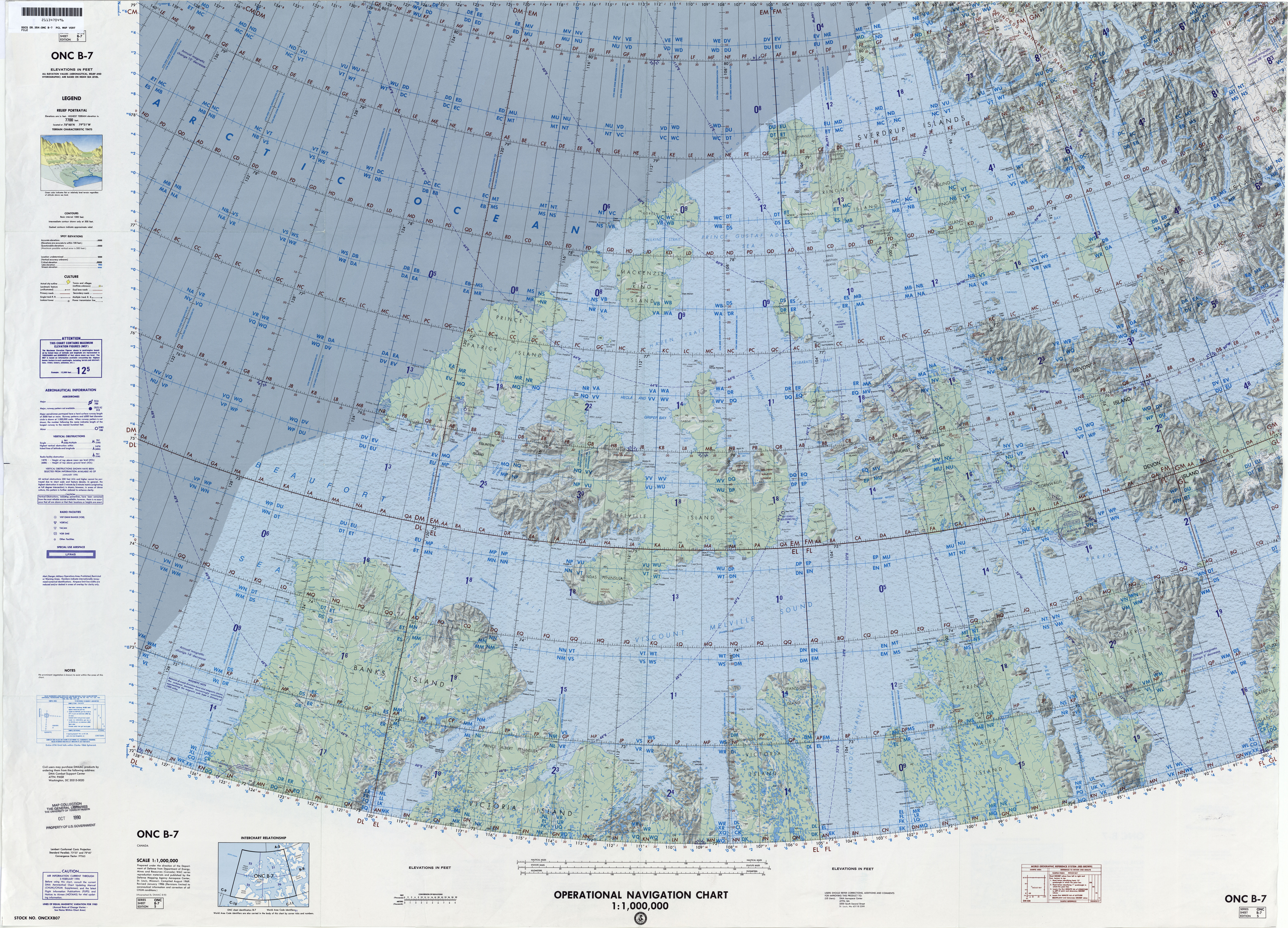
Map including Eglinton Island
