= Table Island =

Island in Nunavut, Canada

- Location within Nunavut Location within Canada

Geography
- Location: Northern Canada
- Coordinates: 77°13′N 95°26′W
- Archipelago: Queen Elizabeth Islands; Arctic Archipelago
- Area: 61.83 km^{2} (23.87 sq mi)
- Length: 13.84 km (8.6 mi)
- Width: 7.56 km (4.698 mi)
- Coastline: 38.92 km (24.184 mi)

Administration
- Canada
- Territory: Nunavut
- Region: Qikiqtaaluk

Demographics
- Population: 0

Table Island is an uninhabited island within the Arctic Archipelago in the territory of Nunavut. It lies in Norwegian Bay, north of Devon Island, and is also south Cornwall Island, separated by Belcher Channel. Ekins Island is a small islet about 4 km (2.5 mi) to the southwest.
