= George Mecham =

Irish naval officer and explorer

- Born: George Frederick Mecham; 14 November 1827; Cove of Cork, Ireland
- Died: 17 February 1858 (aged 30); Honolulu, Kingdom of Hawaiʻi
- Military career
- Branch: Royal Navy
- Service years: 1841–1858
- Rank: Commander
- Commands: HMS Salamander (1832); HMS Vixen (1841)

George Frederick Mecham (14 November 1827 – 17 February 1858) was an Irish naval officer and explorer who participated in the search for Franklin's lost expedition.

== Life ==
George Frederick Mecham was born in 1827 at Cove of Cork, Ireland.

He joined the Royal Navy in 1841 and was promoted to lieutenant on 8 March 1849. As a lieutenant he served from 1850 to 1852 in Assistance under Erasmus Ommanney and from 1852 to 1854 in Resolute under Henry Kellett, both of whom were searching for the lost expedition of Sir John Franklin.

Mecham was the first European to discover Prince Patrick and Eglinton Islands in 1853, both of which he charted in the spring of that year. He was promoted to commander on 21 October 1854 and commanded the paddle sloop HMS Salamander on the west coast of Africa from 1855 to 1857, and the paddle sloop HMS Vixen in the Pacific from 1857.

Mecham died of bronchitis on 17 February 1858 at Honolulu.
