= Bjorne Peninsula =

Peninsula in Nunavut, Canada

Coordinates: 77°37′N 086°59′W

The Bjorne Peninsula is located on the western coast of Ellesmere Island, a part of the Qikiqtaaluk Region of the Canadian territory of Nunavut. It protrudes northwest into Norwegian Bay from the island's mainland. Goose Point, a narrow isthmus, is the furthest northwest landform. Other areas of the peninsula include Schei Point (north), Little Bear Cape (west), and Great Bear Cape (southwest). The peninsula's midsection is approximately 144 m (472 ft) above sea level.

Muskox frequent the peninsula.

Nearby, Graham Island is found to the west and Axel Heiberg Island is to the northwest. Hoved Island lies between the peninsula and Ellesmere Island's mainland.
