= Buckingham Island =

Island in Nunavut, Canada

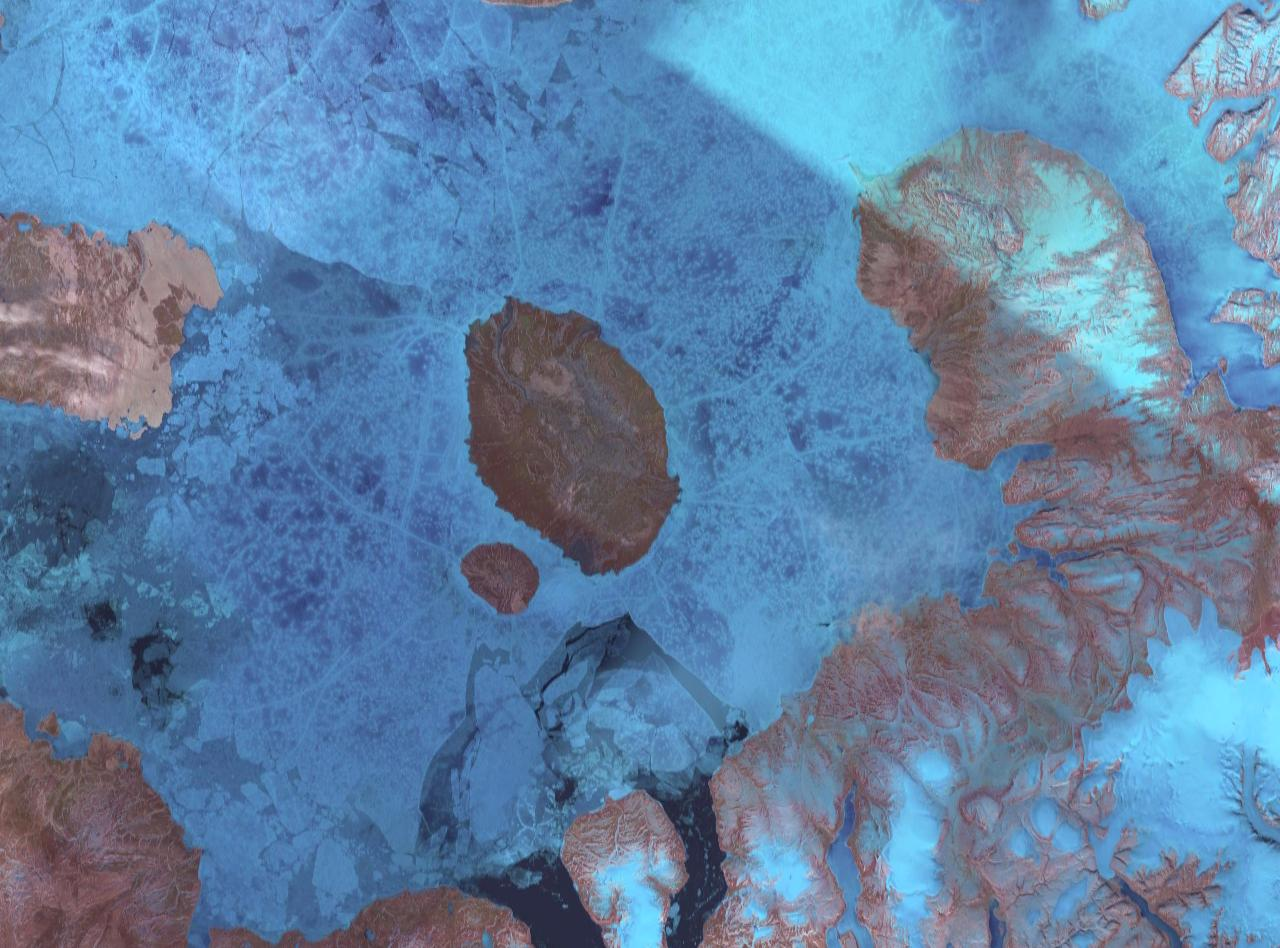
- Satellite picture of Buckingham among other islands

- Location within Nunavut Location within Canada

Geography
- Location: Northern Canada
- Coordinates: 77°12′N 91°00′W
- Archipelago: Queen Elizabeth Islands; Arctic Archipelago
- Area: 137 km^{2} (53 sq mi)
- Length: 14 km (8.7 mi)
- Width: 10 km (6 mi)
- Highest elevation: 150 m (490 ft)
- Highest point: Mount Windsor

Administration
- Canada
- Territory: Nunavut

Demographics
- Population: Uninhabited

Buckingham Island is a Canadian arctic island located in Norwegian Bay in the Canadian territory of Nunavut. The island lies immediately southwest of Graham Island and 50 km (31 mi) east of Cornwall Island. Buckingham Island is 10 km (6.2 mi) wide and has an area of 137 km^{2} (53 sq mi). It is a part of the Queen Elizabeth Islands.

Its highest peak is named Mount Windsor. Both the peak and the island itself are named after royal palaces. Capt. Edward Belcher, searching for John Franklin in 1852–1854, described the island's surrounds:

"The heavy, even solid nature of the floe surrounding, or, where 'nipped,' the almost berg-like lumps that protruded, afforded a fair inference that the sea is seldom seriously disturbed in these latitudes : on the other hand, if we take into consideration the exuviae of whales and other animals, found at every elevation, even to the summits of hills above 800 feet; the extraordinary wear or abrasion of the outlines, which nothing we have experienced could effect, it almost leads one to imagine that nature at some moment, possibly past and for ever, fatally perhaps for those we seek, has piled up layer over layer to effect what otherwise nothing but a recent deluge could account for."(Belcher, 1855)
