= HMS Salamander (1832) =

Sloop of the Royal Navy

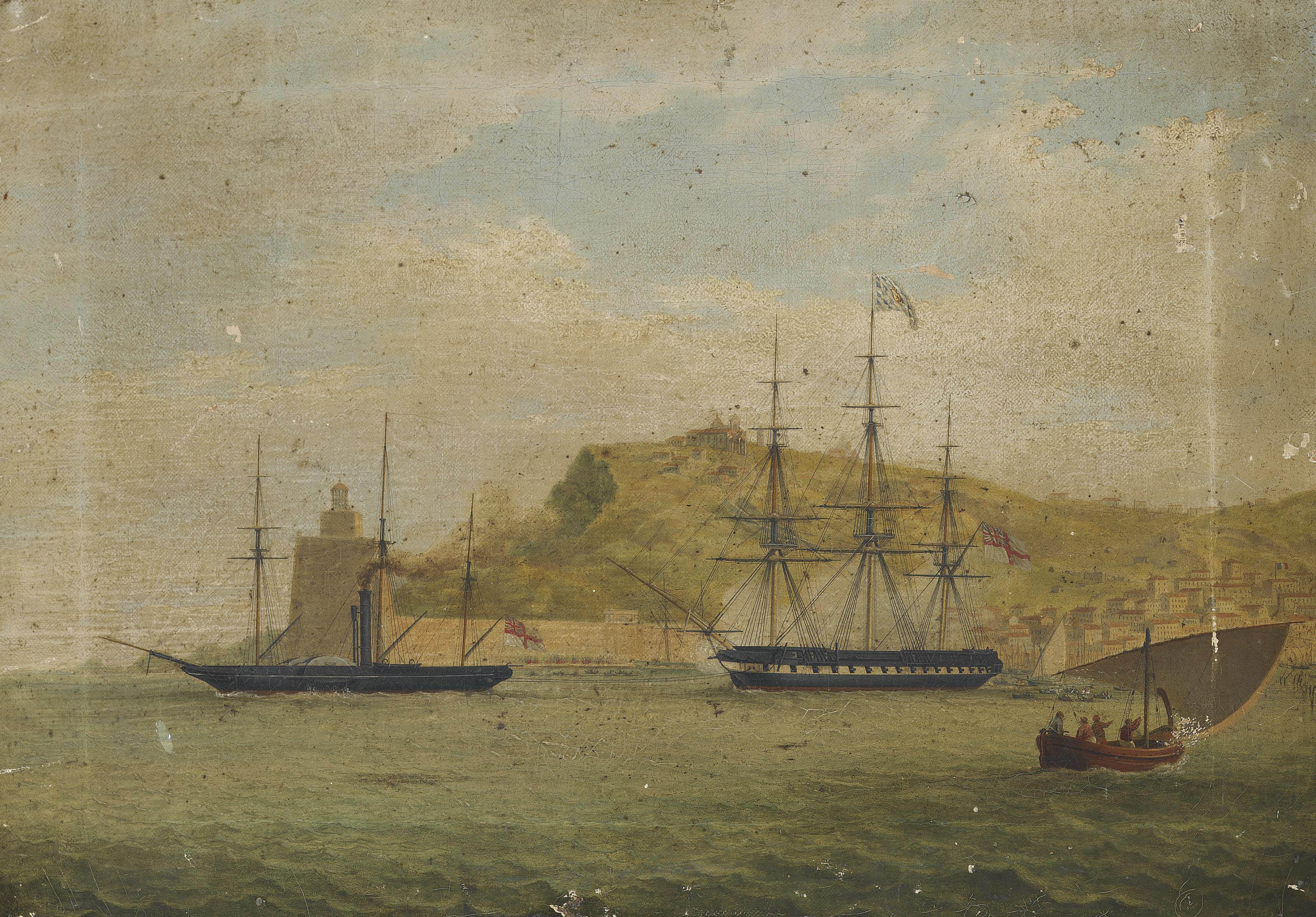
- Paddle steamer HMS Salamander towing a frigate out of Corunna, Spain, by Joseph Schranz

History

United Kingdom
- Name: HMS Salamander
- Namesake: Salamander
- Ordered: 12 January 1831
- Builder: Sheerness Dockyard
- Cost: £34,334
- Laid down: April 1831
- Launched: 14 May 1832
- Completed: 12 February 1833
- Commissioned: 27 November 1832
- Honours and awards: Second Burmese War 1852
- Fate: Broken up at Sheerness in 1883

General characteristics
- Type: Paddle sloop
- Displacement: 1,014 tons
- Tons burthen: 818 bm
- Length: 175 ft 5 in (53.5 m) gundeck; 151 ft 8.25 in (46.2 m) keel for tonnage
- Beam: 32 ft 2 in (9.8 m) maximum; 31 ft 10 in (9.7 m) for tonnage
- Draught: 12 ft 6 in (3.8 m) (forward); 13 ft 6 in (4.1 m) (aft)
- Depth of hold: 17 ft (5.2 m)
- Propulsion: 220 nominal horsepower; 506 ihp (377 kW); 2-cylinder side lever steam engine; Paddles
- Sail plan: Schooner rig, later changed to barquentine
- Speed: 7.2 knots (13.3 km/h) (under steam)
- Complement: 135
- Armament: 2 × 10-inch (84 cwt) pivot guns; 2 (later 4) × 32-pounder (25 cwt) guns; 1862 1 x 110 pounder

HMS Salamander was one of the initial steam powered vessels built for the Royal Navy. On 10 January 1831 the First Sea Lord gave orders that four paddle vessels be built to competitive designs. The vessels were to be powered by Maudslay, Son & Field steam engines, carry a schooner rig and mount one or two 10-inch shell guns. Initially classed simply as a steam vessel (SV), she was re-classed as a second-class steam sloop when that categorization was introduced on 31 May 1844. Designed by Joseph Seaton, the Master Shipwright of Sheerness, she was initially slated to be built in Portsmouth, and was changed to Sheerness Dockyard. She was launched and completed in 1832, took part in the Second Anglo-Burmese War and was broken up in 1883.

Salamander was the eighth named ship since it was introduced for a Scottish ship captured in 1544 and listed until 1559.

== Design and specifications ==
Her keel was laid in April 1831 at Sheerness Dockyard and launched on 14 May 1832 (Note: Bastock shows her launch date as 16 May 1832.). Her gundeck was 175 feet 5 inches (53.47 metres) with her keel length reported for tonnage calculation was 151 feet 8 inches (46.23 metres). Her maximum breadth was 32 feet 2 inches (9.80 metres) with 31 feet 10 inches (9.70 metres) being reported for tonnage. Her depth of hold was 17 feet 0 inches (5.18 metres). Her light draught was 12 feet 6 inches (3.81 metres) forward and 13 feet 6 inches (4.11 metres) aft. Her builder's measure tonnage was 818 tons though her displacement was 1,014 tons.

Her machinery was supplied by Maudslay, Son & Field of Lambeth. She was fitted with two fire-tube rectangular boilers. Her steam engine was a two-cylinder vertical single expansion (VSE) engine rated at 220 nominal horsepower (NHP). During her steam trials the engine generated 506 indicated horsepower (377 kW) for a speed of 7.2 knots (13.3 km/h). She originally was to have a schooner sail plan; however, this was changed to a barque or barquentine sail rig.

Her armament initially consisted of two Miller's Original 10-inch 84 hundredweight (cwt) (Note: "cwt", or "hundredweight" refers to the weight of the gun itself.) muzzle-loading smooth bore (MLSB) shell guns on pivot mounts and two Bloomfield's 32-pounder (Note: "32-pounder" refers to the weight of the shot fired.) 25 cwt MLSB guns on broadside trucks. The 32-pounders increased to four guns. In 1862 one of the 10-inch guns was replaced by an Armstrong 7-inch rifled breach-loading (RBL) gun on a pivot mount. This Armstrong gun was more commonly known as the 100/110-pounder depending on the weight of shell carried. This gun was probably withdrawn in the late 1860s due to a weakness in the breach mechanism.

She was completed on 12 February 1833 with an initial cost of £34,224 (builder – £20,429, machinery – £11,201 and fitting – £2,704). (Note: A total cost accounting for inflation of approximately £3,079,600 in today's money.)

== Commissioned service ==
=== First commission ===
She was commissioned on 27 November 1832 at Woolwich Dockyard under Commander Horatio Thomas Austin, RN. From 15 February 1834 she was under Commander William Langford Castle, for service in the Channel; on 15 April 1836 she was under Commander John Duffill, and then on 16 August 1836 to 1840 she was under Commander Sydney Dacres, notably off the north coast of Spain during the first of the Carlist Wars. On 16 September she was under Commander Hastings Henry, but paid off from this commission on 11 August 1841.

=== Second commission ===
On 25 June 1842 she was recommissioned under Commander Andrew Snape Hamond (1811–1874), and joined the South America Station, before proceeding to the Pacific.

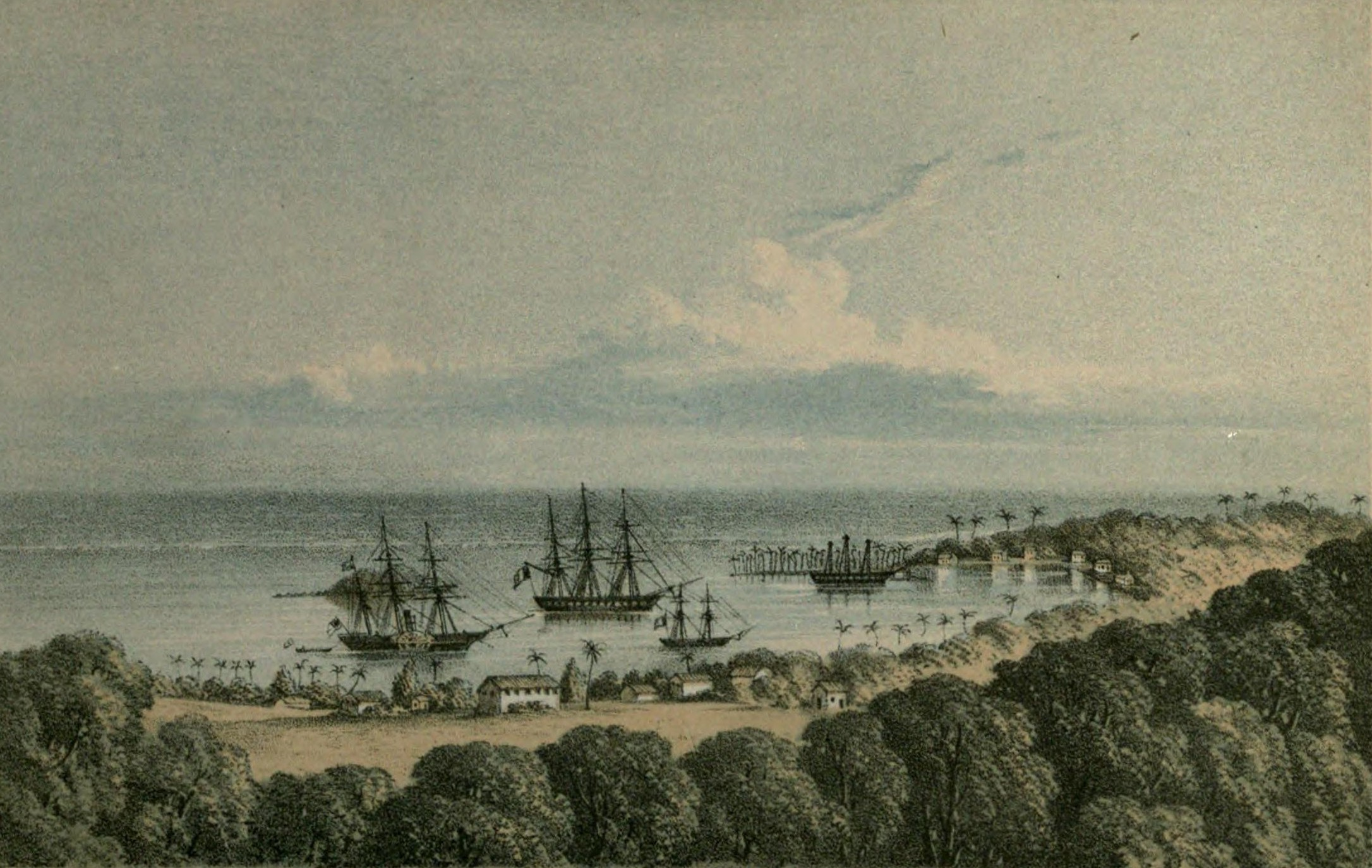
Salamander in the harbour of Papeeti, taken from the hill at the back of the town

She was stationed in Papeeti, Tahiti as an observer during the Franco-Tahitian War from the summer of 1844 to the Autumn of 1846. On her way home in 1847, she was repaired with a new mainmast and bowsprit at Jamaica in February 1847, and then arrived home to pay off in November 1847 at Woolwich Dockyard. After a refit at Sheerness she returned to Woolwich, and in January 1849 she moved to Plymouth where she joined the Steam Reserve.

=== Third commission ===
The Salamander was recommissioned on 17 July 1850 under Commander John Ellman, RN, and proceeded to the East Indies, where she participated in the Second Anglo-Burmese War. She returned home in August 1854, and on 18 August command was taken over by Commander Benjamin Portland Priest, RN for a brief period of service in the Mediterranean before she arrived home again at Portsmouth, to pay off on 23 November 1854 into the Steam Reserve.

=== Fourth commission ===
She recommissioned again on 6 November 1855 under Commander George Mecham, RN, for service off the west coast of Africa. Arriving home in June 1856, she was used as a transport, but in late 1856 she proceeded northwards to search for missing British merchantmen overdue on their voyage from Archangel. She returned to Sheerness in February 1857 to repair damage caused by ice, and was paid off on 4 February. Over the next year, she underwent a major refit at Chatham Dockyard, including the replacement of her boilers. More extensive repairs took place over the next few years, culminating in 1863 in the rebuilding of her poop and masts, and the overhaul of all her machinery.

=== Fifth commission ===
She was recommissioned on 8 December 1863 under Commander John Carnegie, RN, and was assigned to the Australia Station, where she transported the party to set up the coaling station at Albany passage. She undertook survey work along the Great Barrier Reef, running aground on a reef, which was named in her honour, before being refloated. She then undertook survey duties of Wilsons Promontory and Port Phillip Bay under the command of Commander George Nares from 11 July 1865. During this voyage, she ran aground on a reef, damaging her engines and hull. She was refloated and taken in to Brisbane, Queensland, where she was repaired. Salamander left the Australia Station on 4 July 1867. She was paid off in December 1867 into the Steam Reserve.

=== Ancillary service ===
Over the next decade, the Salamander served in a number of ancillary tasks, mainly as a tug or a transport, under a variety of commanding officers. During 1870 she under command of Commander George F.B. Swain, RN and in 1872 she was under the command of Commander John C. Solfleet, RN. During this time she was used intermittently used as a transport. She was commissioned on 9 April 1872 as a transport under Commander Edward Youel, RN then on 23 December 1872 under Commander James Kiddle, RN. She towed HMS Unicorn to Dundee in 1873, but afterwards was paid off into reserve again on 20 July 1875 at Portsmouth.

== Fate ==
She was sold to Henry Castle & Sons for breaking in October 1883. She was towed to Charlton on 19 December 1883.
