= Exmouth Island =

Island in Nunavut, Canada

- Location within Nunavut Location within Canada

Geography
- Location: Northern Canada
- Coordinates: 77°13′N 95°53′W
- Archipelago: Queen Elizabeth Islands; Arctic Archipelago
- Area: 6 km^{2} (2.3 sq mi)
- Highest elevation: 45 m (148 ft)
- Highest point: Milne Peak

Administration
- Canada
- Territory: Nunavut

Demographics
- Population: Uninhabited

Exmouth Island is one of six islands in the Norwegian Bay west of Ellesmere Island, Queen Elizabeth Islands in the Arctic Archipelago.
