= Cheyne Islands =

Island group in Nunavut, Canada

- Location within Nunavut Location within Canada

Geography
- Location: Penny Strait
- Coordinates: 76°18′N 097°30′W
- Archipelago: Queen Elizabeth Islands; Arctic Archipelago

Administration
- Canada
- Nunavut: Nunavut
- Region: Qikiqtaaluk

Demographics
- Population: Uninhabited

The uninhabited Cheyne Islands are members of the Queen Elizabeth Islands and the Arctic Archipelago in the Qikiqtaaluk Region of Nunavut, Canada. The group is made up of three islands known as North Island, Middle Island, and South Island. Located approximately 5 km (3.1 mi) off eastern Bathurst Island, they are situated near Reindeer Bay within western Penny Strait.

== Geography ==
These small alluvial islands, approximately 7 km (4.3 mi) in size, with an elevation up to 3 m (9.8 ft) above sea level, are characterized by barrens and rocky flats.

== Flora ==
Moss can be found growing on the Middle and South islands.

== Fauna ==
They are a Canadian Important Bird Area (#NU049) and a Key Migratory Bird Terrestrial Habitat site (NU site 5). Notable bird species include Ross's gull and northern common eider.
