= Massey Sound =

Watercourse in Nunavut, Canada

- Interactive map of Massey Sound
- Coordinates: 78°30′N 094°00′W
- Basin countries: Canada
- Settlements: Uninhabited

Massey Sound is a natural, uninhabited waterway through the Canadian Arctic Archipelago in Qikiqtaaluk, Nunavut, Canada. It separates Amund Ringnes Island (to the west) from Axel Heiberg Island (to the east). To the north the sound opens into the Peary Channel, and to the south into Norwegian Bay. Haig-Thomas Island lies in the sound.
