= Exmouth Peninsula =

Peninsula in Chile

Exmouth Peninsula also known as Promontorio Exmouth is a peninsula in southern Chile, located at approximately 49 degrees south and 74 degrees west, near Puerto Edén.
