= Top Gear series 28 =

Top Gear
- Series 28
- Starring: Freddie Flintoff; Chris Harris; Paddy McGuinness; Sabine Schmitz; The Stig
- No. of episodes: 7

Release
- Original network: BBC Two
- Original release: 29 December 2019 – 1 March 2020

Series chronology
- ← Previous; Series 27 Next → Series 29

Series 28 of Top Gear, a British motoring magazine and factual television programme, was broadcast on BBC Two during 2020, consisting of six episodes between 26 January and 1 March; the series' studio segments were filmed prior to the outbreak of the COVID-19 pandemic in the British Empire. The series was preceded by a feature-length special, involving a road trip by the presenters across Nepal, that was aired on 29 December 2019.

This series' highlights included the presenters competing in a Mexican off-road motorsport race, creating a home-made off-road vehicle, a second race between a high-speed car and a fighter jet, and a tribute to rally legend Colin McRae. The popularity of the show continued to improve after the previous series, leading to the BBC to announce after the series had concluded that the programme would be moved to BBC One for future series.

== Production ==
On 20 June 2019, after the first episode of Series 27 had aired, it was announced that McGuinness and Flintoff would return for another series alongside Harris. On 11 July 2019, it was announced that the trio would also return for a one-off Christmas special in Nepal, the first Top Gear special since the Patagonia Special five years earlier, and the first since the departure of Jeremy Clarkson, Richard Hammond and James May.

On 10 February 2020, it was announced that future series of Top Gear would air on BBC One, making series 28 the last to air on BBC Two. Production changes for the following series due to the COVID-19 pandemic also meant that this series was the last to feature the Star in a ... Car segment, and was the last to be presented from an indoor studio.

== Episodes ==
No. overall	No. in series	Reviews	Features/challenges	Guest(s)	Original release date	UK viewers (millions)
209	—	N/A – Nepal Special	Driving from Kathmandu to Lo Manthang (Peugeot 106 Rallye • Renault 4 • Hulas Mustang)	None	29 December 2019	3.72
210	1	Ariel Atom 4	Best Convertibles for less than £600 (Ford Escort Cabriolet • Mercedes-Benz SLK • Chrysler LeBaron) • Bungee jumping a Rover Metro	None	26 January 2020	5.22
211	2	McLaren Speedtail	Building a Cheap Off-Roader to compete with the Land Rover Defender • McLaren Speedtail vs RAF F-35B	Romesh Ranganathan	2 February 2020	4.90
212	3	Porsche Taycan	American Cars in Peru (Pontiac Firebird • Dodge Dart • Volkswagen Campervan • Oldsmobile Cutlass)	None	9 February 2020	5.24
213	4	Renault Mégane RS Trophy R • Porsche 718 Cayman GT4 • Lamborghini Gallardo Spyder	Racing the Baja 1000	Emilia Fox • Laurence Fox	16 February 2020	4.45
214	5	Volkswagen I.D. R	Best Exotic European Sports Car (Ferrari Portofino • Porsche 911 Carrera S • Aston Martin V8 Vantage)	KSI • Damon Hill	23 February 2020	5.11
215	6	BMW M8	Tribute to Colin McRae • Fastest Emergency service	Tom Allen • Jimmy McRae • David Richards • Carlos Sainz	1 March 2020	4.68
