= Hoved Island =

Uninhabited island in the Canadian Arctic

- Location within Nunavut Location within Canada

Geography
- Location: Northern Canada
- Coordinates: 77°32′N 085°09′W
- Archipelago: Queen Elizabeth Islands; Arctic Archipelago
- Area: 158 km^{2} (61 sq mi)
- Length: 18 km (11.2 mi)
- Width: 16 km (9.9 mi)

Administration
- Canada
- Territory: Nunavut

Demographics
- Population: Uninhabited

Hoved Island is part of the Qikiqtaaluk Region of the Canadian territory of Nunavut. The island is located between the Svendsen and Bjorne peninsulas, and within the Baumann Fiord of Ellesmere Island, considered part of the Queen Elizabeth Islands, in the Arctic Archipelago. It comprises an area of 158 km^{2} (61 sq mi).

Hoved Island was first charted and named (hoved, Norwegian for "main") by the second Norwegian expedition of the Fram (1898—1902) under Capt. Otto Sverdrup.
