= HMS Exmouth =

Five ships of the Royal Navy have borne the name HMS Exmouth, after Edward Pellew, 1st Viscount Exmouth:

- HMS Exmouth (1854) was a 90-gun screw propelled second-rate ship of the line launched in 1854. She was lent to the Metropolitan Asylums as a training ship in 1877 and was broken up in 1905.
- HMS Exmouth (1901) was a Duncan-class battleship launched in 1901, sold in 1920 and broken up in 1922.
- HMS Exmouth (1905) was the Royal Navy's first specially commissioned training ship, launched in 1905. She was requisitioned as a depot ship from 1939 to 1945, and then returned to use as a training ship renamed HMS Worcester for Thames Nautical Training College. She was broken up in 1978.
- HMS Exmouth (H02) was an E-class destroyer launched in 1934 and sunk by a U-boat in 1940.
- HMS Exmouth (F84) was a Blackwood-class frigate launched in 1955 and broken up in 1979.
