= Hendriksen Strait =

Strait in Nunavut, Canada

Hendriksen Strait (77°50′N 096°30′W) is a natural waterway through the Canadian Arctic Archipelago in the territory of Nunavut. It separates Amund Ringnes Island (to the north) from Cornwall Island (to the south). To the east, the sound opens into Norwegian Bay. It is 10 km (6.2 mi) wide and 40 km long.

== Bibliography ==
- Mills, William James (2003). Exploring Polar Frontiers: A Historical Encyclopedia. ABC-CLIO. ISBN 1576074226.
