= Prince Patrick Island =

Uninhabited island in the Northwest Territories, Canada

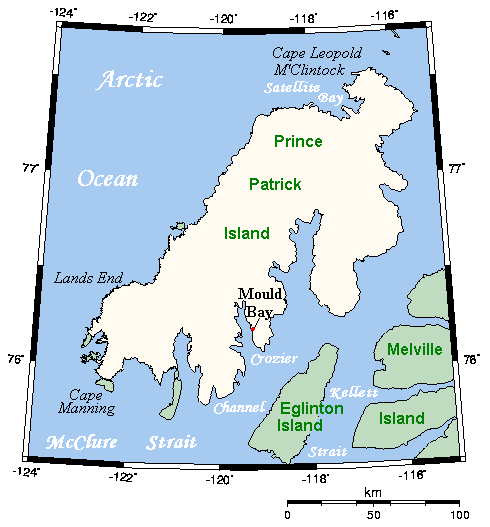
- Prince Patrick Island, showing the Mould Bay weather station

- Location within Northwest Territories Location within Canada

Geography
- Location: Northern Canada
- Coordinates: 76°45′02″N 119°30′12″W
- Archipelago: Queen Elizabeth Islands; Arctic Archipelago
- Area: 15,792.19 km^{2} (6,097.40 sq mi)(2026)
- Area rank: 14th in Canada & 55th worldwide
- Highest elevation: 279 m (915 ft)
- Highest point: unnamed

Administration
- Canada
- Territory: Northwest Territories

Demographics
- Population: Uninhabited

A member of the Arctic Archipelago, Prince Patrick Island is the westernmost of the Queen Elizabeth Islands in the Northwest Territories of Canada, lying northwest of Melville Island. The area of Prince Patrick Island is 15,792.19 km^{2} (6,097.40 sq mi),}} making it the 55th largest island in the world and Canada's 14th largest island. It has historically been icebound all year, making it one of the least accessible parts of Canada. Located at the entrance of the M'Clure Strait, Prince Patrick Island is uninhabited. The first known sighting of the island by Europeans was in 1853 by the Irish born Royal Navy officer George Mecham, when it was explored by him and his fellow Irish explorer Leopold McClintock in the spring of that year during the Edward Belcher expedition. Much later, it was named for Prince Arthur William Patrick Albert, Duke of Connaught, who was Governor General of Canada from 1911 to 1916. The island rises to only about 279 m (915 ft), and the area is seismically active.

== Weather Station ==
A High Arctic Weather Station ("HAWS") and associated airstrip called Mould Bay were opened in 1948 as part of a joint Canada-United States military effort to support a weather station network. Regular weather observations began on May 14, 1948. It had a temporary staff of between 10 and 40 people. Staff size normally increased during summer months, when the station was resupplied from the south. During the period of the United States National Weather Service participation, the site was known as a Joint Arctic Weather Station ("JAWS"). Executive officers alternated between Canadians and their United States counterparts. United States participation ended in 1972. The station was closed in 1997, owing to budget cuts. It was replaced with an automated weather station at a new location on the airstrip, downhill from the central buildings and observatory. The last staffed weather observations were taken on March 31, 1997, ending the continuous weather record of 1948–1997. The buildings still stand, most have deteriorated to an unrepairable state. The station represented the only known long-term human settlement of the Island.

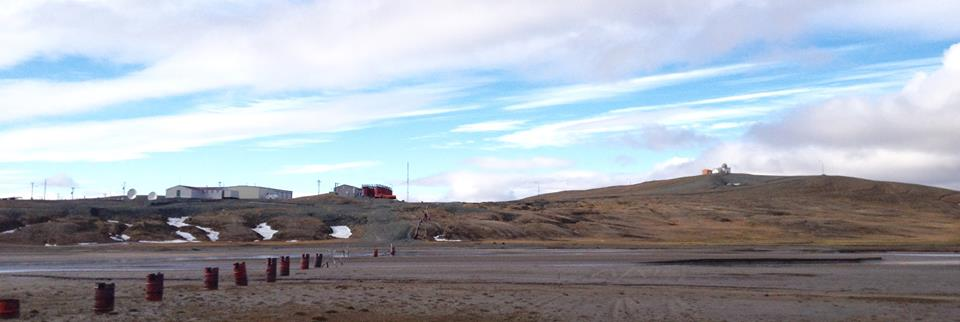
Mould Bay Weather Station in July 2017, more than 22 years following abandonment.

Around Mould Bay
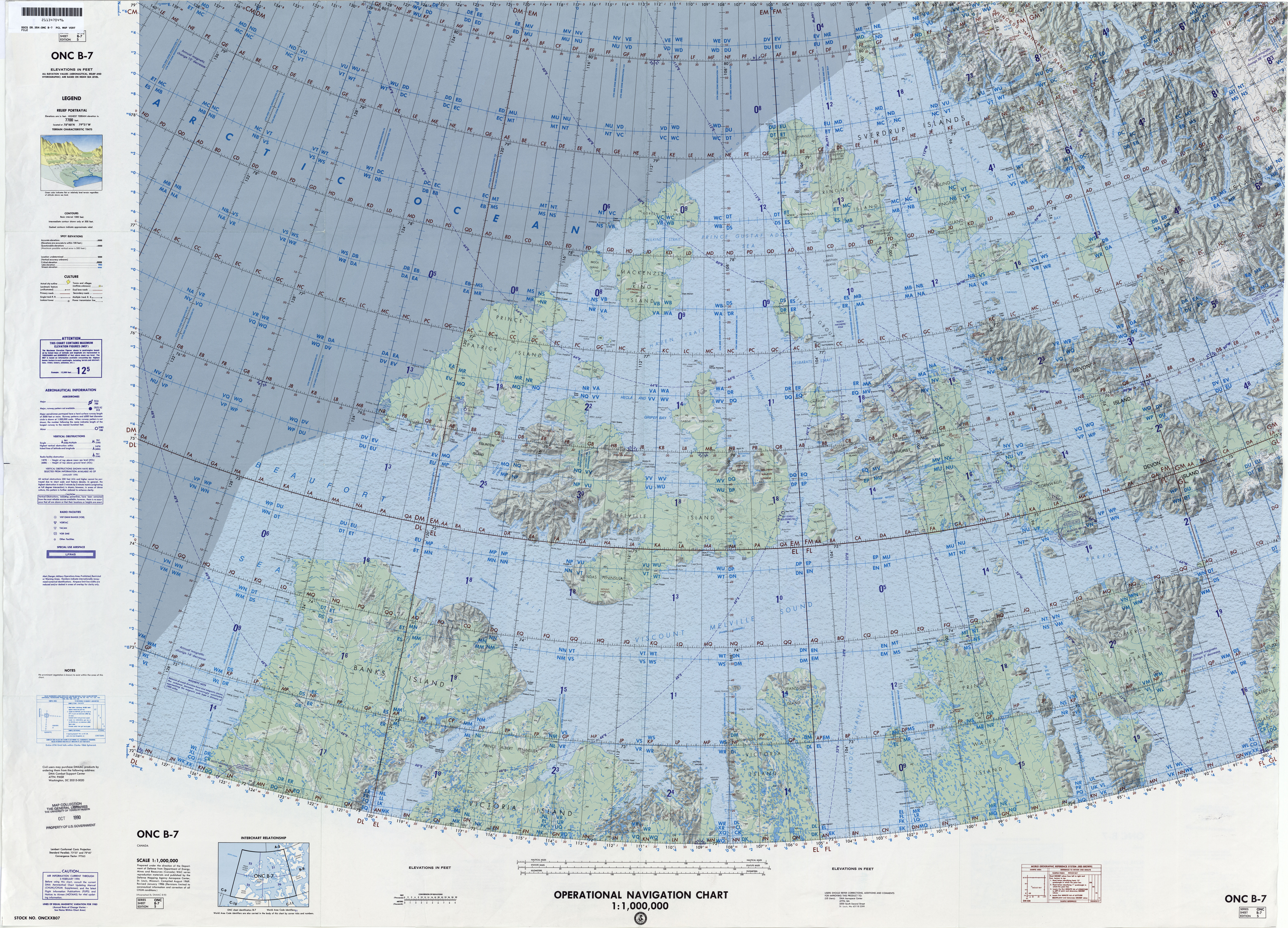
Map including Prince Patrick Island

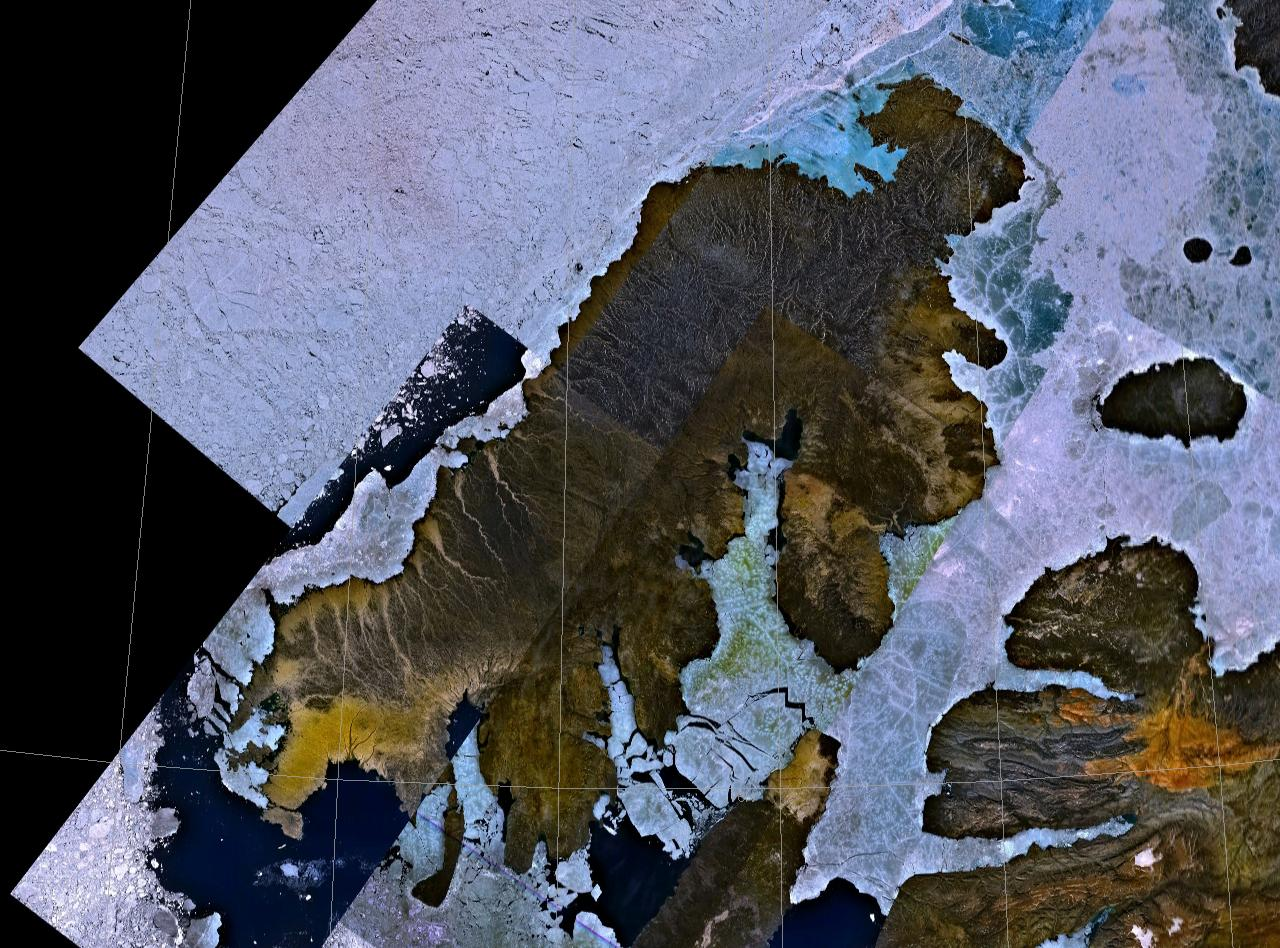
NASA landsat image of Prince Patrick Island

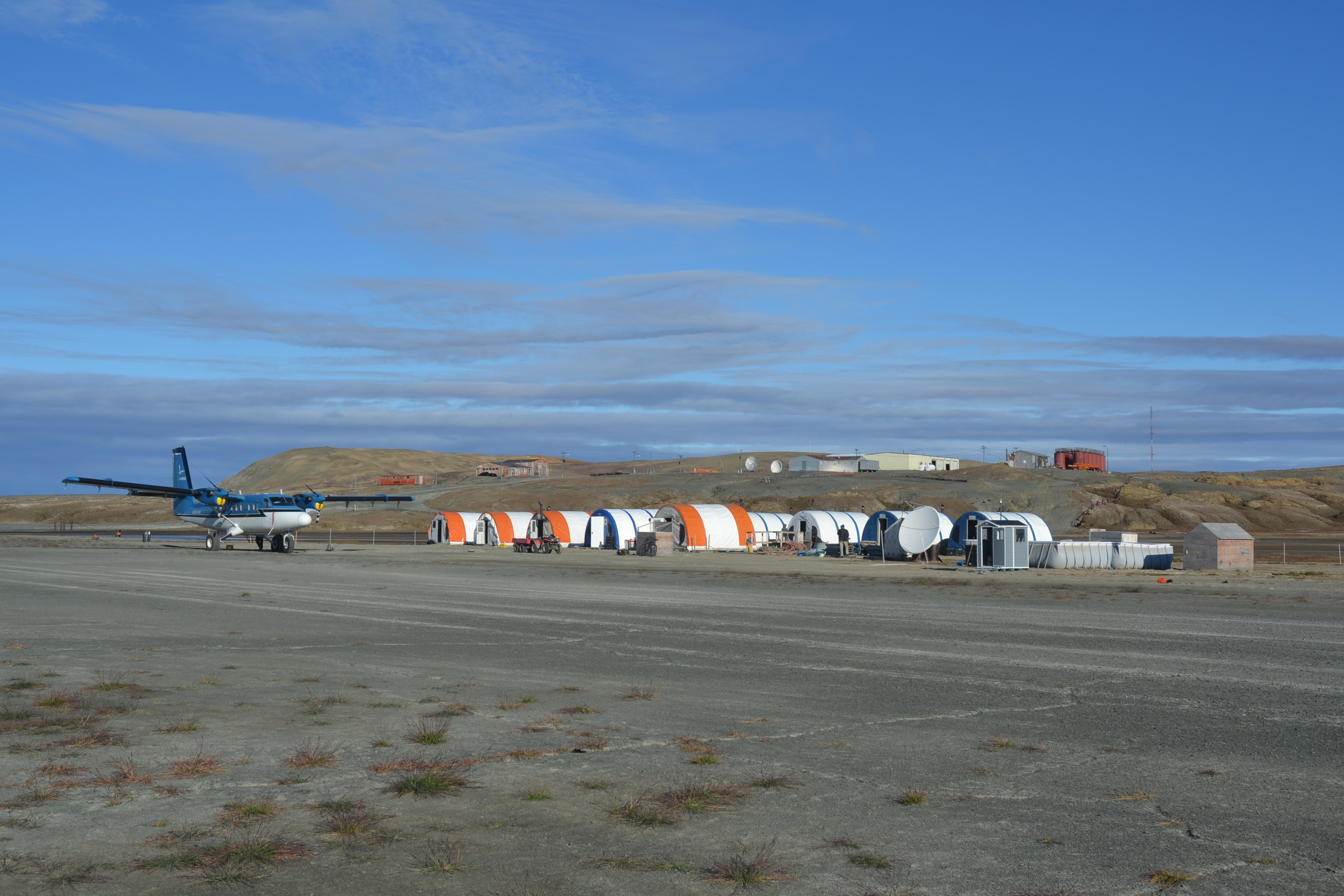
Former Mould Bay Airport

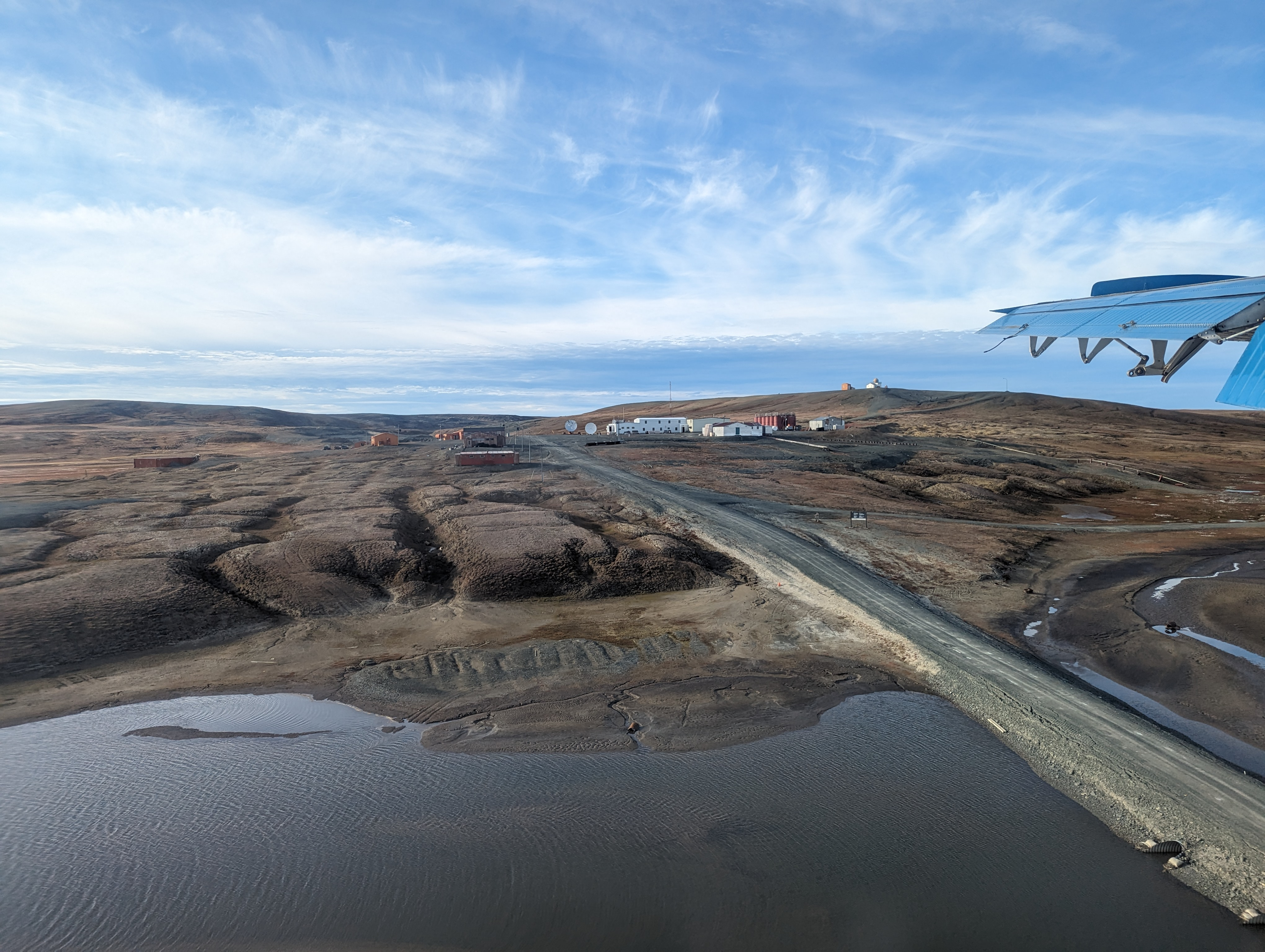
Landing at Mould Bay

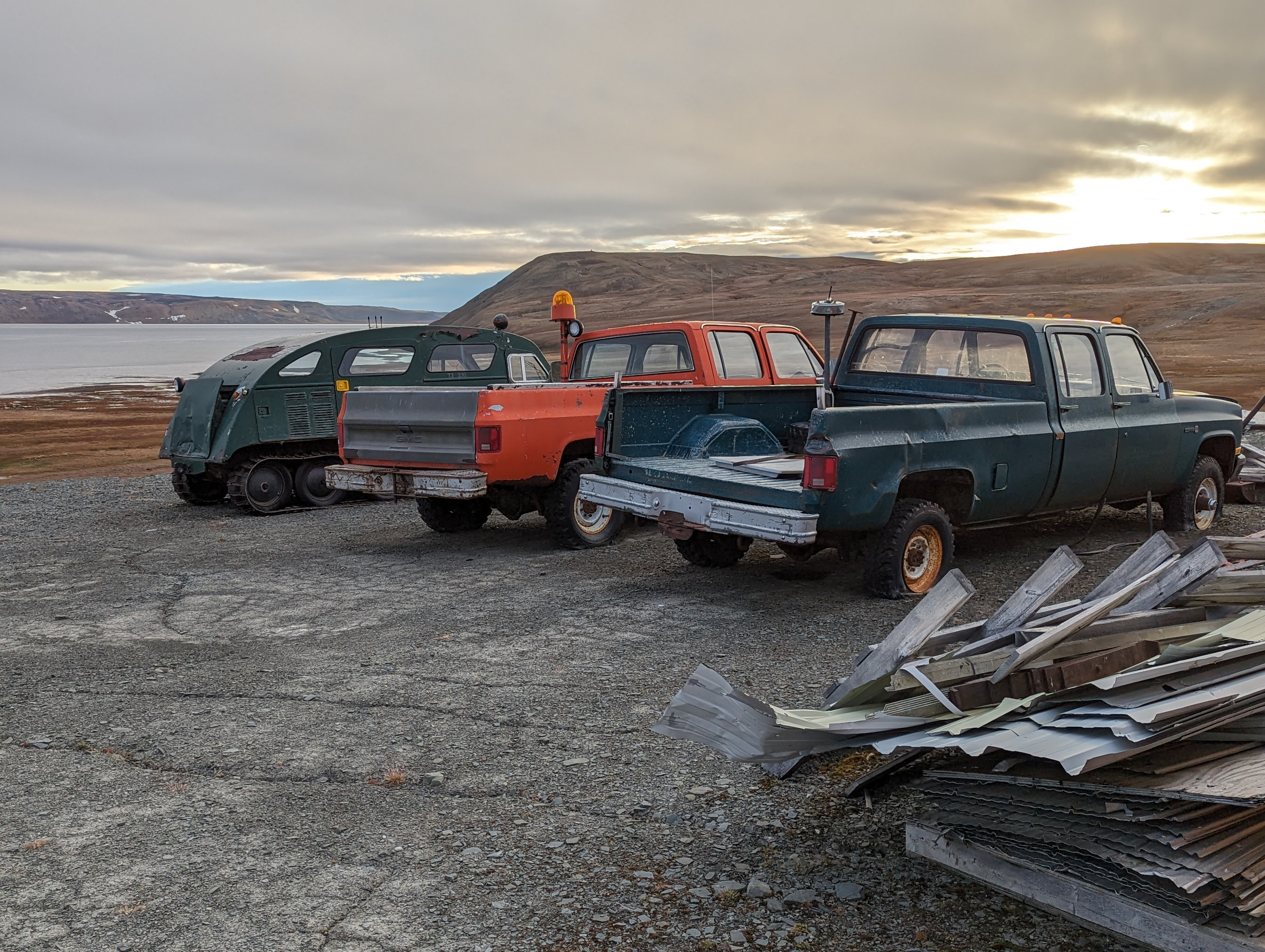
Abandonded vehicles at Mould Bay, with a Bombardier snowcat to the left

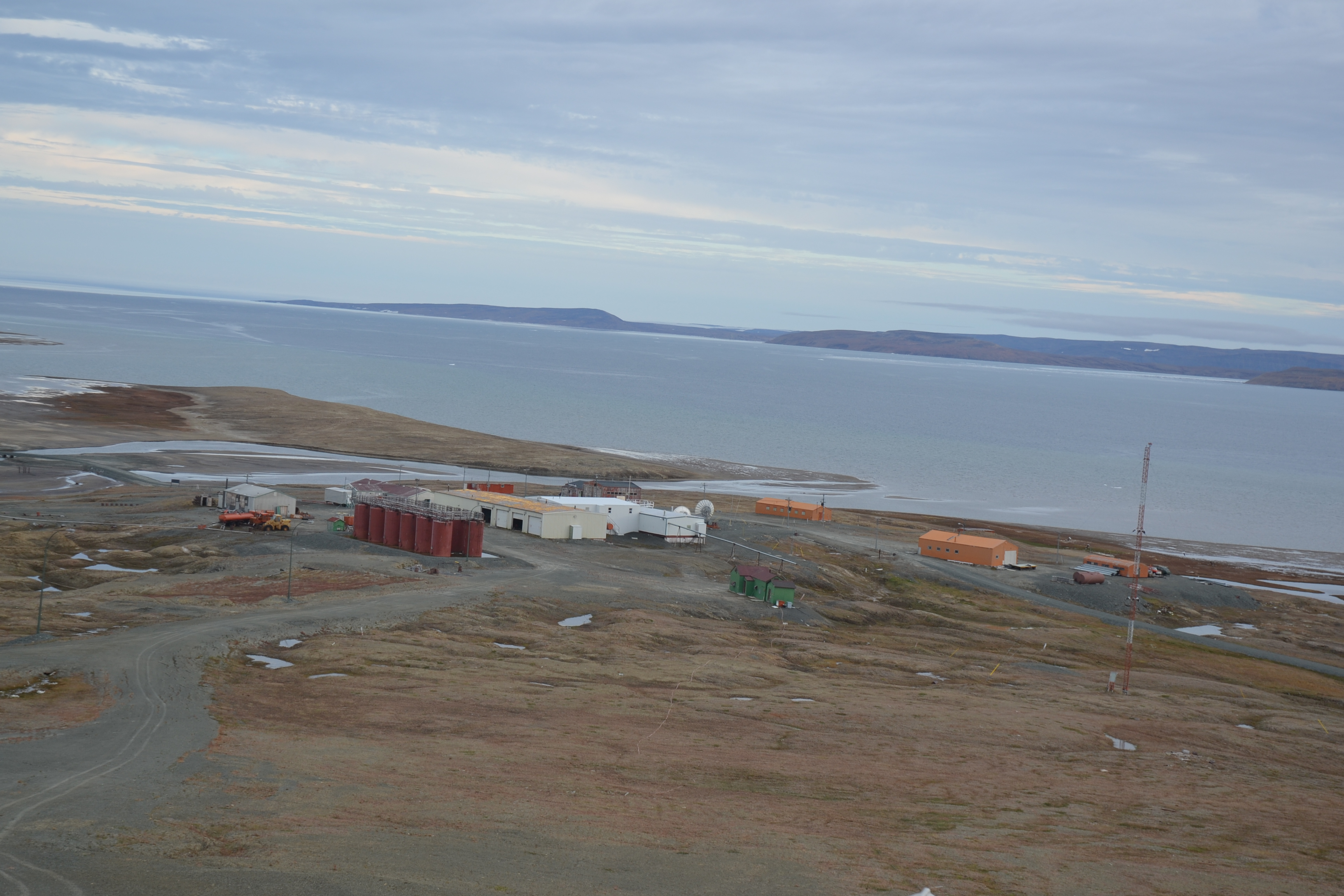
Mould Bay from up on the hill

== Climate ==
Mould Bay has a Polar climate (ET) with cool, intermittent summers and cold winters. September is the snowiest month of the year, averaging 18.5 cm (7.3 in) of snowfall.

Climate data for Mould Bay Airport, 1981–2010 normals, extremes 1948–present
Month	Jan	Feb	Mar	Apr	May	Jun	Jul	Aug	Sep	Oct	Nov	Dec	Year
Record high °C (°F)	−5.3 (22.5)	−4.9 (23.2)	−6.7 (19.9)	−0.5 (31.1)	6.3 (43.3)	18.0 (64.4)	22.7 (72.9)	16.3 (61.3)	7.8 (46.0)	2.5 (36.5)	−1.7 (28.9)	−2.6 (27.3)	22.7 (72.9)
Mean daily maximum °C (°F)	−29.4 (−20.9)	−30.0 (−22.0)	−27.6 (−17.7)	−19.1 (−2.4)	−7.4 (18.7)	2.9 (37.2)	6.7 (44.1)	3.0 (37.4)	−3.8 (25.2)	−14.1 (6.6)	−23.1 (−9.6)	−27.0 (−16.6)	−14.1 (6.6)
Daily mean °C (°F)	−33.1 (−27.6)	−33.9 (−29.0)	−31.4 (−24.5)	−23.0 (−9.4)	−10.4 (13.3)	0.6 (33.1)	4.0 (39.2)	0.9 (33.6)	−6.2 (20.8)	−17.7 (0.1)	−26.6 (−15.9)	−30.5 (−22.9)	−17.3 (0.9)
Mean daily minimum °C (°F)	−36.9 (−34.4)	−37.6 (−35.7)	−34.9 (−30.8)	−26.8 (−16.2)	−13.5 (7.7)	−1.7 (28.9)	1.2 (34.2)	−1.3 (29.7)	−8.5 (16.7)	−21.3 (−6.3)	−30.2 (−22.4)	−34.0 (−29.2)	−20.4 (−4.7)
Record low °C (°F)	−52.2 (−62.0)	−53.9 (−65.0)	−54.7 (−66.5)	−46.1 (−51.0)	−29.6 (−21.3)	−14.4 (6.1)	−3.9 (25.0)	−13.5 (7.7)	−26.1 (−15.0)	−38.9 (−38.0)	−44.4 (−47.9)	−52.8 (−63.0)	−54.7 (−66.5)
Record low wind chill	−72.8	−72.0	−70.1	−60.5	−39.2	−22.5	−10.8	−17.3	−35.0	−52.3	−57.9	−68.8	−72.8
Average precipitation mm (inches)	4.5 (0.18)	4.6 (0.18)	4.2 (0.17)	3.4 (0.13)	10.8 (0.43)	9.8 (0.39)	13.8 (0.54)	23.8 (0.94)	18.1 (0.71)	12.9 (0.51)	6.7 (0.26)	4.5 (0.18)	117.2 (4.61)
Average rainfall mm (inches)	0.0 (0.0)	0.0 (0.0)	0.0 (0.0)	0.0 (0.0)	0.0 (0.0)	3.6 (0.14)	10.0 (0.39)	11.7 (0.46)	2.2 (0.09)	0.0 (0.0)	0.0 (0.0)	0.0 (0.0)	27.5 (1.08)
Average snowfall cm (inches)	5.4 (2.1)	5.8 (2.3)	5.1 (2.0)	4.7 (1.9)	15.0 (5.9)	6.6 (2.6)	3.8 (1.5)	12.9 (5.1)	18.5 (7.3)	16.1 (6.3)	9.0 (3.5)	6.3 (2.5)	109.2 (43.0)
Average precipitation days (≥ 0.2 mm)	6.1	6.6	6.4	4.9	10.1	6.3	9.0	13.3	12.8	11.6	9.6	6.9	103.6
Average rainy days (≥ 0.2 mm)	0.0	0.0	0.0	0.0	0.0	2.9	7.8	6.2	1.1	0.0	0.0	0.0	18.0
Average snowy days (≥ 0.2 cm)	6.6	6.9	6.8	5.8	12.2	4.2	3.4	8.9	12.5	12.2	10.0	7.1	96.5
Average relative humidity (%)	69.5	67.4	64.6	73.2	82.0	81.3	79.6	84.8	88.2	80.3	73.3	69.6	76.1
Mean monthly sunshine hours	0.0	0.0	97.9	287.5	267.9	297.2	254.1	121.0	49.6	15.5	0.0	0.0	1,390.5
Percentage possible sunshine	0.0	0.0	27.8	49.9	36.0	41.3	34.2	17.4	11.6	6.9	0.0	0.0	25.0
Source: Environment and Climate Change Canada

== See also ==
- Royal eponyms in Canada
