= Graham Island (Nunavut) =

Uninhabited island in the Arctic Archipelago

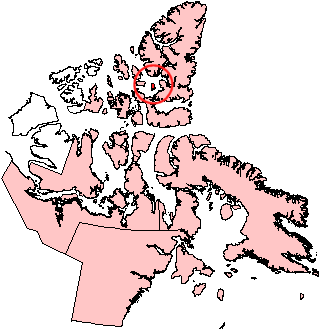
- Graham Island, Nunavut

- Location within Nunavut Location within Canada

Geography
- Location: Norwegian Bay
- Coordinates: 77°25′N 90°30′W
- Archipelago: Queen Elizabeth Islands; Arctic Archipelago
- Area: 1,376.93 km^{2} (531.64 sq mi) (2026)
- Area rank: 41st in Canada & 272nd worldwide
- Length: 55 km (34.2 mi)
- Width: 40 km (25 mi)

Administration
- Canada
- Nunavut: Nunavut
- Region: Qikiqtaaluk

Demographics
- Population: Uninhabited

Graham Island is an uninhabited island in the Qikiqtaaluk Region, Nunavut, Canada. A member of the Queen Elizabeth Islands and Arctic Archipelago, it is located in Norwegian Bay off the coast of Ellesmere Island. Located at 77°25′N 90°30′W it has an area of 1,376.9 km^{2} (531.6 sq mi), 55 kilometres (34 mi) long and 40 kilometres (25 mi) wide. It was named in 1910.

== Variation ==
There is a second, much smaller (about 2.0 km × 0.5 km (1.24 mi × 0.31 mi) and 1.09 km^{2} (0.42 sq mi) ), Graham Island at 71°18′N 96°22′W, also in Nunavut, off Boothia Peninsula.
