= Queen Elizabeth Islands =

Northernmost group of islands of the Canadian Arctic Archipelago

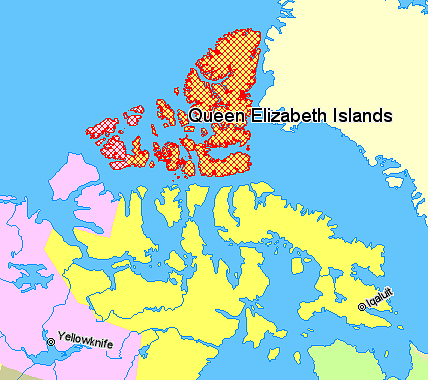
Queen Elizabeth Islands, northern Canada. Nunavut Northwest Territories Quebec Greenland

The Queen Elizabeth Islands (French: Îles de la Reine-Élisabeth) are the northernmost cluster of islands in Canada's Arctic Archipelago, split between Nunavut and the Northwest Territories in Northern Canada. The Queen Elizabeth Islands contain approximately 14% of the global glacier and ice cap area (excluding the inland and shelf ice sheets of Greenland and Antarctica). The southern islands are called the Parry Islands or Parry Archipelago. (Note: A name formerly used for the entire Queen Elizabeth Islands)

== Geography ==
The islands, together 419,061 km^{2} (161,800 sq mi) in area, were renamed as a group after Elizabeth II on her coronation as Queen of Canada in 1953. The islands cover an area approximately the shape of a right triangle, bounded by the Nares Strait on the east, Parry Channel on the south and the Arctic Ocean to the north and west. Most are uninhabited although the Natural Resources Canada's Climate Change Geoscience Program Earth Sciences Sector (ESS), has monitors on the islands. In 1969 Panarctic Oils, now part of Suncor Energy, began operating exploration oil wells in the Franklinian and Sverdrup basins and planned on establishing its resource base in the Queen Elizabeth Islands. It ceased production in the 1970s. At the 2013 GeoConvention the Arctic Islands region were called Canada's perpetual "last petroleum exploration frontier". Hogg and Enachescu argued that the development and implementation of advanced marine and land seismic technologies in Alaska, Northern Europe and Siberia could be modified for use in the Queen Elizabeth Islands.

Queen Elizabeth Islands had not been fully charted until the British Northwest Passage expeditions and later Norwegian exploration of the 19th century.

These islands were known as the Parry Archipelago for over 130 years. They were first named after British Arctic explorer Sir William Parry, who sailed there in 1820, aboard the Hecla. Since the renaming of the archipelago in 1953, the term Parry Islands continued to be used for its southwestern part (less Ellesmere Island and the Sverdrup Islands). The regional break down of the archipelago is therefore as follows:

- Ellesmere Island
- Sverdrup Islands
- Parry Islands

Ellesmere Island is the northernmost and by far the largest. The Sverdrup Islands are located west of Ellesmere Island and north of Norwegian Bay. The remaining islands further south and west, but north of the Parry Channel (Lancaster Sound, Viscount Melville Sound and M'Clure Strait), have been carrying the name Parry Islands, which name until 1953 had also included the Sverdrup Islands and Ellesmere Island. South of the Parry Channel are the remaining islands of the Arctic Archipelago.

The islands lay on top of and were formed by the movement of the Queen Elizabeth Islands Subplate.

=== Major islands ===
Many of the islands are among the largest in the world, the largest being Ellesmere Island. Other major islands include Amund Ringnes Island, Axel Heiberg Island, Bathurst Island, Borden Island, Cornwall Island, Cornwallis Island, Devon Island, Eglinton Island, Ellef Ringnes Island, Mackenzie King Island, Melville Island, and Prince Patrick Island.

=== Smaller islands ===
Other smaller but notable islands include; Beechey Island (74°43′N 091°51′W), which held the graves of Petty Officer John Torrington, Royal Marine Private William Braine, and Able Seaman John Hartnell, three members of Sir John Franklin's crew who took part in his lost expedition, Hans Island (80°49′41″N 066°27′35″W), a small, uninhabited barren knoll measuring 1.3 km^{2} (0.50 sq mi) whose ownership was disputed by Canada and Denmark until 14 June 2022, when both countries agreed to split the disputed island roughly in half., the Cheyne Islands (76°18′22″N 097°31′12″W), three small (0.73 km^{2} (0.28 sq mi) together) islands that are Important Bird Area (#NU049) and a Key Migratory Bird Terrestrial Habitat site (NU site 5) and Skraeling Island (78°54′42″N 075°37′58″W) an important archaeological site where Inuit (along with their ancestors the Dorset and Thule) and Norse artifacts have been found. They consist of Silurian and Carboniferous rocks covered with tundra.

=== Population ===
With a population of less than 400, the islands are nearly uninhabited. There are only three permanently inhabited places in the islands. The two municipalities are the hamlets of Resolute (population 198 as of the 2016 census), on Cornwallis Island, and Grise Fiord (population 129 as of the 2016 census), on Ellesmere Island. Alert is a weather station staffed by Environment and Climate Change Canada, a Global Atmosphere Watch (GAW) atmosphere monitoring laboratory on Ellesmere Island, and has several temporary inhabitants due to the co-located CFS Alert. Eureka, a small research base on Ellesmere Island, has a population of zero but at least eight staff on a continuous rotational basis.

Abandoned Permanent Settlement Seasonally Occupied

Name	Image	Type	Island	Population	Established	Coordinates	Notes
Alert		Weather station, Canadian Forces base (CFS Alert), airport (Alert Airport)	Ellesmere	5	1950 (Note: The weather station was established in 1950 and the military station was established in 1958)	82°30′N 62°20′W	Northernmost permanent settlement in the world
Alexandra Fiord		Research station	Ellesmere	0	1953	78°54′N 75°59′W	Used as a Royal Canadian Mounted Police detachment from 1953 to 1963. At the time, it was the northernmost police station in the world.
Camp Hazen		Warden station	Ellesmere	0	1957	81°49′N 62°19′W	Used as a research station from 1957 to 1958 for Operation Hazen; Owned by Parks Canada and currently used as an access point to Quttinirpaaq National Park
Cape Columbia Depot		North Pole expedition depot	Ellesmere	0	1909	83°06′41″N 69°57′13″W	location for Robert Peary's northernmost depot of his final attempt to reach the North Pole
Cape Sheridan		North Pole expedition wintering site	Ellesmere	0	1908	82°28′N 61°30′W	location for Robert Peary's wintering site of his final attempt to reach the North Pole; 13.5 km ESE of Alert
Craig Harbour		Royal Canadian Mounted Police (RCMP) detachment	Ellesmere	0	1922	76°12′N 81°01′W	Established in 1922 to protect Canadian sovereignty of the island
Dundas Harbour		Outpost, RCMP detachment	Devon	0	1924	74°31′N 82°23′W	Established in 1924 to create a government presence to curb foreign whaling and other activity in the area
Eureka		Weather station, research station, aerodrome (Eureka Aerodrome)	Ellesmere	0	1947	79°59′N 82°23′W	Founded in 1947 as part of a requirement to set up a network of Arctic weather stations; May have up to eight people on a rotating basis
Flashline Mars Arctic Research Station		Research station	Devon	0	1999	75°25′N 89°49′W	The structures were built in 2000
Fort Conger		Research station	Ellesmere	0	1883	81°43′N 64°43′W	Established in 1881 but abandoned several decades later
Grise Fiord		Hamlet, airport (Grise Fiord Airport)	Ellesmere	129	1953	76°25′N 82°53′W	Northernmost civilian settlement in Canada; Created as part of the High Arctic relocation
Isachsen		Weather station, research station	Ellef Ringnes	0	1948	78°46′N 103°29′W	An Automated Surface Observing System was placed at the site in 1989, linked by satellite communications to southern Canada
McGill Arctic Research Station		Research station	Axel Heiberg	0	1959	79°20′N 91°58′W	Owned by McGill University
Mould Bay		Weather station	Prince Patrick	0	1948	76°14′N 119°19′W	Former Environment and Climate Change Canada weather station; Still occasionally visited by members of the Canadian Armed Forces
Resolute		Hamlet, airport (Resolute Bay Airport)	Cornwallis	229	1947	74°41′N 94°49′W	Created as part of the High Arctic relocation; Most populous settlement in the Queen Elizabeth Islands; Second northernmost public community in Canada, only behind Grise Fiord
Tanquary Fiord		Warden station	Ellesmere	0	??	81°25′N 76°52′W	Tanquary Fiord Airport nearby; Owned by Parks Canada
Ward Hunt Island		Warden station	Ward Hunt Island	0	1960s?	83°06′N 74°10′W	Ward Hunt Island Airport nearby; Owned by Parks Canada

Formerly staffed stations were Mould Bay on Prince Patrick Island, Isachsen on Ellef Ringnes Island, and Fort Conger on Ellesmere Island.

Abandoned settlements are Dundas Harbour on Devon Island and Craig Harbour on Ellesmere Island.

== Administration ==
Until 1999, the Queen Elizabeth Islands were part of the Baffin Region of the Northwest Territories.

With the creation of Nunavut in 1999 all islands and fractions of islands of the archipelago east of the 110th meridian west became part of the Qikiqtaaluk Region of the new territory, which was the major portion of the archipelago. The rest remained with the now-reduced Northwest Territories. Borden Island, Mackenzie King Island and Melville Island were divided between the two territories.

Prince Patrick Island, Eglinton Island and Emerald Island are the only notable islands that are now completely part of the Northwest Territories.

Below the level of the territory, there is the municipal level of administration. On that level, there are only two municipalities, Resolute and Grise Fiord, with an aggregate area of 450 km^{2} (170 sq mi) (0.11 percent of the area of the Queen Elizabeth Islands), but with most of the population of the archipelago (327 in 2021). The remaining 99.89 percent are unincorporated area, with a census 2021 population of zero, albeit a fluctuating population centred in Alert and Eureka, Nunavut.

== Overview of the islands ==
According to the Atlas of Canada there are 34 larger and 2,092 smaller islands in the archipelago. With the exception of Ellesmere Island, they fall into two groups, the Sverdrup Islands and the Parry Islands:

Island	sub- group	Territory	Peak	Height m	Height ft	Area km^{2}	Area sq mi	Rank Canada	Rank World	Coordinates
Alexander	Parry	NU	average elevation	60–180	200–590	484	187	66		75°52′N 102°37′W
Amund Ringnes	Sverdrup	NU	ridge	265	869	5,255	2,029	25	111	77°53′N 095°30′W
Axel Heiberg	Sverdrup	NU	Outlook Peak	2,210	7,250	43,178	16,671	7	32	79°26′N 090°46′W
Baillie-Hamilton Island	Parry	NU		200	660	290	110	91		75°53′N 094°35′W
Bathurst	Parry	NU	Stokes Mountain	412	1,352	16,042	6,194	13	54	75°46′N 099°47′W
Borden	Parry	NU/NT		150	490	2,794	1,079	30	170	78°33′N 111°10′W
Brock	Parry	NT		67	220	764	295	58	383	77°51′N 114°27′W
Buckingham Island	Parry	NU	Mount Windsor	150	490	137	53	137		77°12′N 091°00′W
Byam Martin	Parry	NU		153	502	1,150	440	42	294	75°12′N 104°17′W
Cameron	Parry	NU	Mount Wilmot			1,059	409	46	312	77°48′N 101°51′W
Coburg Island	Parry	NU		800	2,600	411	159	83		75°57′N 079°18′W
Cornwall	Sverdrup	NU	McLeod Peak	400	1,300	2,358	910	31	184	77°37′N 094°52′W
Cornwallis	Parry	NU		343	1,125	6,995	2,701	21	96	75°05′N 095°00′W
Devon	Parry	NU	Devon Ice Cap	1,920	6,300	55,247	21,331	6	27	75°08′N 087°51′W
Eglinton	Parry	NT		200	660	1,541	595	36	249	75°46′N 118°27′W
Ellef Ringnes	Sverdrup	NU	Isachsen Dome	260	850	11,295	4,361	16	69	78°37′N 101°56′W
Ellesmere		NU	Barbeau Peak	2,616	8,583	196,236	75,767	3	10	80°10′N 079°05′W
Emerald Isle	Parry	NT		150	490	549	212	63	466	76°48′N 114°07′W
Graham	Sverdrup	NU		175	574	1,378	532	38	265	77°26′N 090°30′W
Griffith Island	Parry	NU				189	73	110		74°35′N 095°30′W
Helena Island	Parry	NU	average in southern hills	220	720	327	126	85		76°40′N 101°00′W
Hoved Island	Parry	NU				158	61	125		77°32′N 085°09′W
Île Vanier	Parry	NU		200	660	1,126	435	44	298	76°10′N 103°15′W
King Christian	Sverdrup	NU	King Christian Mountain	165	541	645	249	60	420	77°45′N 102°00′W
Little Cornwallis Island	Parry	NU				412	159	75		75°30′N 096°30′W
Lougheed	Parry	NU		60–110	200–360	1,308	505	41	273	77°24′N 105°15′W
Lowther Island	Parry	NU	raised beach	106.5	349	145	56	133		74°33′N 097°30′W
Mackenzie King	Parry	NU/NT	Castel Butte	300	980	5,048	1,949	26	115	77°43′N 111°57′W
Massey	Parry	NU		210	690	432	167	71		75°59′N 102°58′W
Meighen	Sverdrup	NU		260	850	955	369	50	337	79°59′N 099°30′W
Melville	Parry	NU/NT		776	2,546	42,149	16,274	8	33	75°30′N 111°30′W
North Kent	Parry	NU		600	2,000	590	230	62	453	76°40′N 090°15′W
Prince Patrick	Parry	NT		279	915	15,848	6,119	14	55	76°45′N 119°30′W
Stor Island	Sverdrup	NU		500	1,600	313	121	87		78°59′N 085°50′W
remaining 2,092 islands		NU/NT				2,321	896		...	...
Queen Elizabeth		NU/NT	Barbeau Peak	2,616	8,583	419,061	161,800	...	...	78°05′N 095°10′W

== Glaciers and ice caps ==
In 2000 it was estimated that the Queen Elizabeth Islands were covered by about 104,000 km^{2} (40,000 sq mi) glaciers that represent c.14% of all glaciers and ice caps in the world. According to a 2011 report, the surface mass balance of four, the Devon Ice Cap measured 1,699 km^{2} (656 sq mi) (northwest sector only); the Meighen Ice Cap measured 75 km^{2} (29 sq mi); the Melville South Ice Cap measured 52 km^{2} (20 sq mi) and the White Glacier, Axel Heiberg Island glacier was 39 km^{2} (15 sq mi). The size of these glaciers has been measured since 1961 and their results published in such distinguished journals as the International Glaciological Society's Annals of Glaciology.

Of the four ice caps that the federal government's NRCan's Climate Change Geoscience Program Earth Sciences Sector (ESS), monitors onsite in the Canadian High Arctic, three are in the Queen Elizabeth Islands: Devon, Meighen and Melville. A 2013 Natural Resources Canada memo says that shrinking of the ice caps started in the late 1980s, and has accelerated rapidly since 2005. The increased melt rate was confirmed by University of California, Irvine in 2017.

Computer analysis of a glacier inventory of Axel Heiberg Island was undertaken in the 1960s. Later inventories of the World Glacier Monitoring Service under the direction of Fritz Müller, who worked on glacier inventories internationally, included the Axel Heiberg Island glacier.

Other glaciers and ice caps in the Queen Elizabeth Islands include the Agassiz Ice Cap, Benedict Glacier, Disraeli Glacier, Eugenie Glacier, Gull Glacier, Parrish Glacier, Sven Hedin Glacier and the Turnabout Glacier.

== See also ==
- List of islands of Canada
- List of Canadian islands by area
- Royal eponyms in Canada
