= Norwegian Bay =

Bay in Nunavut, Canada

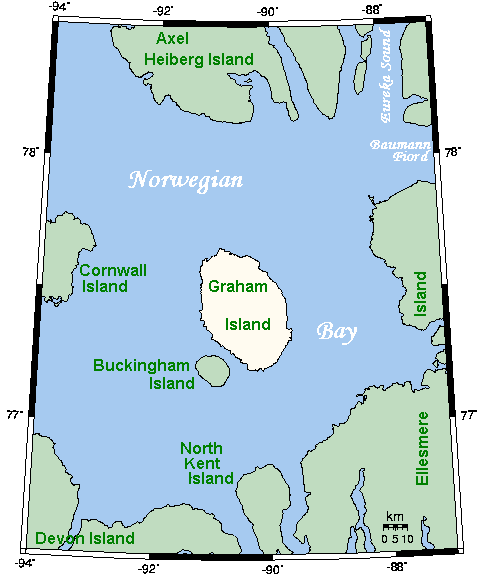
- Norwegian Bay and some of its islands.

- Location within Nunavut
- Location: Between Massey Sound and Jones Sound
- Coordinates: 77°30′N 90°30′W
- Ocean/sea sources: Arctic Ocean
- Basin countries: Canada
- Max. length: 161 km (100 mi)
- Max. width: 145 km (90 mi)
- Settlements: Uninhabited

Norwegian Bay (French: Baie Norvégienne) is an Arctic Ocean waterway in the Qikiqtaaluk Region of Nunavut, Canada. Amund Ringnes Island is to the northwest (separated by the Hendriksen Strait from Cornwall Island), and Axel Heiberg Island is to the north. (Both Amund Ringnes Island and Axel Heiberg Island are part of the Sverdrup Islands.) Ellesmere Island is to the east, and Devon Island is to the south.

Six islands lie within Norwegian Bay. They are, from largest to smallest:

- Cornwall Island (the largest and westernmost)
- Graham Island
- Buckingham
- Table
- Exmouth
- Ekins
