= Amund Ringnes Island =

Uninhabited island in the Arctic Archipelago

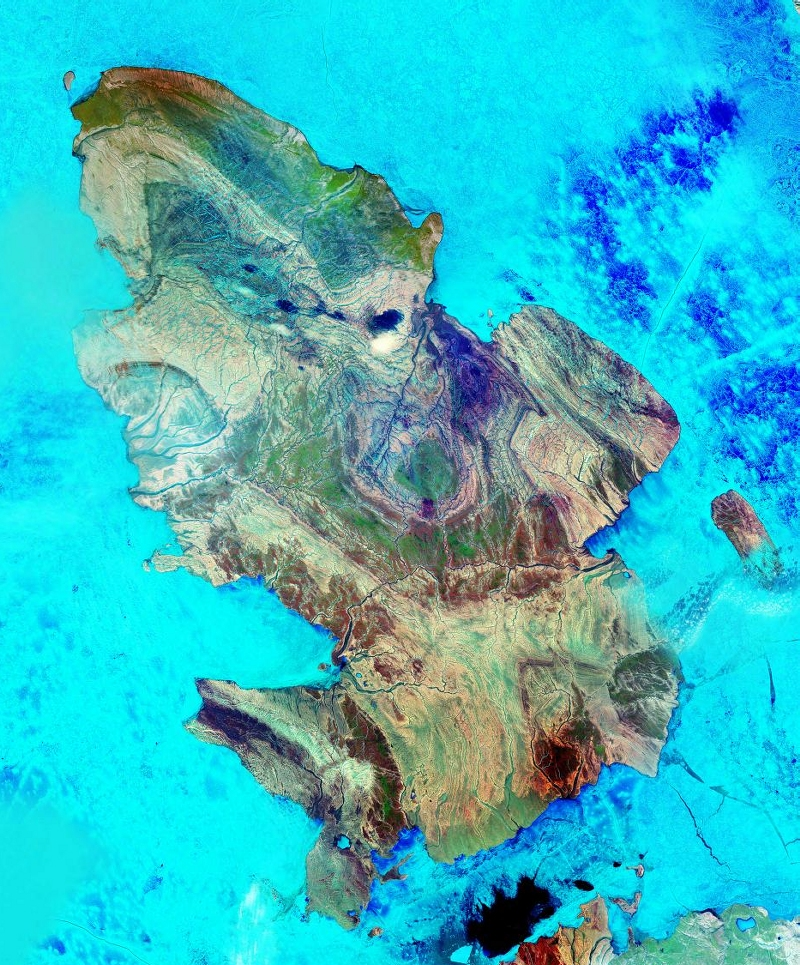
- Amund Ringnes Island from space

- Location within Nunavut Location within Canada

Geography
- Location: Arctic Ocean
- Coordinates: 78°20′N 96°25′W
- Archipelago: Sverdrup Islands; Queen Elizabeth Islands; Arctic Archipelago
- Area: 5,289.51 km^{2} (2,042.29 sq mi) (2026)
- Area rank: 25th in Canada & 112th worldwide
- Highest elevation: 265 m (869 ft)
- Highest point: Un-named ridge feature northeast inland from Andersen Bay

Administration
- Canada
- Territory: Nunavut
- Region: Qikiqtaaluk

Demographics
- Population: Uninhabited

Amund Ringnes Island is an uninhabited island and one of the Sverdrup Islands and Queen Elizabeth Islands in the Qikiqtaaluk Region, Nunavut, Canada. It is located in the Arctic Ocean, between 78 and 79 degrees of latitude. It lies east of Ellef Ringnes Island, west of Axel Heiberg Island. Hassel Sound separates Amund Ringnes Island from Ellef Ringnes Island. Hendriksen Strait is to the south, as is Cornwall Island. Norwegian Bay is to the east, as is Haig-Thomas Island. To the north lies Peary Channel. The island has an area of 5,289.51 km^{2} (2,042.29 sq mi) in size, making it the 112th largest island in the world, and Canada's 25th largest island. The island was named by Otto Sverdrup for Oslo brewer Amund Ringnes, one of the sponsors of his expedition. He first sighted it in 1900. The island was claimed by Norway from 1902 until the claim was relinquished in 1930.

== External sources ==
- Amund Ringnes Island at The Columbia Gazetteer of North America. 2000.
- The Ringnes Islands Archived 2013-01-05 at the Wayback Machine University of Guelph
