= Charles Carroll Simms =

American naval officer (1824–1884)

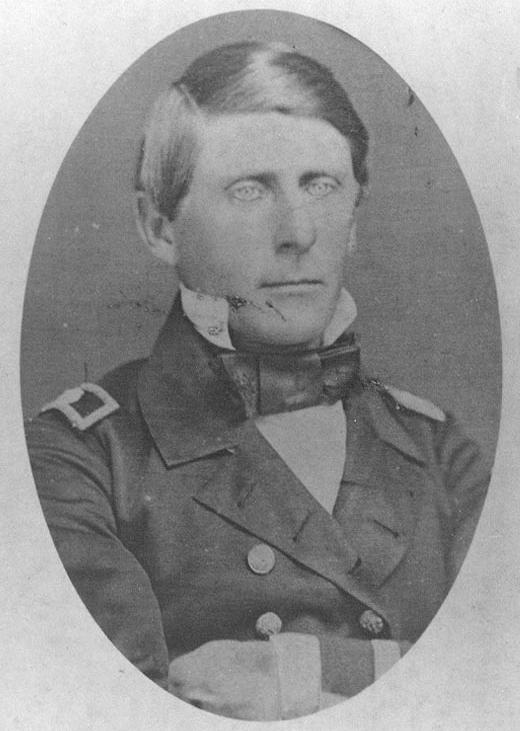
- First Lieutenant Charles Carroll Simms, CSN
- Born: 30 March 1824; Stafford County, Virginia, U.S.
- Died: 18 December 1884 (aged 60); Georgetown, Washington, D.C., U.S.
- Burial place: Rock Creek Cemetery; Washington, D.C., U.S.
- Spouse: Elizabeth James Nourse (m. 1852)
- Children: 2
- Relatives: Charles Simms (grandfather)
- Military career
- Allegiance: United States (1839–1861) Confederate States (1861–1865)
- Branch: Navy
- Service years: 1839–1865
- Rank: First lieutenant
- Commands: USS Release; CSS George Page; CSS Richmond; CSS Appomattox; CSS Baltic; CSS Nashville
- Conflicts: American Civil War; Battle of Roanoke Island; Battle of Hampton Roads (WIA)

Charles Carroll Simms (30 March 1824 – 18 December 1884) was an American naval officer. After serving in the United States Navy from 1839 to 1861, he joined the Confederate States Navy. He was commander of the CSS Appomattox at the Battle of Roanoke Island and later set fire to the ship after it was trapped in the Dismal Swamp Canal. At the Battle of Hampton Roads, he manned a gun on the CSS Virginia. As a lieutenant, he commanded several ships during the Civil War.

== Early life ==
Charles Carroll Simms was born on 30 March 1824 in Stafford County, Virginia, to Eleanor Carroll Brent and John Douglas Simms. His father was chief clerk of the Navy Department and acting Secretary of the Navy in 1841. His grandfather Charles Simms was an officer in the American Revolution and mayor of Alexandria, Virginia. His half-sister Emily married naval officer French Forrest.

== Career ==
=== United States Navy ===
On 9 October 1839, Simms enlisted as a midshipman in the United States Navy. In February 1840, he was a midshipman on the USS United States (1797). From May 1840 to at least August 1842, he was a midshipman on the USS Potomac (1822). In 1843, he was a midshipman on the USS Truxtun (1842). In 1846, he served on the USS Marion as acting master. In 1850, he was a midshipman on the survey schooner Ewing under William Pope McArthur. In 1851, he was acting master on the steamer USS Massachusetts (1845). In 1853, he was a midshipman on the steamer USS Vixen (1846). He was promoted to master in May 1854.

On 12 August 1854, Simms was promoted to the rank of lieutenant. In 1855, he was placed in command of the USS Release under Henry J. Hartstene to search for Dr. Elisha Kent Kane during the Hartstene expedition. In 1857, he sailed for China on the USS Minnesota (1855) commanded by Samuel Francis DuPont.

=== Confederate States Navy ===
In April 1861, Simms resigned his commission with the U.S. Navy. He briefly served in Virginia's Navy before serving in the Confederate States Navy. In July 1861, he became the commander of the steamer CSS George Page under Samuel Barron. He was also assigned to the steamer CSS Rappahannock. By August 1861, he returned to the steamer CSS Richmond. In September 1861, he was stationed near Aquia Creek. He was commander of the Richmond by the end of October 1861 and assisted Franklin Buchanan with setting up the defenses of the Rappahannock River. In November 1861, Simms was transferred to serve on the CSS Virginia (formerly the USS Merrimack (1855)) under French Forrest. In 1861, he became commander of the newly converted gunboat CSS Appomattox. In early February 1862, they were engaged at the Battle of Roanoke Island. A few days later, they were routed at the Pasquotank River. After trying to escape through the Dismal Swamp Canal, Simms set fire to the ship because its beam was two inches too wide for passage. The ship subsequently exploded. In February 1862, Simms and his friend John Taylor Wood trained their gun crews on the CSS Confederate States (formerly the USS United States) while the Virginia was under construction. He served on the Virginia during its fight with the USS Cumberland (1842) on 8 March 1862, at the Battle of Hampton Roads, he manned the pivot gun, a 7-inch Brooke rifle. After the Virginia rammed a hole in the bow of the Cumberland, Simms shot through the opening and killed all or most of a gun crew and disabled their gun. He was injured aboard the Virginia.

In February 1864, Simms replaced Julian M. Spencer as commander of the CSS Baltic. The state of Georgia gave the Baltic to the navy in a poor state. Simms described the ironclad in a letter as "rotten as punk" and that it was "as fit to go into action as a mud scow". By June 1864, it was labeled as unseaworthy. He served in the gunboats CSS Nansemond on the James River and the CSS Selma in Mobile Bay.

During the American Civil War's final year, Simms was assigned to the Mobile Squadron. By July 1864, he had attained the rank of first lieutenant and was made commander of the CSS Nashville. He left command of the Nashville in November 1864 and was ordered to Selma, Alabama. He helped construct guns and navy monitors in Selma under Catesby ap Roger Jones. In early May 1865, he surrendered to Union forces and was paroled afterwards.

=== After the Civil War ===
In 1874, Simms became a clerk of D.C.'s health department, serving under Smith Townshend.

== Personal life ==
Simms married Elizabeth James Nourse, daughter of Charles Josephus Nourse, on 18 November 1852. They had two sons, Charles Nourse and Richard Douglass.

Simms died of heart disease at his home on 32nd street in Georgetown on 18 December 1884. He was buried in Rock Creek Cemetery in Washington, D.C.
