= USS Advance (1847) =

Brigantine in the United States Navy

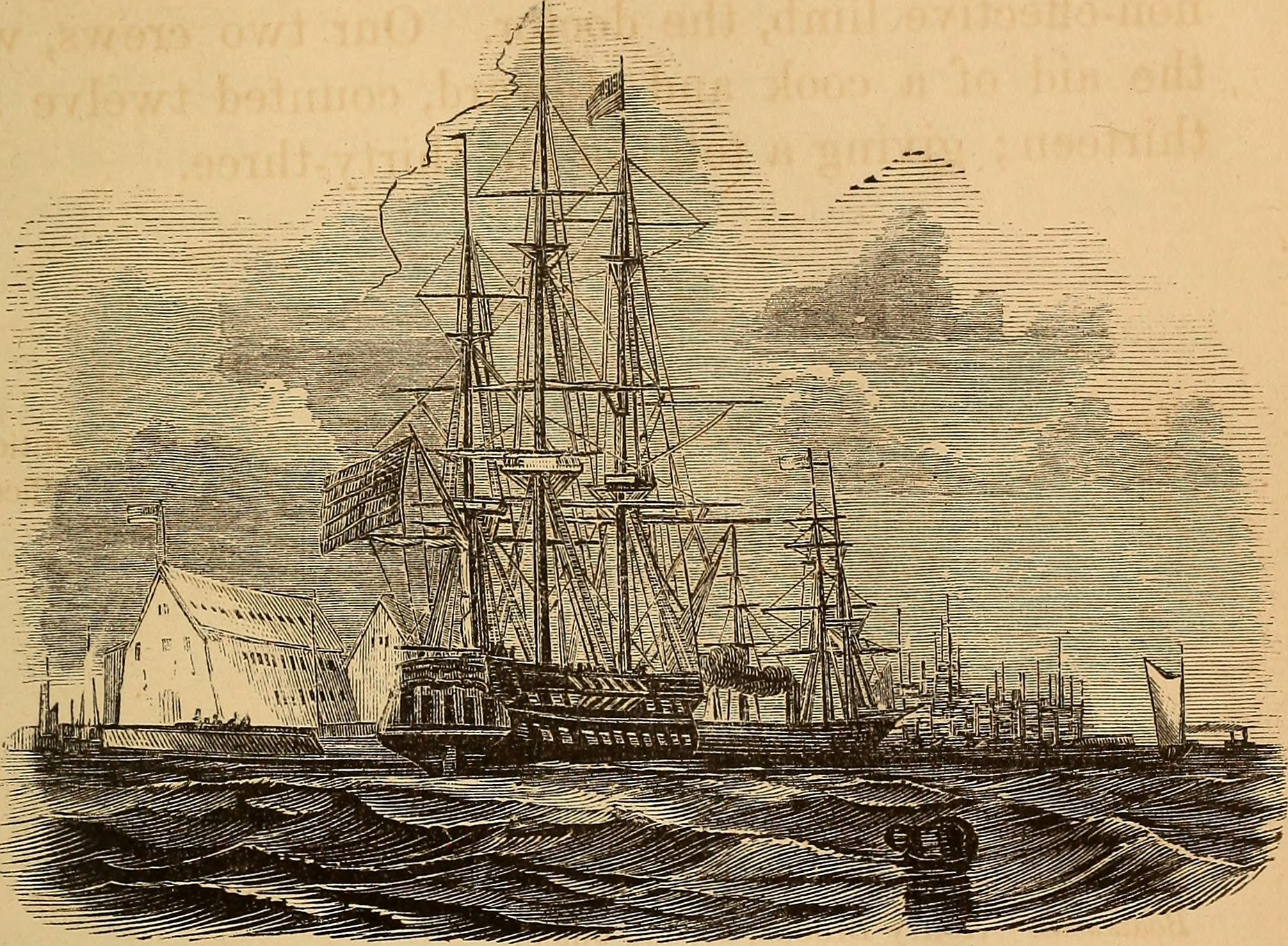
- Advance in the foreground in 1850, following USS Rescue at the Brooklyn Navy Yard

History

United States
- Name: USS Advance
- Launched: 1847
- Acquired: on loan, 1850
- Fate: Abandoned in the Arctic, 1855

General characteristics
- Type: Brigantine
- Tonnage: 144 long tons (146 t)
- Length: 88 ft (27 m)
- Beam: 21 ft 9 in (6.63 m)
- Depth: 8 ft 5 in (2.57 m)
- Complement: 17 officers and enlisted

The first USS Advance was a brigantine in the United States Navy which participated in an Arctic rescue expedition. Advance was built in 1847 as Augusta in New Kent County, Virginia and loaned to the Navy on 7 May 1850 by Henry Grinnell to participate in the search for Sir John Franklin's Arctic expedition which had been stranded in the frozen north since 1846. After last-minute preparations, the ship, under the command of Lieutenant Edwin J. De Haven and in company with Rescue, put to sea from New York on 23 May 1850.

== First rescue expedition ==
Storms battered the two ships on the initial leg of the voyage and separated them. However, both safely reached Disko Island, located off the west coast of Greenland where Davis Strait gives way to Baffin Bay. Advance arrived on 24 June, and Rescue pulled into port three days later. On the 29th, the two ships headed into Baffin Bay, bound for Lancaster Sound located north of Baffin Island and south of Devon Island. Off Haroe Island on 1 July, Advance encountered pack ice. A week later, she and her consort were caught in the pack just north of Upernavik. For the next three weeks, the two ships fought their way through the ice. On the 29th, they cleared the pack and continued their voyage across Melville Bay to Lancaster Sound. The two ships entered the sound on 19 August and, that same day, encountered two British vessels engaged in the same mission as the Americans.

That evening, a storm blew up and separated Advance and Rescue. The next day dawned "thick and foggy," but the wind had abated. Advance began searching for her companion. By 25 August, she was off Cape Riley on Devon Island where she put ashore a landing party to search for clues to the whereabouts of the Franklin expedition. While the searchers ashore were discovering the former campsite of some unidentified party, Advance was run aground by a strong current. The British ship Prince Albert offered assistance, but Rescue showed up at about the same time. Moreover, Advance lightened her load and succeeded in hauling off by her own efforts.

On 26 August, the two ships attempted the passage of Wellington Channel to search the area north of Cape Spencer. Soon, however, they found the way north blocked by a solid mass of pack ice and prudently returned south to the vicinity of Point Innes. There, the Americans again encountered the British, along with positive evidence of the Franklin party having camped nearby. Heartened by that find and by a favorable change in weather conditions, they headed back toward Wellington Channel. At Beechy Island, all the search vessels gathered in a cove (later called Union Bay) to plan a coordinated search. While the leading officers were so engaged, a party sent ashore discovered three graves and "other unmistakable evidences of the missing expedition (Franklin's) having passed its first winter here." At that point, she and Rescue entered Wellington Channel to pursue the search, but the pack ice quickly closed in upon the two ships. Though they tried to escape the clutches of the pack, abysmal weather foiled their attempts; and Rescue suffered a damaged rudder. By mid-September, they were caught fast in the floating ice.

For the duration of the winter, Advance and Rescue were at the mercy of the drifting floe. For what remained of September and most of October, they drifted in Wellington Channel, discovering the northern peninsula of Devon Island which they named Grinnell in honor of the expedition's benefactor. During November, changing winds carried them back and forth past Beechy Island. In December, the floe made the transit of Lancaster Sound and, on 14 January 1851, they reentered Baffin Bay. Their imprisonment, however, did not end until early June. They had passed Davis Strait in May, and the floe began to break up near the end of the first week in June. Rescue – repaired – cleared the pack on 7 June 1851. Advance followed the next day.

The expedition replenished at Disko Bay and sought to renew the search. However, the ice proved heavier than in the previous year; and prudence dictated that the mission be abandoned for the time being. Therefore, the two ships headed back to the United States. Advance arrived in New York on 30 September 1851, and Rescue reached that port on 7 October. Both ships were returned to Mr. Grinnell, and he immediately began outfitting Advance for another Arctic expedition.

== Second expedition ==
Preparations for the second Franklin rescue expedition took about 20 months. Advance finally departed New York on 30 May 1853, Passed Assistant Surgeon Elisha Kent Kane in command. The expedition stopped at Upernavik, Greenland, to purchase supplies and, most importantly, sled dogs for searches ashore and on the solidly frozen floes. Continuing north, Advance passed the length of Baffin Bay reaching Smith Sound – the northern terminus of Baffin Bay – by 7 August. Near the end of August, she reached her northernmost point – about 78°43' north latitude – in Kane Basin, named for the ship's commanding officer, Passed Assistant Surgeon Kane.

At that point, Kane decided to pass the winter among a group of islets near the Greenland coast rather than to return south to some safer harbor. By 10 September, Advance was imprisoned in the ice. The interior of the ship underwent extensive preparations for wintering farther north than any previous expedition. When that was complete, the crew began expeditions across the frozen wastes both on the Greenland shore and the frozen pack. Kane and his officers also established a scientific station to observe climatic conditions and to make astronomical calculations.

Their expeditions on foot, however, were hampered by the loss of almost all their sled dogs to disease. In the absence of animal transport, the men themselves carried out the searches and explorations on foot, serving as beasts of burden to manhandle caches of supplies to points which would allow for more distant searches in the future.

On one such expedition in late March 1854, four of the party suffered so severely from frostbite that they had to be left behind under the care of a fifth man while the remaining members of the party – too physically exhausted to do more than drag their own persons across the frozen wastes – headed back to the brig for help. The leader of that group, upon returning to the brig, volunteered to return with the rescue party as a guide. However, his own ordeal caused him to fall victim of a temporary mental disorder and prevented him from rendering any real help. It was only good luck – first in finding the advanced party's trail and then in sighting a canvas tent at the site of the disabled men's "encampment" – and their own Herculean efforts that allowed the rescue party to complete their mission. Even that success, however, was marred by the fact that two of the rescued men later succumbed to their infirmities.

Fatigue and illness of all associated with the rescue expedition prevented Kane from undertaking further searches until the end of April. During that interlude, Greenlandic Inuit arrived in the area, and Kane bartered with them for additional sled dogs. The four animals he thus obtained allowed him to fit out a single seven-dog team which greatly extended the range of their searches. In his own words, "The value of these animals for Arctic ice-travel (sic) can hardly be over-estimated (sic)." Through the ensuing summer, search parties ranged the far northern coasts of Greenland and the eastern coast of Ellesmere Island searching for evidence of Sir John Franklin's party and making notes on geography and climate.

=== Abandonment of the Advance ===
Advance's crewmen passed the second winter in a state of near hibernation. The difficulties of the previous year had sapped their strength, and their provisions were too scant to restore it. Scurvy – that dread disease of the sea – riddled their ranks to the point that Kane and one other man "... only remained to attend upon the sick, and carry on the daily work of the ship, if that name could still appropriately designate the burrow which we inhabited." The sun returned late in February 1855, and wild game followed it in March. Reasonably adequate food and the sunlight slowly brought the men back some semblance of full strength. At that point, Kane decided to abandon the ship – still frozen solidly in the floe – and make it across the ice to the Danish settlements of southern Greenland. Shortages of fuel and food, as well as the weakened condition of the crew, made that decision inescapable.

Preparations for the journey were multifaceted and complicated. Those capable of work prepared two 25-foot whaleboats and a 13-foot dinghy by mounting them on iron-shod wooden runners and then loading them with provisions. Meanwhile, Kane took the dog sled and team out to an abandoned Inuit hut located some 35 miles from the brig. There, he established an advanced depot to store provisions for the actual journey. During April and the first half of May, he made several trips carrying supplies to his makeshift way station. On 15 May 1855, he began transporting the incapacitated members of the crew to the way station. Two days later, the main group began its torturous trek across the ice hummocks with the three boat-sleds. The main party, without the assistance of dogs, managed a snail's pace of only some three and one-half miles a day. While the main group inched its way, Kane continued his more rapid trips – facilitated by the dogs – both back to the brig and to an Inuit camp located about 75 miles south of the ship. In this manner, he moved the sick to the way station, brought additional supplies from the ship, and returned from the Inuit camp with fresh game. He last visited the ship on 8 June 1855 and, by the middle of that month, all the sick gradually joined the main party then nearing Littleton Island. The mode of travel again was Kane's dog sled. During the journey south toward Cape Alexander, the party suffered numerous breaks through the ice as the spring thaw arrived. At least one man, Acting Carpenter Ohlsen, died from exposure resulting from such an incident.

By 18 June, the entire party reached open water at the edge of the floe near Cape Alexander. The journey had netted them only 81 miles in 31 days, but the numerous cutbacks and detours, necessitated by the ice hummocks, resulted in an actual trek of over 300 miles. From that point, they took to the boats. During the next phase of the journey, they alternated between runs across open water under sail and marches across frozen ice hummocks when necessary. By 21 July 1855, the men reached Cape York, the point at which they would begin the transit to Upernavik. There, they erected a rock monument in which they left information regarding their planned movements, a list of provisions on hand, and a brief summary of the expedition's findings. That project completed, Kane and his crew started out across Melville Bay. On 6 August, Kane led his exhausted party into Upernavik. They took passage from Upernavik in the Danish brig Marianne to Disko Island where they were met by the relief expedition made up of Arctic and Release under the command of Lt. Hartstene. The two relief ships brought the survivors into New York on 11 October 1855. Presumably, the pack ice eventually crushed and sank the abandoned Advance.

== See also ==
- Harstine Island, Washington for island that may be named after Lt. Hartstene
