= USS Rescue (1850) =

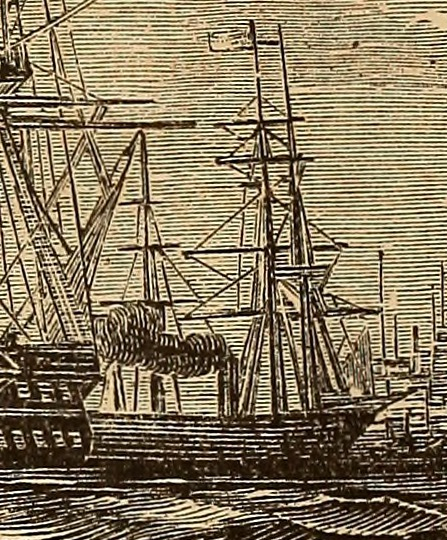
- Rescue

History

United States
- Name: USS Rescue
- In service: 1850
- Out of service: 1851
- Fate: Returned to owner

General characteristics
- Tonnage: 91 long tons (92 t)
- Complement: 16

The first USS Rescue was a brig in service with the United States Navy.

The brigs Rescue and Advance, specially reinforced and fitted out for Arctic service, were offered on loan to the U.S. Government by Henry Grinnell in 1850 for use in a rescue mission tracing the ill-fated expedition which, in May 1845, had sailed from England under Sir John Franklin seeking a northwest passage. Two years later the Admiralty dispatched relief expeditions. Since there was still no news of the expedition by 1 May 1850, the U.S. Congress authorized the President to accept Mr. Grinnell's offer. In accordance with the wishes of both Congress and Mr. Grinnell, both ships were manned by volunteers from the U.S. Navy.

On 22 May, the expedition, commanded by Lt. Edwin De Haven, sailed from New York with Rescue's captain, Acting Master Samuel P. Griffin, second in command. Sailing independently the first days out, the two ships rendezvoused at the Whalefish Islands in Disko Bay, Greenland, and on 29 June headed for Melville Bay and the northern route across Baffin Bay to Lancaster Sound. On 1 July they encountered their first pack ice off Haröe Island. On the 8th, they were caught in the ice north of Upernavik and spent the next 21 days forcing their way through the ice.

Free on the 29th, the brigs continued through the heavy floes of Melville Bay into August. On the 19th, they entered Lancaster Sound. By the 23d, Rescue was off Cape Riley, Devon Island. There, Griffin and others from his crew joined searchers from a British squadron in the discovery of a campsite previously occupied by an unknown Royal Navy party.

On the 26th, the American expedition attempted to enter Wellington Channel and search to the north of Cape Spencer. Meeting another British ship, they learned that positive evidence of the Franklin party had been found between the Cape and Point Innes. Ice, however, blocked further progress to the north, through the channel, and to the west, into Barrow Strait.

On the 27th, the search vessels, British and American, gathered in a cove, later named Union Bay, at Beechey Island to plan coordinated searches. As the commanders made their plans, a shore party discovered three graves on the island, across from Cape Riley. Franklin's first winter quarters had been found.

From that time on, however, little progress was made in the search, even though sledge parties were sent out. One such party, from Rescue, followed traces of a similar journey by a party from one of Franklin's ships, Erebus or Terror, almost to Cape Bowden. Continuing past that point, they discovered a bay which now bears Griffin's name.

During early September further attempts were made to penetrate the ice barrier to the west. On the 12th, Rescue's rudder post was split in a storm off Griffith's Island, and on the 13th the two ships, Advance towing Rescue, turned east in hopes of returning to the United States that season. On the 14th, however, they were caught, frozen, midway across the entrance to Wellington Channel. A winter of drifting began.

During September and October they drifted in the Wellington Channel, discovering in the process the northern peninsula of Devon Island which they named after Grinnell. In November they oscillated with the winds and currents near Beechey, and in December they drifted down Lancaster Sound. On 14 January 1851, they were carried into Baffin Bay. At the end of May, their imprisoning floe neared Davis Strait, and on 5 June, the ice began to break up. Rescue, repaired, parted company with Advance. On the 7th, she was free. On the 8th, Advance cleared the ice.

Both ships replenished in Disko Bay and into August attempted to renew their search. But the ice was heavier than the previous year, and neither ships nor men could have lasted through another winter. Scurvy had struck, but no one had died. A second winter in northern Baffin Bay would have brought a return of the disease and disaster.

The ships turned south. Advance reached New York 30 September 1851. Rescue followed her into port on 7 October. Both ships were subsequently returned to Mr. Grinnell, and Advance was prepared for a second Arctic expedition.

The Rescue was later sold and became the schooner Amaret, tender to the barque George Henry at the time Charles Francis Hall went to the Arctic on his first expedition in 1860. Amaret was driven ashore in a gale at Holsteinborg Harbour, Greenland on 27 September 1860, and became a total wreck.
