= USS Arctic (1855) =

United States Navy steamer

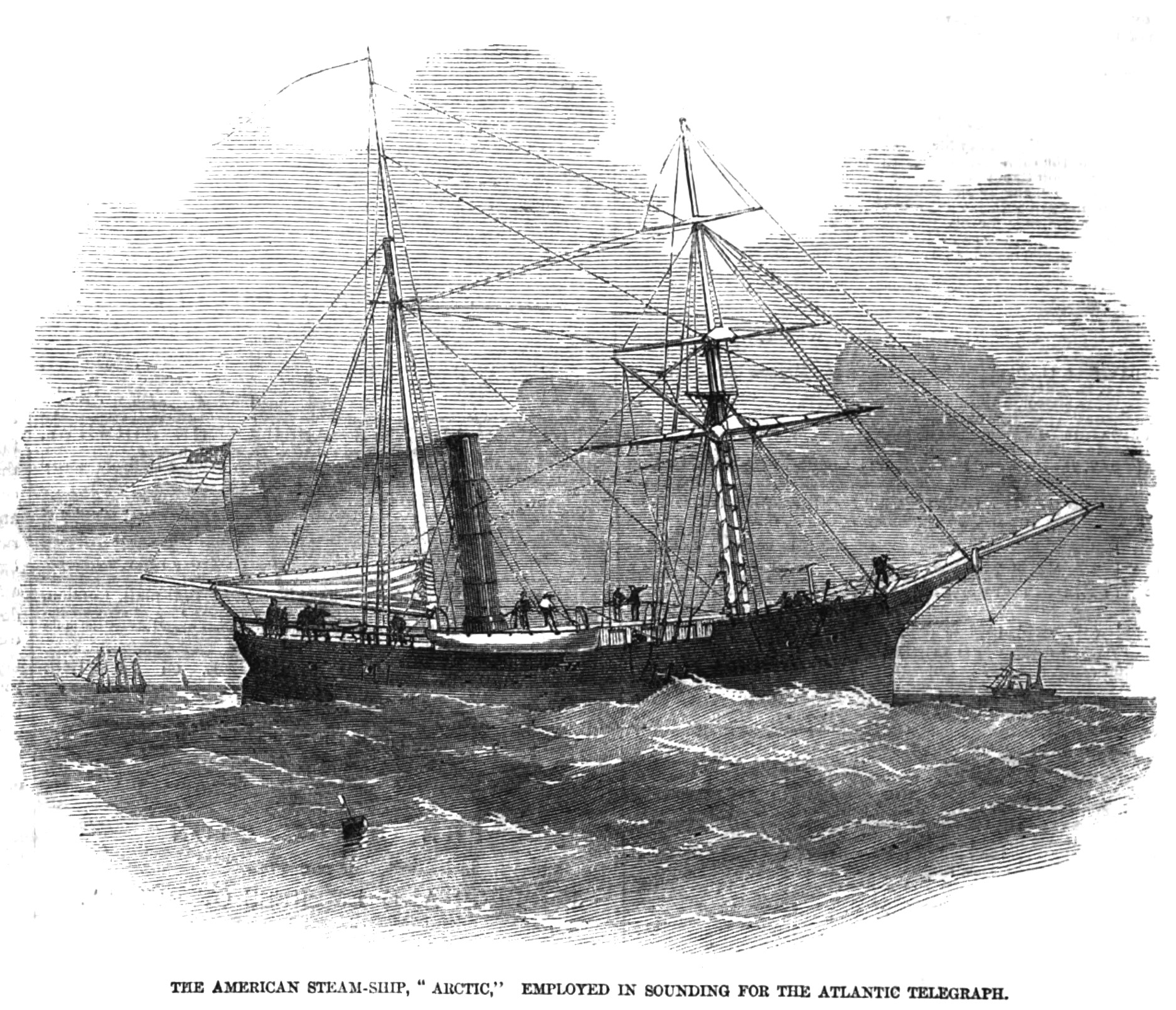
- The American steam-ship, "Arctic", employed in sounding for the Atlantic telegraph

History

United States
- Name: USS Arctic
- Namesake: The Arctic. the region of the earth above 70 degrees North latitude
- Builder: Philadelphia Navy Yard, Philadelphia, Pennsylvania
- Completed: 1855
- Commissioned: 1855
- Decommissioned: 21 October 1856
- Fate: Transferred to U.S. Coast Survey

United States Coast Survey
- Name: USCS Arctic
- Namesake: Previous name retained
- Acquired: From United States Navy 1856
- Commissioned: 1856
- Decommissioned: early 1858
- Fate: Transferred to U.S. Navy early 1858

United States
- Name: USS Arctic
- Acquired: From U.S. Coast Survey early 1858
- Commissioned: early 1858
- Decommissioned: early 1859
- Fate: Transferred to U.S. Lighthouse Board early 1859

United States Lighthouse Board
- Acquired: From U.S. Navy early 1859
- Fate: Sold 16 April 1879
- Notes: Served as lightship with steam engine removed

General characteristics (as U.S. Navy steamer)
- Type: Steamer
- Tonnage: 125 tons
- Length: 172 ft (52.4 m)
- Beam: 24 ft (7.3 m)
- Draft: 10.3 ft (3.1 m)
- Propulsion: Steam engine, one screw
- Armament: 1 × 12-pounder gun

The first USS Arctic was a steamer in commission in the United States Navy from 1855 to 1856 and from 1858 to 1859. She also served in the United States Coast Survey as a survey ship from 1856 to 1858, and with the United States Lighthouse Board as a lightship from 1859 to 1879.

Arctic was constructed by the Philadelphia Navy Yard at Philadelphia, Pennsylvania, in 1855. The U.S. Navy commissioned her for the purpose of rescuing the Arctic expedition under the command of Passed Assistant Surgeon Elisha K. Kane. She put to sea from New York City in company with USS Release on 4 June 1855. The two ships found Kane and his men at Disko Island in Baffin Bay, off the west coast of Greenland, where they had arrived after a hazardous 84-day journey over pack ice and through water in open boats. Arctic and Release returned to the United States with Kane and his party aboard in the autumn of 1855.

In July 1856, Arctic returned to sea to make depth soundings in preparation for the laying of the first transatlantic telegraph cable. By late in the month, she was at St. John's in the Dominion of Newfoundland, where she began her series of soundings. She arrived at Queenstown (now Cobh) in Ireland on 23 August 1856. On her return voyage, Arctic completed more soundings for the cable before arriving at Sr. John's on 30 September 1856. She then moved from St. John's back to New York, where she was decommissioned on 21 October 1856.

Arctic was commissioned into the U.S. Coast Survey, and in 1857 and early 1858 she made further cable soundings in the Atlantic Ocean. Recommissioned into U.S. Navy service, she cruised the waters around Cuba between May and July 1858 in company with an American naval squadron sent there to protect American merchant ships from British cruisers still practicing their so-called right of visit and search.

Early in 1859, Arctic's propulsion machinery was removed, and she was turned over to the U.S. Lighthouse Board for duty as a lightship. After 20 years of lightship service off the coast of North Carolina, she was sold at public auction on 16 April 1879.

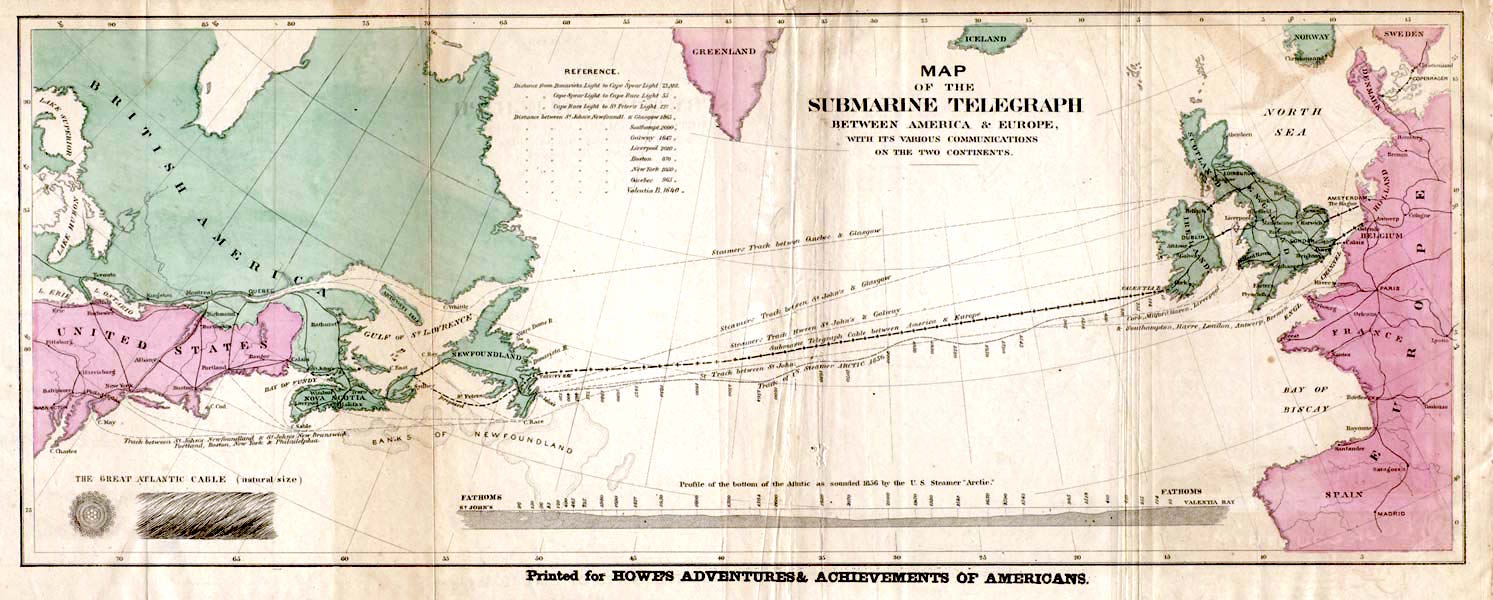
Map of the 1858 trans-Atlantic cable route including soundings taken by Arctic
