= First Grinnell expedition =

Historical US exploration campaign

The First Grinnell expedition of 1850 was the first American effort, financed by Henry Grinnell, to determine the fate of the lost Franklin Northwest Passage expedition. Led by Lieutenant Edwin De Haven, the team explored the accessible areas along Franklin's proposed route. In coordination with British expeditions, they identified the remains of Franklin's Beechey Island winter camp, providing the first solid clues to Franklin's activities during the winter of 1845, before becoming icebound themselves.

== Preparation ==
By 1850, three British rescue attempts had already failed to locate Franklin. In April and December 1849, Lady Jane Franklin sent appeals to American President Zachary Taylor that the search continue. When Congress lingered in passing the appropriations to purchase vessels, American merchant Henry Grinnell purchased two brigs, the 91-ton USS Rescue and 144-ton USS Advance, refitted them for Arctic service and offered them to the government, who quickly provided additional funds and volunteer Naval officers and crew. The expedition was instructed to focus on the areas of the Wellington Channel and Cape Walker as conditions permitted. Elisha Kent Kane was brought in from field work in Florida to serve as surgeon aboard the Advance, and Captain Donald Manson was brought on as ice master aboard the Sophia. Preparation was managed quickly, and the expedition set out on May 22, 1850, from the Navy Yard at New York.

== The voyage ==
Sighting Greenland on June 20, the expedition made harbor at the Crown Prince Islands (Whale Fish) in Disco Bay. From a British mail ship, they learned that British relief efforts were heading for the same region. Advance and Rescue left the islands on June 29, encountering the ice field on July 1, while proceeding towards Upernavik. By July 7, the pack ice was dense enough to compel the Advance to tow the Rescue to prevent the vessels from becoming separated. The crews were periodically sent onto the ice to 'bore' a passage by hand, using crowbars, ice anchors and boathooks. For 21 days the ships were held nearly fast, only heaved slowly forward by efforts of the crew.

Finally freed of the pack ice on July 28, the expedition sailed across Melville Bay, amid persistent ice bergs. As August began, food supplies were supplemented by hunting the returning auks and the occasional polar bear. On August 10, a wind change forced both ships to tie in and ride out dangerous pressure heaves as the ice closed in. After casting off to open water the next day, steady progress northward was made along the coast towards Lancaster Sound where they encountered Inuit hunters near Cape York, at nearly 76° north. Crews occasionally made short trips inland for hunting and observation.

== Traces of Franklin ==
On August 18, the expedition made contact with British ship Lady Franklin under Captain William Penny, embarked on their own Franklin rescue mission. News of other concurrent British expeditions was exchanged. On the 21st, they encountered the Felix, under the command of Sir John Ross. On the 22nd, they met with Captain Forsyth aboard the Prince Albert, who suggested a joint sledge search of the lower Boothian and Cockburne lands. Discovery of a cairn left two days earlier by Assistance and Intrepid at Cape Riley, Devon Island, indicated that traces of British encampments had been found at the cape, and also at Beechey Island. The Rescue under Captain Griffin, had shared in this discovery with Captain Ommanney.

At Cape Riley, remnants of stone walls were found, presumably to support Franklin's tents. Remains of cases from salted meat as well as articles of clothing and boat fragments were found. No previous expeditions were known to have camped here. De Haven observed that the ice of Wellington Channel had every indication of having remained unbroken for several years previous. The joint team proceeded to Beechey Island on the 26th, meeting Captain Penny's ships Lady Franklin and Sophia. Penny was accompanied by R. Anstruther Goodsir, the brother of Harry Goodsir, an assistant surgeon missing with Franklin's group. Other remains, including containers with London labels, newspapers from 1844, and papers signed by Franklin's officers, were tracked from the cape.

By now, the expeditions of Ross and Penny were in the area of the Advance and Rescue. Coordinated search plans were being made when a land party at Beechey Island reported the discovery of graves. The three graves were marked by traditional wooden markers and protected by slabs of limestone, facing Cape Riley.

== Icebound ==
Winter storms soon separated the ships, including Rescue, which was driven south out to sea. The Advance made for the relative shelter of Griffith's Island, to be joined by some of the others. The Rescue had regained control to the south, and De Haven, judging that the expedition had not reached a point from which the search could be resumed, decided to attempt a return of both ships home with the information gathered. The ice thickened, however, and the two ships were soon caught fast in Wellington Channel at roughly 75°24' north. De Haven named the mountains to the distant north "Grinnell Land", which was later determined to be a peninsula of Devon Island. The heavy ice nipped at the vessels and the floe dragged both ships northward as seasonal darkness began to set in.

By October 1, the two ships were prepared for the long winter, with the upper decks covered, sails stacked and stove pipes set. An emergency depot of provisions was cached on the nearest shore. Periodically violent ice movements threatened both ships, which drifted north or south as dictated by the wind. Lard lamps kept the cabin temperatures just above freezing. Several crew members began showing early signs of scurvy, against which Kane hunted seals and foxes to provide fresh meat. Curious foxes were tamed to amuse the crew. Full winter preparations were completed by November 9, with the ships now in the vicinity of Beechey Island and temperatures generally below zero.

As December began, the crew made preparations for abandoning the vessels in an emergency, preparing supplies and readying sledges. The ice continued to grind the brigs. On December 7, dangerous conditions forced the desertion of the Rescue, with her crew brought on board the Advance. The Advance was lifted by the ice, and crews were periodically sent out to pry the ice away from the bow, while the vacant Rescue was being slowly torn apart just 50 yards (46 m) away. The floe continued drifting, now to the southeast towards new ice hazards in Baffin Bay. Griffin led the practice of evacuation drills and snow was packed around the Advance as insulation from the increasing cold. Eight of the crew now displayed the blackened gums of scurvy as morale declined in the perpetual Arctic night, despite an improvised Christmas theatrical.

The year 1851 began at the edge of Baffin Bay, with temperatures generally around −25 °F (−32 °C) as daylight began its return. On January 13, the ice activity increased amid fierce winds, and supplies cached on the ice were lost while the situation of the Rescue became more dire. The tedium of February was broken by occasional games of football on the ice, and more theatricals at night. The symptoms of scurvy advanced, and rations of fresh food were increased, but to little avail. On the 22nd, the coldest temperature of the voyage was noted at −53 °F (−47 °C).

As March began, the decision was made to refit the Rescue for service, including hull repairs in a drydock carved from the surrounding ice. The increased daylight, exercise and liberal rations of sauerkraut and lime juice began to reduce the symptoms of scurvy among the crew. The movement of the ice packs slowed, until the ships were held around 72° north. At mid-March, the ice began to break up and wildlife began to return amid heavy snows. April brought some open water as the crew began salting the ice around the two brigs. On April 22, the crew of the Rescue completed their return to their ship, surprised that the brig had survived the winter after all.

== Breakout ==
By mid-May, efforts to weaken the ice at the ships with long saws began to show results as the ice floe approached Cape Searle. Slabs of ice were cut from the mass surrounding the ships and winched away. Fresh meat from bird hunting and an occasional polar bear strengthened the crews. The open water crept closer to the ships, but remained tantalizingly out of reach. The break-up of the ice flow finally released the ships on June 5, 1851, after drifting some 1,050 miles (1,690 km); the stern of the Advance was still held aloft by a last large table of ice. Ice saws were used, but gunpowder for blasting could not be spared. These efforts were ineffective, as the ice also firmly held the rudder of the brig. This ice violently released the Advance on June 8, after which both ships made sail through a labyrinth of ice. They reached the Whale Fish Islands on June 16, and recuperated for five days with the Inuit at Godhavn before setting out north to resume their search for Franklin.

By June 24, they encountered the pack ice again and slowly made their way towards Upernavik. Hunting and visiting with the local Inuit passed the time until they harbored at a Danish settlement in early July. Setting out as the ice cleared, they encountered British whalers, exchanging news, mail, and fresh provisions before briefly visiting Upernavik. Nearby, they again met and joined forces with the Prince Albert, still searching for Franklin. The three ships made slow progress northward though the ice fields over the next weeks, before the way was blocked entirely. On August 5, the Prince Albert abandoned the situation, heading south through the pressing ice. Rescue and Advance continued their efforts to reach the search areas of the open waters of Wellington Channel as the summer season faded early. They slowly cut north, yard by yard, through the increasingly violent pack ice, as larger icebergs drifted in and calved still more loose ice. By August 17, they had pulled themselves to open water for the first time in nearly a month, and De Haven resolved to return home before winter caught them again. Upernavik was reached on August 23. They were met by Henry Grinnell at New York on September 30, 1851, to whom both ships were returned.

== Conclusions ==
In his official report, De Haven concluded that Franklin had probably made north for an unknown open sea following the winter near Beechy Island. Ultimately, it would be determined that the opposite was true, and that Franklin had continued south according to his original orders. De Haven, despondent over the premature conclusion of the expedition, regarded the voyage "with sad hearts that our labours had served to throw so little light upon the object of our search."

In 1853, Kane led the Second Grinnell expedition, failing to locate any new information regarding Franklin and ultimately abandoning the Advance to the ice.
