= CSS Baltic =

Ironclad of the Confederate States Navy

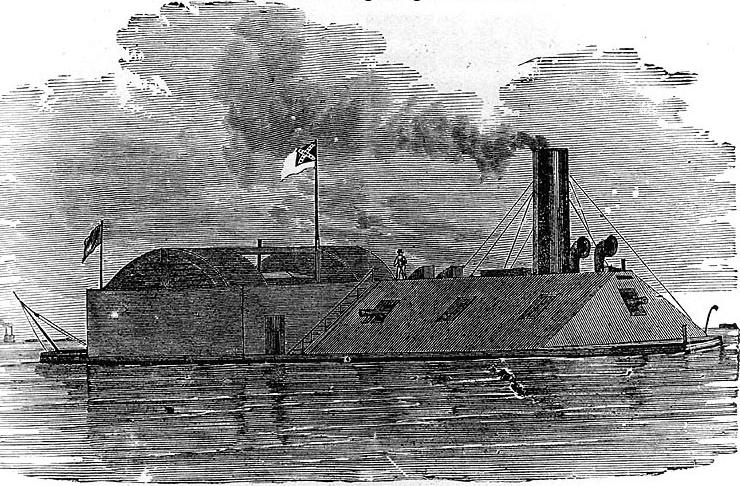
- Contemporary engraving of the vessel. The accuracy of the image is not known.

History

Confederate States
- Name: Baltic
- Launched: 1860
- Commissioned: May 1862
- Decommissioned: July 1864
- Captured: May 10, 1865
- Fate: Sold, December 31, 1865

General characteristics (post-conversion)
- Type: Casemate ironclad
- Tonnage: 624
- Length: 186 ft (56.7 m) (o/a)
- Beam: 38 ft (11.6 m)
- Draft: 6 to 7 ft (1.8 to 2.1 m)
- Installed power: 4 × horizontal return-flue boilers
- Propulsion: 2 × steam engines
- Speed: 5 knots (9.3 km/h; 5.8 mph)
- Complement: 86 officers and men
- Armament: 2 × Dahlgren guns, 2 × 32-pounders, 2 × smaller pieces
- Armor: 2.5 in (64 mm)

CSS (Note: "Confederate States Ship") Baltic was an ironclad warship that served in the Confederate States Navy during the American Civil War. A towboat before the war, she was purchased by the state of Alabama in December 1861 for conversion into an ironclad. After being transferred to the Confederate Navy in May 1862 as an ironclad, she served on Mobile Bay off the Gulf of Mexico. Baltic's condition in Confederate service was such that naval historian William N. Still Jr. has described her as "a nondescript vessel in many ways". Over the next two years, parts of the ship's wooden structure were affected by wood rot. Her armor was removed to be put onto the ironclad CSS Nashville in 1864. By that August, Baltic had been decommissioned. Near the end of the war, she was taken up the Tombigbee River, where she was captured by Union forces on May 10, 1865. An inspection of Baltic the next month found that her upper hull and deck were rotten and that her boilers were unsafe. She was sold on December 31, and was likely broken up in 1866.

== Background and description ==
During the early 19th century, a large cultural divide had developed between the northern and southern regions of the United States primarily over slavery, which was mainly a southern institution. Northerner Abraham Lincoln won the 1860 presidential election, and due to his anti-slavery position a number of southern states seceded in late 1860 and early 1861, forming the Confederate States of America; by April 1861, the American Civil War had commenced.

From the beginning of the conflict, the Confederates were at a distinct disadvantage compared to the Union Navy due a lack of available ships, infrastructure, and manufacturing capabilities. Control of the Confederate coastline was important because the Union's Anaconda Plan intended to blockade the Confederacy to cut off trade, including imported armaments. After Union victories at the Battle of Forts Hatteras and Clark and the Battle of Port Royal in late 1861, both the Confederate government and the individual Confederate states became more concerned with coastal defense.

Baltic was built in 1860 at Philadelphia, Pennsylvania. (Note: According to naval historian Saxon Bisbee, Baltic was built in 1856 at New Albany, Indiana, for ship captain William Bragdon. Bisbee writes that the hull was constructed by William Jones, and that the machinery was built by the firm of Lent, South, and Shipman.) Little is known about her, and naval historian Saxon Bisbee describes her as "one of the most obscure Confederate ironclads" and states that "Confederate documents relating to the vessel are almost nonexistent". According to Bisbee, the vessel was taken to Mobile, Alabama, after her construction by Bragdon, but the Dictionary of American Naval Fighting Ships (DANFS) says that she was built for the Southern Steamship Company. She was used as a towboat and as a cotton lighter in Mobile Bay off the Gulf of Mexico.

On November 8, 1861, the Alabama General Assembly passed legislation appropriating $150,000 for an ironclad that could serve as both a gunboat and as a ram. The state government formed a commission to select a vessel for conversion, and the sidewheel steamer Baltic was bought on December 13 at a cost of $40,000. The process of converting her into a casemate ironclad began on December 22 and enlarged the ship's dimensions, increasing the length to 186 feet (56.7 m), the beam to 38 ft (11.6 m), and her tonnage to 624 tons. (Note: No surviving document specifies Baltic's exact type of tonnage.) To allow her hull to carry the extra weight of the armor and guns, the ship was fitted with hog chains. Bisbee states that the converted ship's draft was 7 ft (2.1 m), the DANFS and naval historian Paul Silverstone state 6 ft 5 in (2.0 m), and naval historian William N. Still Jr. provides a figure of about 6 ft (1.8 m).

The ship's propulsion machinery consisted of two single-cylinder steam engines with a bore of 22 inches (56 cm) and a 7 ft (2.1 m) stroke. These were fed by four horizontal return-flue boilers; the boilers were either 24 or 28 ft (7.3 or 8.5 m) long and had a diameter of either 36 or 40 in (0.91 or 1.02 m). The two paddle wheels were 29 ft (8.8 m) in diameter and 8 ft (2.4 m) wide. As was normal for steamboats of the time, the vessel could be powered by burning either wood or coal. Baltic had a fuel capacity of up to 75 long tons (76 t). The changes needed to convert her into an ironclad made her very slow; Silverstone and the DANFS list her speed as 5 knots (9.3 km/h; 5.8 mph), and Bisbee describes it as "not [...] more than a man's walking pace". Most Confederate ironclads were screw steamers instead of paddle steamers; Baltic was one of the few paddle steamer ironclads actually completed or converted within the Confederacy, and naval historian Raimondo Luraghi described her propulsion as obsolescent. She also had difficulty steering. She had a crew of 86, whose quarters Luraghi describes as "very poor". Confederate ironclads frequently had issues with excessive heat below deck, the emission of noxious fumes from the machinery, and poor ventilation; Baltic's crew frequently slept on dry land or in the open air.

Her bow was strengthened so that it could serve as a ram, and she was armed with six cannons: two Dahlgren guns, two 32-pounder guns, and two other pieces that Luraghi refers to as "minor" and the DANFS as "smaller". Historian Gary D. Joiner notes that the Dahlgrens were likely 9-inch (23 cm) pieces. Naval historian Donald Canney says that her armament consisted of two Dahlgrens and three 32-pounders or possibly a pair of Dahlgrens plus one 42-pounder and two 32-pounders. Baltic was armored with iron plates 7 inches (178 mm) wide and 2.5 inches (64 mm) thick that were bolted to her new wooden superstructure, although the aft portion was only protected by bales of cotton. The layout of the vessel is largely unknown. Few descriptions of Baltic post-conversion exist, and Still describes the completed product as "a nondescript vessel in many ways".

== Service history ==
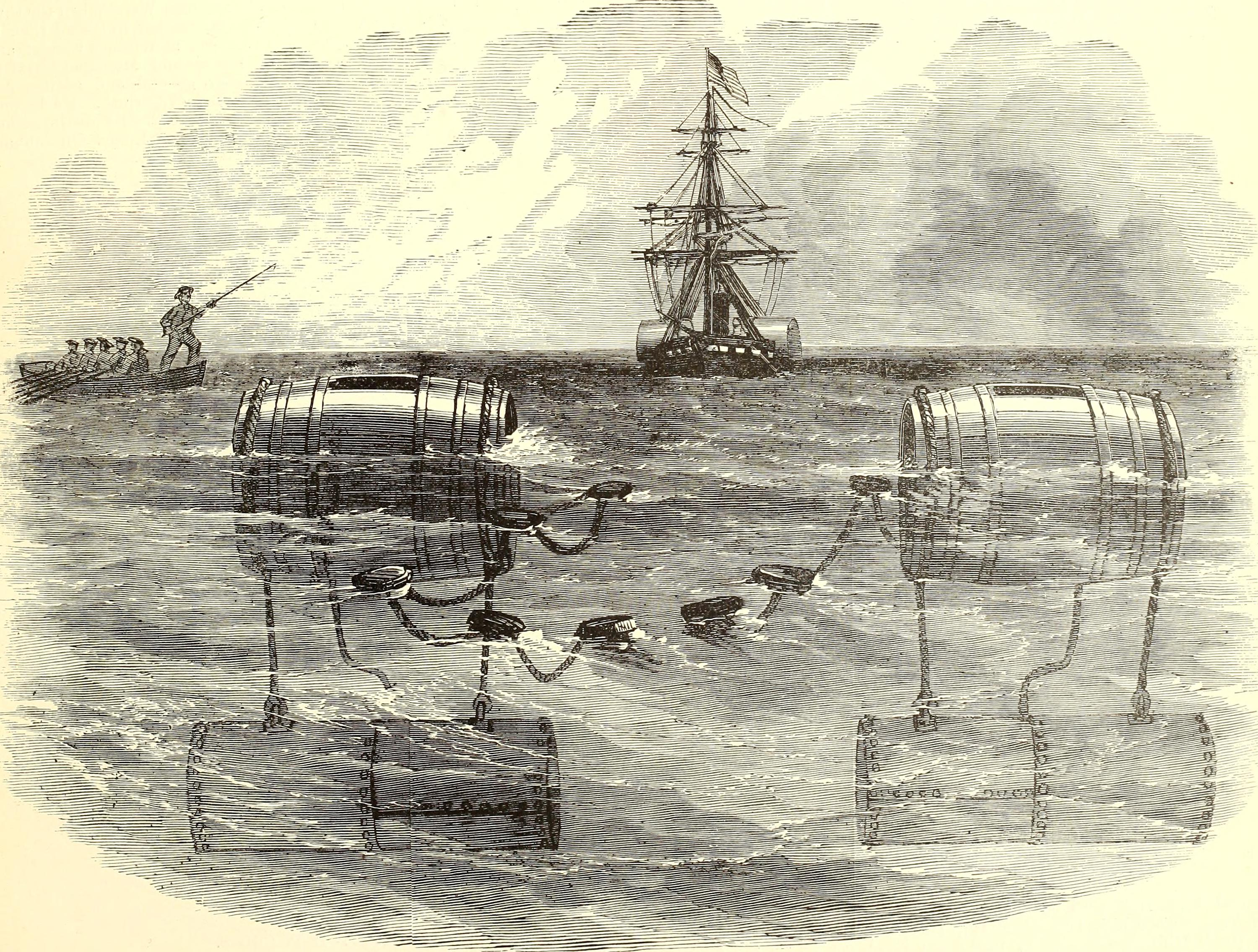
A period depiction of one type of Confederate naval mines. Baltic laid mines in Mobile Bay.

On May 12, 1862, Baltic was transferred by the State of Alabama to the Confederate States Navy. The Confederates placed her under the command of Lieutenant James D. Johnston. The vessel was formally commissioned that month. She served on Mobile Bay, the area around Mobile, Alabama, and on the Tombigbee River. By February 1863, the ship was too dilapidated for active service, and she was relegated to placing naval mines to protect Mobile Bay. Prior to CSS Tennessee's completion in February 1864, Baltic was the only Confederate ironclad on Mobile Bay. Once Tennessee was completed, Johnston was transferred to command her, and Lieutenant Charles Carroll Simms was appointed to command Baltic. Through late 1863 and early 1864, Baltic's condition worsened. By March 20, 1864, naval constructor John L. Porter had surveyed the ship's condition, judging it to be in such poor condition that he recommended that the iron be removed from her. On May 20, Simms wrote that Baltic was very rotten and was "about as fit to go into action as a mud scow".

In July, the vessel was partially dismantled, and some of her armor was removed and placed onto the ironclad CSS Nashville. After her armor was removed, Confederate naval officer John Randolph Tucker noted that engineers had declared her boilers to be unsafe and that they were having to be patched. On July 21, Simms was appointed to command Nashville, and the rest of Baltic's armor was removed to be put on Nashville. By the time of the Battle of Mobile Bay in early August, Baltic had been decommissioned. With the end of the war approaching, Baltic, Nashville, and other vessels were sent up the Tombigbee River. They were captured by Union forces on May 10, 1865, at Nanna Hubba Bluff. The next month, Union authorities surveyed Baltic and noted that below the load line she was in good condition, but that the portion of her hull above the load line and the deck were both rotten. Although the engines were in good condition at that time, the boilers were unsafe to use. The surveyors suggested that with repairs, Baltic could return to use as a towboat, but this never happened, and she was sold on December 31. Bisbee believes that Baltic was probably broken up at some point in 1866 and suggests that the ship's known poor condition and the lack of further records relating to her indicate that she was likely not used for any other purposes.

== Sources ==
- Bearss, Edwin C. (2007) [2006]. Fields of Honor: Pivotal Battles of the Civil War (1st paperback ed.). Washington, D.C.: National Geographic. ISBN 978-1-4262-0093-9.
- Bisbee, Saxon T. (2018). Engines of Rebellion: Confederate Ironclads and Steam Engineering in the American Civil War. Tuscaloosa, Alabama: University of Alabama Press. ISBN 978-0-8173-1986-1.
- Calore, Paul (2002). Naval Campaigns of the Civil War. Jefferson, North Carolina: McFarland & Company. ISBN 978-0-7864-1217-4.
- Canney, Donald L. (2015). The Confederate Steam Navy 1861–1865. Atglen, Pennsylvania: Schiffer Publishing. ISBN 978-0-7643-4824-2.
- Holmes, Richard (2001). The Oxford Companion to Military History. Oxford: Oxford University Press. ISBN 0-19-866209-2.
- Joiner, Gary D. (2011). "CSS Baltic". In Tucker, Spencer C. (ed.). The Civil War Naval Encyclopedia. Santa Barbara, California: ABC-CLIO. pp. 48–49. ISBN 978-1-59884-338-5.
- Luraghi, Raimondo (1996). A History of the Confederate Navy. Annapolis, Maryland: Naval Institute Press. ISBN 1-55750-527-6.
- Silverstone, Paul H. (1989). Warships of the Civil War Navies. Annapolis, Maryland: Naval Institute Press. ISBN 0-87021-783-6.
- Smith, Steven D. (2003) [2000]. "The Submarine H. L. Hunley: Confederate Innovation and Southern Icon". In Geier, Clarence R.; Potter, Stephen R. (eds.). Archaeological Perspectives on the American Civil War. Gainesville, Florida: University Press of Florida. ISBN 0-8130-2651-2.
- Still, William N. Jr. (1985) [1971]. Iron Afloat: The Story of the Confederate Armorclads. Columbia, South Carolina: University of South Carolina Press. ISBN 0-87249-454-3.
