= Second Grinnell expedition =

1853–1855 arctic expedition

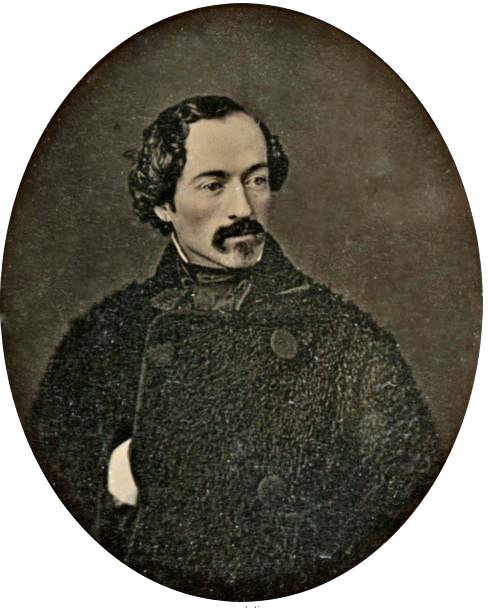
Elisha Kent Kane

The second Grinnell expedition of 1853–1855 was an American effort, financed by Henry Grinnell, to determine the fate of the Franklin's lost expedition. Led by Elisha Kent Kane, the team explored areas northwest of Greenland, now called Grinnell Land.

While failing to determine the fate of Sir John Franklin, the expedition set a new record for northward penetration, delineated 960 miles (1,540 km) of unexplored coastline north of 82° latitude, and discovered the long-sought open Polar Sea. Kane collected valuable geographical, climate and magnetic observations before abandoning the brig Advance to the pack ice in 1855. While three members of the crew were lost, the epic journey of the survivors inspired the public as a vivid tale of Arctic survival.

== Preparation ==
Retired merchant Henry Grinnell became interested in the fate of Franklin's lost expedition, which had set out to seek a Northwest Passage through the Northwest Archipelago in 1847. Encouraged by Lady Jane Franklin and soured by the inability of the national legislature to provide funding, Grinnell financed a first polar expedition, which set out from New York in May 1850 under Lieutenant Edwin De Haven on the brigs USS Rescue and USS Advance. Elisha Kent Kane served as senior surgeon aboard the Advance.

The vessels returned without resolving the mystery, although, in coordination with an expedition led by Captain William Penny, they discovered Franklin's first wintering camp (and three graves) at Beechey Island on August 24, 1850. Undeterred, Grinnel equipped the 144-ton brig Advance for a second voyage under Dr. Kane on behalf of the U.S. Navy to search for Franklin north of Beechey Island and a likely open summer Polar sea. With additional support from the Geographical Society of New York (which approved the plan of search), The Smithsonian Institution, the American Philosophical Society, and $10,000 from George Peabody, the expedition set out from New York on May 30, 1853 with a small crew, modest provisions, barter items and scientific instruments.

== Voyage and exploration ==
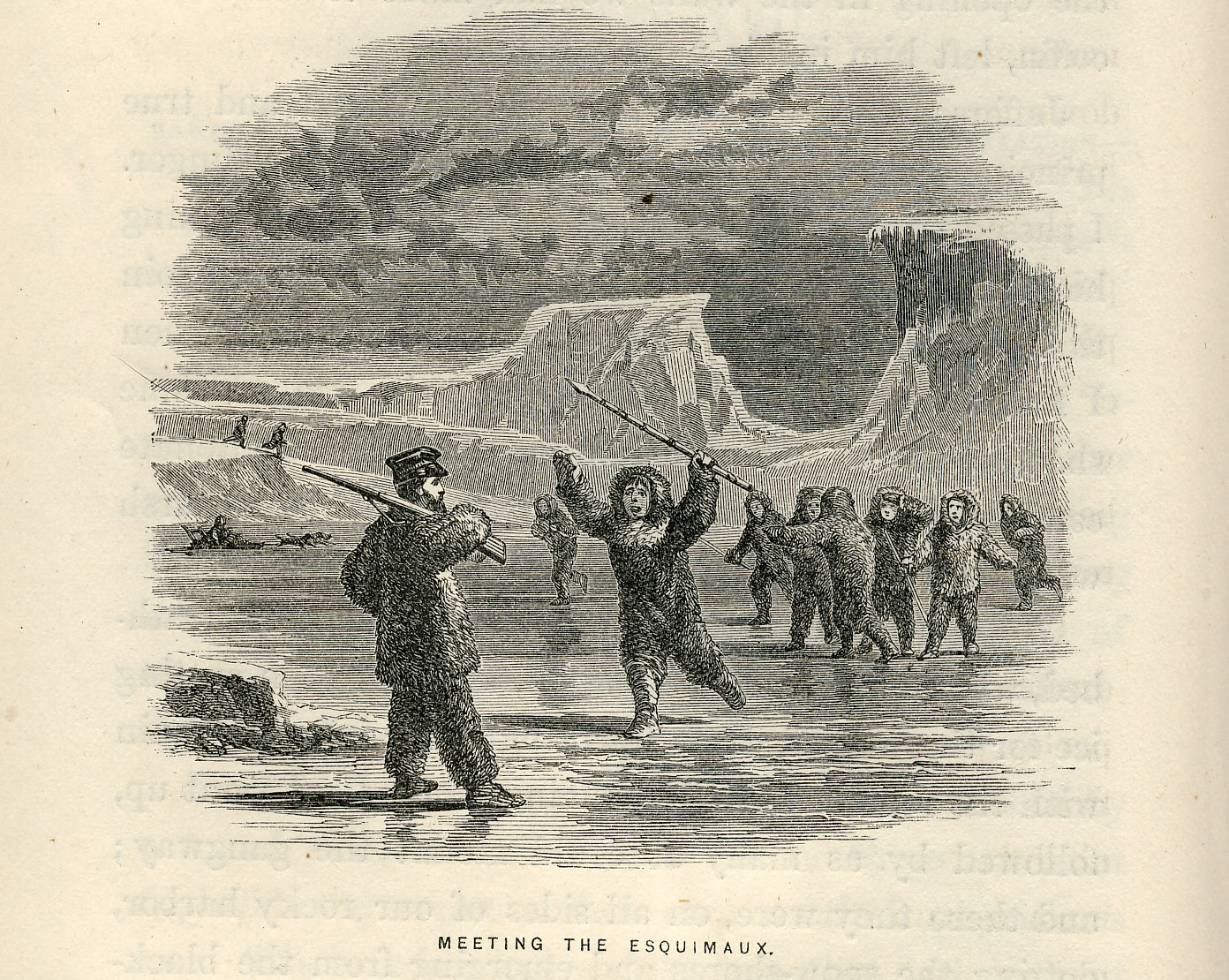
Meeting the Esquimaux

By July 1853, the Advance had reached the northern Danish settlements at Fiskenaesset and Upernavik Greenland, and there acquired additional provisions, interpreter Karl Petersen, and a 19-year-old Kalaallit hunter and dog handler named Hans Hendrik. Navigation of the sea ice through Melville Bay in early August was facilitated by tethering the vessel to northeast-bound icebergs, with Kane leaving a cairn on Littleton Island. By August 23, they had reached a position of 78° 41′, among the farthest northward penetrations by sea in the Baffin Bay region. Several sled trips were made inland to Greenland to establish supply depots and make observations, reaching 78° 52′, before the Advance was set for winter in Rensselaer Harbor on September 10.

During the dark winter, a small stone observatory was established ashore, and several overland trips by dog sled were undertaken, arranging additional supply depots and performing geographical observation, reaching as far as 79° 50′ north. The crew entertained themselves, held theatrical events, published an Arctic newspaper called The Ice-Blink, and maintained the sled dogs. By March, the outside temperatures averaged around −46 °F (−43 °C), having reached a winter low of −67 °F (−55 °C) on February 5, 1854. By the end of winter, most of the sled dogs had died of a progressive ailment resembling lockjaw, and much of the crew were exhibiting signs of scurvy.

On March 20, a depot party set out, with temperatures slightly improving. Late on March 30, three of the party (Sonntag, Ohlsen and Petersen) returned to the Advance in a weakened state, requesting the immediate rescue of the remaining four, Brooks, Baker, Wilson, and Pierre. Ohlsen was brought to guide them back, but ultimately Hans tracked the frozen men's sledge trail after an unbroken march of 21 hours. Despite the hardships of exhaustion, high winds, and temperatures of −55 °F (−48 °C), the party was able to return to the Advance. Still, Jefferson Baker later died – the rescue party had been out for 72 hours and travelled nearly 90 miles (140 km).

On April 26, after trading with a group of Inuit hunters at the brig, teams under Kane, McGary and Godfrey set out with fresh dogs for the Humboldt Glacier, hoping to reach the American side via their earlier cache depots. Once there, they planned to search the far ice for possible channels and to make observations. Despite crossing Marshall Bay, scurvy and poor travelling conditions slowed their progress until May 4, when they discovered that polar bears had spoiled their advanced supply depots. When Kane succumbed to illness, the party turned back, reaching the brig on May 14. Peter Schubert perished on the return trip, and his remains were placed in the observatory with those of Baker.

While the others recovered, Dr. Hayes set out on a dogsled journey making north for Cape Sabine on May 20 as temperatures rose to above freezing. He returned on June 1 after surveying the Greenland coast. On June 3, McGary and Morton set out on coastal expeditions along the Kennedy Channel (reaching as far as 81 degrees north, at Morris Bay), returning later that month, having been troubled by polar bears, bear-destroyed supply caches and melting ice. As temperatures continued to rise, the remaining crews made several short trips of observation, noting the migratory birds and employing the returning vegetation as a cure for their persisting scurvy.

By early July 1854 Kane was considering the possibility of another winter locked in the ice measured against the fact that they were not provisioned for another year. The option of abandoning the Advance was considered dishonorable at best. Kane and five men undertook an attempt in a modified 23-foot (7.0 m) whaleboat to reach Beechey Island, where Kane, as part of the first Grinnel expedition, had located the 1845 winter camp of the Franklin expedition. There, Kane hoped to meet Sir Edward Belcher's rescue expedition and their supplies.

Thwarted by a heavy gale and pack ice, they sailed and manhauled the craft, only to be stopped by the ice on July 31, just 10 miles (16 km) from Cape Parry. They were forced to return to the ice-locked Advance. Blasting the pack ice briefly freed the brig on August 12, but she became set fast in an ice floe as the crew hoped for a breakup while their supplies waned. Expecting the worst, documents were cached at the observatory, with a large stone painted with "Advance, A.D. 1853–1854" as a marker.

== Icebound ==
On August 23, Kane knew that the Advance would not be freed. Although eight of the seventeen survivors resolved to stay with the brig and hope for survival through the winter, the other eight set out on the 28th for Upernavik, although one returned to the brig the next day. Those that remained with Kane on the Advance quickly began winter preparations. Those staying with Kane were Brooks, McGary, Wilson, Goodfellow, Morton, Ohlsen, Hickey and the Inuk, Hans Christian.

Taking lessons from the Inuit, Kane and his men spent early September insulating the deck with moss and turf, and doing likewise below deck. The outer decks were stripped, providing over seven tons of firewood for heat and melting of snow. Such preparations kept the temperature below decks between 36 and 45 °F (2 and 7 °C), even during the colder months. An agreement was reached with the nearby Inuit to provide meat in trade, and also of sharing the ship as shelter and hunting together, which strengthened their bond. Local exploration and hunting continued into early October, when the Inuit quietly left.

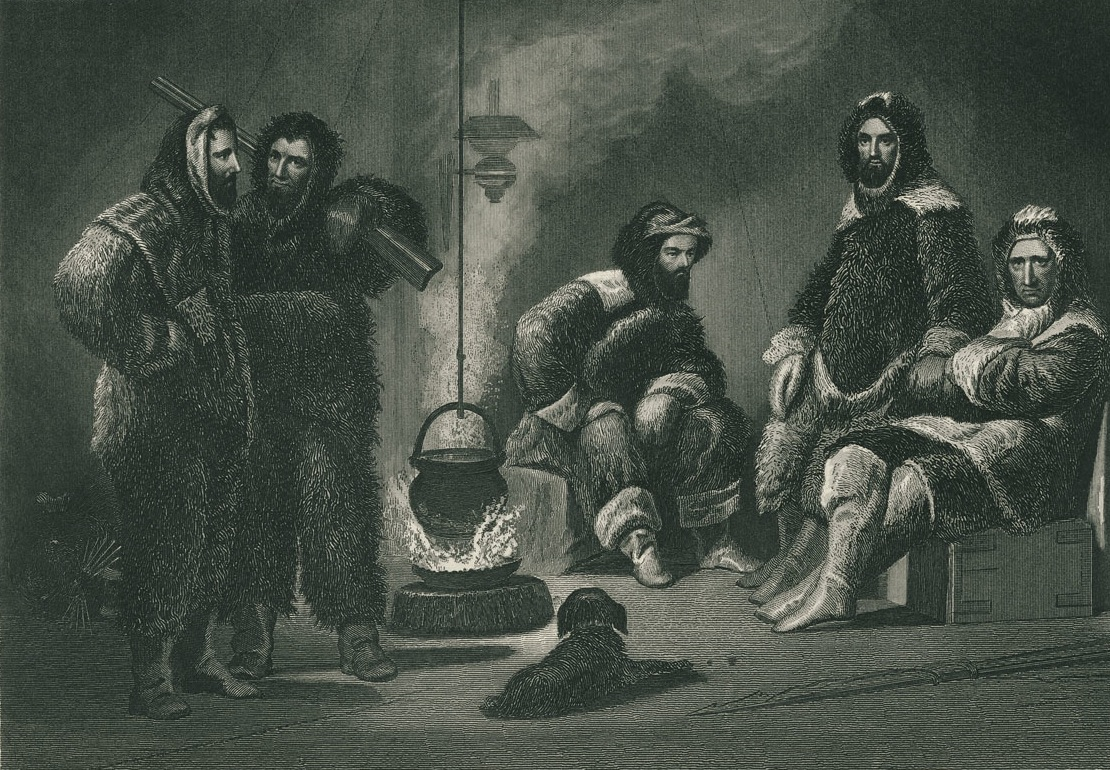
Winter of 1855 aboard the Advance with Kane in the center

Hoarding their remaining bread, beef and pork before full darkness came, they extended their winter rations with occasional polar bear, fox, hares and ultimately rats, the latter of which they shot aboard ship with bow and arrow to pass the time. Kane also experimented making root beer from willow shoots. Mid October, Morton and Hans set out by sledge to locate the Inuit, in hopes of locating hunting grounds. They reached a small seasonal settlement near Hartstene Bay, and successfully hunted walrus with their hosts, returning to the brig with meat on the 21st. The brig was periodically chain-lifted above the ice to prevent it from being crushed by the growing ice. Scurvy returned and morale fell. During these times, thoughts often returned to the fate of Franklin's party.

On December 7, a group of Inuit arrived, bearing two (Bonsall and Peterson) from the group that had set out on August 28. They reported that their situation had deteriorated, and that the rest of their party were destitute some 200 miles (320 km) away. Precious rescue supplies were sent to them, and with the help of the Inuit the remainder of Advance's crew returned on the 12th, severely weakened. The natives later returned, and enjoyed Kane's measured hospitality.

On December 23, a lamp-fire broke out in a storage room and set the dry timbers and moss walls entirely aflame. The fire was smothered with animal skins and water, but it sorely tested the crew. Kane set out soon after to obtain walrus meat from the Inuit near Cape Alexander to address the worst cases of scurvy, at best a 22-hour-journey amid high temperatures of −54 °F (−48 °C). Dogs failing, they were forced back to the brig without attaining their goal. The crew was now warmed only by their lamps. On January 22, Kane and Hans set out again, lightly equipped, prepared to expend the dogs towards the survival of their 93 miles (150 km) journey.

A storm and snow kept them locked in their waypoint, an abandoned Inuit dwelling, for two days. Health, supplies and dogs failing, they were forced again to return to the brig empty-handed on January 30, 1855. By this time, nearly all of the crew was bed-ridden with advancing scurvy, despite the unseasonably warmer temperatures above −20 °F (−29 °C). On February 3, Peterson and Hans set out for the local Inuit following a trail spotted by Kane. Three days later they returned, weakened and turned back by the increasing snows and their own failing strength.

In the following days the crew was sustained by occasional hares, caribou and flax-seed brewed 'beer,' and warmed by burning hemp cable and gear. The health of the sickest continued to deteriorate despite the gradual return of the sun as temperatures held between −40 and −50 °F (−40 and −46 °C). Hans set out to seek meat from the nearby Inuit, but they were facing famine as well. He assisted them on a successful walrus hunt, and returned on March 10 to the brig with his share of the meat, which sustained the invalids. During this period, Hans sought to visit the Inuit village of Peteravik on foot, which Kane allowed. Hans had intended to return, but was convinced to stay with his hosts, eventually moving south with them.

In late March, William Godfrey deserted, returning to the Advance on April 2, but fleeing again under fire. He was recaptured at an Inuit village by Kane on April 18 without incident.

== The escape ==
With some improvement in health, planning began for the escape to open water across the ice, which showed no sign of releasing the Advance. Partnering and hunting with the local Inuit secured walrus and bear meat, helping the crew to recover. The few remaining ship-timbers were harvested as runners for two 17.5-foot-long (5.3 m) sledges for the 26-foot-long (7.9 m) whaleboats, with bolts fashioned from curtain rods. Only four dogs remained, the rest having succumbed to illness, although some were loaned by the local natives. By early May, all but four of the crew were fairly restored in health. Kane and Morton made one last search towards the far coast of the Kane Basin, but failed to locate any sign of Franklin's party. The search operation was formally closed, with all attention focused on escape.

All effort was focused on the manufacture of equipment and clothing for the escape. As the escape planning progressed, May 17 was selected as the day for setting out. A base supply of food would be transported with the sledges, supplemented by hunting and limited dogsled trips back to the brig. The two dried out cypress whaleboats Faith and Hope were strengthened where possible with oak, fit with collapsible masts, and covered by stretched canvas. A third boat, Red Eric, was brought along as fuel. Provisions, ammunition, cooking gear, and a few precious scientific instruments were packed within these. Each man was allowed eight pounds of personal effects.

On the 17th, they set out on their 1,300 miles (2,100 km) journey, with the sledges being man-hauled by the recently invalid crew. Only two miles (3.2 km) were gained the first day, but they gradually improved in their task, recuperating aboard the Advance while it was still nearby. On May 20, 1855, When the Advance was finally left for good, the crew gathered aboard the empty brig, offered prayer, and quietly packed away a portrait of Sir John Franklin. The figurehead, "Augusta," was removed and loaded onto the sledges – for wood if not for honor. Kane addressed the crew to their accomplishments, and of the challenge before them, and they signed a resolve regarding the decision to abandon ship:

The undersigned, being convinced of the impossibility of the liberation of the brig, and equally convinced of the impossibility of remaining in the ice a third winter, do fervently concur with the commander in his attempt to reach the South by means of boats. Knowing the trials and hardships which are before us, and feeling the necessity of union, harmony, and discipline, we have determined to abide faithfully by the expedition and our sick comrades, and to do all that we can, as true men, to advance the objects in view.

Fixed to a stanchion near the gangway, Kane left a note to any who might later come upon the brig. It closed with these words:

I regard the abandonment of the brig as inevitable. We have by actual inspection but thirty-six days' provisions, and a careful survey shows that we cannot cut more firewood without rendering our craft unseaworthy. A third winter would force us, as the only means of escaping starvation, to resort to Esquimaux habits and give up all hope of remaining by the vessel and her resources. It would therefore in no manner advance the search after Sir John Franklin.

Under any circumstances, to remain longer would be destructive to those of our little party who have already suffered from the extreme severity of the climate and its tendencies to disease. Scurvy has enfeebled more or less every man in the expedition, and an anomalous spasmodic disorder, allied to tetanus, has cost us the life of two of our most prized comrades.

I hope, speaking on the part of my companions and myself, that we have done all that we ought to do to prove our tenacity of purpose and devotion to the cause which we have undertaken. This attempt to escape by crossing the southern ice on sledges is regarded by me as an imperative duty, – the only means of saving ourselves and preserving the laboriously-earned results of the expedition.

— Advance, Rensselaer Bay, May 20, 1855

The twelve able-bodied crewmen hauled each of the three sledges in turn, with an emphasis on daily routine and discipline, with Hayes and Sonntag logging the running survey. The abandoned Inuit dwelling at Annoatok served as a forward hospital while the man-haulers remained close, and additional supplies had been cached nearby. Kane ferried supplies and invalids forward by dogsled and even returned to the brig to secure additional provisions and bake fresh bread on the book-fueled stove. Halts were regulated by the condition of the men, and progress was slow and deliberate, despite 14-hour-hauls. Axes were often used to cut through ice hummocks or to cut ramps between ice layers. Health deteriorated under the burden of moving the heavy sledges across the ice, and the symptoms of scurvy began to increase, calling for increased rations. Kane's further trade with the natives improved the provisions as temperatures warmed, but the provisions packed on the boats were reserved at all costs.

Warming temperatures and melting ice added to the dangers. The sledges and boats occasionally broke through, narrowly escaping loss. In one such breakthrough on June 2, Ohlsen saved the Hope, but broke through the ice himself, rupturing a blood vessel. Although rescued, his condition was grave. While attempting to reach the Inuit settlement of Etah near Littleton Island, fierce storms held Kane's dogsled party down, forcing them to burrow into the snow before retreating. A second attempt produced meat, blubber and fresh dogs from the generous natives, whose regular assistance was invaluable. Refreshed, Kane retrieved the four invalids from their shelter at Annoatok, one by one. On June 6, after raising sails on the boat-sledges, the men took advantage of steady winds to help drive them eight miles (13 km) across the ice towards their supply cache at Littleton Island.

Hans was still missing, having not returned to the party since leaving in April, but originally planning to rendezvous at the village at Etah. From nearby villagers, Kane determined that Hans had married a maiden from Peteravik, and then ventured south to Qeqertarsuatsiaat to begin a new life. He was sorely missed by Kane's party.

The intact supply cache at Littleton Island was recovered on July 12. While on Littleton, Ohlsen finally succumbed to the illness and was buried in a natural cleft in view of the cape that bears his name. After crossing 80 miles (130 km) of ice, open water was sighted six miles (9.7 km) to the southwest, and the final push was planned.

Upon resuming their march, many natives came to assist them, helping with the hauling and offering fresh meat from the now plentiful auks. The open water was reached on June 16, 1855. After bidding the gathered natives farewell and offering gifts, including most of the remaining dogs, Kane and the survivors launched their three boats on June 19, having been delayed by another storm.

The dried, weather-beaten wooden boats began leaking, and the Red Eric was nearly lost, as they made for the protection of the pack ice inlets. They soon took refuge on Hakluyt Island and repaired the boats. They set out again on the June 22, island-hopping to Northumberland Island, then camping at Cape Parry and hunting all along the way, melting snow from the icebergs to produce water. As a result of the harsh winter, they soon encountered unbroken ice to the south. As their hope faded, a storm rose up and broke the ice floe, and they returned to the water amid the loose pack ice. Making ground on an ice shelf as the storm returned, they found that they were in the midst of an eider hatchery, and the birds and raw eggs restored their strength. They set out again on July 3, hugging the shore, but were slowed by chains of icebergs blocking their way. They persevered, and by July 11 approached Cape Dudley Digges.

The boats continued to deteriorate. Setting ashore near a glacier, they encountered numerous birds and vegetation, which supplemented their diet until setting off again on July 18, reaching Cape York on the 21st. Sighting open leads, they extended their fuel supply by breaking up the Red Eric and gathering what supplies they could. When the leads failed, the boats were again man-hauled across the ice. Rations were reduced as they made for Cape Shackleton through fog and ice as the crew's health deteriorated again. On the floes, they finally took a seal, and strength returned, with additional seals ending their famine for good.

By August 1, they had reached open whaling waters, and two days later they found English-speaking people. Kane finally reached Upernavik on August 8, 1855, having been in the open for 84 days.

== Aftermath ==
On September 6, they crew secured passage aboard the Danish vessel Mariana to the Shetland Islands, bringing the Faith along as a relic of their ordeal. Near Lively they met with the Hartstene expedition, which had set out to locate Dr. Kane that previous May. Kane's brother Dr. John K. Kane, accompanied by Lieutenant Hartstene, had learned of Kane's route from the local Inuit and pushed to within 40 miles (64 km) of the abandoned brig Advance. Both expeditions returned to New York October 11, 1855.

Kane completed his literary account of the voyage, but his health was already in decline, stating "The book, poor as it is, has been my coffin." He was joined by his family and William Morton in Cuba, where he died on February 16, 1857. His life was publicly celebrated and widely mourned.

The expedition contributed little to the efforts to determine the fate of Franklin, and concluded Grinnell's American contributions to this effort. Surgeon Hayes would launch his own Arctic expedition in 1860, which included Sonntag as astronomer and Hans Christian – a voyage that would claim Sonntag's life. The British Admiralty would continue the search for Franklin until 1880.

== Crew of the Advance ==
- Henry Brooks, first officer
- Isaac Israel Hayes, surgeon
- August Sonntag, astronomer
- John Wall Wilson
- James McGary
- George Riley
- William Morton
- Christian Ohlsen
- Henry Goodfellow
- Amos Bonsall
- George Stephenson
- George Whipple
- William Godfrey
- John Blake
- Jefferson Baker
- Peter Schubert
- Thomas Hickey
- Hans Hendrik
- Karl Petersen

== Legacy ==
The Kane Basin, named for Kane, which also includes the glacier Kane named after Alexander von Humboldt.

Kane provided the first account of the Etah Inuit, the northernmost inhabitants of the planet. Although his specimens were lost, his notes provided extensive information on the flora and fauna, and the magnetic, meteorological, tidal and glacial aspects of the extreme region of western Greenland.

Kane's party enhanced their survival through adaptation of Inuit techniques, including dogsleds, hunting, shelter, and by developing a close relation with the local natives. Such steps may have helped the Franklin expedition, which likely maintained their European behaviors throughout their ordeal. Said Kane

When trouble came to us and to them, and we bent ourselves to their habits, – when we looked to them to procure us fresh meat, and they found at our poor Oomiak-soak shelter and protection during their wild bear-hunts, – then we were so blended in our interests as well as modes of life that every trace of enmity wore away.

— Elisha Kane, The United States Grinnell Expedition in Search of Sir John Franklin

Franklin experienced several Inuit attacks in his 1826 overland expedition, which would have informed any later decisions regarding alliances with local natives.

Kane's ability to periodically obtain fresh meat, primarily in summer hunts with the Inuit, held off the most severe symptoms of scurvy. Franklin's expedition relied on the tinned foods (prepared in haste by Goldner), the poor soldering of which resulted in consistently high lead levels in the remains found to date. Lead poisoning would be a significant factor standing against their survival. While Kane's smaller party made hunting more practical, this difference was key to the respective outcomes of both expeditions.
