= USS Connecticut (1861) =

Gunboat of the United States Navy

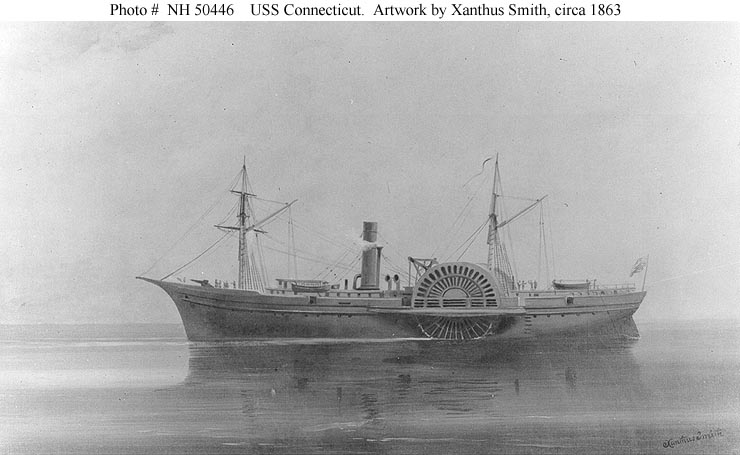
- USS Connecticut

History

United States
- Name: USS Connecticut
- Namesake: Connecticut
- Launched: 1861
- Acquired: 18 July 1861
- Commissioned: 23 August 1861
- Decommissioned: 24 November 1862
- In service: 15 December 1862
- Out of service: 11 August 1865
- Fate: Sold, 21 September 1865

General characteristics
- Displacement: 725 tons
- Length: 251 ft 6 in (76.66 m)
- Beam: 38 ft 2 in (11.63 m)
- Draft: 22 ft 8 in (6.91 m)
- Propulsion: steam engine; side-wheel propelled
- Speed: 10 knots (19 km/h; 12 mph)
- Complement: 166
- Armament: four 32-pounder guns; one 12-pounder rifled gun

USS Connecticut was a large steamer acquired by the Union Navy during the American Civil War. Her primary task was to prevent ships from penetrating the Union blockade of Southern ports.

== Service history ==
Connecticut, a side wheel steamer, was built in 1861 by William Webb, New York City; purchased by the Navy 18 July 1861; and commissioned 23 August 1861, Commander M. Woodhull in command. Connecticut sailed on her first voyage 25 August 1861, delivered men and supplies to ships on the blockade along the Atlantic and Gulf coasts as far as Galveston, Texas, and returned to New York 29 September. Following two patrols, from 16 to 24 October and from 10 November to 17 December in search of CS cruiser CSS Nashville, Connecticut returned to cargo duty, making five voyages similar to her first between 7 January and 15 November 1862. She also captured four schooners with valuable cargo during this period. Out of commission for repairs at New York from 24 November to 15 December 1862, Connecticut left in tow of USS Montauk 24 December for duty as convoy and tow ship off Aspinwall, Panama, until returning to New York 6 June 1863.

During Connecticut's next cruise, from 10 August 1863 to 25 July 1864, she operated most successfully with the North Atlantic Blockading Squadron off Virginia and North Carolina. She captured five vessels and drove a sixth ashore, abandoned and burned by its crew. Included were the English steamer Minnie, captured 9 May 1864 with a cargo of cotton, tobacco, turpentine, and gold, one of the most valuable prizes taken during the war; and the British steamer Greyhound, taken on 10 May, which carried in addition to her cargo of cotton, tobacco, and turpentine, the famous Confederate spy Belle Boyd. Following another cruise carrying men to the fleet between 30 July and 5 October 1864, Connecticut was placed out of commission at Boston, Massachusetts, from 7 October 1864 to 17 February 1865. Her last cruise from 21 February to 3 August 1865 was in the West Indies and on the U.S. East Coast, searching for Confederate privateers and towing monitors from Port Royal, South Carolina, to Philadelphia, Pennsylvania. Connecticut was decommissioned 11 August 1865 at Philadelphia Navy Yard and sold 21 September 1865.
