= Union Bay =

Union Bay may refer to:

== Places ==
- Union Bay (Alaska), US
- Union Bay (Seattle), a part of Lake Washington, Washington state, US
- Union Bay, British Columbia, a community in Canada

== Other uses ==
- Union Bay (platform), Intel's platform for the Cannon Lake die shrink of the Skylake microarchitecture
