= James D. Johnston =

American naval officer (1817–1896)

James Douglas Johnston
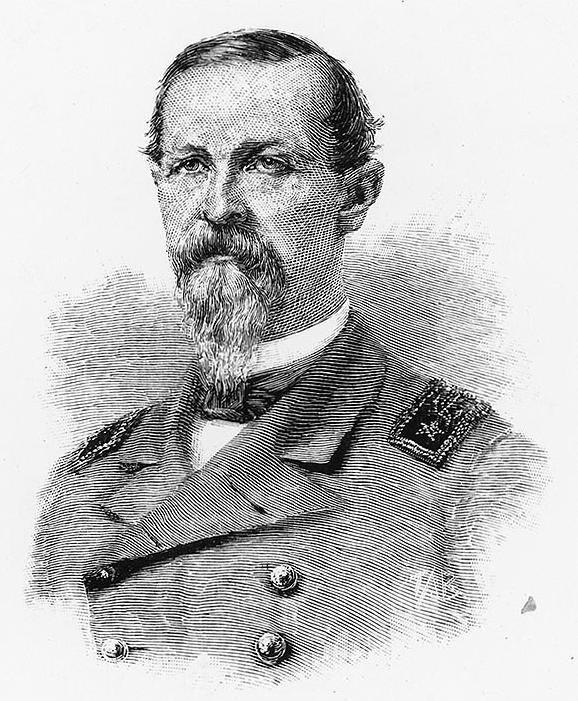
- James D. Johnston
- Born: 1817; Kentucky, U.S.
- Died: May 9, 1896 (aged 78–79) Savannah, Georgia, U.S.
- Allegiance: United States, Confederate States
- Branch: United States Navy, Confederate States Navy
- Service years: 1832–1861 (U.S. Navy); 1861–1865 (C.S. Navy)
- Commands: CSS Baltic, CSS Tennessee
- Conflicts: Battle of Mobile Bay

James Douglas Johnston (1817 – May 9, 1896) was an officer in the United States Navy, then served as a commander in the Confederate States Navy during the American Civil War.

== Biography ==
Johnston was born in Kentucky and was appointed from that state as a United States Navy Midshipman in 1832. He achieved the rank of Lieutenant in 1843 and had not received further promotion when he resigned from the service in April 1861. Johnston joined the Confederate States Navy in the same month as a First Lieutenant and was promoted to Commander in June 1864. His initial Confederate service was as a lighthouse inspector. He was assigned to the New Orleans Station in 1861 and to the forces on Mobile Bay, Alabama, later in that year.

Johnston commanded the ironclads CSS Baltic in 1861-63 and CSS Tennessee in 1864. He was captured with the latter ship during the Battle of Mobile Bay on August 5, 1864, and held as a prisoner of war until the following October. After he was exchanged, Commander Johnston returned to duty in the Mobile, Alabama area, remaining there until the end of the American Civil War in May 1865, when he surrendered and was paroled.

On 9 May 1896, he died in Savannah, Georgia.
