= CSS George Page =

Steamboat

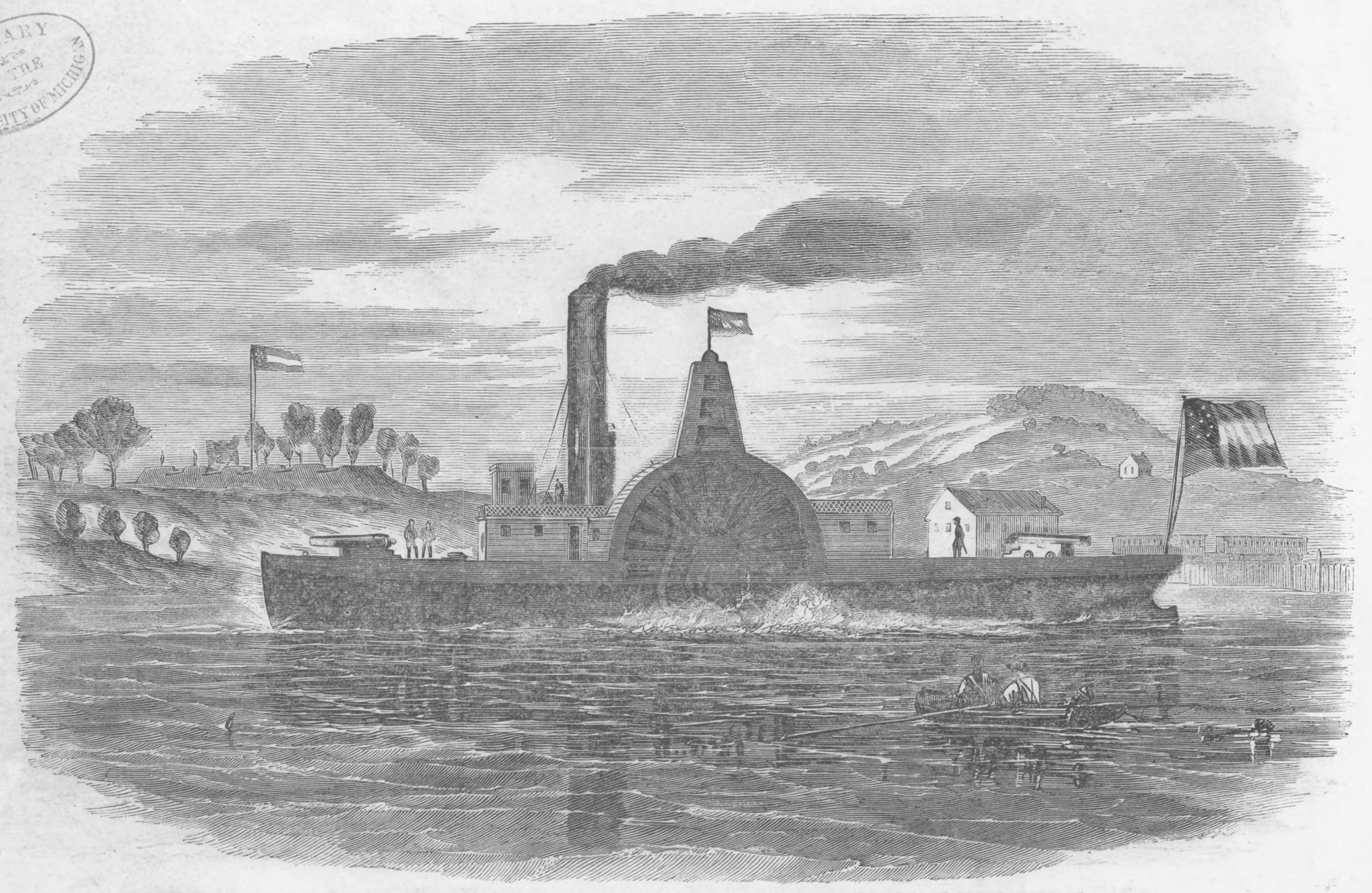
- CSS George Page

History

Confederate States
- Name: George Page
- Launched: 1853
- Commissioned: May 1861
- Fate: Burned March 9, 1862

General characteristics
- Displacement: 410 tons
- Propulsion: Steam engine
- Armament: 2 guns

CSS George Page, a 410-ton sidewheel steamship, was originally built as a transport at Washington, D.C. in 1853.

She was attached to the Quartermaster's Department of the United States Army, until captured by the Confederates at nearby Aquia Creek, Virginia in May 1861, when she became a part of the Virginia Navy. In June 1861 Virginia transferred her vessels to the Confederate States Navy and George Page, commanded by Lieutenant Charles Carroll Simms, CSN, was fitted out for river defense service, and sometime later renamed City of Richmond. Her upper works may have been removed at this time.

She operated in the Potomac River in the vicinity of Quantico Creek. On July 7, 1861, she was damaged by gunfire from USS Pocahontas. George Page was destroyed by her crew upon abandonment of the Evansport batteries on March 9, 1862.
