= USS De Haven =

Two ships of the United States Navy have borne the name USS De Haven, in honor of Edwin J. De Haven, an American naval officer and explorer.

- USS De Haven (DD-469), was a Fletcher-class destroyer, launched in 1942 and sunk in 1943.
- USS De Haven (DD-727), was a Allen M. Sumner-class destroyer, launched in 1944 and struck in 1973, when she was transferred to South Korea and renamed Incheon. She was stricken and scrapped in 1993.

== See also ==
- USS Haven (AH-12), a World War II hospital ship
