= USS Nashville =

USS Nashville may refer to:

- USS Nashville (PG-7), was a gunboat in service from 1897 to 1918
- USS Nashville (CL-43), was a light cruiser in service from 1938 to 1946; sold to Chile in 1951 and scrapped in 1985
- USS Nashville (LPD-13), was an amphibious transport dock that served from 1970 to 2009

See also

- CSS Nashville
