= Nashville-class ironclad =

Class overview
- Name: Nashville-class ironclad
- Operators: Confederate States Navy
- Built: 1863–64
- In service: 1864–65
- Planned: 3
- Completed: 1
- Scrapped: 1

General characteristics
- Type: Casemate ironclad
- Tonnage: 1100 tons
- Length: 271 ft (83 m)
- Beam: 62 ft 6 in (19.05 m)
- Draft: 10 ft 9 in (3.28 m)
- Installed power: 2 Sidewheel paddles
- Propulsion: 2 Steam engines
- Speed: Unknown
- Complement: Unknown
- Armament: 3 × 7 in (180 mm) Brooke rifles; 1 × 24-pounder howitzer
- Armor: 2–6 inches (51–152 mm)

The Nashville-class ironclad was a class of three side-wheel casemate ironclads built for the Confederate States Navy during the American Civil War. Only the lead ship of the class, Nashville, was commissioned into Confederate States Navy service; two sister ships were broken up on the stocks before they were completed.

== Ships ==
Construction data
Ship	Builder	Launched	Completed	Fate
CSS Nashville	Montgomery, Alabama	Mid-1863	1864	Surrendered, 10 May 1865, sold for scrap, 22 November 1867
Unnamed	Montgomery, Alabama	March 1863	Constructive total loss when launched	Broken up, April 1864
Unnamed	Oven Bluff, Alabama	Never finished		
