= CSS Nashville (1864) =

Confederate ironclad

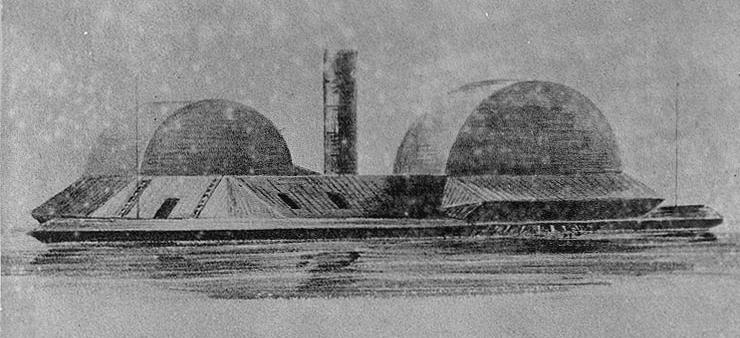
- CSS Nashville

History

Confederate States
- Laid down: September 1862
- Launched: mid-1863
- Commissioned: 15 September 1864
- Decommissioned: 10 May 1865
- Fate: Surrendered to U.S. forces; sold 22 November 1867

General characteristics
- Class & type: Nashville-class ironclad
- Displacement: approximately 1100 tons
- Length: 271 ft (82.6 m)
- Beam: 62 ft 6 in (19.1 m)
- Draft: 10 ft 9 in (3.3 m)
- Propulsion: 2 steam engines
- Speed: unknown
- Complement: unknown
- Armament: 3 × 7 in (178 mm) Brooke rifles; 1 × 24-pounder howitzer

CSS Nashville was a large side-wheel Nashville-class steam casemate ironclad built by the Confederates late in the American Civil War.

== Description ==
The ship was 271 feet (82.6 m) long overall, had a beam of 62 feet 6 inches (19.1 m) and a draft of 10 feet 9 inches (3.3 m). The side wheels were powered by two steam engines with a 9-inch (229 mm) bore and a 36-inch (914 mm) stroke. She was armed with three 7-inch (178 mm) Brooke rifles and a 24-pounder howitzer.

== Construction and career ==
Nashville was laid down at Montgomery, Alabama, because of the availability of riverboat engines there. Launched in mid-1863, Nashville was taken to Mobile, Alabama, for completion in 1864. Part of her armor came from the CSS Baltic. Her first commander was Lieutenant Charles Carroll Simms, CSN.

Still fitting out, she took no part in the Battle of Mobile Bay on 5 August 1864. She helped fend off attacks on Spanish Fort, Alabama, on 27 March 1865, supported Confederate commander Randall L. Gibson until driven away by Federal batteries, and shelled Federal troops near Fort Blakeley on 2 April 1865. The ships retreated up the Tombigbee River 10 days later when Mobile surrendered. She was one of the vessels formally surrendered by Commodore Ebenezer Farrand, CSN, at Nanna Hubba Bluff on 10 May 1865.

Although never quite finished, she had been heavily armored with triple 2-inch plating forward and around her pilot house, only a single thickness aft and there had been some doubts expressed that her builders might have overestimated her structural strength. Rear Admiral Henry K. Thatcher, USN, wrote on June 30, 1865, after survey, "She was hogged when surrendered and is not strong enough to bear the weight of her full armor." He was certain "she could not live in a seaway."

Following her surrender, Nashville was laid up until 22 November 1867, when she was sold for scrap at New Orleans, Louisiana, her armor having previously been stripped for reuse in other vessels.

== Commanders ==
- Lieutenant Charles Carroll Simms (1864)
- Lieutenant John W. Bennett (late 1864 - May 1865)
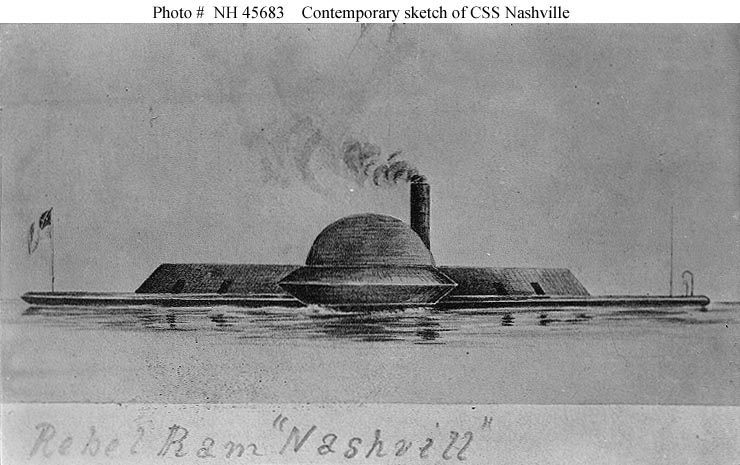
Sketch Ram CSS Nashville
