= USS De Haven (DD-469) =

Fletcher-class destroyer

Coordinates: 9°9′S 159°52′E

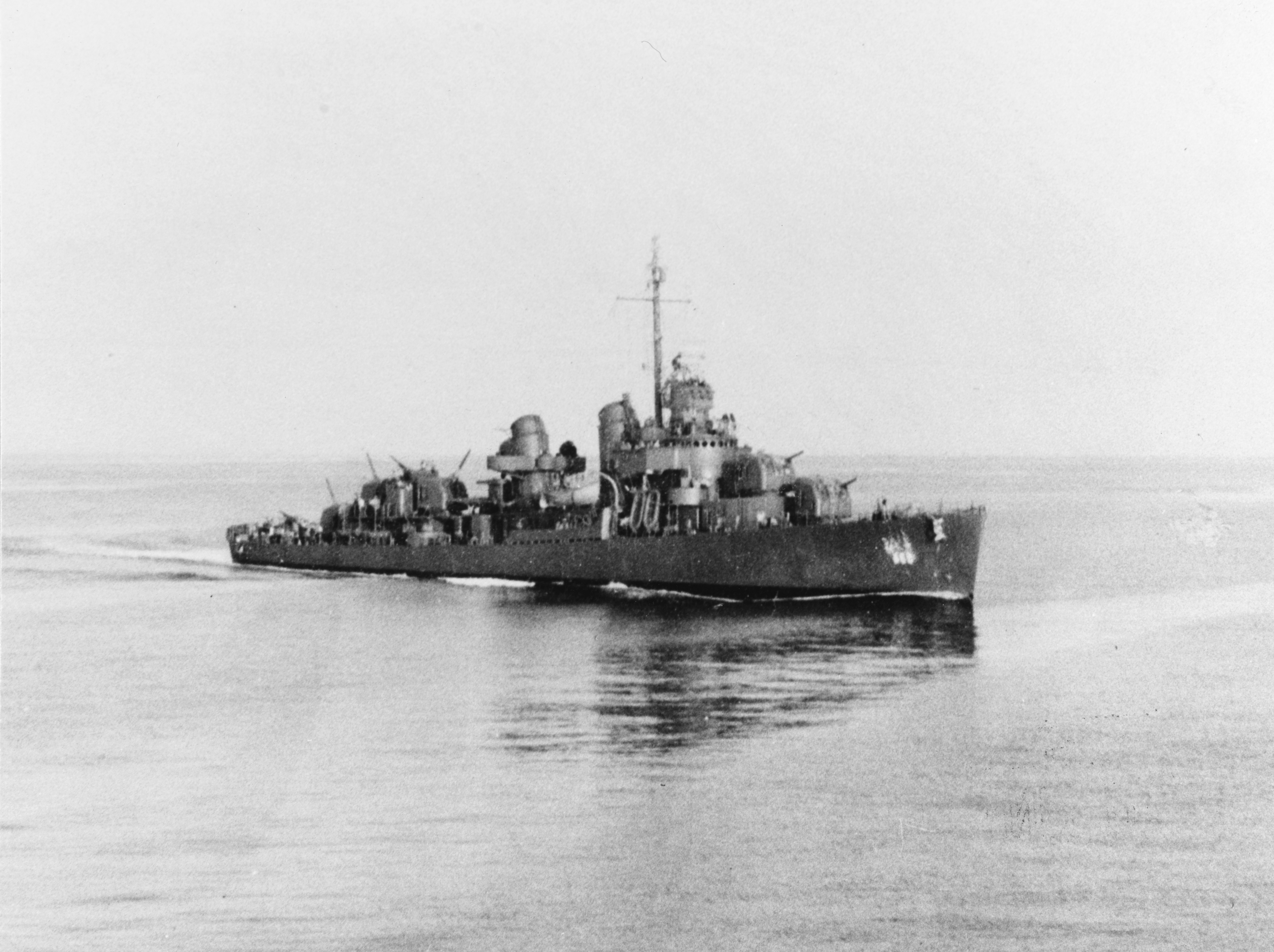

History

United States
- Name: De Haven
- Namesake: Edwin J. De Haven
- Builder: Bath Iron Works
- Laid down: 27 September 1941
- Launched: 28 June 1942
- Commissioned: 21 September 1942
- Fate: Sunk by Japanese aircraft off Savo Island on 1 February 1943

General characteristics
- Class & type: Fletcher-class destroyer
- Displacement: 2,050 long tons (2,083 t)
- Length: 376 ft 6 in (114.76 m)
- Beam: 39 ft 8 in (12.09 m)
- Draft: 17 ft 9 in (5.41 m)
- Propulsion: 60,000 shp (45,000 kW); geared turbines; 2 propellers
- Speed: 38 knots (70 km/h; 44 mph)
- Range: 6,500 nmi (12,000 km; 7,500 mi) at 15 kn (28 km/h; 17 mph)
- Complement: 329 officers and enlisted
- Armament: 5 × single Mk 12 5 in (127 mm)/38 guns; 5 × twin 40 mm (1.6 in) Bofors AA guns; 7 × single 20 mm (0.8 in) Oerlikon AA guns; 2 × quintuple 21 in (533 mm) torpedo tubes; 6 × single depth charge throwers; 2 × depth charge racks

USS De Haven (DD-469) was a Fletcher-class destroyer of the United States Navy, the first Navy ship named for Lieutenant Edwin J. De Haven USN (1819–1865). De Haven was the first Fletcher-class ship lost in World War II, having been in commission only 133 days.

De Haven was laid down by the Bath Iron Works Corporation at Bath, Maine on 27 September 1941 and launched on 28 June 1942 by Miss H. N. De Haven, granddaughter of Lieutenant De Haven. The ship was commissioned on 21 September 1942, Commander Charles E. Tolman in command.

== Service history ==
De Haven sailed from Norfolk, Va. and reached Tongatapu, Tonga Islands, 28 November 1942 to escort a convoy of troopships to Guadalcanal to relieve the Marines who had been there since the invasion landings in August. De Haven screened the transports off Guadalcanal from 7 to 14 December, then sailed out of Espiritu Santo and Nouméa in the continuing Solomon Islands operations. She patrolled in the waters of the Southern Solomons to stop the "Tokyo Express", the nightly effort to supply the beleaguered Japanese troops still fighting on the invaded islands, and took part in two bombardments of Kolombangara island during January 1943.

On 1 February 1943, De Haven screened six LCTs and a seaplane tender establishing a beachhead at Maravovo on Guadalcanal. While escorting two of the landing craft back to their base in the afternoon, De Haven was warned of an impending air attack by Japanese aircraft supporting Operation Ke. She sighted nine unidentified planes and opened fire as six swung sharply toward her. She shot down three of these planes, but not before all six had dropped their bombs. De Haven was hit by three bombs and further damaged by a near miss. One bomb hit the superstructure squarely, killing the commanding officer instantly. All was lost after the first hit and the ship began to settle rapidly, sinking in Ironbottom Sound about 2 nautical miles (3.7 km; 2.3 mi) east of Savo Island. One of the LCTs she had escorted rescued the survivors. De Haven lost 167 killed and 38 wounded.

Her wreck was discovered by Robert Ballard in 1992.

== 2025 Ocean Exploration Trusts Expedition ==
Located in the Solomon Islands, Iron Bottom Sound was the site of five major naval battles during the early years of the Pacific campaign during World War II. Over 100 naval vessels were lost during battles here, but only 30 have been located, and at least 21 remain to be found in the deep waters of Iron Bottom Sound.

On July 8, 2025, E/V Nautilus identified the wreck of the De Haven.

== Honors ==
De Haven received one battle star for her World War II service.
