= CSS Nashville =

Two ships in the Confederate Navy were named CSS Nashville in honor of Nashville, Tennessee.

- CSS Nashville (1861) was a steamer, seized in 1861. She was a blockade runner, renamed Thomas L. Wragg and later commissioned as the privateer Rattlesnake and destroyed in 1863
- CSS Nashville (1864) was a large side-wheel steam ironclad built in 1863

== See also ==
- USS Nashville
