= Engines of Rebellion =

2018 book by Saxon Bisbee

Engines of Rebellion: Confederate Ironclads and Steam Engineering in the American Civil War
- Author: Saxon Bisbee
- Language: English
- Subject: Ironclad warships of the Confederate States Navy
- Genre: Non-fiction
- Publisher: University of Alabama Press
- Publication date: 2018
- Publication place: United States
- Pages: 264
- ISBN: 9780817319861

Engines of Rebellion: Confederate Ironclads and Steam Engineering in the American Civil War is a 2018 book written by naval historian Saxon Bisbee about the use of ironclad warships by the Confederate States of America. The book discusses 27 vessels, focusing on those with American-produced machinery. The work emphasizes the engineering of the ironclads. Multiple reviewers praised Bisbee's insights and thoroughness on the subject, although several noted that the accompanying illustrations were too small.

== Content ==
Engines of Rebellion: Confederate Ironclads and Steam Engineering in the American Civil War was written by Saxon Bisbee and published in 2018 by the University of Alabama Press. It is based upon a 2012 master's thesis written by Bisbee for East Carolina University titled "'How a Vessel of This Magnitude Was Moved': A Comparative Analysis of Confederate Ironclad Steam Engines, Boilers, and Propulsion Systems". The book discusses marine steam engines and the use of ironclad warships by the Confederate States Navy. As opposed to records about the Union Navy, which are centralized, Confederate records often are scattered through the American South, are frequently not digitized, and sometimes no longer exist. Also utilized by Bisbee were archaeological reports and letters and journals from those involved with the construction and operation of the vessels.

The beginning portion of the book describes the engines used in ships of the time, before discussing the ironclads themselves, beginning with existing vessels converted into ironclads, and then discussing purpose-built ironclads, as well as some vessels never completed. The chapters themselves are topically arranged to cover similar vessels. Only ships with American-produced machinery are discussed, excluding CSS Atlanta and CSS Texas, and those ordered from the United Kingdom or France are excluded. These parameters limit the discussion to 27 ironclads, with mention of a few incomplete ones. Bisbee includes an appendix detailing the design specifications and fate of the Confederate ironclads, as well as an extensive bibliography. Engines of Rebellion includes approximately 45 illustrations, although reviewer Donald L. Canney writes that they should generally have been enlarged during the publishing process, and reviewer Gerald Weinstein also noted that the images were so small that they were of little use.

== Reception ==
Canney describes Engines of Rebellion as a thorough treatment of the subject, stating that the obscure subject and the state of the source material would have made the undertaking difficult; he also refers to Bisbee's list of source materials as "impressive". He does suggest that including discussion of Texas and Atlanta would have rounded out full coverage of the Confederate ironclads, and partially disagrees with Bisbee's conclusion that the Confederate Navy "paved the way" for modern navies. Canney notes that while the Confederates were paving the way in use of naval mines and submarines, that they struggled throughout the war with marine engines and that it was other developments that primarily brought about modern navies.

Weinstein wrote that Bisbee generally provided sufficient evidence for his conclusions, even when he had to resort to conjecture, although Weinstein also casts doubt on a claim in the glossary that Confederate shipbuilders used asbestos-coated boiler plates and states that one footnote contains an error about the history of the 1854 USS Constellation. He also praised Bisbee's work in piecing together disparate sources about the ironclads's engines. Reviewer Thomas A. Kinney considered the glossary and illustrations useful. Kinney also praises the book's scholarship and level of detail, although he says that "[Bisbee] at times seems to claim success for a particular Confederate ironclad whose performance was at best marginal". He also writes that Bisbee's work provides correct identifications for previously-misidentified equipment features.

Reviewer Dirk C. Blackdeer praised Engines of Rebellion's illustrations, although he expressed regret that none of Bisbee's own illustrative work was included. Blackdeer also referred to the work as "concise but thorough" and recommended it to enthusiasts of American Civil War and naval history. Reviewer Andrew W. Hall noted that Bisbee provided "new and critical insights", even when discussing commonly-retold events. Hall gives as an example Bisbee's discussion of engine failure of CSS Arkansas, an aspect of that vessel which has garnered less scholarly attention. He summarized Engines of Rebellion as "an important and valuable contribution to the literature" and considered it to fill a gap in studies of Confederate ironclads by focusing on the engineering of the vessels.

== Sources ==
- Canney, Donald L. (September 2019). "Engines of Rebellion: Confederate Ironclads and Steam Engineering in the American Civil War (review)". The Journal of American History. 106 (2): 470–471. doi:10.1093/jahist/jaz412.
- Hall, Andrew W. (2020). "Saxon T. Bisbee: Engines of Rebellion—Confederate Ironclads and Steam Engineering in the American Civil War". Journal of Marine Archaeology. 15: 247–249.
- Kinney, Thomas S. (August 2019). "Engines of Rebellion: Confederate Ironclads and Steam Engineering in the American Civil War (review)". Journal of Southern History. 85 (3): 701–702.
- Weinstein, Gerald (2018). "Engines of Rebellion: Confederate Ironclads and Steam Engineering in the American Civil War (review)". IA. 44 (1/2): 196–197.
