= Johan Carl Christian Petersen =

Danish seaman and interpreter (1813–1880)

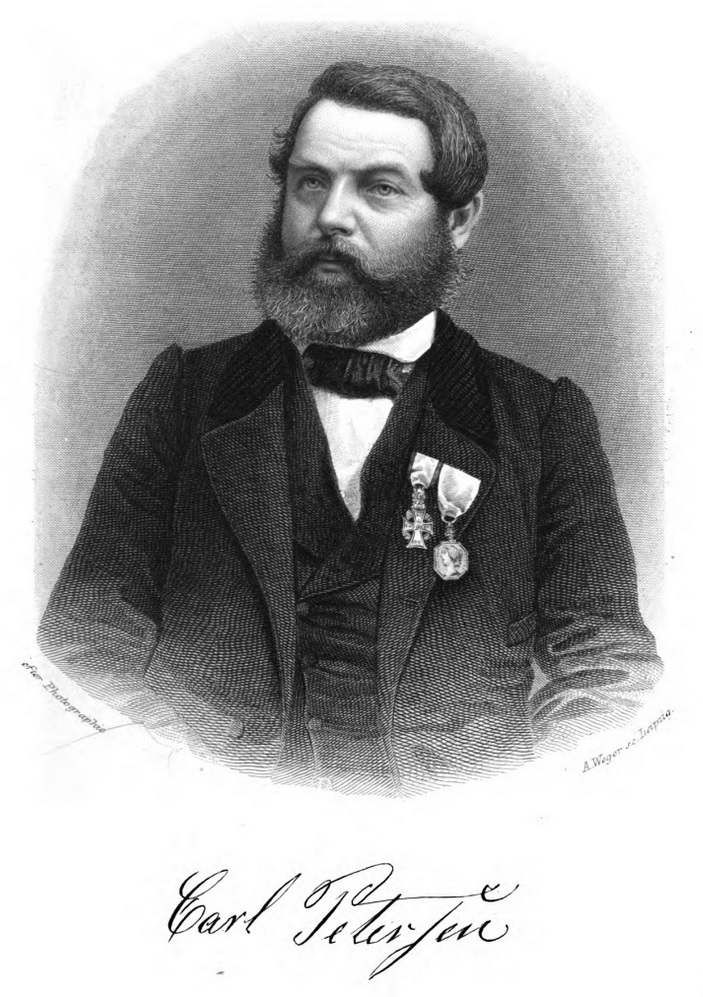
Portrait of Carl Petersen Weger

Johan Carl Christian Petersen (28 June 1813 – 24 June 1880) was a Danish seaman and interpreter who participated in several expeditions in Northern Canada and Greenland in search of the missing British explorer John Franklin.

== Early life ==
Petersen was born in Copenhagen. At the age of about 20 he moved to Godhavn (now Qeqertarsuaq) in Greenland where he made a living as a carpenter and sailor. In 1841 he moved to Upernavik, at the time the most northern Danish colony in Greenland. There he married a Greenlandic Inuk woman and adopted their customs and way of living, in the process he became a quite skilled hunter, dog sledge driver, and observer.

== Exploration ==
He worked on William Penny's Expedition (1850–51), Elisha Kane's Second Grinnell Expedition (1853–1855) into Kane Basin, Francis Leopold McClintock Expedition (1857) and Isaac Israel Hayes North Pole Expedition (1860–61). He wrote two books about these expeditions.

On Kane's expedition he worked together with the young Inuk Hans Hendrik, for whom Hans Island was named.

== Death ==
After these expeditions, Petersen moved back to Denmark and died in Copenhagen, at the age of 66. Johan Petersen Fjord in Greenland is named after him.

== Writing ==
- Erindringer fra Polarlandene optegnede af Carl Petersen, tolk ved Pennys og Kanes nordexpeditioner, 1850-55, Copenhagen, P.G. Philipsens Forlag, 1857.
- Den sidste Franklin-expedition med "Fox", Capt. M'Clintock, Copenhagen, F. Wøldikes Forlagsboghandel, 1860.
