= Wellington Channel =

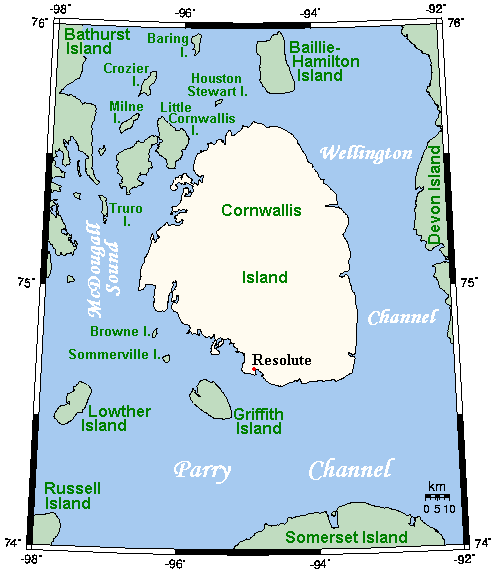
The Wellington Channel, east of Cornwallis Island

The Wellington Channel (75°00′N 093°00′W) (not to be confused with Wellington Strait) is a natural waterway through the central Canadian Arctic Archipelago in Qikiqtaaluk Region, Nunavut. It runs north–south, separating Cornwallis Island and Devon Island. Queens Channel lies to the west, separated by Baillie-Hamilton Island, Dundas Island, and Margaret Island.

== Explorations ==
In 1845, Sir John Franklin wintered at Beechey Island at the channel's southeast end. In winter 1848, Franklin's ships got trapped in sea ice further south in Victoria Strait, leading to the tragic end of what became known as Franklin's lost expedition. The First Grinnell expedition, an American effort to determine the fate of Franklin's lost expedition, covered the Wellington Channel. They identified there the remains of Franklin's Beechey Island winter camp, providing the first solid clues to Franklin's activities before becoming icebound themselves.

In spring 1851, the channel was explored by William Penny, who went by sledge to the northwest tip of Devon Island. Edward Belcher explored the channel in 1852.

In 1853, the French naval officer and explorer Joseph René Bellot died aged twenty-seven after falling through the ice in the Wellington Channel.
