= Union Bay (Alaska) =

Bay within the U.S. state of Alaska

Coordinates: 55.760559999999998°N 132.21278000000001°W

Union Bay is located in the Alexander Archipelago within the U.S. state of Alaska. It is situated on the northeast side of Lemesurier Point, the south point at the entrance to Ernest Sound. It is 3.5 miles (5.6 km) wide at the entrance, 1.25 miles (2.01 km) at its head, and is about 3 miles (4.8 km) long. At its head is a large lagoon, mostly bare at low water, into which empties a large stream. The waters of the bay are deep, but there is anchorage with good protection from southward, on the east side of the head of the bay, in about 18 fathoms. There is a rock with a depth of 18 feet (5.5 m) in the middle of the bay's entrance and 2.5 miles (4.0 km) northward of Lemly Rock.
