= Edwin De Haven =

American naval officer and Arctic explorer (1816–1865)

Edwin Jesse De Haven
- Born: May 7, 1816; Philadelphia, Pennsylvania, U.S.
- Died: May 1, 1865 (aged 48); Philadelphia, Pennsylvania, U.S.
- Burial place: Christ Church Burial Ground, Philadelphia, Pennsylvania
- Military career
- Commands: USS Advance (First Grinnell Expedition, 1850)

Edwin Jesse DeHaven (May 7, 1816 – May 1, 1865) was a United States Navy officer and explorer of the first half of the 19th century who was best known for his command of the First Grinnell expedition in 1850, which was directed to ascertain what had happened to the lost Franklin Polar Expedition.

== Life ==
Born in Philadelphia on May 7, 1816, De Haven became a midshipman at the age of 10, serving until 1857. From 1839 to 1842, he participated in the Wilkes Expedition, officially known as the United States Exploring Expedition.

His most notable achievement was serving as commanding officer of the Advance. Together with Rescue, the ship participated in the First Grinnell expedition, an Arctic search mission to discover the remains of John Franklin's earlier, 1847, Arctic expedition. The two ships left New York on May 5, 1850. De Haven and his crew were at sea for 16 months, spending the winter inside the Arctic Circle.

After returning from the expedition, De Haven served in the United States Coast Survey before spending the rest of his career at the United States Naval Observatory under superintendent Matthew Fontaine Maury.

Suffering from impaired vision, he was placed on the retired list in 1862. He died in Philadelphia May 1, 1865, and was interred at that city's Christ Church Burial Ground.

== Namesakes ==
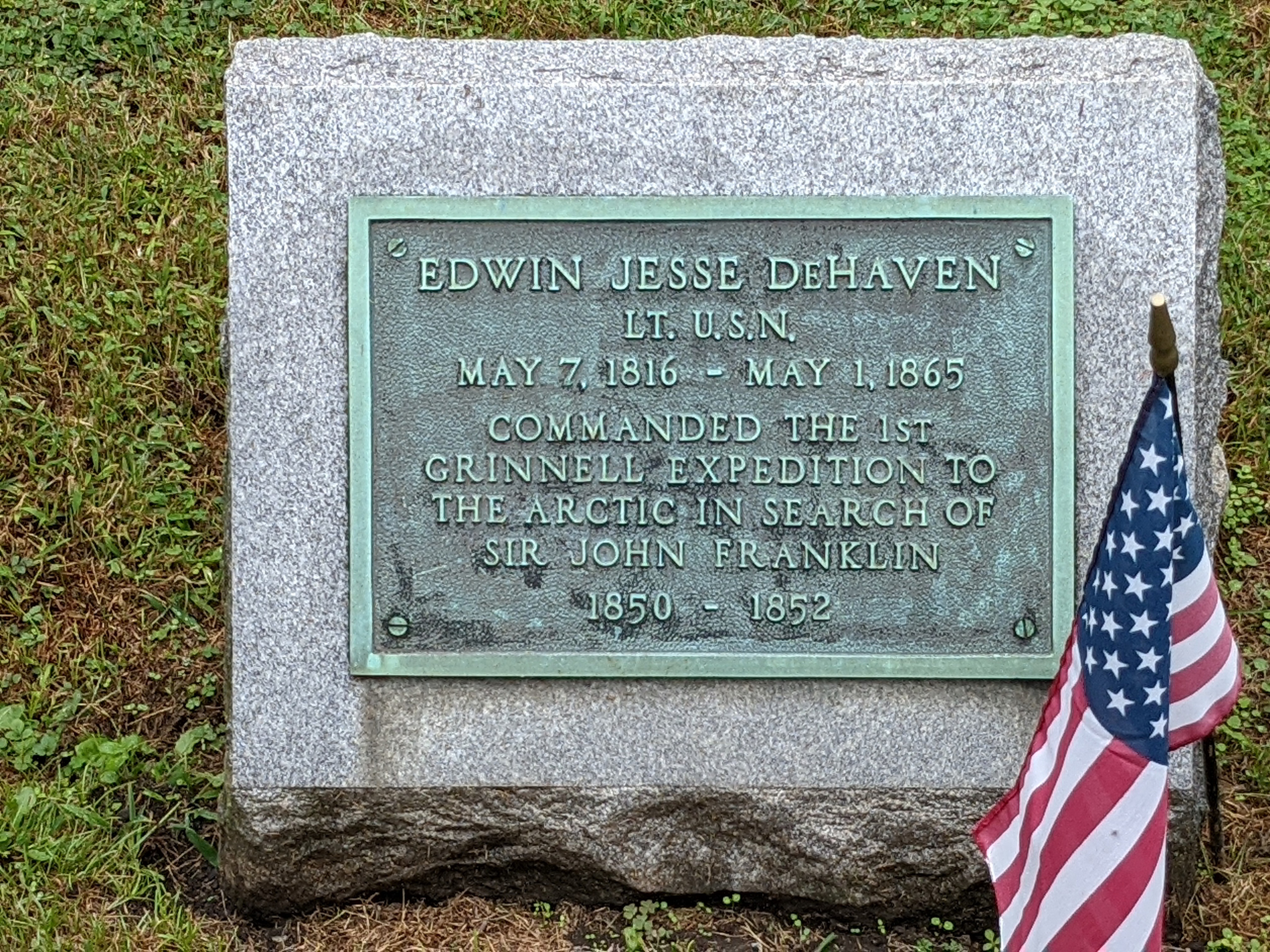
DeHaven's headstone at Christ Church Burial Ground in Philadelphia

The United States Navy named two destroyers USS De Haven in his honor.
