= USS Release =

Cargo ship of the United States Navy

History

United States
- Name: USS Release
- Acquired: by purchase, 3 April 1855
- Commissioned: 3 April 1855
- Decommissioned: 6 October 1865
- Fate: Sold, 25 October 1865

General characteristics
- Type: Barque
- Tonnage: 327
- Length: 113 ft (34 m)
- Beam: 27 ft 2 in (8.28 m)
- Draft: 11 ft 9 in (3.58 m)
- Propulsion: Sail
- Armament: 2 × 32-pounder guns

USS Release was a bark-rigged sailing vessel in the United States Navy during the American Civil War.

Release, formerly Eringol, was purchased 3 April 1855 at Boston, Massachusetts, and commissioned on that date for use as a storeship. In June 1855, she sailed as part of an Arctic expedition to search for Dr. Elisha Kane and his missing party of explorers. Release sailed November 1856 to Demerara, British Guiana, to pick up sugar cane cuttings for the Department of the Interior. In 1857, she carried supplies to Aspinwall (now Colón), Panama for the Pacific Squadron; in 1859 she carried stores to the Mediterranean Squadron. Later in 1859 she served as supply ship for the Paraguay expedition sent to Asunción to demand indemnity and apology from the Paraguayan Government for the firing on Water Witch in 1858.

On 5 April 1861, Release sailed to Fort Pickens, Pensacola, Florida, to act as supply ship for the Gulf Blockading Squadron. After returning to New York for more stores, she sailed for Hampton Roads, for similar duty with Atlantic Blockading Squadron. She was sent to Gibraltar on 30 September 1862 to meet USS Kearsarge and then directed to Algeciras, Morocco to watch the Confederate raider Sumter. During this period, Release unknowingly passed within 20 miles of another raider, Alabama.

From August 1863 to the end of hostilities, Release served as an ordnance storeship, based at Beaufort, North Carolina, for ships blockading the southern coast from Wilmington, North Carolina, to Norfolk, Virginia, either at sea delivering stores to the blockaders at their stations or at Beaufort tied up as a stores hulk.

Release was placed out of commission 6 October 1865 at Port Royal, South Carolina, and sold at public auction at New York 25 October 1865.

As of 2005, no other ships have borne this name.

== See also ==
- Confederate States Navy
- Union Navy
