= Elisha Kent Kane =

American explorer and military medical officer (1820–1857)

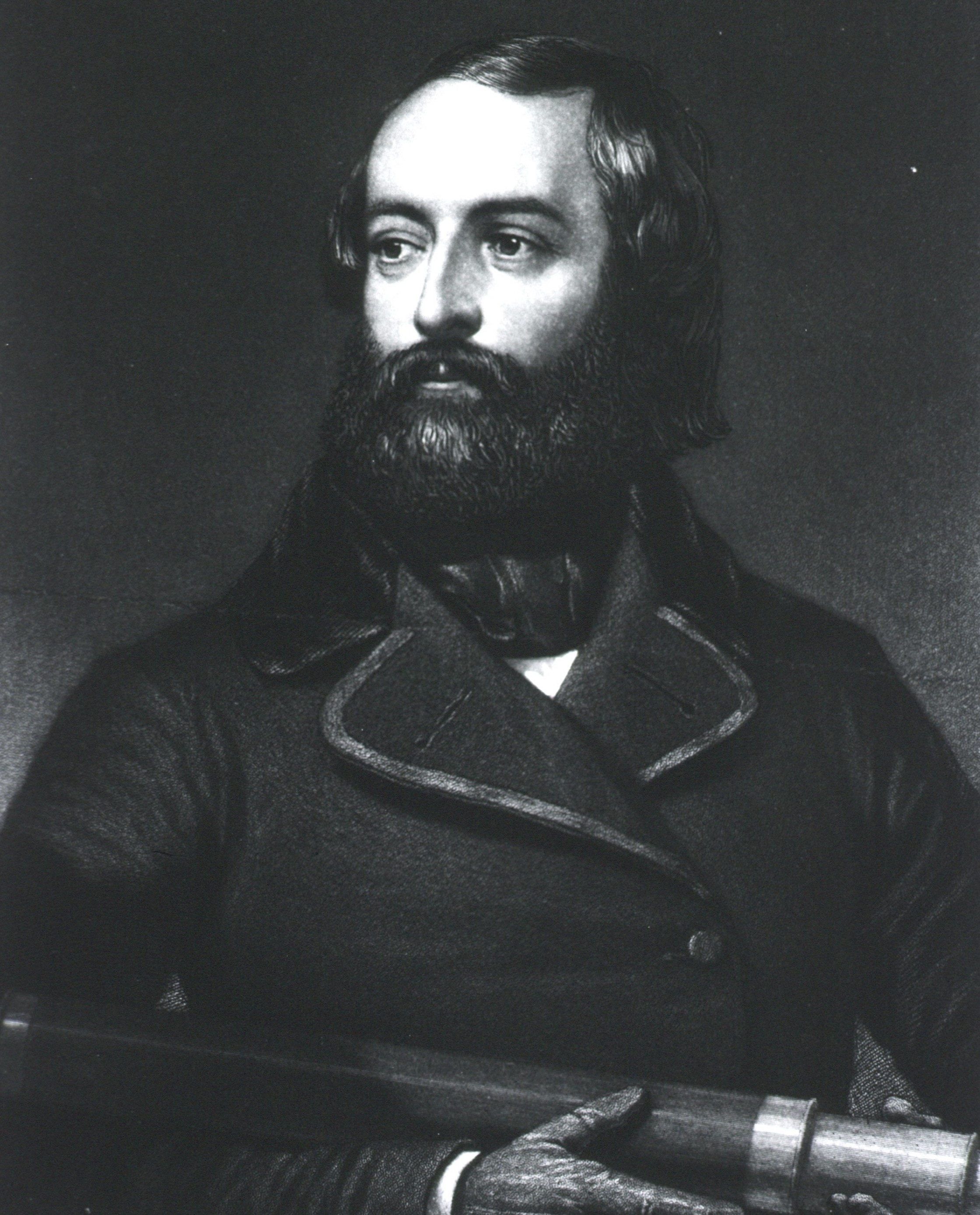
- Born: February 3, 1820; Philadelphia, Pennsylvania
- Died: February 16, 1857 (aged 37); Havana, Cuba
- Burial place: Laurel Hill Cemetery
- Relatives: Thomas Leiper (grandfather); John K. Kane (father); Thomas L. Kane (brother)
- Military career
- Allegiance: United States of America
- Branch: United States Navy
- Service years: 1843–1857
- Rank: Assistant surgeon
- Expeditions: First Grinnell expedition; Second Grinnell expedition

Elisha Kent Kane (February 3, 1820 – February 16, 1857) was a United States Navy medical officer and Arctic explorer. He served as assistant surgeon during Caleb Cushing's journey to China to negotiate the Treaty of Wangxia and in the Africa Squadron. He was assigned as a special envoy to the United States Army during the Mexican–American War and as a surveyor in the United States Coast Survey.

He was senior medical officer in the First Grinnell expedition to rescue or discover the fate of the explorer Sir John Franklin. He led the Second Grinnell expedition to the Arctic which was unsuccessful in discovering the fate of Franklin's expedition. His explorations of the Arctic went further North than any other expeditions at the time and led to the eventual path to the North Pole taken by subsequent explorers.

He spoke frequently to large audiences about his Arctic expeditions. He published two books chronicling his explorations; The United States Grinnell Expedition in Search of Sir John Franklin: A Personal Narrative in 1856 and Arctic explorations: The Second Grinnell Expedition in Search of Sir John Franklin, 1853,'54, '55 in 1857. Two United States Navy ships, a lunar crater and a waterway in the Arctic were named in his honor.

== Early life and education ==
Kane was born in Philadelphia, on February 3, 1820, the first son of John Kintzing Kane, a U.S. district judge, and Jane Duval Leiper. His maternal grandfather was Thomas Leiper, American Revolutionary War patriot and a founder of the Philadelphia City Troop. His brother was attorney, diplomat, abolitionist, and Civil War general, Thomas L. Kane.

In 1837, Kane entered the University of Virginia to study civil engineering. He worked closely with geology Professor William Barton Rogers and participated in several outings into the Blue Ridge Mountains to map geological formations. However, health concerns due to rheumatic fever forced him to withdraw from school and return home. His illness progressed to endocarditis and the family feared he would die. After recovering, concerned that the physical demands of civil engineering would be too much for his health, he turned to the study of medicine. On October 19, 1840, he became a resident physician at Blockley Almshouse while also studying at the University of Pennsylvania. In the Spring of 1841, he became Senior Resident Physician at Blockley. He was the author of a publication in The American Journal of the Medical Sciences on original research on urinary markers of pregnancy. Kane graduated from the University of Pennsylvania Medical School in 1842.

== Career ==
On September 14, 1843, he became an assistant surgeon in the Navy. The post allowed him to travel the world including to Bombay, Ceylon, Macao, Madeira and Rio de Janeiro. He served in the China Commercial Treaty mission on the USS Brandywine under Caleb Cushing. While Cushing negotiated the Treaty of Wangxia with the Chinese, Kane and the crew of the USS Brandywine explored the island of Luzon in the Philippines. He descended into the Taal Volcano to obtain water samples, was almost overcome by the toxic fumes and angered the locals who considered the volcano sacred. He served in the Africa Squadron and in February 1847 contracted "coast fever" (most likely a strain of malaria) and returned to the United States to recover.

In the Fall of 1847, he petitioned Secretary of State, James Buchanan, to be assigned as a special envoy to deliver a message to General Winfield Scott in Mexico City. Scott had taken Mexico City during the Mexican–American War but had stopped communicating with the White House. Buchanan and President James Polk feared that Scott was exceeding his authority and negotiating with the Mexicans. Kane was deployed to deliver a message to Scott reiterating the previous order to discontinue negotiations. Kane was deployed and received official orders from the Navy with a cover story that he was being sent to Mexico City to report on military hospitals and medical conditions. While approaching Mexico City, Kane's entourage was attacked at Nopalucan on January 6, 1848. During the battle, Mexican General Antonio Gaona and his son were both wounded. Kane treated a severed artery in the son's chest and saved his life. Kane also refused to allow the Mexican prisoners to be killed in retaliation for the attack and delivered them to U.S. forces in Mexico City. Kane returned to the U.S. in February 1849 and was honored by the city of Philadelphia with the presentation of a ceremonial sword.

Kane was assigned to the United States Coast Survey under Alexander Dallas Bache and had responsibility for the hydrographic survey of the southeast coast of the United States.

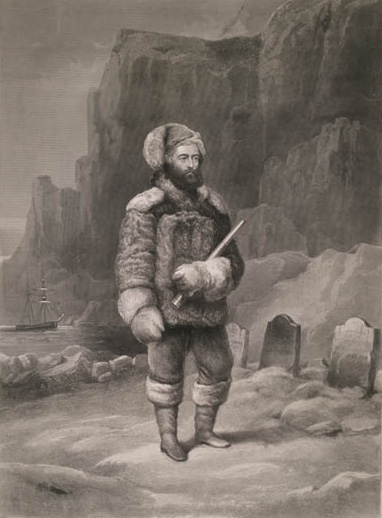
Elisha Kent Kane on Beechey Island

Kane was appointed senior medical officer of the Grinnell Arctic expedition of 1850–1851 under the command of Edwin de Haven, which searched unsuccessfully for Sir John Franklin's lost expedition. Kane was present along with Edwin de Haven and William Penny at the discovery of an encampment and three graves from the Franklin expedition on Beechey Island.

From 1851 to 1853, Kane spoke multiple times to audiences hundreds in size on his Arctic explorations and was well regarded due to his oratorical skills. His eloquence and frequency in speaking may be why he was credited with the discovery of the three graves. He began to write the book The U.S. Grinnell expedition in search of Sir John Franklin. He convinced Grinnell and several scientific organizations to fund a second expedition to continue to explore the Arctic and search for Franklin.

Kane organized and headed the Second Grinnell expedition on the USS Advance which sailed from New York on May 31, 1853. The expedition stopped in Fiskenaesset, Greenland to pick up the Inuk hunter, Hans Hendrik and at Upernavik, Greenland to pick up the sled driver and interpreter Johan Carl Christian Petersen and wintered in Rensselaer Bay. Though suffering from scurvy, and at times near death, he pushed on and charted the coasts of Smith Sound and the Kane Basin, penetrating farther north than any other explorer had done up to that time. At Cape Constitution he discovered the ice-free Kennedy Channel between Ellesmere Island and Greenland, later followed by Isaac Israel Hayes, Charles Francis Hall, Adolphus Greely, and Robert E. Peary in turn as they drove toward the North Pole.

Kane finally abandoned the icebound brig Advance on May 20, 1855, and made an 83-day march to Upernavik on the west coast of Greenland. The party, carrying the invalids, lost only one man. Kane and his men were saved by a sailing ship. Kane returned to New York on October 11, 1855, and the following year published his two-volume Arctic Explorations. Despite the unsuccessful expedition, he was welcomed home as a hero. He received hundreds of speaking invitations and stage producer James Wallack planned to turn the expedition into a play. Although in poor health, Kane completed his second book Arctic explorations, the second Grinnell expedition in search of Sir John Franklin. Kane used his celebrity and charisma to promote the idea of an open and temperate polar sea, which he claimed to have seen, and helped to link exploration of the High Arctic with nationalism and nation-building, adding a northern frontier for the United States to conquer in the pursuit of scientific progress.

== Personal life ==
In 1852, Kane met the Fox sisters, famous for their spirit rapping séances, and he became enamored with the middle sister, Margaretta. Kane was convinced that the sisters were frauds, and sought to reform Margaretta and paid for her education. She would later claim that they were secretly married in 1856 – she changed her name to Margaretta Fox Kane – and engaged the family in lawsuits over his will. After Kane's death, Margaretta converted to the Roman Catholic faith, but would eventually return to spiritualism.

== Death and legacy ==
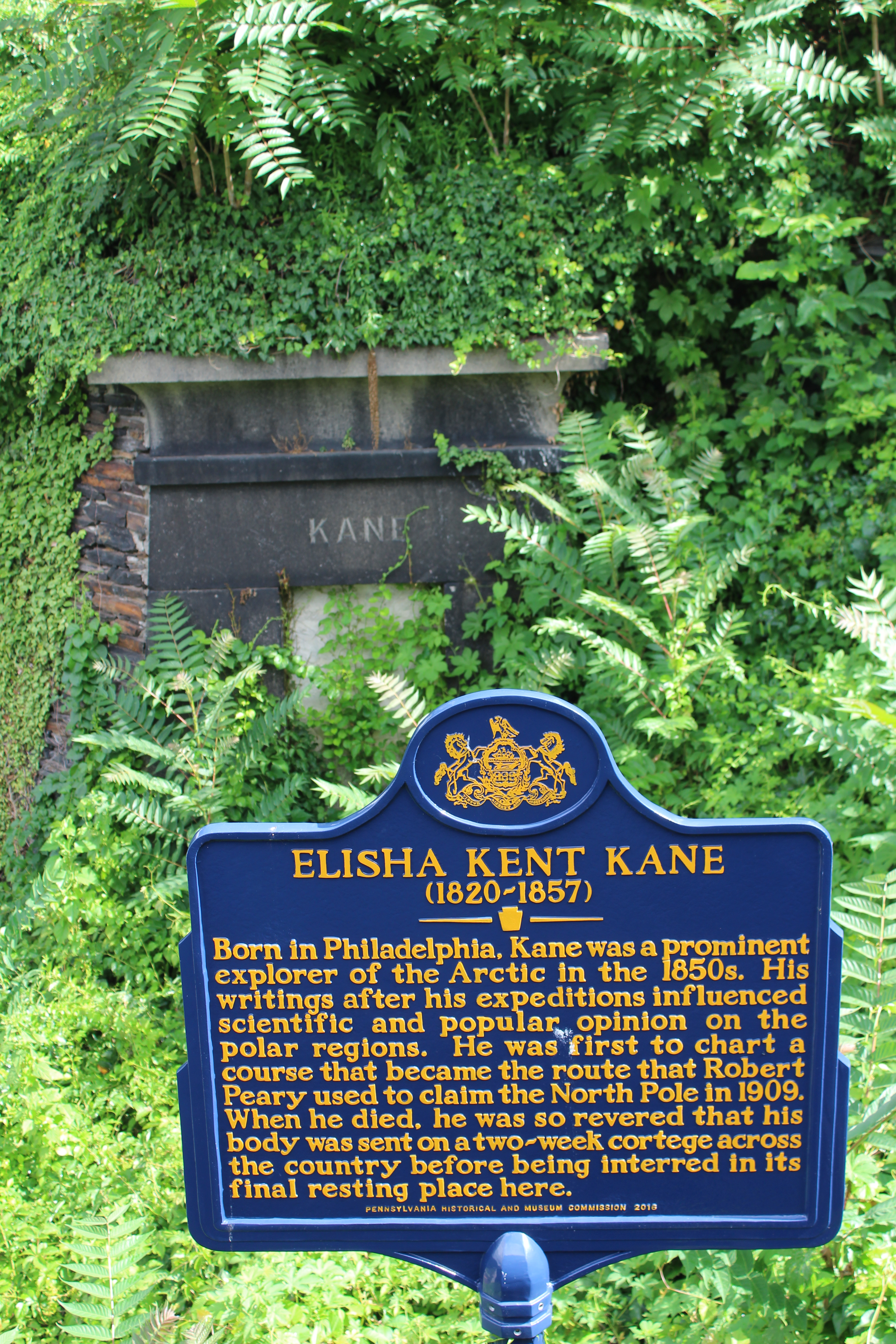
Kane's hillside historical plaque in Laurel Hill Cemetery

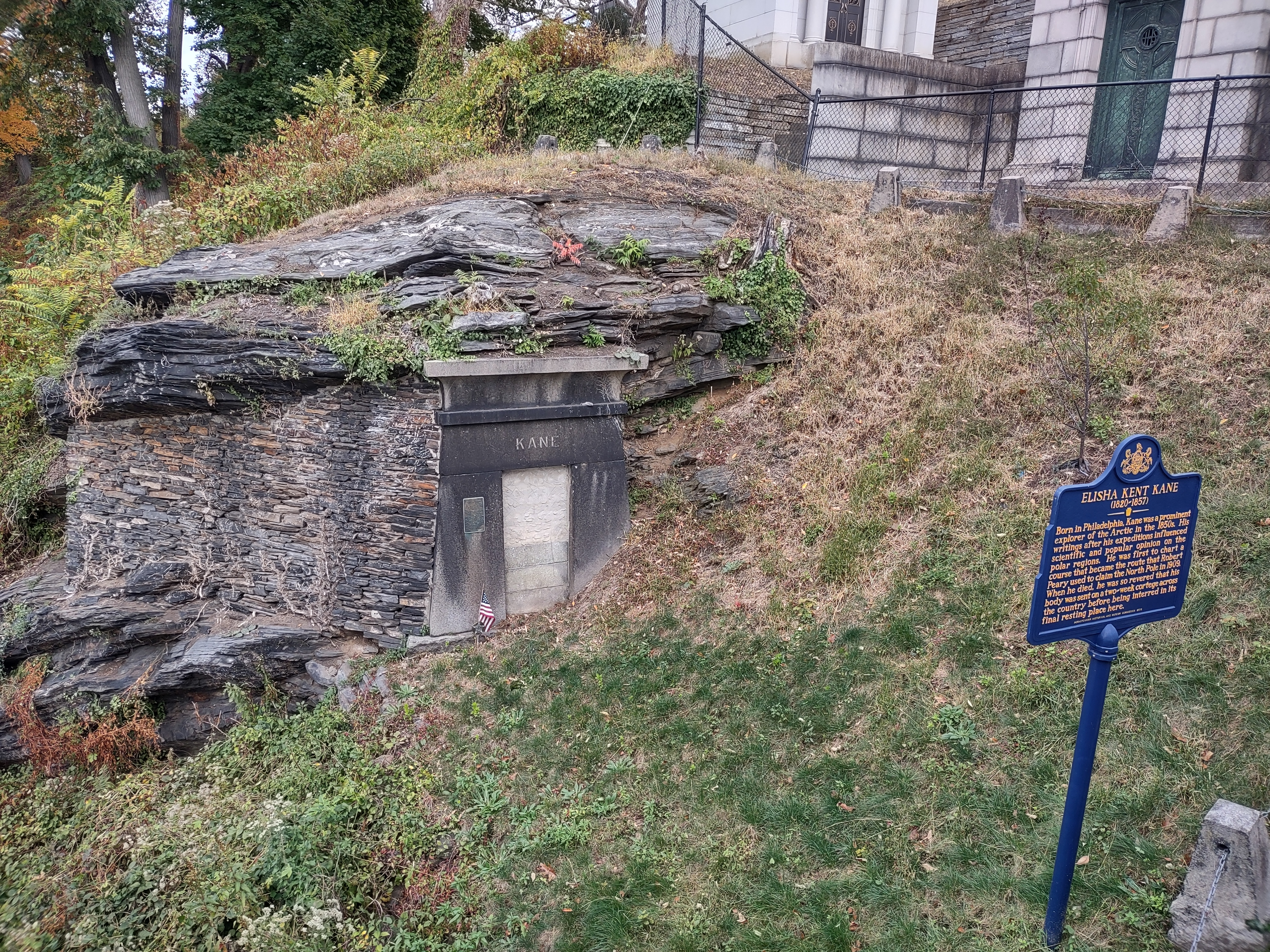
Kane's tomb in Laurel Hill Cemetery

After visiting England to fulfill his promise to deliver his report personally to Lady Jane Franklin, he sailed to Havana in an attempt to recover his health, after being advised to do so by his doctor. He died there on February 16, 1857. His body was escorted to New Orleans by the governor of Cuba and carried by steamboat and a funeral train to Philadelphia. His funeral was the largest in American history until it was surpassed by that of Abraham Lincoln. After lying in state at Independence Hall, he was transported to Philadelphia's Laurel Hill Cemetery where he was placed in the hillside family vault.

Kane received medals from Congress, the Royal Geographical Society, and the Société de géographie. The Geographical Society of Philadelphia created the Elisha Kent Kane Medal in his honor. In 1851, Kane was elected as a member of the American Philosophical Society. He was also elected to the American Antiquarian Society in 1855.

The Anoatok historic manor at Kane, Pennsylvania, was named to honor Kane's Arctic expeditions. The destroyer USS Kane (DD-235) was named for him, as was a later oceanographic research ship, the USNS Kane (T-AGS-27). A lunar crater, Kane, was also named for him. In 1986, the U.S. Postal Service issued a 22 cent postage stamp in his honor, depicting his route to the Arctic. The waterway between Greenland and the northernmost Canadian islands, previously named Peabody Bay, was renamed Kane Basin in his honor. Cape Kane in Peary Land was named in his honor at the time that it was the nearest land to the North Pole that had been put on the map.

== In popular culture ==
The 2010 young adult book Tombstone Tea by Joanne Dahme is set in Laurel Hill Cemetery and has Kane as one of its characters.

In 1860 George W. Chapman of Milwaukee published a small volume of poetry which contained a lengthy tribute to the arctic physician-explorer Elisha Kent Kane. The poem, which is composed of rhyming couplets in iambic pentameter, runs from pages 1 to 31 of his book and terminates in a two-page "Notes" section which explicates some of the references in the poem. Before and after the discovery of his fate, many lyric poems were penned in memory of Sir John Franklin, (such as Joseph Addison Turner's 1858 "The Discovery of Sir John Franklin"). There was however little poetic literature published on America's arctic hero - Elisha Kent Kane. His premature death from rheumatic heart disease in 1857 at age 37 was unexpected and stunned the nation. Eulogies, orations and short verses were delivered during the obsequies held in his honor, but Chapman's "Tribute" is the only lengthy, 19th-century poetical piece published in hardcover.

== Bibliography ==
- The United States Grinnell Expedition in Search of Sir John Franklin: A Personal Narrative; Philadelphia: Childs & Peterson, 1856
- Arctic explorations: The Second Grinnell Expedition in Search of Sir John Franklin, 1853,'54, '55, Volume 1; Philadelphia: Childs & Peterson, 1857
