= 114th meridian west =

Line of longitude

114th meridian west

The meridian 114° west of Greenwich is a line of longitude that extends from the North Pole across the Arctic Ocean, North America, the Pacific Ocean, the Southern Ocean, and Antarctica to the South Pole.

114°W is the Fifth Meridian of the Dominion Land Survey in Canada.

The 114th meridian west forms a great circle with the 66th meridian east.

== From Pole to Pole ==
Starting at the North Pole and heading south to the South Pole, the 114th meridian west passes through:

Co-ordinates	Country, territory or sea	Notes
90°0′N 114°0′W	Arctic Ocean	
77°57′N 114°0′W	Canada	Northwest Territories — Brock Island
77°43′N 114°0′W	Ballantyne Strait	
77°19′N 114°0′W	Unnamed waterbody	Passing just west of Fitzwilliam Owen Island, Northwest Territories, Canada (at 77°7′N 113°54′W)
76°54′N 114°0′W	Canada	Northwest Territories — Emerald Isle
76°43′N 114°0′W	Unnamed waterbody	
76°16′N 114°0′W	Canada	Northwest Territories — Melville Island
75°28′N 114°0′W	Murray Inlet	
75°3′N 114°0′W	Liddon Gulf	
74°47′N 114°0′W	Canada	Northwest Territories — Melville Island
74°31′N 114°0′W	M'Clure Strait	
73°55′N 114°0′W	Parry Channel	Viscount Melville Sound
73°13′N 114°0′W	Canada	Northwest Territories — Victoria Island
72°48′N 114°0′W	Richard Collinson Inlet	
72°38′N 114°0′W	Canada	Northwest Territories — Victoria Island
70°42′N 114°0′W	Prince Albert Sound	
70°17′N 114°0′W	Canada	Northwest Territories — Victoria Island; Nunavut — from 70°0′N 114°0′W on Victoria Island
69°15′N 114°0′W	Dolphin and Union Strait	
68°23′N 114°0′W	Canada	Nunavut — mainland
68°14′N 114°0′W	Coronation Gulf	
67°58′N 114°0′W	Canada	Nunavut — Berens Islands and mainland Northwest Territories — from 65°57′N 114°0′W, passing through the Great Slave Lake; Alberta — from 60°0′N 114°0′W, passing through Calgary at 51°2′N 114°0′W
49°0′N 114°0′W	United States	Montana; Idaho — from 45°42′N 114°0′W; Utah — from 42°0′N 114°0′W; Arizona — from 37°0′N 114°0′W
32°14′N 114°0′W	Mexico	Sonora
31°31′N 114°0′W	Gulf of California	
29°34′N 114°0′W	Mexico	Baja California; Baja California Sur — from 28°0′N 114°0′W
26°58′N 114°0′W	Pacific Ocean	
60°0′S 114°0′W	Southern Ocean	
73°51′S 114°0′W	Antarctica	Unclaimed territory

== See also ==
- 113th meridian west
- 115th meridian west
