= Forecast region =

Unique geographical area for which individual weather reports are issued

A forecast region is a unique geographical area for which individual weather reports are issued.

== Canada ==
In Canada, the Meteorological Service divides the country into several forecast regions for the purpose of issuing routine text forecasts and weather warnings, as Canada's provinces and territories do not use a common second-level administrative division scheme similar to the division of states into counties and parishes in the United States. Due to the localized nature of some weather phenomena, such as freezing rain storms and tornadoes, some forecast regions that have been found to be more prone to such phenomena are further divided into sub-regions, especially in the Prairie provinces. Parts of Northern British Columbia, Northern Quebec, Labrador, and the territories do not belong to any forecast region, owing to the lack of any significant population in those areas.

With the implementation of Specific Area Message Encoding into the Weatheradio Canada service in 2007, each forecast region and sub-region has been given a unique six-digit code known as a Canadian Location Code, or CLC. These codes are programmed into SAME-capable weather radio receivers the same way FIPS county codes are programmed into receivers in the United States, enabling them to only activate and sound an alert when the MSC issues weather warnings for the forecast regions that have their codes programmed into the receivers. Outside of Nunavut and the Northwest Territories, CLCs are assigned using the format 0paabb, where 0 is a constant, p is a province or provincial or territorial grouping, aa refers to a specific forecast region, and bb, if nonzero, refers to a sub-region. In Nunavut and the Northwest Territories, where population densities are much lower than elsewhere in the country, the format is 09aaa0, where aaa refers to the forecast region. On the water, CLCs are assigned using the format 00aaab, where aaa refers to the forecast region, and b, if nonzero, refers to a sub-region. CLCs are also assigned to the areas of international waters for which Canada issues maritime navigation and weather warnings. For specific types of warnings, such as air quality alerts, coastal flood warnings and tsunami warnings, CLCs of the format 0p0aaa have been assigned.

=== List of forecast regions by province and territory ===
As of 2025, there are 1,312 forecast regions in Canada.

If viewing this page online, each forecast region name is linked to a page on the MSC's website detailing all watches and warnings currently in effect for that region.

Nova Scotia
CLC	Region
011100	Kings County
011200	Annapolis County
011300	Digby County
011400	Lunenburg County
011500	Queens County
011600	Shelburne County
011700	Yarmouth County
012100	Cumberland County - Minas Shore
012200	Cumberland County North and Cobequid Pass
012300	Colchester County - Cobequid Bay
012400	Colchester County North
012500	Hants County
012600	Colchester County - Truro and south
012700	Halifax Metro and Halifax County West
012800	Halifax County - east of Porters Lake
013100	Pictou County
013200	Guysborough County
013300	Antigonish County
014100	Richmond County
014200	Inverness County - south of Mabou
014300	Inverness County - Mabou and north
014400	Victoria County
014500	Sydney Metro and Cape Breton County

New Brunswick
CLC	Region
015100	Fredericton and southern York County
015200	Oromocto and Sunbury County
015300	Grand Lake and Queens County
015400	Sussex/Kennebecasis Valley and Kings County
015500	Saint John and County
015600	St. Stephen and northern Charlotte County
015700	Grand Manan and coastal Charlotte County
016100	Woodstock and Carleton County
016200	Stanley-Doaktown-Blackville Area
016300	Kent County
016400	Moncton and southeast New Brunswick
016500	Kouchibouguac National Park
016600	Fundy National Park
017100	Edmundston and Madawaska County
017210	Western half of Restigouche County
017220	Campbellton and eastern half of Restigouche County
017300	Grand Falls and Victoria County
017400	Mount Carleton-Renous Highway
017500	Bathurst and Chaleur Region
017600	Miramichi and Area
017700	Acadian Peninsula

Prince Edward Island
CLC	Region
018100	Kings County
018200	Prince County
018300	Queens County

Newfoundland and Labrador
CLC	Region
021100	Avalon Peninsula North
021200	Avalon Peninsula Southeast
021300	St. John's and vicinity
021400	Avalon Peninsula Southwest
022100	Burin Peninsula
022200	Connaigre
022300	Burgeo to Ramea
022400	Channel-Port aux Basques and vicinity
023100	Corner Brook and vicinity
023200	Deer Lake - Humber Valley
023300	Gros Morne
023400	Bay St. George
024100	Buchans and the Interior
024200	Grand Falls-Windsor and vicinity
025100	Bay of Exploits
025200	Bonavista North
025300	Bonavista Peninsula
025400	Clarenville and vicinity
025500	Gander and vicinity
025600	Green Bay - White Bay
025700	Terra Nova
026100	Northern Peninsula East
026200	Parson's Pond - Hawke's Bay
026300	Port Saunders and the Straits
027100	Red Bay to L'Anse-au-Clair
027200	Norman Bay to Lodge Bay
027300	Cartwright to Black Tickle
027400	Rigolet and vicinity
027500	Postville - Makkovik
027600	Hopedale and vicinity
027700	Nain and vicinity
028100	Upper Lake Melville
028200	Eagle River
028300	Churchill Valley
029100	Churchill Falls and vicinity
029200	Labrador City and Wabush

Quebec
CLC	Region]
031100	Gatineau
031200	Waskaganish
031310	Joutel - Matagami area
031320	Miquelon - Desmaraisville area
031410	La Sarre area
031420	Amos area
031430	Lebel-sur-Quévillon area
031440	Senneterre area
031450	Rouyn area
031460	Malartic area
031470	Val d'Or - Louvicourt area
031510	Ville-Marie area
031520	Témiscaming area
031610	Dorval Lodge area
031620	Le Domaine area
031710	Rapides-des-Joachims area
031720	Fort William - Shawville area
031810	Mont-Laurier area
031820	La Minerve - Rouge River area
031910	Low - Wakefield area
031920	Maniwaki - Gracefield area
031930	Papineauville - Chénéville area
031940	Papineau-Labelle Reserve area
031950	Lièvre River area
032110	Saint-Michel-des-Saints area
032120	Saint-Donat - Parc du Mont-Tremblant area
032210	Mont-Tremblant - Sainte-Agathe area
032220	Sainte-Adèle - Saint-Sauveur area
032310	Saint-Jérôme area
032320	Lachute area
032330	Saint-Eustache area
032410	Longueuil - Varennes area
032420	Laval area
032430	Montréal Island area
032440	Châteauguay - La Prairie area
032510	Soulanges area
032520	Vaudreuil area
032530	Saint-Rémi area
032540	Valleyfield - Beauharnois area
032550	Hemmingford area
032560	Huntingdon area
032610	Berthierville - Saint-Gabriel area
032620	Rawdon - Joliette area
032630	Mascouche area
032710	Louiseville area
032720	Matawin - Mauricie National Park area
032730	Lac-aux-Sables area
032740	Shawinigan area
032750	Sainte-Anne-de-la-Pérade area
032760	Trois-Rivières area
032811	Portneuf area
032812	Valcartier - Stoneham area
032813	Québec area
032814	Côte-de-Beaupré - L'Île d'Orléans area
032821	Bellechasse area
032822	Lévis area
032823	Saint-Lambert area
032824	Lotbinière area
033100	James-Bay and La-Grande-Rivière
033200	LG-Quatre - Laforge and Fontanges
033300	Schefferville
033400	Fermont
034100	Chibougamau
034210	Gouin Reservoir area
034220	Parent area
034310	Ashuapmushuan Wildlife Reserve area
034320	Normandin - Péribonka area
034330	Alma - Desbiens area
034340	Saint-Félicien - Roberval area
034410	Lake Bouchette area
034420	La Tuque area
034510	Manic-5 area
034520	Manic-3 area
034530	Chutes-des-Passes - Pipmuacan Reservoir area
034540	Labrieville area
034610	Forestville area
034620	Les Escoumins area
034710	Falardeau - Mont-Valin area
034720	Sainte-Rose-du-Nord area
034730	Ville de Saguenay area
034740	Rivière-Éternité - Petit-Saguenay area
034750	Tadoussac - Baie-Sainte-Catherine area
034810	La Malbaie area
034820	Baie-Saint-Paul area
034910	Apica Mountain area
034920	Grands-Jardins Park area
034930	l'Étape area
035110	Mont-Joli area
035120	Le Bic - Rimouski area
035130	Rimouski Wildlife Reserve area
035200	Matane
035310	Amqui area
035320	Matapédia area
035410	Grande-Vallée area
035420	Sainte-Anne-des-Monts area
035510	Murdochville area
035520	Mont-Albert area
035530	Grande-Rivière - Cascapédia area
035610	New-Richmond - Bonaventure area
035620	Restigouche - Carleton area
035710	Chandler area
035720	New Carlisle - Port-Daniel area
035810	Parc National Forillon - Gaspé area
035820	Percé area
036100	Baie-Comeau
036210	Baie-Trinité area
036220	Sept-Îles - Port-Cartier area
036300	Minganie
036400	Natashquan
036500	Chevery
036600	Blanc-Sablon
036700	Anticosti
036800	Îles-de-la-Madeleine
037110	Sorel - Yamaska area
037120	Saint-Hyacinthe - Acton Vale area
037130	Verchères - Beloeil area
037140	Saint-Jean - Marieville area
037150	Lacolle area
037210	Bécancour - Villeroy area
037220	Victoriaville area
037230	Nicolet area
037240	Drummondville area
037311	Granby - Waterloo area
037312	Brome-Missisquoi area
037321	Richmond area
037322	Weedon area
037323	Thetford Mines area
037331	Mont-Orford - Lake Memphrémagog area
037332	Sherbrooke area
037333	Coaticook area
037334	Lac-Mégantic area
037335	Cookshire area
037410	Lac-Etchemin area
037420	Sainte-Marie-de-Beauce area
037430	Saint-Georges-de-Beauce area
037510	Montmagny - Saint-Jean-Port-Joli area
037520	Saint-Fabien - Saint-Pamphile area
037610	Trois-Pistoles area
037620	Pohénégamook area
037630	Kamouraska area
037640	Rivière-du-Loup area
037700	Témiscouata
038100	Ivujivik
038200	Akulivik
038300	Puvirnituq
038400	Inukjuak
038500	Umiujaq
038600	Kuujjuarapik
039100	Salluit - Raglan Lake
039200	Kangiqsujuaq
039300	Quaqtaq
039400	Kangirsuk
039500	Aupaluk
039600	Tasiujaq
039700	Kuujjuaq
039800	Kangiqsualujjuaq

Ontario
CLC	Region]
041100	Simcoe - Delhi - Norfolk
041200	Dunnville - Caledonia - Haldimand
041310	Watford - Pinery Park - Eastern Lambton County
041320	Sarnia - Petrolia - Western Lambton County
041410	Chatham-Kent - Rondeau Park
041420	Windsor - Leamington - Essex County
041510	London - Parkhill - Eastern Middlesex County
041520	Strathroy - Komoka - Western Middlesex County
041610	St. Thomas - Aylmer - Eastern Elgin County
041620	Rodney - Shedden - Western Elgin County
041710	Woodstock - Tillsonburg - Oxford County
041720	Brantford - County of Brant
042100	Attawapiskat
042200	Fort Severn
042300	Peawanuck
042410	Sachigo Lake - Bearskin Lake
042420	Big Trout Lake - Kasabonika
042510	Sandy Lake - Weagamow Lake - Deer Lake
042520	Pikangikum - Poplar Hill - MacDowell
042610	Summer Beaver - Wunnummin Lake - Kingfisher Lake
042620	Pickle Lake - Cat Lake
042710	Webequie
042720	Fort Hope - Lansdowne House - Ogoki
043100	City of Toronto
043210	Uxbridge - Beaverton - Northern Durham Region
043220	Newmarket - Georgina - Northern York Region
043230	Pickering - Oshawa - Southern Durham Region
043240	Vaughan - Richmond Hill - Markham
043310	Belleville - Quinte West - Eastern Northumberland County
043320	Cobourg - Colborne - Western Northumberland County
043410	Tamworth - Sydenham - South Frontenac
043420	Stirling - Tweed - Madoc
043510	Kingston - Odessa - Frontenac Islands
043520	Napanee - Consecon
043530	Picton - Sandbanks Park
043610	Merrickville-Wolford - Kemptville
043620	Westport - Charleston Lake
043630	Brockville - Prescott
043640	Gananoque - Mallorytown
043710	Maxville - Alexandria
043720	Cornwall - Lancaster
043730	Winchester - Newington
043740	Morrisburg - Long Sault
044110	Midland - Coldwater - Orr Lake
044120	Orillia - Lagoon City - Washago
044130	Barrie - Collingwood - Hillsdale
044210	South River - Burk's Falls
044220	Bayfield Inlet - Dunchurch
044310	Deep River - Whitney - Eastern Algonquin Park
044320	Western Algonquin Park - Lake of Two Rivers
044410	Huntsville - Baysville
044420	Town of Parry Sound - Rosseau - Killbear Park
044430	Port Carling - Port Severn
044440	Bracebridge - Gravenhurst
044510	Oxtongue Lake - Fort Irwin - Northern Haliburton County
044520	Haliburton - Minden - Southern Haliburton County
044610	Bancroft - Hastings Highlands - Denbigh
044620	Kaladar - Bannockburn - Bon Echo Park
044710	Fenelon Falls - Balsam Lake Park - Northern Kawartha Lakes
044720	Apsley - Woodview - Northern Peterborough County
044730	Lindsay - Southern Kawartha Lakes
044740	Peterborough City - Lakefield - Southern Peterborough County
045100	Prescott and Russell
045210	Petawawa - Pembroke - Cobden
045220	Barry's Bay - Killaloe
045230	Renfrew - Arnprior - Calabogie
045310	Smiths Falls - Perth - Eastern Lanark County
045320	Plevna - Sharbot Lake - Western Lanark County
045410	Ottawa North - Kanata - Orléans
045420	Ottawa South - Richmond - Metcalfe
046100	City of Hamilton
046210	Bruce Peninsula - Sauble Beach - Tobermory
046220	Owen Sound - Blue Mountains - Northern Grey County
046230	Saugeen Shores - Kincardine - Southern Bruce County
046240	Hanover - Dundalk - Southern Grey County
046310	Wingham - Blyth - Northern Huron County
046320	Listowel - Milverton - Northern Perth County
046330	Goderich - Bluewater - Southern Huron County
046340	Stratford - Mitchell - Southern Perth County
046410	Mount Forest - Arthur - Northern Wellington County
046420	Guelph - Erin - Southern Wellington County
046430	Kitchener - Cambridge - Region of Waterloo
046510	Innisfil - New Tecumseth - Angus
046520	Shelburne - Mansfield - Northern Dufferin County
046530	Orangeville - Grand Valley - Southern Dufferin County
046610	Caledon
046620	Mississauga - Brampton
046630	Halton Hills - Milton
046640	Burlington - Oakville
046710	St. Catharines - Grimsby - Northern Niagara Region
046720	Niagara Falls - Welland - Southern Niagara Region
047110	Red Lake - Woodland Caribou Park
047120	Ear Falls - Perrault Falls - Western Lac Seul
047210	Savant Lake - Sturgeon Lake
047220	Sioux Lookout - Eastern Lac Seul
047310	Kenora - Grassy Narrows - Whitedog
047320	Sioux Narrows - Nestor Falls - Morson
047410	Dryden - Vermilion Bay
047420	Ignace - English River
047510	Fort Frances - Emo - Rainy River
047520	Seine River Village - Mine Centre
048100	City of Thunder Bay
048210	Armstrong - Auden - Wabakimi Park
048220	Beardmore - Jellicoe - Macdiarmid
048230	Gull Bay - Black Sturgeon Lake
048310	Nakina - Aroland - Pagwa
048320	Geraldton - Longlac - Caramat
048330	Manitouwadge - Hornepayne
048410	Upsala - Raith
048420	Atikokan - Shebandowan - Quetico Park
048510	Cloud Bay - Dorion
048520	Kakabeka Falls - Whitefish Lake - Arrow Lake
048610	Nipigon - Rossport
048620	Marathon - Schreiber
048710	White River - Dubreuilville
048720	Wawa - Pukaskwa Park
048810	Agawa - Lake Superior Park
048820	Searchmont - Montreal River Harbour - Batchawana Bay
048830	Sault Ste. Marie - St. Joseph Island
049100	Greater Sudbury and vicinity
049200	Elliot Lake - Ranger Lake
049310	Fort Albany
049320	Moosonee
049410	Fraserdale - Pledger Lake
049420	Kapuskasing - Hearst - Smooth Rock Falls
049510	Little Abitibi - Kesagami Lake
049520	Timmins - Cochrane - Iroquois Falls
049610	Chapleau - Missinaibi Lake
049620	Gogama - Foleyet
049710	Kirkland Lake - Englehart
049720	Temiskaming Shores - Temagami
049810	West Nipissing - French River
049820	North Bay - Powassan - Mattawa
049910	Blind River - Thessalon
049920	Espanola - Killarney
049930	Manitoulin Island

Manitoba
CLC	Region
051110	R.M. of Wallace-Woodworth incl. Virden Elkhorn and Kenton
051130	Riverdale Mun. incl. Rivers and Wheatland
051140	R.M. of Whitehead incl. Alexander and Beresford
051150	R.M. of Sifton incl. Oak Lake and Deleau
051160	R.M. of Pipestone incl. Oak Lake Res.
051170	Mun. of Souris-Glenwood
051211	R.M. of Elton incl. Forrest
051212	R.M. of Cornwallis west of Shilo incl. Chater
051213	Mun. of Oakland-Wawanesa incl. Carroll
051220	City of Brandon
051231	Mun. of North Cypress-Langford incl. Neepawa and Carberry
051232	Mun. of Glenboro-South Cypress incl. Treesbank
051241	Mun. of North Norfolk incl. MacGregor Sidney and Austin
051242	Mun. of Norfolk Treherne
051243	R.M. of Victoria incl. Holland and Cypress River
051310	Mun. of Grassland incl. Hartney and Minto
051320	Mun. of Two Borders incl. Melita Coulter and Tilston
051331	Mun. of Brenda-Waskada incl. Medora and Goodlands
051332	Mun. of Deloraine-Winchester
051340	Mun. of Boissevain-Morton incl. Turtle Mtn Prov. Park
051412	Mun. of Killarney-Turtle Mountain
051422	R.M. of Argyle incl. Baldur Glenora and Greenway
051431	Cartwright-Roblin Mun. incl. Mather
051432	Mun. of Louise incl. Pilot Mound and Crystal City
051441	Mun. of Lorne incl. Notre Dame and Swan Lake
051442	Mun. of Pembina incl. Manitou La Rivière and Snowflake
051450	R.M. of Prairie Lakes incl. Margaret Ninette and Belmont
052100	City of Winnipeg
052212	R.M. of Coldwell incl. Lundar and Clarkleigh
052223	R.M. of Gimli incl. Winnipeg Beach and Arnes
052231	R.M. of St. Laurent incl. Oak Point
052232	R.M. of Woodlands incl. Warren and Lake Francis
052240	R.M. of Rockwood incl. Teulon Stonewall and Stony Mountain
052251	R.M. of Rosser incl. Meadows
052252	R.M. of West St. Paul incl. Middlechurch and Rivercrest
052260	R.M. of Armstrong incl. Chatfield Inwood and Narcisse
052270	R.M. of St. Andrews incl. Selkirk Lockport and Ponemah
052310	R.M. of Portage la Prairie incl. St. Ambroise
052321	R.M. of St. François Xavier
052322	R.M. of Cartier incl. Elie St. Eustache and Springstein
052323	R.M. of Headingley
052331	R.M. of Grey incl. St. Claude Elm Creek and Fannystelle
052332	R.M. of Dufferin incl. Carman Roseisle and Homewood
052340	R.M. of Macdonald incl. Brunkild Starbuck and La Salle
052410	R.M. of St. Clements incl. Grand Beach Brokenhead and Libau
052422	R.M. of Brokenhead incl. Beausejour and Garson
052431	R.M. of Springfield incl. Anola and Birds Hill Prov. Park
052433	R.M. of East St. Paul incl. Birds Hill
052510	R.M. of Morris incl. Rosenort and Aubigny
052520	R.M. of Thompson incl. Miami Rosebank and Deerwood
052530	R.M. of Roland incl. Jordan and Myrtle
052540	R.M. of Montcalm incl. St. Jean Baptiste
052550	Mun. of Rhineland incl. Altona Plum Coulee and Gretna
052560	R.M. of Stanley incl. Winkler and Morden
052611	R.M. of Ritchot incl. St. Adolphe and Ste. Agathe
052612	R.M. of Tache incl. Lorette Ste-Geneviève and Landmark
052620	R.M. of De Salaberry incl. St-Pierre-Jolys and St. Malo
052630	R.M. of Hanover incl. Steinbach Niverville and Grunthal
052641	R.M. of Ste. Anne incl. Richer
052642	R.M. of La Broquerie incl. Marchand
052651	Mun. of Emerson-Franklin incl. Roseau River
052652	R.M. of Stuartburn incl. Zhoda Vita and Sundown
053110	Manigotagan Black River Res. and Hollow Water Res.
053120	Bissett
053130	Nopiming Prov. Park
053140	R.M. of Alexander incl. Powerview-Pine Falls
053150	R.M. of Victoria Beach
053211	R.M. of Lac Du Bonnet
053221	L.G. of Pinawa incl. Seven Sisters Falls
053222	R.M. of Whitemouth incl. Elma
053231	Pointe du Bois
053232	Falcon Lake and West Hawk Lake
053243	Shoal Lake Reserves
053250	R.M. of Reynolds incl. Ste. Rita Hadashville and Rennie
053310	Buffalo Point Res. and Northwest Angle Prov. Forest
053320	R.M. of Piney incl. Sandilands and Sprague
054110	Grand Rapids and Easterville
054120	Waterhen Meadow Portage and Skownan
054210	R.M. of Grahamdale incl. Gypsumville Moosehorn and Camper
054221	Jackhead Res.
054230	R.M. of West Interlake incl. Eriksdale and Ashern
054242	Mun. of Bifrost-Riverton incl. Arborg Hnausa and Hecla
054243	Moose Creek Prov. Forest Pine Dock and Matheson Island
054250	R.M. of Fisher incl. Poplarfield
054260	Peguis Res. and Fisher River Res.
055110	Mun. of Roblin incl. Makaroff Shortdale and Bield
055121	R.M. of Dauphin incl. Sifton and Valley River
055122	Mun. of Ethelbert incl. Garland
055123	Gilbert Plains Mun. incl. Ashville
055131	Mossey River Mun. incl. Winnipegosis and Fork River
055132	Grandview Mun. incl. Valley River Res.
055133	R.M. of Lakeshore incl. Ochre River and Makinak
055140	R.M. of Riding Mountain West incl. Asessippi Prov. Park
055150	Mun. of Russell-Binscarth incl. Gambler Res.
055160	R.M. of Lakeshore incl. Rorketon and Toutes Aides
055210	Mun. of Harrison Park incl. Onanole Sandy Lake and Newdale
055221	Rossburn Mun. incl. Waywayseecappo Res.
055222	Riding Mountain Nat. Park
055230	R.M. of Ellice-Archie incl. St-Lazare McAuley and Manson
055241	R.M. of Yellowhead incl. Shoal Lake and Elphinstone
055242	Prairie View Mun. incl. Birdtail Sioux Res.
055243	Hamiota Mun. incl. McConnell and Lavinia
055251	R.M. of Oakview incl. Oak River and Rapid City
055252	R.M. of Minto-Odanah incl. Minnedosa and Moore Park
055253	Mun. of Clanwilliam-Erickson
055260	R.M. of Rosedale incl. Eden and Kelwood
055310	R.M. of Alonsa incl. Ebb and Flow Res. and Sandy Bay Res.
055321	Mun. of Ste. Rose incl. Laurier
055331	Mun. of McCreary incl. Norgate
055340	Mun. of Glenella-Lansdowne incl. Arden and Tenby
055350	Mun. of WestLake-Gladstone incl. Plumas and Langruth
056110	The Pas Cormorant Westray and Wanless
056120	North and South Moose Lake incl. Moose Lake Res.
056211	Westgate Red Deer Lake and Barrows
056212	Porcupine Prov. Forest
056221	R.M. of Mountain including Mafeking and Birch River
056222	Pelican Rapids and Shoal River First Nations
056231	Mun. of Swan Valley West incl. Benito
056232	Mun. of Minitonas-Bowsman incl. Renwer
056241	Duck Mountain Prov. Park and Prov. Forest
056242	R.M. of Mountain including Cowan and Camperville
057110	Molson Lake and Bear Lake
057120	Cross Lake and Jenpeg
057130	Wabowden
057140	Hwy 6between Little Limestone Lake and Ponton
057150	Norway House
057200	Poplar River
057310	Berens River
057320	Little Grand Rapids and Atikaki Prov. Park
057330	Bloodvein
058100	Brochet
058200	Tadoule Lake
058310	Lynn Lake
058320	Leaf Rapids
058330	Pukatawagan
058410	South Indian Lake and Amisk Prov. Park
058420	Split Lake and York Landing
058430	Thompson Thicket Portage and Pikwitonei
058440	Nelson House
058510	Snow Lake and Herb Lake Landing
058520	Flin Flon Cranberry Portage and Grass River Prov. Park
059100	Churchill
059200	York
059300	Gillam
059400	Shamattawa
059510	Oxford House and Gods Lake
059520	Red Sucker Lake
059530	Island Lake

Saskatchewan
CLC	Region
061111	R.M. of Deer Forks including Burstall and Estuary
061112	R.M. of Happyland including Leader Prelate and Mendham
061113	R.M. of Enterprise including Richmound
061114	R.M. of Fox Valley including Fox Valley
061115	R.M. of Big Stick including Golden Prairie
061121	R.M. of Clinworth including Sceptre Lemsford and Portreeve
061122	R.M. of Miry Creek including Abbey Lancer and Shackleton
061123	R.M. of Pittville including Hazlet
061131	R.M. of Piapot including Piapot
061132	R.M. of Gull Lake including Gull Lake and Tompkins
061133	R.M. of Carmichael including Carmichael
061211	R.M. of Lacadena including Kyle Tyner and Sanctuary
061212	R.M. of Victory including Beechy
061213	R.M. of Canaan including Lucky Lake
061221	R.M. of Riverside including Cabri Pennant and Success
061222	R.M. of Saskatchewan Landing including Stewart Valley
061223	R.M. of Webb including Webb and Antelope lake
061224	R.M. of Swift Current including Swift Current and Wymark
061225	R.M. of Lac Pelletier including Blumenhof
061231	R.M. of Excelsior including Waldeck Rush Lake and Main Centre
061232	R.M. of Morse including Herbert Morse Ernfold and Gouldtown
061233	R.M. of Coulee including Neidpath and McMahon
061234	R.M. of Lawtonia including Hodgeville
061235	R.M. of Glen Bain including Glen Bain
061236	R.M. of Whiska Creek including Vanguard Neville and Pambrun
061311	R.M. of Maple Creek including Maple Creek
061312	R.M. of Maple Creek including Cypress Hills Prov. Park
061313	R.M. of Reno including Consul Robsart and Willow Creek
061321	R.M. of Arlington including Dollard
061322	R.M. of White Valley including Eastend and Ravenscrag
061323	R.M. of Frontier including Frontier and Claydon
061331	R.M. of Bone Creek including Simmie and Scotsguard
061332	R.M. of Grassy Creek including Shaunavon
061333	R.M. of Wise Creek including Cadillac and Admiral
061341	R.M. of Lone Tree including Climax and Bracken
061342	R.M. of Val Marie including Val Marie Orkney and Monchy
061351	R.M. of Auvergne including Ponteix and Aneroid
061352	R.M. of Pinto Creek including Kincaid and Hazenmore
061353	R.M. of Glen McPherson west of Mankota
061354	R.M. of Mankota including Mankota and Ferland
062100	City of Regina
062211	R.M. of Maple Bush including Riverhurst and Douglas Prov. Park
062212	R.M. of Huron including Tugaske
062213	R.M. of Enfield including Central Butte
062214	R.M. of Eyebrow including Eyebrow and Brownlee
062221	R.M. of Craik including Craik and Aylesbury
062222	R.M. of Sarnia including Holdfast Chamberlain and Dilke
062223	R.M. of Marquis including Tuxford Keeler and Buffalo Pound
062224	R.M. of Dufferin including Bethune and Findlater
062231	R.M. of Chaplin including Chaplin
062232	R.M. of Wheatlands including Mortlach and Parkbeg
062233	R.M. of Shamrock including Shamrock and Kelstern
062234	R.M. of Rodgers including Coderre and Courval
062241	R.M. of Caron including Caronport and Caron
062242	R.M. of Moose Jaw including Pasqua and Bushell Park
062243	R.M. of Pense including Pense Belle Plaine and Stony Beach
062244	City of Moose Jaw
062245	R.M. of Hillsborough including Crestwynd and Old Wives lake
062246	R.M. of Redburn including Rouleau and Hearne
062247	R.M. of Baildon including Briercrest
062311	R.M. of McKillop including Strasbourg and Rowans Ravine Prov. Park
062312	R.M. of Longlaketon including Earl Grey and Silton
062313	R.M. of Lumsden including Lumsden Regina Beach and Craven
062321	R.M. of Cupar including Southey Cupar and Markinch
062322	R.M. of Lipton including Lipton and Dysart
062323	R.M. of Tullymet including Peepeekisis Res.
062331	R.M. of Sherwood including Grand Coulee
062332	R.M. of Bratt's Lake including Wilcox Corinne and Estlin
062341	R.M. of Lajord including Lajord Kronau and Riceton
062342	R.M. of Francis including Vibank Sedley and Odessa
062343	R.M. of Montmartre including Assiniboine Res.
062351	R.M. of Edenwold including Balgonie and Piapot Res.
062352	R.M. of North Qu'Appelle including Fort Qu'Appelle
062353	R.M. of South Qu'Appelle including Qu'Appelle and Edgeley
062361	R.M. of Abernethy including Balcarres and Abernethy
062362	R.M. of Indian Head including Indian Head and Sintaluta
062411	R.M. of Gravelbourg including Gravelbourg and Bateman
062412	R.M. of Sutton including Mazenod Palmer and Vantage
062413	R.M. of Wood River including Lafleche Woodrow and Melaval
062414	R.M. of Stonehenge including Limerick and Congress
062421	R.M. of Waverley including Glentworth and Fir Mountain
062422	R.M. of Old Post including Wood Mountain and Killdeer
062431	R.M. of Lake Johnson including Mossbank and Ardill
062432	R.M. of Terrell including Spring Valley and Cardross
062433	R.M. of Lake of The Rivers including Assiniboia
062434	R.M. of Excel including Viceroy Ormiston and Verwood
062441	R.M. of Willow Bunch including Willow Bunch and St Victor
062442	R.M. of Poplar Valley including Rockglen and Fife Lake
062443	R.M. of Hart Butte including Coronach
062451	R.M. of Elmsthorpe including Avonlea and Truax
062452	R.M. of Key West including Ogema and Kayville
062461	R.M. of Bengough including Bengough
062462	R.M. of The Gap including Ceylon and Hardy
062463	R.M. of Happy Valley including Big Beaver
062464	R.M. of Surprise Valley including Minton and Regway
062511	R.M. of Caledonia including Milestone and Parry
062512	R.M. of Scott including Yellow Grass Lang and Lewvan
062513	R.M. of Norton including Pangman and Khedive
062514	R.M. of Brokenshell including Trossachs
062521	R.M. of Wellington including Cedoux Colfax and Tyvan
062522	R.M. of Fillmore including Fillmore Creelman and Osage
062523	R.M. of Weyburn including Weyburn and McTaggart
062524	R.M. of Griffin including Griffin and Froude
062531	R.M. of Laurier including Radville
062532	R.M. of Lomond including Colgate and Goodwater
062533	R.M. of Lake Alma including Lake Alma and Beaubier
062534	R.M. of Souris Valley including Tribune and Oungre
062541	R.M. of Cymri including Midale Macoun and Halbrite
062542	R.M. of Benson including Benson
062543	R.M. of Cambria including Torquay and Outram
062544	R.M. of Estevan including Estevan and Hitchcock
063111	R.M. of Garry including Jedburgh
063112	R.M. of Orkney including Yorkton Springside and Ebenezer
063113	R.M. of Stanley including Goodeve Fenwood and Duff
063114	R.M. of Cana including Melville
063121	R.M. of McLeod including Lemberg and Neudorf
063122	R.M. of Grayson including Grayson Dubuc and Killaly
063131	R.M. of Wallace including Rhein Stornoway Tonkin and Rokeby
063132	R.M. of Calder including Calder and Wroxton
063133	R.M. of Saltcoats including Saltcoats and Bredenbury
063134	R.M. of Churchbridge including Churchbridge and MacNutt
063141	R.M. of Fertile Belt including Esterhazy Stockholm and Bangor
063142	R.M. of Langenburg including Langenburg Yarbo and Marchwell
063143	R.M. of Spy Hill including Spy Hill Gerald and Tantallon
063211	R.M. of Wolseley including Wolseley and Summerberry
063212	R.M. of Elcapo including Broadview and Cowessess Res.
063221	R.M. of Chester including Windthorst Glenavon and Peebles
063222	R.M. of Hazelwood south of Kipling
063223	R.M. of Golden West including Ocean Man Res. and Handsworth
063224	R.M. of Kingsley including Kipling
063231	R.M. of Silverwood south of Whitewood
063232	R.M. of Wawken including Wawota Kennedy and Kenosee Lake
063241	R.M. of Martin including Wapella and Red Jacket
063242	R.M. of Moosomin including Moosomin Welwyn and Fleming
063243	R.M. of Walpole including Kelso
063244	R.M. of Maryfield including Maryfield and Fairlight
063251	R.M. of Willowdale including Whitewood and Ochapowace Res.
063252	R.M. of Rocanville including Rocanville
063311	R.M. of Tecumseh including Stoughton Forget and Heward
063312	R.M. of Brock including Arcola and Kisbey
063321	R.M. of Browning including Lampman
063322	R.M. of Coalfields including Bienfait and North Portal
063331	R.M. of Moose Creek including Alameda
063332	R.M. of Enniskillen including Oxbow and Northgate
063341	R.M. of Moose Mountain including Carlyle and Manor
063342	R.M. of Antler including Redvers Antler and Wauchope
063351	R.M. of Storthoaks including Storthoaks and Fertile
063352	R.M. of Reciprocity including Alida
063353	R.M. of Mount Pleasant including Carnduff
063354	R.M. of Argyle including Gainsborough and Carievale
064110	R.M. of Hudson Bay including Shoal Lake and Red Earth Reserves
064120	R.M. of Hudson Bay including Hudson Bay and Reserve
064130	R.M. of Porcupine including Porcupine Plain and Weekes
064211	R.M. of Hazel Dell including Lintlaw and Hazel Dell
064212	R.M. of Preeceville including Preeceville and Sturgis
064213	R.M. of Invermay including Invermay and Rama
064214	R.M. of Buchanan including Buchanan Amsterdam and Tadmore
064221	R.M. of Insinger including Theodore and Sheho
064222	R.M. of Good Lake including Canora and Good Spirit Lake Prov. Park
064231	R.M. of Keys including The Key Res.
064232	R.M. of St Philips including Pelly and St Philips
064233	R.M. of Sliding Hills including Veregin Mikado and Hamton
064234	R.M. of Cote including Kamsack Togo and Duck Mountain Prov. Park
064241	R.M. of Clayton including Norquay Stenen and Swan Plain
064242	R.M. of Livingston including Arran
065100	City of Saskatoon
065211	R.M. of Spiritwood including Spiritwood and Leoville
065212	R.M. of Canwood including Debden and Big River Res.
065221	R.M. of Meeting Lake
065222	R.M. of Leask including Leask Mistawasis Res. and Parkside
065230	R.M. of Shellbrook including Sturgeon Lake Res.
065240	R.M. of Duck Lake including Duck Lake and Beardy's Res.
065251	District of Lakeland including Emma Lake and Anglin Lake
065252	R.M. of Paddockwood including Candle Lake and Paddockwood
065261	R.M. of Buckland including Wahpeton Res. and Spruce Home
065262	R.M. of Garden River including Meath Park and Albertville
065263	City of Prince Albert
065271	R.M. of Prince Albert including Davis
065272	R.M. of Birch Hills including Muskoday Res.
065273	R.M. of St Louis including One Arrow Res. and Domremy
065310	R.M. of Torch River including Choiceland and White Fox
065321	R.M. of Nipawin including Nipawin Aylsham and Pontrilas
065322	R.M. of Moose Range including Carrot River and Tobin Lake
065331	R.M. of Kinistino including Kinistino and James Smith Res.
065332	R.M. of Invergordon including Yellow Creek and Tarnopol
065333	R.M. of Flett's Springs including Beatty Ethelton and Pathlow
065334	R.M. of Three Lakes including Middle Lake and St Benedict
065335	R.M. of Lake Lenore including St. Brieux
065341	R.M. of Willow Creek including Gronlid and Fairy Glen
065342	R.M. of Connaught including Ridgedale and New Osgoode
065343	R.M. of Star City including Melfort and Star City
065344	R.M. of Tisdale including Tisdale Eldersley and Sylvania
065345	R.M. of Pleasantdale including Naicam and Pleasantdale
065346	R.M. of Barrier Valley including Archerwill and McKague
065351	R.M. of Arborfield including Arborfield and Zenon Park
065352	R.M. of Bjorkdale including Greenwater Lake Prov. Park
065411	R.M. of Redberry including Hafford and Krydor
065412	R.M. of Blaine Lake including Blaine Lake
065413	R.M. of Great Bend including Radisson and Borden
065421	R.M. of Laird including Waldheim Hepburn and Laird
065422	R.M. of Rosthern including Rosthern Hague and Carlton
065431	R.M. of Eagle Creek including Arelee and Sonningdale
065432	R.M. of Corman Park including Martensville Warman and Langham
065433	R.M. of Perdue including Perdue and Kinley
065434	R.M. of Vanscoy including Delisle Asquith and Vanscoy
065441	R.M. of Aberdeen including Aberdeen
065442	R.M. of Fish Creek including Alvena
065443	R.M. of Hoodoo including Wakaw and Cudworth
065444	R.M. of Grant including Vonda Prud'homme and Smuts
065445	R.M. of Bayne including Bruno Peterson and Dana
065451	R.M. of Colonsay including Colonsay and Meacham
065452	R.M. of Viscount including Viscount and Plunkett
065453	R.M. of Blucher including Allan Clavet Bradwell and Elstow
065511	R.M. of Harris including Harris and Tessier
065512	R.M. of Montrose including Donovan and Swanson
065513	R.M. of Milden including Dinsmore Milden and Wiseton
065514	R.M. of Fertile Valley including Conquest Macrorie and Bounty
065515	R.M. of King George northwest of Lucky Lake
065516	R.M. of Coteau including Birsay and Danielson Prov. Park
065521	R.M. of Dundurn including Dundurn and Blackstrap Prov. Park
065522	R.M. of Rudy including Outlook and Glenside
065523	R.M. of Rosedale including Hanley
065524	R.M. of Loreburn including Elbow Loreburn and Hawarden
065531	R.M. of Lost River including South Allan and the Allan Hills
065532	R.M. of Morris including Watrous Young and Zelma
065533	R.M. of McCraney including Kenaston and Bladworth
065534	R.M. of Wood Creek including Simpson
065541	R.M. of Arm River including Davidson and Girvin
065542	R.M. of Willner west of Davidson
065543	R.M. of Big Arm including Imperial and Liberty
065611	R.M. of Humboldt including Humboldt Carmel and Fulda
065612	R.M. of St Peter including Muenster and Lake Lenore
065613	R.M. of Wolverine including Burr
065614	R.M. of Leroy including Leroy
065621	R.M. of Spalding including Spalding
065622	R.M. of Ponass Lake including Rose Valley Fosston and Nora
065623	R.M. of Lakeside including Watson and Quill Lake
065624	R.M. of Lakeview including Wadena and Clair
065631	R.M. of Usborne including Lanigan Drake and Guernsey
065632	R.M. of Prairie Rose including Jansen and Esk
065633	R.M. of Wreford including Nokomis and Venn
065634	R.M. of Mount Hope including Semans
065635	R.M. of Last Mountain Valley including Govan and Duval
065641	R.M. of Big Quill including Wynyard Dafoe and Kandahar
065642	R.M. of Elfros including Elfros Leslie and Mozart
065643	R.M. of Kutawa including Raymore Punnichy and Poorman Res.
065644	R.M. of Emerald including Wishart and Bankend
065645	R.M. of Touchwood including Serath and Touchwood Hills Prov. Park
065646	R.M. of Kellross including Kelliher and Lestock
065651	R.M. of Kelvington including Yellowquill Res.
065652	R.M. of Sasman including Margo Kylemore and Nut Mountain
065653	R.M. of Foam Lake including Foam Lake and Fishing Lake Res.
065654	R.M. of Ituna Bon Accord including Ituna and Hubbard
066110	R.M. of Meadow Lake including Waterhen Res.
066120	R.M. of Beaver River including Pierceland and Goodsoil
066130	Green Lake
066140	R.M. of Loon Lake including Loon Lake and Makwa
066150	R.M. of Big River including Big River and Chitek Lake
066211	R.M. of Frenchman Butte including St. Walburg
066212	R.M. of Mervin including Turtleford Mervin and Spruce Lake
066213	R.M. of Turtle River including Edam and Vawn
066221	R.M. of Britannia including Hillmond
066222	R.M. of Wilton including Lashburn Marshall and Lone Rock
066223	R.M. of Eldon including Maidstone and Waseca
066224	R.M. of Paynton including Paynton
066231	R.M. of Manitou Lake including Marsden
066232	R.M. of Hillsdale including Neilburg and Baldwinton
066233	R.M. of Senlac including Senlac
066234	R.M. of Round Valley including Unity
066241	R.M. of Cut Knife including Cut Knife
066242	R.M. of Battle River including Sweet Grass Res. and Delmas
066243	R.M. of Buffalo including Wilkie and Phippen
066251	R.M. of Parkdale including Glaslyn and Fairholme
066252	R.M. of Medstead including Medstead Belbutte and Birch Lake
066253	R.M. of Meota including Meota and The Battlefords Prov. Park
066254	R.M. of Round Hill including Rabbit Lake and Whitkow
066260	The Battlefords
066271	R.M. of North Battleford northwest of The Battlefords
066272	R.M. of Douglas including Speers Richard and Alticane
066273	R.M. of Mayfield including Maymont Denholm and Fielding
066280	R.M. of Glenside north of Biggar
066311	R.M. of Eye Hill including Macklin Denzil and Evesham
066312	R.M. of Grass Lake including Salvador and Reward
066313	R.M. of Heart's Hill including Cactus Lake
066314	R.M. of Progress including Kerrobert and Luseland
066321	R.M. of Tramping Lake including Scott and Revenue
066322	R.M. of Reford including Landis and Leipzig
066323	R.M. of Mariposa including Tramping Lake and Broadacres
066324	R.M. of Grandview including Handel and Kelfield
066331	R.M. of Rosemount including Cando and Traynor
066332	R.M. of Biggar including Biggar and Springwater
066341	R.M. of Antelope Park including Loverna and Hoosier
066342	R.M. of Prairiedale including Major and Smiley
066343	R.M. of Milton including Alsask and Marengo
066351	R.M. of Oakdale including Coleville
066352	R.M. of Winslow including Dodsland and Plenty
066353	R.M. of Kindersley including Kindersley Brock and Flaxcombe
066361	R.M. of Mountain View including Herschel and Stranraer
066362	R.M. of Marriott south of Biggar
066363	R.M. of Pleasant Valley including McGee and Fiske
066364	R.M. of St Andrews including Rosetown and Zealandia
066371	R.M. of Chesterfield including Eatonia and Mantario
066372	R.M. of Newcombe including Glidden and Madison
066381	R.M. of Monet including Elrose Wartime and Forgan
066382	R.M. of Snipe Lake including Eston and Plato
066400	City of Lloydminster (also included in Alberta, 075260)
067110	Buffalo Narrows and Peter Pond Lake
067120	Île à la Crosse and Beauval
067210	Hwy 165between hwys 2and 914including Pinehouse Lake
067220	Lac la Ronge Prov. Park including La Ronge
067230	Candle Lake Prov. Park and Narrow Hills Prov. Park
067240	Montreal Lake and Molanosa
067250	Prince Albert Nat. Park
067310	Hwy 135including Pelican Narrows and Sandy Bay
067320	Seabee Mine
067330	Hanson Lake Road east of Hwy 135including Creighton
067340	Hanson Lake Road between Hwys 165and 135
067350	Cumberland House
068100	Uranium City - Camsell Portage
068210	Fond-du-Lac
068220	Stony Rapids and Black Lake
068310	Cluff Lake Mine
068320	La Loche and Clearwater River Prov. Park
068400	Cree Lake - Key Lake
068500	Wollaston Lake - Collins Bay
068600	Southend - Brabant Lake - Kinoosao

Alberta
CLC	Region
071110	Jasper Nat. Park near Pocahontas
071120	Jasper Nat. Park near Jasper
071130	Jasper Nat. Park near and south of Sunwapta Falls
071210	Yellowhead Co. near Cadomin and Robb
071220	Clearwater Co. near Chungo Creek
071230	Clearwater Co. near Nordegg and Big Horn Res.
071240	Clearwater Co. near Ya-Ha-Tinda Ranch
071310	Brazeau Co. near Cynthia and Lodgepole
071320	Yellowhead Co. near Minnow and Wolf Lakes and Elk River
071330	O'Chiese 203Res. and Clearwater Co. near Sunchild Cree Res.
071340	Brazeau Co. near Brazeau Dam
071350	Clearwater Co. near Rocky Mtn House and Crimson Lake
071360	Clearwater Co. near Caroline and James River Bridge
071410	Clearwater Co. near Siffleur Wilderness Area
071420	Banff Nat. Park near Saskatchewan River Crossing
071430	Banff Nat. Park near Lake Louise
071440	Banff Nat. Park near Banff
071510	M.D. of Bighorn near Ghost River Wilderness
071520	M.D. of Bighorn near Canmore Exshaw and Ghost Lake
071530	Kananaskis Improvement District near Kananaskis Village
071540	Kananaskis Improvement District near Highwood House
072111	Lacombe Co. near Eckville
072112	Lacombe Co. near Lacombe Blackfalds and Bentley
072113	Lacombe Co. near Clive Alix and Mirror
072121	Red Deer Co. near Sylvan Lake and Stephansson House
072122	Red Deer Co. near Spruce View and Red Lodge Prov. Park
072123	Red Deer Co. near Penhold Innisfail and Bowden
072124	Red Deer Co. near Pine Lake
072125	Red Deer Co. near Elnora Lousana and Delburne
072131	Co. of Stettler near Stettler Nevis and Rochon Sands
072132	Co. of Stettler near Big Valley
072133	Co. of Stettler near Donalda
072134	Co. of Stettler near Botha and Gadsby
072135	Co. of Stettler near Byemoor and Endiang
072140	City of Red Deer
072150	Co. of Paintearth near Halkirk and Big Knife Prov. Park
072160	Flagstaff Co. near Forestburg and Galahad
072170	Camrose Co. near Bashaw and Meeting Creek
072180	Ponoka Co. near Ponoka and Maskwacis
072210	Mountain View Co. near Sundre
072220	Mountain View Co. near Olds and Didsbury
072230	Mountain View Co. near Cremona and Water Valley
072240	Mountain View Co. near Carstairs and Stirlingville
072250	Rocky View Co. near Airdrie and Crossfield
072260	Rocky View Co. near Bottrel and Madden
072270	Rocky View Co. near Cochrane
072311	Kneehill Co. near Torrington and Wimborne
072312	Kneehill Co. near Trochu and Huxley
072313	Kneehill Co. near Three Hills
072321	Kneehill Co. near Acme and Linden
072322	Kneehill Co. near Carbon
072331	Starland Co. near Rumsey and Rowley
072332	Starland Co. near Morrin and Munson
072333	Starland Co. near Michichi and Delia
072341	Wheatland Co. near Rockyford and Rosebud
072342	Wheatland Co. near Hwys 569and 848
072350	Town of Drumheller
072360	Rocky View Co. near Irricana Beiseker and Kathyrn
072370	S.A. 2near Finnegan and Little Fish Lake Prov. Park
072400	City of Calgary
072510	Rocky View Co. near Bragg Creek and Tsuu T'ina Res.
072521	Foothills Co. near Priddis and Brown-Lowery Prov. Park
072522	Foothills Co. near Diamond Valley
072523	Foothills Co. near Longview and Eden Valley Res.
072531	Foothills Co. near Okotoks and De Winton
072532	Foothills Co. near High River and Aldersyde
072533	Foothills Co. near Cayley
072541	M.D. of Willow Creek near Nanton and Parkland
072542	M.D. of Willow Creek near Claresholm and Stavely
072610	Rocky View Co. near Chestermere Dalroy and Dalemead
072620	Foothills Co. near Blackie
072631	Wheatland Co. near Strathmore Lyalta and Carseland
072632	Wheatland Co. near Standard and Gleichen
072633	Siksika Res. 146
072634	Wheatland Co. near Hussar
072641	Vulcan Co. near Arrowwood Herronton and Queenstown
072642	Vulcan Co. near Vulcan and Ensign
072643	Vulcan Co. near Carmangay and Champion
072644	Vulcan Co. near Lomond Travers and Little Bow Reservoirs
072645	Vulcan Co. near Milo
072651	Co. of Newell near Bassano
072652	Co. of Newell near Gem
072653	Co. of Newell near Brooks Rosemary and Duchess
072654	Co. of Newell near Scandia and Kinbrook Island Prov. Park
072660	M.D. of Taber near Enchant
073110	M.D. of Ranchland
073120	M.D. of Pincher Creek near Cowley Burmis and Maycroft
073130	Piikani Reserve
073140	Municipality of Crowsnest Pass including Coleman and Frank
073150	M.D. of Pincher Creek near Beauvais Lake Prov. Park
073160	M.D. of Pincher Creek near Pincher Creek and Twin Butte
073170	Waterton Lakes Nat. Park and Blood Res. 148A
073211	M.D. of Willow Creek near Granum and Peigan Timber Limit
073212	M.D. of Willow Creek near Fort Macleod
073221	Blood Res. 148including Stand Off
073222	Cardston Co. near Hill Spring and Glenwood
073231	Cardston Co. near Magrath and Woolford Prov. Park
073232	Cardston Co. near Del Bonita and Kimball
073241	Cardston Co. near Mountain View and Beazer
073242	Cardston Co. near Cardston and Carway
073311	Co. of Lethbridge near Coalhurst Nobleford and Barons
073312	Co. of Lethbridge near Picture Butte and Turin
073313	Co. of Lethbridge near Coaldale
073314	City of Lethbridge
073321	M.D. of Taber near Vauxhall and Hays
073322	M.D. of Taber near Taber and Barnwell
073323	M.D. of Taber near Grassy Lake and Hwys 877and 513
073331	Co. of Warner near Raymond Stirling and New Dayton
073332	Co. of Warner near Wrentham
073341	Co. of Warner near Warner
073342	Co. of Warner near Milk River and Coutts
073343	Co. of Warner near Writing-On-Stone Prov. Park
073350	Co. of Forty Mile near Skiff
074111	Co. of Paintearth near Castor and Fleet
074112	Co. of Paintearth near Brownfield
074113	Co. of Paintearth near Coronation and Throne
074121	S.A. 2near Spondin and Scapa
074122	S.A. 2near Hanna and Richdale
074123	S.A. 2near Sunnynook
074124	S.A. 2near Cessford Wardlow and Pollockville
074131	S.A. 4near Veteran and Consort
074132	S.A. 4near Hemaruka Wiste and Monitor Creek
074133	S.A. 4near Kirriemuir and Compeer
074141	S.A. 3near Youngstown
074142	S.A. 3near Big Stone Cappon and Gold Spur
074143	S.A. 3near Sedalia and New Brigden
074144	S.A. 3near Oyen and Cereal
074145	S.A. 3near Sibbald and Esther
074150	M.D. of Provost near Bodo
074160	M.D. of Acadia including Acadia Valley
074211	Cypress Co. near Tide Lake
074212	Cypress Co. near Suffield and Hwy 879
074221	S.A. 2near Iddesleigh and Dinosaur Prov. Park
074222	S.A. 2near Jenner and Atlee
074223	S.A. 2near Buffalo and Cavendish
074224	S.A. 2near Bindloss Empress and Social Plains
074231	Co. of Newell near Patricia
074232	Co. of Newell near Tilley and Rolling Hills
074241	Cypress Co. near CFB Suffield
074242	Cypress Co. near Bowell and Redcliff
074251	Cypress Co. near Seven Persons
074252	Cypress Co. near Dunmore and Woolchester
074253	Cypress Co. near Irvine and Walsh
074261	Cypress Co. near Bowmanton Schuler and Hilda
074262	Cypress Co. near McNeill and Sandy Point District Park
074270	City of Medicine Hat
074280	Co. of Forty Mile near Bow Island and Whitla
074310	Co. of Forty Mile near Foremost
074320	Co. of Forty Mile near Etzikom and Maleb
074330	Co. of Forty Mile near Orion and Manyberries
074340	Cypress Co. near Cypress Hills Prov. Park and Cressday
074350	Co. of Forty Mile near Aden and Kennedy Coulee
074360	Cypress Co. near Onefour and Wild Horse
075111	Lac La Biche Co. near Plamondon Hylo and Avenir
075112	Lac La Biche Co. near Heart Lake
075113	Lac La Biche Co. near Lac La Biche and Square Lake
075114	Lac La Biche Co. near Lakeland Prov. Park and Rec. Area
075115	Lac La Biche Co. near Fork Lake
075116	Improvement District 349including Cold Lake Air Weapons Range
075121	Smoky Lake Co. near Buffalo Lake and Kikino Smts
075122	Smoky Lake Co. near Vilna Saddle Lake and Whitefish Lake
075131	Co. of St. Paul near Ashmont St. Vincent and St. Lina
075132	Co. of St. Paul near St. Paul and Lafond
075133	Co. of St. Paul near Elk Point and St. Edouard
075134	Co. of St. Paul near Lindbergh and Frog Lake
075141	M.D. of Bonnyville near La Corey Wolf Lake and Truman
075142	M.D. of Bonnyville near Glendon and Moose Lake
075143	M.D. of Bonnyville near Bonnyville Ardmore and Kehewin Res.
075144	M.D. of Bonnyville near Cold Lake and City of Cold Lake
075145	M.D. of Bonnyville near Beaverdam
075146	M.D. of Bonnyville near Fishing Lake Smt
075211	Co. of Two Hills near Two Hills and Brosseau
075212	Co. of Two Hills near Myrnam and Derwent
075221	Co. of Minburn near Innisfree Lavoy and Ranfurly
075222	Co. of Minburn near Minburn and Mannville
075230	Beaver Co. near Viking and Kinsella
075241	Flagstaff Co. near Killam and Sedgewick
075242	Flagstaff Co. near Lougheed and Hardisty
075243	Flagstaff Co. near Alliance and Bellshill Lake
075251	Co. of Vermilion River near Vermilion
075252	Co. of Vermilion River near Islay and McNabb Sanctuary
075253	Co. of Vermilion River near Dewberry and Clandonald
075254	Co. of Vermilion River near Tulliby Lake
075255	Co. of Vermilion River near Kitscoty and Marwayne
075256	Co. of Vermilion River near Paradise Valley
075260	City of Lloydminster (also included in Saskatchewan, 066400)
075271	M.D. of Wainwright near Irma
075272	M.D. of Wainwright near Wainwright
075273	M.D. of Wainwright near Edgerton and Koroluk Landslide
075274	M.D. of Wainwright near Chauvin Dillberry Lake and Roros
075281	M.D. of Provost near Hughenden Amisk and Kessler
075282	M.D. of Provost near Czar Metiskow and Cadogan
075283	M.D. of Provost near Provost and Hayter
076110	Woodlands Co. near Fort Assiniboine Timeu and Topland
076121	Co. of Barrhead near Thunder Lake and Holmes Crossing
076122	Co. of Barrhead near Neerlandia Bloomsbury and Vega
076123	Co. of Barrhead near Barrhead and Lac la Nonne
076130	M.D. of Lesser Slave River near Chisholm and Cross Lake
076141	Westlock Co. near Larkspur Fawcett and Jarvie
076142	Westlock Co. near Westlock and Clyde
076151	Athabasca Co. near Athabasca and Island Lake
076152	Athabasca Co. near Rochester Colinton and Meanook
076153	Athabasca Co. near Grassland and Atmore
076154	Athabasca Co. near Boyle and Caslan
076160	Thorhild Co. near Newbrook and Long Lake Prov. Park
076210	Yellowhead Co. near MacKay Wildwood and Evansburg
076221	Lac Ste. Anne Co. near Mayerthorpe and Sangudo
076222	Lac Ste. Anne Co. near Cherhill and Glenevis
076223	Lac Ste. Anne Co. near Onoway and Lac Ste. Anne
076231	Parkland Co. near Entwistle Fallis and Tomahawk
076232	Parkland Co. near Wabamun Carvel and Keephills
076233	Parkland Co. near Spruce Grove and Stony Plain
076241	Sturgeon Co. near Rivière Qui Barre and Villeneuve
076242	Sturgeon Co. near Legal and Mearns
076243	Sturgeon Co. near Morinville Volmer and Big Lake
076310	Thorhild Co. near Thorhild Opal and Radway
076321	Sturgeon Co. near Bon Accord Gibbons and Namao
076322	Sturgeon Co. near Redwater
076331	Lamont Co. near Bruderheim Lamont and Peno Creek
076332	Lamont Co. near Andrew and Wostok
076333	Lamont Co. near Mundare Chipman and Ukrainian Village
076340	Smoky Lake Co. near Smoky Lake and Waskatenau
076350	Co. of Two Hills near Willingdon and Hairy Hill
076360	Fort Saskatchewan and Nrn Strathcona Co.
076370	Elk Island Nat. Park
076380	Co. of Minburn near Vegreville Inland and Warwick
076400	City of Edmonton - St. Albert - Sherwood Park
076510	Leduc Co. near Warburg Thorsby and Pigeon Lake
076520	Leduc Co. near Calmar and Devon
076530	Brazeau Co. near Drayton Valley and Breton
076540	Co. of Wetaskiwin near Pigeon Lake
076550	Co. of Wetaskiwin near Alder Flats and Winfield
076560	Ponoka Co. near Rimbey Bluffton and Hoadley
076570	Ponoka Co. near Crestomere
076611	Leduc Co. near Leduc Beaumont and Kavanagh
076612	Leduc Co. near New Sarepta and Rolly View
076620	Co. of Wetaskiwin near Wetaskiwin Millet and Hwy 2
076630	Strathcona Co. near Ardrossan and Cooking Lake
076641	Beaver Co. near Tofield
076642	Beaver Co. near Holden and Ryley
076651	Camrose Co. near Hay Lakes and Miquelon Lake Prov. Park
076652	Camrose Co. near Camrose and Bittern Lake
076653	Camrose Co. near New Norway Edberg and Ferintosh
076654	Camrose Co. near Bawlf and Rosalind
076660	Flagstaff Co. near Daysland Heisler and Strome
077111	Co. of Grande Prairie near Beaverlodge Hythe and Demmitt
077112	Co. of Grande Prairie near Sexsmith and La Glace
077113	Co. of Grande Prairie near Grande Prairie and Wembley
077121	M.D. of Greenview near Wapiti and Shuttler Flats Rec. Area
077122	M.D. of Greenview near O'Brien Prov. Park and Big Mtn Creek
077123	M.D. of Greenview near DeBolt
077124	M.D. of Greenview near Little Smoky
077125	M.D. of Greenview near Sturgeon Lake
077126	M.D. of Greenview near Valleyview and New Fish Creek
077210	M.D. of Greenview near Grande Cache Botten and Amundson
077220	M.D. of Greenview near Kakwa Wildland Prov. Park and Nose Lake
077230	Yellowhead Co. near William A. Switzer Prov. Park
077240	Yellowhead Co. near Big Berland and the Wildhay River
077250	Willmore Wilderness Park
077260	Yellowhead Co. near Hinton and Obed Lake Prov. Park
077311	Big Lakes County near Enilda and Joussard
077312	Big Lakes County near Hilliard's Bay Prov. Park and Big Point
077313	Big Lakes County near Driftpile Faust and Kinuso
077321	M.D. of Lesser Slave River near Slave Lake and Saulteaux
077322	M.D. of Lesser Slave River near Marten Beach
077323	M.D. of Lesser Slave River near Smith and Fawcett Lake
077330	M.D. of Opportunity near Calling and Rock Island Lakes
077340	Athabasca Co. near Wandering River
077410	M.D. of Greenview near Fox Creek
077421	Yellowhead Co. near Edson and Sundance Prov. Park
077422	Yellowhead Co. near Peers and Niton Junction
077431	Woodlands Co. near Benbow and Windfall
077432	Woodlands Co. near Carson-Pegasus Prov. Park
077433	Woodlands Co. near Goose Lake
077434	Woodlands Co. near Whitecourt and Blue Ridge
077440	Big Lakes County near Swan Hills
078111	Mackenzie Co. near Bistcho Lake
078112	Mackenzie Co. near Rainbow Lake Zama Lake and Chateh
078113	Mackenzie Co. near Zama City
078114	Mackenzie Co. near Indian Cabins and Steen River
078115	Mackenzie Co. near Meander River and Lutose
078116	Mackenzie Co. near High Level and Bushe River Res.
078120	Co. of Northern Lights near Paddle Prairie Smt
078131	Mackenzie Co. near the Caribou Mountains
078132	Mackenzie Co. near Fort Vermilion
078133	Mackenzie Co. near John D'or Prairie and Fox Lake
078134	Mackenzie Co. near La Crête and Buffalo Head Prairie
078135	Mackenzie Co. near the Tallcree and Wadlin Lake Reserves
078211	Clear Hills Co. near Chinchaga Wildland Prov. Park
078212	Clear Hills Co. near Cleardale Worsley and Cherry Point
078213	Clear Hills Co. near Hines Creek and Eureka River
078221	Saddle Hills Co. near Bay Tree and Silver Valley
078222	Saddle Hills Co. near Moonshine Lake Prov. Park
078223	Saddle Hills Co. near Woking
078231	M.D. of Spirit River including Spirit River and Rycroft
078232	M.D. of Fairview including Fairview Whitelaw and Dunvegan
078233	M.D. of Peace including Grimshaw and Berwyn
078241	Co. of Northern Lights near Manning and Notikewin Prov. Park
078242	Co. of Northern Lights near Dixonville and Cardinal Lake
078251	Birch Hills Co. near Wanham and Peoria
078252	Birch Hills Co. near Eaglesham and Hwy 740
078261	Nrn Sunrise Co. near Keppler Creek
078262	Nrn Sunrise Co. near Peace River Nampa and Three Creeks
078270	M.D. of Smoky River including Falher McLennan and Guy
078280	Big Lakes County near High Prairie and Winagami Lake
078311	Nrn Sunrise Co. near Loon Prairie Res. and Bison Lake
078312	Nrn Sunrise Co. near Cadotte Lake and Swampy Lake Res.
078313	Nrn Sunrise Co. near Utikoomak Reserves
078320	Big Lakes County near Gift Lake and Peavine Smts
078331	M.D. of Opportunity near Peerless Lake and Trout Lake
078332	M.D. of Opportunity near Red Earth Creek and Loon Lake
078333	M.D. of Opportunity near Wabasca-Desmarais and Sandy Lake
078334	M.D. of Opportunity near Chipewyan Lake
079111	Wood Buffalo Nat. Park west of the Fifth Meridian
079112	Wood Buffalo Nat. Park near Hay Camp and Ninishith Hills
079113	Wood Buffalo Nat. Park near Garden River and Thebacha Trail
079114	Wood Buffalo Nat. Park near Peace Point and Lake Claire
079121	R.M. of Wood Buffalo near Namur River and Namur Lake Reserves
079122	R.M. of Wood Buffalo near Clausen's Landing and Chipewyan 201FG
079123	R.M. of Wood Buffalo near Old Fort Chipewyan 201and 201ABCDE
079131	R.M. of Wood Buffalo near Fitzgerald and La Butte Creek
079132	R.M. of Wood Buffalo near Colin-Cornwall Lakes Prov. Park
079133	R.M. of Wood Buffalo near Fort Chipewyan and Sand Point
079210	R.M. of Wood Buffalo near Fort MacKay and Wallace Creek
079221	R.M. of Wood Buffalo near Fort McMurray and Anzac
079222	R.M. of Wood Buffalo near Gipsy Lake and Whitemud Falls
079223	R.M. of Wood Buffalo near Grand Rapids Wildland Prov. Park
079231	R.M. of Wood Buffalo near Mariana Lake
079232	R.M. of Wood Buffalo near Stony Mtn Prov. Park and Engstrom Lake
079241	Lac La Biche Co. near Crow Lake Prov. Park
079242	Lac La Biche Co. near Wiau Winefred and Grist Lakes
079243	R.M. of Wood Buffalo near Janvier South and Conklin

British Columbia
CLC	Region
081100	Haida Gwaii
081200	North Vancouver Island
081310	East Vancouver Island - Duncan to Nanaimo
081320	East Vancouver Island - Nanoose Bay to Fanny Bay
081330	East Vancouver Island - Courtenay to Campbell River
081400	West Vancouver Island
081500	Inland Vancouver Island
081600	Greater Victoria
082100	Central Coast - coastal sections
082200	Central Coast - inland sections
082310	Sunshine Coast - Gibsons to Earls Cove
082320	Sunshine Coast - Saltery Bay to Powell River
082400	Whistler
082511; 082514; 082520	Howe Sound (non-specific codes)
082512; 082610	Metro Vancouver - North Shore including West Vancouver and North Vancouver (non-specific codes)
082513; 082630; 082711; 082714	Metro Vancouver - northeast including Coquitlam and Maple Ridge (non-specific codes)
082620	Metro Vancouver - central including the City of Vancouver Burnaby and New Westminster
082640; 082713	Metro Vancouver - southeast including Surrey and Langley (non-specific codes)
082650	Metro Vancouver - southwest including Richmond and Delta
082711; 082712	Fraser Valley - west including Abbotsford (non-specific codes)
082721; 082722	Fraser Valley - central including Chilliwack (non-specific codes)
082723; 082730	Fraser Valley - east including Hope (non-specific codes)
082723; 083410	Manning - Skagit Valley (non-specific codes)
082800	Southern Gulf Islands
083110	Fraser Canyon - north including Lillooet
083121; 083300	Nicola (non-specific codes)
083122	Fraser Canyon - south including Lytton
083200	South Thompson
083420	Similkameen
083510	North Okanagan - including Vernon
083520	Central Okanagan - including Kelowna
083530	South Okanagan - including Penticton
083600	Shuswap
084100	Arrow Lakes - Slocan Lake
084200	Boundary
084300	West Kootenay
084400	Kootenay Lake
084510	East Kootenay - south including Cranbrook
084520	East Kootenay - north including Invermere
084600	Elk Valley
085100	North Thompson
085200	North Columbia
085300	Kinbasket
085400	West Columbia
085500	East Columbia
085600	Yoho Park - Kootenay Park
086100	Chilcotin
086210	Cariboo - north including Quesnel
086220	Cariboo - south including Williams Lake
086300	100Mile
086400	Yellowhead
087110	Bulkley Valley
087120	Lakes District
087200	Williston
087310	B.C. South Peace River
087320	B.C. North Peace River
087410	Stuart - Nechako
087420	Prince George
087500	McGregor
088100	Fort Nelson
088200	Muncho Lake Park - Stone Mountain Park
088300	Watson Lake
089100	North Coast - coastal sections
089210	North Coast - inland including Terrace
089220	North Coast - inland including Kitimat
089230	North Coast - inland including Stewart
089300	Dease Lake
089400	Cassiar Mountains
089500	Teslin
089600	Atlin

Yukon
CLC	Region
091100	Dawson
091200	Mayo
091300	Beaver Creek
091400	Pelly - Carmacks
091500	Kluane Lake
091600	Haines Junction
091700	Whitehorse
092100	Teslin - YT
092200	Cassiar Mountains - YT
092300	Watson Lake - YT
092400	Faro - Ross River
093100	Dempster
093200	Old Crow

Northwest Territories
CLC	Region
094200	Ft. Liard Region including Nahanni Butte - Sambaa K'e
094300	Ft. Simpson Region including Jean Marie River
094400	Wrigley Region
094500	Norman Wells - Tulita Region
094600	Fort Good Hope Region
094710	Deline
094720	Colville Lake
095200	Ft. Providence Region including Kakisa - Chan Lake
095310	Yellowknife Region
095320	North Slave Region including Wekweeti - Whati - Behchoko
095400	Hay River Region including Enterprise
095500	Thebacha Region including Ft. Smith - Salt River Reserve
095600	Ft. Resolution Region including Hwy. 6
095700	Lutsel K'e Region
096210	Sachs Harbour
096310	Ulukhaktok
096420	Paulatuk
096520	Tuktoyaktuk - East Channel Region
096530	Aklavik Region
096540	Inuvik Region
096550	South Delta Region including Ft. McPherson - Tsiigehtchic

Nunavut
CLC	Region
097110	Cambridge Bay
097210	Kugluktuk
097310	Taloyoak
097410	Gjoa Haven
097420	Kugaaruk
097510	Baker Lake
097610	Arviat
097620	Rankin Region including Whale Cove
097630	Chesterfield Inlet
097710	Hall Beach
097720	Igloolik
097730	Naujaat
097810	Coral Harbour
097910	Sanikiluaq
098110	Arctic Bay
098120	Pond Inlet
098130	Clyde River
098210	Qikiqtarjuaq
098220	Pangnirtung
098230	Iqaluit
098240	Kimmirut
098250	Kinngait
099110	Resolute
099210	Grise Fjord

=== List of marine forecast regions ===
If viewing this page online, each marine forecast region entry is linked to a page on the MSC's website with the marine forecast and any warnings in effect for that region.

Pacific waters
CLC	Region	Sub-regions
001110	Juan de Fuca Strait	3 sub-regions: 001111 / East entrance; 001112 / Central Strait; 001113 / West entrance
001120	Haro Strait	None
001130	Strait of Georgia	2 sub-regions: 001131 / North of Nanaimo; 001132 / South of Nanaimo
001140	Howe Sound	None
001150	Johnstone Strait	None
001160	Queen Charlotte Strait	None
001170	West Coast Vancouver Island North	None
001180	West Coast Vancouver Island South	None
001210	Queen Charlotte Sound	4 sub-regions: 001211 / Northeast quadrant; 001212 / Southeast quadrant; 001213 / Southwest quadrant; 001214 / Northwest quadrant
001220	Central Coast from McInnes Island to Pine Island	None
001230	Douglas Channel	None
001240	Hecate Strait	2 sub-regions: 001241 / Northern half; 001242 / Southern half
001250	Dixon Entrance East	None
001260	Dixon Entrance West	2 sub-regions: 001261 / East of Langara; 001262 / West of Langara
001270	West Coast Haida Gwaii	2 sub-regions: 001271 / Northern half; 001272 / Southern half
001310	Bowie	2 sub-regions: 001311 / Northern half; 001312 / Southern half
001320	Explorer	2 sub-regions: 001321 / Northwestern half; 001322 / Southeastern half

Great Lakes
CLC	Region	Sub-regions
002210	Lake Erie	2 sub-regions: 002211 / Eastern part; 002212 / Western part
002310	Lake St. Clair	None
002410	Lake Huron (Main basin)	2 sub-regions: 002411 / Northern part; 002412 / Southern part
002510	Georgian Bay	2 sub-regions: 002511 / Northern part; 002512 / Southern part
002610	North Channel	None
002710	Whitefish Bay	None
002810	Lake Superior	2 sub-regions: 002811 / Eastern part; 002812 / Western part
002910	Lake Ontario	2 sub-regions: 002911 / Eastern part; 002912 / Western part

Atlantic waters
CLC	Region	Sub-regions
003110	Tadoussac to Pointe-des-Monts	2 sub-regions: 003111 / Pointe à Michel to Pointe-des-Monts; 003112 / Tadoussac to Pointe à Michel
003120	Pointe-des-Monts to Anticosti	2 sub-regions: 003121 / Northern half; 003122 / Southern half
003140	Waters surrounding Anticosti Island	8 sub-regions: 003141 / Northern sector; 003142 / Northeast sector; 003143 / Far east sector; 003144 / Southeast sector; 003145 / Southern sector; 003146 / Southwest sector; 003147 / Far west sector; 003148 / Northwest sector
003150	Chaleur-Miscou	2 sub-regions: 003151 / Eastern half; 003152 / Western half
003160	Waters surrounding Magdalen Islands	8 sub-regions: 003161 / North to northeast; 003162 / Northeast to east; 003163 / East to southeast; 003164 / Southeast to south; 003165 / South to southwest; 003166 / Southwest to west; 003167 / West to northwest; 003168 / Northwest to north
003170	Northumberland Strait	2 sub-regions: 003171 / Eastern half; 003172 / Western half
003210	Bay of Fundy	None
003220	Grand Manan	None
003230	Lurcher	2 sub-regions: 003231 / Eastern half; 003232 / Western half
003240	Browns Bank	2 sub-regions: 003241 / Eastern half; 003242 / Western half
003250	Georges Bank	2 sub-regions: 003251 / Northern half; 003252 / Southern half
003260	Southwestern Shore of Nova Scotia	2 sub-regions: 003261 / Eastern half; 003262 / Western half
003270	LaHave Bank	2 sub-regions: 003271 / Eastern half; 003272 / Western half
003280	West Scotian Slope	8 sub-regions: 003281 / North to northeast; 003282 / Northeast to east; 003283 / East to southeast; 003284 / Southeast to south; 003285 / South to southwest; 003286 / Southwest to west; 003287 / West to northwest; 003288 / Northwest to north
003290	Halifax Harbour and Approaches	None
003310	Cabot Strait	2 sub-regions: 003311 / Northern half; 003312 / Southern half
003320	Fourchu	2 sub-regions: 003321 / Eastern half; 003322 / Western half
003330	Eastern Shore of Nova Scotia	2 sub-regions: 003331 / Eastern half; 003332 / Western half
003340	Sable	2 sub-regions: 003341 / Eastern half; 003342 / Western half
003350	East Scotian Slope	8 sub-regions: 003351 / North to northeast; 003352 / Northeast to east; 003353 / East to southeast; 003354 / Southeast to south; 003355 / South to southwest; 003356 / Southwest to west; 003357 / West to northwest; 003358 / Northwest to north
003360	Southwest Coast of Newfoundland	2 sub-regions: 003361 / Ramea and east; 003362 / West of Ramea
003370	Banquereau	8 sub-regions: 003371 / North to northeast; 003372 / Northeast to east; 003373 / East to southeast; 003374 / Southeast to south; 003375 / South to southwest; 003376 / Southwest to west; 003377 / West to northwest; 003378 / Northwest to north
003380	Laurentian Fan	8 sub-regions: 003381 / North to northeast; 003382 / Northeast to east; 003383 / East to southeast; 003384 / Southeast to south; 003385 / South to southwest; 003386 / Southwest to west; 003387 / West to northwest; 003388 / Northwest to north
003410	Strait of Belle Isle	2 sub-regions: 003411 / Eastern half; 003412 / Western half
003420	Northeast Gulf of St. Lawrence	2 sub-regions: 003421 / Northeastern half; 003422 / Southwestern half
003430	Gulf - Port au Port	2 sub-regions: 003431 / Northeastern half; 003432 / Southwestern half
003440	Northeast Coast of Newfoundland	2 sub-regions: 003441 / North of Cape St. John; 003442 / Cape St. John and south
003450	East Coast of Newfoundland	2 sub-regions: 003451 / North of Cape St. Francis; 003452 / Cape St. Francis and south
003460	South Coast of Newfoundland	2 sub-regions: 003461 / Cape St. Mary's and east; 003462 / West of Cape St. Mary's
003470	Southwestern Grand Banks	8 sub-regions: 003471 / North to northeast; 003472 / Northeast to east; 003473 / East to southeast; 003474 / Southeast to south; 003475 / South to southwest; 003476 / Southwest to west; 003477 / West to northwest; 003478 / Northwest to north
003510	South Labrador Coast	2 sub-regions: 003511 / Porters Head and north; 003512 / South of Porters Head
003520	Belle Isle Bank	8 sub-regions: 003521 / North to northeast; 003522 / Northeast to east; 003523 / East to southeast; 003524 / Southeast to south; 003525 / South to southwest; 003526 / Southwest to west; 003527 / West to northwest; 003528 / Northwest to north
003530	Funk Island Bank	8 sub-regions: 003531 / North to northeast; 003532 / Northeast to east; 003533 / East to southeast; 003534 / Southeast to south; 003535 / South to southwest; 003536 / Southwest to west; 003537 / West to northwest; 003538 / Northwest to north
003540	Northern Grand Banks	8 sub-regions: 003541 / North to northeast; 003542 / Northeast to east; 003543 / East to southeast; 003544 / Southeast to south; 003545 / South to southwest; 003546 / Southwest to west; 003547 / West to northwest; 003548 / Northwest to north
003550	Southeastern Grand Banks	8 sub-regions: 003551 / North to northeast; 003552 / Northeast to east; 003553 / East to southeast; 003554 / Southeast to south; 003555 / South to southwest; 003556 / Southwest to west; 003557 / West to northwest; 003558 / Northwest to north
003610	North Labrador Coast	2 sub-regions: 003611 / North of Saglek; 003612 / Saglek and south
003620	Mid-Labrador Coast	2 sub-regions: 003621 / North of Hopedale; 003622 / Hopedale and south
003630	Northwest Labrador Sea	8 sub-regions: 003631 / North to northeast; 003632 / Northeast to east; 003633 / East to southeast; 003634 / Southeast to south; 003635 / South to southwest; 003636 / Southwest to west; 003637 / West to northwest; 003638 / Northwest to north
003640	South Labrador Sea	8 sub-regions: 003641 / North to northeast; 003642 / Northeast to east; 003643 / East to southeast; 003644 / Southeast to south; 003645 / South to southwest; 003646 / Southwest to west; 003647 / West to northwest; 003648 / Northwest to north
003650	East Labrador Sea	8 sub-regions: 003651 / North to northeast; 003652 / Northeast to east; 003653 / East to southeast; 003654 / Southeast to south; 003655 / South to southwest; 003656 / Southwest to west; 003657 / West to northwest; 003658 / Northwest to north

St. Lawrence River and eastern inland waters
CLC	Region	Sub-regions
004110	Lake Melville	None
004210	Bras d'Or Lakes	None
004310	Saguenay River	None
004320	Lac Saint-Jean	None
004410	L'Isle-aux-Coudres to Tadoussac	None
004420	Donnacona to L'Isle-aux-Coudres	2 sub-regions: 004421 / Beauport to L'Isle-aux-Coudres; 004422 / Donnacona to Beauport
004430	Trois-Rivières to Donnacona	None
004440	Montréal to Trois-Rivières	None
004450	Cornwall to Montréal	None
004461	Prescott to Cornwall	None
004471	Kingston to Prescott	None
004510	North Lake Memphremagog	None
004610	Richelieu River and North Lake Champlain	None
004710	Lake Simcoe	None
004720	Lake Nipissing	None
004810	Lake Nipigon	None
004820	Lake of the Woods	None

Hudson Bay and Baffin Island waters
CLC	Region	Sub-regions
005110	Prince Charles	None
005120	East Foxe	None
005130	West Foxe	None
005140	Igloolik	2 sub-regions: 005141 / Northern half; 005142 / Southern half
005210	Nottingham	2 sub-regions: 005211 / Eastern half; 005212 / Western half
005220	Resolution (Central Hudson Strait)	2 sub-regions: 005221 / Eastern half; 005222 / Western half
005230	Ungava	2 sub-regions: 005231 / Eastern half; 005232 / Western half
005310	Puvirnituq	2 sub-regions: 005311 / Northern half; 005312 / Southern half
005320	Belcher	2 sub-regions: 005321 / Northern half; 005322 / Southern half
005330	James Bay	2 sub-regions: 005331 / Northern half; 005332 / Southern half
005410	South central Hudson Bay	2 sub-regions: 005411 / Eastern half; 005412 / Western half
005420	South Hudson Bay	2 sub-regions: 005421 / Eastern half; 005422 / Western half
005430	York	2 sub-regions: 005431 / Eastern half; 005432 / Western half
005510	Arviat	2 sub-regions: 005511 / Eastern half; 005512 / Western half
005520	Churchill	2 sub-regions: 005521 / Eastern half; 005522 / Western half
005530	Central Hudson Bay	2 sub-regions: 005531 / Eastern half; 005532 / Western half
005540	Coats	2 sub-regions: 005541 / Northern half; 005542 / Southern half
005610	Roes Welcome	2 sub-regions: 005611 / Northern half; 005612 / Southern half
005620	Rankin	2 sub-regions: 005621 / Northern half; 005622 / Southern half

Northeastern Arctic waters (Canadian Arctic islands)
CLC	Region	Sub-regions
006110	Robeson	2 sub-regions: 006111 / Northern half; 006112 / Southern half
006120	Kane	2 sub-regions: 006121 / Northern half; 006122 / Southern half
006130	Clarence	2 sub-regions: 006131, 006132 / Northern half; 006133~; 006135 / Southern half
006140	East Baffin (North of 72°N)	2 sub-regions: 006141, 006142 / Northern half; 006143, 006144 / Southern half
006150	East Clyde	2 sub-regions: 006151, 006152 / Northern half; 006153, 006154 / Southern half
006160	West Clyde	2 sub-regions: 006161 / Northern half; 006162 / Southern half
006170	West Baffin (North of 72°N)	2 sub-regions: 006171 / Northern half; 006172 / Southern half
006180	Pond	None
006210	East Davis	2 sub-regions: 006211~; 006213 / Northern half; 006214, 006215 / Southern half
006220	East Brevoort	2 sub-regions: 006221 / Northern half; 006222 / Southern half
006230	Central Brevoort	2 sub-regions: 006231 / Northern half; 006232 / Southern half
006240	West Brevoort	2 sub-regions: 006241 / Northern half; 006242 / Southern half
006250	Frobisher Bay	None
006260	Cumberland Sound	None
006270	West Davis	2 sub-regions: 006271 / Northern half; 006272 / Southern half
006310	Lancaster	2 sub-regions: 006311 / Eastern half; 006312 / Western half
006320	Navy Board	None
006330	Admiralty	None
006340	Committee	None
006350	Boothia	None
006360	Regent	2 sub-regions: 006361 / Northern half; 006362 / Southern half
006410	Barrow	2 sub-regions: 006411 / Eastern half; 006412 / Western half
006420	Peel	2 sub-regions: 006421 / Northern half; 006422 / Southern half
006430	St. Roch	2 sub-regions: 006431 / Northern half; 006432 / Southern half
006440	Maud	None
006450	Larsen	None
006460	McClintock	None
006510	Dease	None
006520	Bathurst	None
006530	Coronation	None
006540	Dolphin	None
006550	Amundsen	2 sub-regions: 006551, 006552 / Eastern half; 006553 / Western half
006560	Holman	None
006570	Prince of Wales	None
006610	Rae (between Barrow and Melville)	None
006620	Melville	None
006630	McClure	None
006640	Liddon	None
006650	Fitzwilliam	None
006660	Griper	None
006670	Ballantyne	None
006680	Wilkins	None
006710	Peary	None
006720	Hassel	None
006730	MacLean	None
006740	Queens	None
006750	Byam	None
006760	Hazen	None
006770	Gustaf	None
006810	Greely	None
006820	Eureka	2 sub-regions: 006821 / Northern half; 006822 / Southern half
006830	Jones	2 sub-regions: 006831 / Eastern half; 006832 / Western half
006840	Norwegian	None
006850	Massey	None
006860	South Sverdrup	None
006870	North Sverdrup	None
006880	Nansen	None

Western Arctic waters
CLC	Region	Sub-regions
007110	88.5°N to North Pole (CZ1)	None
007120	87~88.5°N, 35~80°W (CY3)	None
007130	85~87°N, 35~60°W (CX5)	None
007140	85~87°N, 60~90°W (CX4)	None
007150	85~87°N, 90~120°W (CX3)	None
007160	85~87°N, 120~141°W (CX2)	None
007170	85~87°N, 141~169°W (CX1, NAVAREA XVII)	None
007180	87~88.5°N, 120~169°W (CY1, NAVAREA XVII)	None
007190	87~88.5°N, 80~120°W (CY2)	None
007210	International waters south of 85°N, 35~60°W (CW6, NAVAREA XVIII)	None
007220	North Greenland coast, 35~55°W (CV7, NAVAREA XVIII)	None
007230	Robeson Channel entrance to Lincoln Sea (CV6)	None
007310	84~85°N, 60~80°W (CW5)	None
007320	Alert	None
007330	Bartlett (James Ross Bay to Cape Columbia)	None
007340	Ward Hunt	None
007350	Ellesmere (West of Ward Hunt to 90°W)	None
007360	South Axel Heiberg	None
007370	Axel Heiberg	None
007380	83~85°N, 80~100°W, except where part of Ellesmere area (CW4)	None
007410	Prince Patrick	None
007420	Brock	None
007430	South Prince Patrick	None
007440	75~76.5°N, 130~141°W (CT4)	None
007450	76.5~78°N, 130~141°W (CU4)	None
007460	78~79.5°N, 130~141°W (CU3)	None
007510	82~85°N, 100~120°W (CW3)	None
007520	79.5~82°N, 110~120°W (CV5)	None
007530	Ellef Ringnes	None
007540	South Ellef Ringnes	None
007550	Borden	None
007560	North Prince Patrick	None
007570	79.5~82°N, 120~130°W (CV4)	None
007580	79.5~82°N, 130~141°W (CV3)	None
007590	82~85°N, 120~141°W (CW2)	None
007610	82~85°N, 141~169°W (CW1, NAVAREA XVII)	None
007620	79.5~82°N, 141~155°W (CV2, NAVAREA XVII)	None
007630	76.5~79.5°N, 141~155°W (CU2, NAVAREA XVII)	None
007640	International waters south of 76.5°N, 141~151.5°W (CT3, NAVAREA XVII)	None
007650	International waters south of 76.5°N, 151.5~160°W (CT2, NAVAREA XVII)	None
007660	International waters south of 76.5°N, 160~169°W (CT1, NAVAREA XVII)	None
007670	76.5~79.5°N, 155~169°W (CU1, NAVAREA XVII)	None
007680	79.5~82°N, 155~169°W (CV1, NAVAREA XVII)	None
007710	Prince Alfred	None
007720	Banks	None
007730	Baillie	2 sub-regions: 007731 / Eastern half; 007732 / Western half
007810	West Prince Alfred	None
007820	North Tuktoyaktuk	None
007830	Tuktoyaktuk	2 sub-regions: 007831 / Eastern half; 007832 / Western half
007840	Yukon Coast	None
007850	MacKenzie	None
007860	North MacKenzie	None
007870	Northwest Beaufort	None

Western inland waters
CLC	Region	Sub-regions
008110	Mackenzie River	6 sub-regions: 008111 / Wrigley Harbour to Axe Point; 008112 / Axe Point to Camsell Bend; 008113 / Camsell Bend to Tulita; 008114 / Tulita to Fort Good Hope; 008115 / Fort Good Hope to Point Separation; 008116 / Point Separation to Kittigazuit Bay
008310	Great Slave Lake	3 sub-regions: 008311 / North Arm; 008312 / East Arm; 008313 / Main Basin
008320	Baker Lake	None
008410	Lake Athabasca	2 sub-regions: 008411 / Eastern half; 008412, 008413 / Western half
008620	Lake Winnipegosis	None
008630	Lake Winnipeg	2 sub-regions: 008631 / North basin; 008632 / South basin
008640	Lake Manitoba	None

=== List of air quality monitoring stations ===
==== Maritimes ====
CLC	Station
010001	Halifax
010002	Sydney
010003	Charlottetown
010004	Moncton
010005	Fredericton
010006	Saint John
010007	Kentville
010009	Summerside (Wellington)
010010	St. Peters Bay
010011	Pictou
010012	Port Hawkesbury
010013	Edmundston
010014	Campbellton
010015	Miramichi
010027	Bathurst
010028	Halifax Downtown
010029	Lake Major
010030	Saint Andrews

==== Newfoundland and Labrador ====
CLC	Station
020001	St. John's
020003	Corner Brook
020004	Grand Falls-Windsor
020012	Labrador City
020018	Burin

==== Quebec ====
CLC	Station
030001	Montreal
030002	Quebec City
030003	Gatineau

==== Ontario ====
CLC	Station
040001	Toronto
040002	Ottawa
040003	Burlington
040004	Oakville
040005	Mississauga
040006	Brampton
040007	Newmarket
040008	Oshawa
040010	Hamilton
040012	Sault Ste. Marie
040013	Peterborough
040014	London
040015	Kingston
040016	Toronto East
040017	Toronto North
040018	Toronto Downtown
040019	Toronto West
040022	Hamilton Downtown
040023	Hamilton Mountain
040024	Thunder Bay
040025	North Bay
040026	Windsor downtown
040027	Windsor West
040028	Chatham
040029	Sarnia
040030	Grand Bend
040031	Port Stanley
040032	Tiverton
040033	Brantford
040034	Kitchener
040035	St. Catharines
040036	Guelph
040037	Hamilton West
040039	Barrie
040040	Parry Sound
040041	Dorset
040045	Belleville
040046	Morrisburg
040047	Cornwall
040068	Sudbury

==== Manitoba ====
CLC	Station
050001	Winnipeg
050002	Brandon
050003	Flin Flon

==== Saskatchewan ====
CLC	Station
060001	Regina
060002	Saskatoon
060003	Prince Albert
060004	Swift Current
060006	Buffalo Narrows

==== Alberta ====
CLC	Station
070001	Calgary
070002	Edmonton
070003	Red Deer
070004	Fort McMurray
070005	Fort McKay
070006	Lethbridge
070008	Fort Saskatchewan
070011	Cold Lake
070013	Medicine Hat
070015	Grande Prairie
070018	Genesee
070019	Fort Chipewyan
070020	Drayton Valley
070022	Airdrie
070023	St. Albert
070024	Sturgeon County
070028	Lamont County
070029	Strathcona County
070030	Wood Buffalo - south
070031	Hinton
070032	Edson

==== British Columbia ====
CLC	Station
080004	Kamloops
080005	Prince George
080006	Victoria/Saanich
080007	Nanaimo
080010	Quesnel
080011	Whistler
080012	Williams Lake
080013	West Shore
080014	Duncan
080015	Comox Valley
080016	Campbell River
080017	Haines Road - Yukon border to Pleasant Camp
080019	South Klondike Highway - Yukon border to White Pass
080022	Squamish
080024	Castlegar
080025	Cranbrook
080046	Fort St. John
080047	Terrace
080048	Vanderhoof
080049	Smithers
080050	Kitimat
080052	Sparwood

==== Territories ====
CLC	Station
090003	Yellowknife
090004	Inuvik
090005	Iqaluit
090006	Whitehorse
090007	Fort Smith
090008	Arviat
090009	Kugluktuk
090010	Norman Wells
090154	Fort Simpson

=== List of coastal and inland lacustrine flood warning regions ===
==== Maritimes ====
CLC	Region
010031	Coastline of Campbellton and eastern half of Restigouche County
010032	Coastline of Bathurst and Chaleur Region
010034	Coastline of Miramichi and area
010035	Coastline of Kent County and Kouchibouguac National Park
010036	Northumberland Strait Shoreline: Westmorland County
010037	Coastline of Fundy National Park
010038	Coastline of Saint John County
010039	Coastline of Charlotte County and Grand Manan Island
010040	Northern Coastline of Prince County
010041	Southern Coastline of Prince County
010042	Northern Coastline of Queens County
010043	Southern Coastline of Queens County
010044	Northern Coastline of Kings County
010045	Southern Coastline of Kings County
010046	Coastline of Inverness County - South of Mabou
010047	Coastline of Inverness County - Mabou and North
010048	Coastline of Victoria County
010049	Coastline of Sydney Metro and Cape Breton County
010050	Coastline of Richmond County
010052	Coastline of Halifax County - east of Porters Lake
010053	Coastline of Halifax Metro and Halifax County West
010054	Coastline of Lunenburg County
010055	Coastline of Queens County
010056	Coastline of Shelburne County
010057	Coastline of Yarmouth County
010058	Coastline of Digby County
010059	Coastline of Annapolis County
010060	Coastline of Kings County
010061	Coastline of Colchester County - Cobequid Bay
010062	Coastline of Cumberland County - Minas Shore
010063	Coastline of Cumberland County North
010064	Coastline of Colchester County North
010065	Coastline of Pictou County
010066	Coastline of Antigonish County
010078	Coastline of Guysborough County
010079	Coastline of Colchester County - Truro and South
010080	Coastline of Hants County
010081	Chignecto Bay Shoreline: Albert and Westmorland Counties
010082	Moncton and vicinity
010083	Acadian Peninsula: Gulf of St Lawrence Shoreline
010084	Acadian Peninsula: Chaleur Bay Shoreline

==== Newfoundland and Labrador ====
CLC	Region
020030	Labrador Shoreline of the Strait of Belle Isle
020031	Labrador Coastline: Norman Bay - Lodge Bay
020034	Labrador Coastline north of Nain
020044	Newfoundland Coastline: Northern Peninsula East
020045	Newfoundland Coastline: White Bay - Baie Verte - La Scie
020046	Newfoundland Coastline: Green Bay
020047	Newfoundland Coastline: Bay of Exploits
020048	Newfoundland Coastline: Gander Bay to Lumsden
020049	Northern and Western Shorelines of Bonavista Bay
020050	Southern Shoreline of Bonavista Bay
020051	Northern Shoreline of Trinity Bay
020052	Western Shoreline of Trinity Bay including Random Island
020053	Southern Shoreline of Trinity Bay
020054	Eastern Shoreline of Trinity Bay
020055	Western Shoreline of Conception Bay
020056	Southern and Eastern Shorelines of Conception Bay including Bell Island
020057	Eastern Coastline of the Avalon Peninsula
020058	Southern Coastline of the Avalon Peninsula
020059	Eastern and Northern Shorelines of Placentia Bay including Ragged Islands
020060	Western Shoreline of Placentia Bay
020061	Southern Coastline of the Burin Peninsula
020062	Western Coastline of the Burin Peninsula
020063	Newfoundland Coastline: Connaigre
020064	Newfoundland Coastline: Burgeo - Ramea - Grey River - Francois
020065	Newfoundland Coastline: Isle aux Morts - La Poile
020066	Newfoundland Coastline: Cape Ray - Channel-Port aux Basques
020067	Newfoundland Coastline: Wreckhouse to Cape Anguille
020068	Newfoundland Coastline: Bay St. George - Port au Port
020069	Shoreline of the Bay of Islands
020070	Newfoundland Coastline: Bonne Bay - St. Paul's - Cow Head
020071	Newfoundland Coastline: Parson's Pond to Barr'd Harbour
020072	Newfoundland Shoreline of the Strait of Belle Isle
020073	Labrador Coastline: Cartwright - Black Tickle
020074	Labrador Coastline: Rigolet - Hamilton Inlet
020075	Labrador Coastline: Postville - Makkovik
020076	Labrador Coastline: Hopedale and vicinity
020077	Labrador Coastline: Nain to Natuashish

==== Quebec ====
CLC	Region
030007	Coastline from Leaf River to Aupaluk
030008	Coastline from Aupaluk to Siijaapiit
030009	Coastline from Siijaapiit to Arqusiugaq
030010	Coastline from Ipuitaq to Charles Island
030011	Coastline from Charles Island to Digges Islands
030012	Coastline from Qairtuinaq to Umiujaq
030013	Coastline from Baie de Saint-Charles to Aguanish
030014	Coastline from Pointe-des-Monts to Gallix
030015	Coastline from Pessamit to Pointe-des-Monts including Baie-Comeau
030016	Coastline from Les Romaines to Pessamit
030017	Coastline from Grandes-Bergeronnes to Les Romaines
030018	Coastline from Bic to Sainte-Luce including Rimouski
030019	Coastline from Sainte-Luce to Saint-Ulric
030020	Coastline from Saint-Ulric to Capucins including Matane
030021	Coastline from Capucins to Mont-Saint-Pierre
030022	Coastline from Mont-Saint-Pierre to Grand-Étang
030023	Coastline from St-Georges-de-Malbaie to Ste-Thérèse-de-Gaspé including Percé
030024	Coastline from Gascons to Sainte-Thérèse-de-Gaspé
030025	Coastline from Bonaventure to Gascons
030026	Coastline from Miguasha to Bonaventure
030027	Coastline from Broadlands to Miguasha
030028	Coastline of Îles-de-la-Madeleine
030029	Coastline from Les Éboulements to Cap-Tourmente including L'Isle-aux-Coudres
030030	Coastline from Beauport to Cap-Tourmente including Île d'Orléans
030031	Coastline from Cap-Rouge to Beauport including Québec City
030032	Coastline from Cap-Rouge to Le Petit-Village
030033	Coastline from Le Petit-Village to Grondines-Est
030034	Coastline from Grondines-Est to L'Île-Saint-Éloi
030035	Coastline from L'Île-Saint-Éloi to La Petite-Rivière
030036	Coastline from La Petite-Rivière to Le Cul-de-la-Baie
030037	Coastline from Le Cul-de-la-Baie to Lanoraie
030038	Coastline from Lanoraie to Saint-Antoine-Lavaltrie Creek
030039	Coastline from Ruisseau Saint-Antoine-Lavaltrie to Bois-des-Filion
030040	Coastline of Montréal Island
030041	Coastline of Léry to La Prairie
030042	Coastline from Aguanish to Nutashkuan
030043	Coastline of the Waskaganish Region
030044	Coastline from Boatswain Bay to Chisasibi
030045	Coastline from Chisasibi to Long Island
030046	Coastline from Long Island to Kuujjuarapik
030047	Coastline from Kuujjuarapik to Irqatarvik
030048	Coastline from Irqatarvik to Umiujaq
030049	Coastline from George River to Leaf River
030050	Coastline from Arqusiugaq to Quaqtaq
030051	Coastline from Quaqtaq to Ipuitaq
030052	Coastline from Digges Islands to Sitiit Siqinirsiq
030053	Coastline from Sitiit Siqinirsiq to Akulivik
030054	Coastline from Akulivik to Puvirnituq
030055	Coastline from Puvirnituq to Qairtuinaq
030056	Coastline from Baie-Sainte-Claire to Ruisseau-Blanc
030057	Coastline from Ruisseau-Blanc to Heath Point
030058	Coastline from Pointe-Sud to Heath Point
030059	Coastline from Rivière à la Loutre to Pointe-Sud
030060	Coastline from Baie-Sainte-Claire to Rivière à la Loutre
030061	Coastline from Grand-Étang to Forillon National Park
030062	Coastline from Forillon Nat. Park to Saint-Georges-de-Malbaie including Gaspé
030063	Coastline near the City of Saguenay
030064	Shoreline of the Saguenay River
030065	Coastline: Baie-des-Rochers to Grandes-Bergeronnes including Tadoussac
030066	Coastline from Les Éboulements to Baie-des-Rochers
030067	Coastline from Brador to Blanc-Sablon
030068	Coastline from Sainte-Marie Islands to Mutton Bay
030069	Coastline from Mutton Bay to Brador
030070	Coastline: Sheldrake to Baie de Saint-Charles including Havre-Saint-Pierre
030071	Coastline from Gallix to Sheldrake including Sept-Îles
030072	Coastline from Leclercville to Bécancour
030073	Coastline from Leclercville to Saint-Nicolas
030074	Coastline from Saint-Nicolas to Vieux-Lauzon
030075	Coastline from Vieux-Lauzon to Berthier-sur-Mer
030076	Coastline: Berthier-sur-Mer to Saint-Roch-des-Aulnaies including Isle-aux-Grues
030077	Coastline from Saint-Roch-des-Aulnaies to Notre-Dame-du-Portage
030078	Coastline from Notre-Dame-du-Portage to Cacouna
030079	Coastline: Cacouna to Rivière-Trois-Pistoles including Notre-Dame-des-Sept-Douleurs
030080	Coastline from Rivière-Trois-Pistoles to Bic
030081	Coastline from Verchères to Brossard
030082	Coastline from Verchères to Sorel-Tracy
030083	Coastline from Sorel-Tracy to Notre-Dame-de-Pierreville
030084	Coastline from Killiniq to George River
030085	Coastline from Saint-Régis to Maple Grove including Grande Île
030086	Coastline from Pointe-Lalonde to Coteau-du-Lac
030087	Coastline from Coteau-du-Lac to Hudson including Perrot Island
030088	Coastline from Notre-Dame-de-Pierreville to Des Ormeaux
030089	Coastline from Nutashkuan to Sainte-Marie Islands
030091	Coastline: Bois-des-Filion to Terrasse-Bigras including Oka National Park

==== Ontario ====
CLC	Region
040069	Shoreline of the St Lawrence from Brockville to Iroquois
040070	Shoreline of the St Lawrence from Gananoque to Lyn
040071	Shoreline of Lake Ontario from Willowbank to Millers Corner including Kingston
040072	Shoreline of Lake Ontario from Millers Corner to Brighton including Prince Edward
040073	Shoreline of Lake Ontario from Brighton to Wesleyville
040074	Shoreline of Lake Ontario from Wesleyville to West Rouge
040075	Lake Ontario Shoreline: West Rouge - Toronto - Colonel Samuel Smith Park
040076	Lake Ontario Shoreline: Colonel Samuel Smith Park - Charnwood
040077	Lake Ontario Shoreline from Charnwood to Spencer Smith Park
040078	Lake Ontario Shoreline: Spencer Smith Park - Hamilton - Winona Park
040079	Lake Ontario Shoreline: Winona Park to Niagara-on-the-Lake
040080	Shoreline of Lake Erie from Peace Bridge to Long Beach
040081	Shoreline of Lake Erie from Long Beach to Crescent Bay
040082	Lake Erie Shoreline: Crescent Bay - Long Point Wildlife Area - Hemlock
040083	Shoreline of Lake Erie from Hemlock to Port Stanley
040084	Shoreline of Lake Erie from Port Stanley to Port Glasgow
040085	Shoreline of Lake Erie from Port Glasgow to Wheatley
040086	Shoreline of Lake Erie from Wheatley to Amhersburg
040087	Shoreline of Lake Huron from Sarnia to Highland Glen
040088	Shoreline of Lake Huron from Highland Glen to Grand Bend
040089	Shoreline of Lake Huron from Grand Bend to Dunlop
040090	Shoreline of Lake Huron from Dunlop to Point Clark
040091	Shoreline of Lake Huron from Point Clark to Chippawa Hill
040092	Shoreline of Lake Huron from Chippawa Hill to Cove Island
040093	Georgian Bay Shoreline from Cove Island to Centennial Park
040094	Georgian Bay Shoreline from Centennial Park to Collingwood
040095	Georgian Bay Shoreline from Collingwood to Bluewater Beach
040096	Georgian Bay Shoreline: Bluewater Beach - O'Donnell Point Prov. Nature Res.
040097	Georgian Bay Shoreline: O'Donnell Point Prov. Nature Res. - Ojibway Isl.
040098	Georgian Bay Shoreline from Ojibway Island to Key Harbour
040099	Georgian Bay Shoreline from Key Harbour to Little Current
040100	North Channel Shoreline from Bruce Mines to Little Current
040101	Lake Superior Shoreline from Sault Ste. Marie to St. Joseph Island
040102	Northern Coastline of Manitoulin Island
040103	Southern Coastline of Manitoulin Island
040104	Lake Superior Shoreline: Montreal River Harbour - Gros Cap Bluffs
040105	Lake Superior Shoreline: Michipicoten - Montreal River Harbour
040106	Lake Superior Shoreline: Pukaskwa Nat. Park - Michipicoten
040107	Lake Superior Shoreline: Schreiber to Pukaskwa Nat. Park
040108	Shoreline of Lake Superior from Coughlin to Schreiber
040109	Shoreline of Lake Superior from Grand Portage to Coughlin including Thunder Bay
040110	Coastline of the Fort Severn Region
040112	Coastline of the Attawapiskat Region
040113	Coastline of the Fort Albany Region
040114	Coastline of the Moosonee Region
040115	Coastline from Iroquois to Cornwall
040116	Shoreline from Riverside to Amhestburg including Windsor
040117	Shoreline from Riverside to Stoney Point
040118	Shoreline from Jeannettes Creek to Whitebread
040119	Shoreline from Whitebread to Sarnia
040120	Shoreline from Cornwall to Pointe-Lalonde
040121	Shoreline of Lake Nipigon
040122	Shoreline of Lake of the Woods (Ontario)
040123	Coastline of Peawanuck Region to Cape Henrietta Maria
040124	Shoreline of James Bay from Cape Henrietta Maria to Lake River

==== Prairies ====
CLC	Region
050004	Coastline from Churchill to Port Nelson
050005	Coastline from Port Nelson to Ontario-Manitoba Border
050006	Shoreline of Lake of the Woods (Manitoba)
050007	Coastline from Nunalla to Churchill
050008	Shoreline of Lake Manitoba
050009	Shoreline of Lake Winnipeg Northern Basin
050010	Shoreline of Lake Winnipeg Southern Basin
050011	Shoreline of Lake Winnipegosis
060007	Shoreline of Lake Athabasca - Eastern Half (Saskatchewan)
070033	Shoreline of Lake Athabasca - Western Half (Alberta)

==== British Columbia ====
CLC	Region
080053	Western Coastline of Haida Gwaii
080054	Northern Coastline of Haida Gwaii
080055	Eastern Coastline of Haida Gwaii
080056	Coastline from Stewart to Hunts Inlet
080057	Coastline from Hunts Inlet to Farrant Island including Banks Island
080058	Coastline: Prince Inlet - North Bentinck Arm - Margaret Bay
080059	Coastline from Margaret Bay to Cedar Island
080060	Coastline from Health Bay to Harbledown Island
080063	Mainland Coastline - Knight Inlet to Gibsons
080064	Shoreline of Howe Sound
080071	Coastline from Farrant Island to Price Island
080072	Tribune Channel Shoreline
080073	Coastline from Harbledown Island to Hardwicke Island including Knight Inlet
080081	Vancouver Island Coastline: Sayward to Duncan Bay
080082	Vancouver Island Coastline: Campbell River to Oyster River
080083	Vancouver Island Coastline: Oyster River to Royston including Courtenay and Comox
080084	Vancouver Island Coastline: Royston to Lantzville including Parksville
080085	Vancouver Island Coastline: Nanaimo to Saltair
080086	Vancouver Island Coastline: Chemainus to Cowichan Bay
080087	Shoreline of the Strait of Georgia including Tsawwassen
080088	Boundary Bay including Beach Grove
080089	Mud and Semiahmoo Bay: South Surrey - White Rock - Semiahmoo FN
080090	Coastline of Metro Vancouver including Vancouver and Musqueam FN
080091	Coastline of Metro Vancouver including West Vancouver and Bowen Island
080092	Shoreline of Saanich Inlet
080093	Greater Victoria Coastline: Swartz Bay to Cordova Bay
080094	Greater Victoria Coastline: Cordova Bay to East Sooke
080095	Shorelines of the Southern Gulf Islands
080096	Vancouver Island Coastline from Cape Scott to Nootka Sound
080097	Vancouver Island Coastline from Nootka Sound to Barkley Sound including Tofino
080098	Vancouver Island Coastline from Bamfield to Clo-oose
080099	Vancouver Island Coastline from Clo-oose to East Sooke
080100	Vancouver Island Coastline from Cape Scott to Telegraph Cove including Port Hardy
080101	Shoreline of Johnstone Strait

==== Territories ====
CLC	Region
090011	Coastline of Akpatok Island
090012	Coastline of Akimiski Island
090013	Coastline of the Charlton Island
090014	Coastline of the Twin Islands
090015	Coastline of Yukon including Herschel Island
090019	Southern Shoreline of Dolphin and Union Strait
090020	Nunavut Coastline along Coronation Gulf including Kugluktuk
090021	Shoreline of Bathurst Inlet
090022	Coastline from Umingmaktok to Ellice River
090023	Coastline from Ellice River to O'Reilly Island
090024	Shoreline of Rae Strait including Taloyoak and Gjoa Haven
090025	Western Coastline of Boothia Peninsula
090026	Western Coastline of Somerset Island
090027	Northern Coastline of Somerset Island
090028	Eastern Coastline of Somerset Island including Fort Ross
090029	Coastline from Thom Bay to Fort Ross
090030	Shoreline of the Gulf of Boothia including Kugaaruk
090031	Eastern Coastline of King William Island including Gjoa Haven
090032	Western Coastline of Banks Island
090033	Northern Coastline of Banks Island
090034	Eastern Coastline of Banks Island
090035	Southeast Shoreline of Prince of Wales Strait
090036	Northern Shoreline of Dolphin and Union Strait - Victoria Island
090037	Victoria Island Western Coastline: Collinson - Ulukhaktok - Read Isl. (N.W.T.)
090038	Victoria Island Coastline: Edinburgh Island to Read Island
090039	Southern Coastline of Victoria Island including Cambridge Bay and Jenny Lind Isl.
090040	Eastern Coastline of Victoria Island from Stefansson Isl. to Taylor Isl.
090041	Northern Coastline of Victoria Island (Nunavut) including Stefansson Island
090042	Northern Coastline of Victoria Island (Northwest Territories)
090043	Western Coastline of Prince of Wales Island
090044	Eastern Coastline of Prince of Wales Island
090045	Northern Coastline of Prince of Wales Island
090046	Southern Coastline of Bathurst Island
090047	Western Coastline of Bathurst Island
090048	Northern Coastline of Bathurst Island
090049	Eastern Coastline of Bathurst Island
090050	Northern Coastline of Cornwallis Island including Polaris
090051	Southern Coastline of Cornwallis Island including Resolute
090052	Southern Coastline of Devon Island including Dundas Harbour
090053	Northern Coastline of Devon Island
090054	Western Coastline of Devon Harbour
090055	Southern Coastline of Ellesmere Island including Grise Fiord
090056	Coastline of the Northwestern Peninsula of Devon Island
090057	Devon Island Coastline from Norfolk Inlet to Arthur Fjord
090058	Coastline of Byam Martin Island
090059	Eastern Coastline of Melville Island
090060	Southern Coastline of Melville Island
090061	Shoreline of Liddon Gulf
090062	Northern Coastline of Melville Island
090063	Western Coastline of Melville Island
090064	Shoreline of Mcclure Strait of Melville Island
090065	Coastline of Eglinton Island
090066	Western Coastline of the Brodeur Peninsula of Baffin Island
090067	Shoreline of Bernier Bay of Baffin Island
090068	Crown Prince Frederik Island Area - Baffin Island Coastline
090069	Eastern Coastline of Brodeur Peninsula
090070	Western Coastline of Borden Peninsula including Arctic Bay
090071	Northern Coastline of Brodeur Peninsula
090072	Northern Coastline of Borden Peninsula
090073	Coastline from Nunalla to Maguse River
090074	Coastline from Maguse River to Rankin Inlet
090075	Coastline from Rankin Inlet to Fullerton
090076	Southwestern Shoreline of Roes Welcome
090077	Coastline of Ukkusiksalik Nat. Park including Wager Bay
090078	Northwestern Shoreline of Roes Welcome
090079	Western Coastline of Southampton Island
090080	Northeast Coastline of Southampton Island
090081	Northwest Coastline of Coats Island
090082	Southeast Coastline of Coats Island
090083	Western Coastline of Mansel Island
090084	Eastern Coastline of Mansel Island
090085	Western Coastline of Prince Patrick Island
090086	Eastern Coastline of Prince Patrick Island including Mould Bay
090087	Coastline of Emerald Island
090088	Coastline of Brock Island
090089	Coastline of Borden Island
090090	Northern Coastline of Mackenzie King Island
090091	Southern Coastline of Mackenzie King Island
090092	Coastline of Lougheed Island
090093	Western Coastline of Ellef Ringnes Island
090094	Ellef Ringnes Island Southern Coastline including King Christian Isl.
090095	Coastline of Meighen Island
090096	Western Coastlines of Amund Ringnes Island and Cornwall Island
090098	Eastern Coastlines of Amund Ringnes Island and Cornwall Island
090099	Coastline of Graham Island
090100	Ellesmere Island Coastline: Beaumann Fjord - North Kent Isl.
090101	Shoreline of Eureka Sound
090102	Shoreline of Kane Basin
090103	Shoreline of Smith Bay
090104	Coastline of Coburg Island
090105	Eastern Coastline of Devon Island
090106	Northern Shoreline of Repulse Bay including Naujaat
090107	Coastline from Vansittart Island to Winter Island
090108	Coastline from Winter Island to Owlitteeweek Island
090109	Coastline from Owlitteeweek Island to Igloolik
090110	Northern Shoreline of Fury and Hecla Strait
090111	Coastline of Baffin Island: Jens Munk Island to Prince Charles Island
090112	Coastline of Baffin Island from Nuwata to Nedlung
090113	Coastline of Baffin Island from Kinngait to Nuwata
090114	Coastline of the Nottingham Mill and Salisbury Islands
090115	Coastline of Baffin Island from Kinngait to Big Island
090116	Baffin Island Coastline: Big Island to Resolution Island
090117	Shoreline of Frobisher Bay including Iqaluit
090118	Shoreline of Popham Bay including Loks Land and Brevoort Island
090119	Shoreline of Cumberland Sound including Pangnirtung
090120	Coastline from Cape Mercy to Cape Dyer
090121	Coastline from Clyde River to Alexander Bay
090122	Eastern Shoreline of Eclipse Sound including Pond Inlet
090123	Northern Coastline of Bylot Island
090124	Western Shoreline of Eclipse Sound
090125	Coastline of Charles Island
090126	Coastline from Iglooklik to Alfred Island
090127	Southern Coastline of Southampton Island including Coral Harbour
090128	Coastline of Sanikiluaq
090129	Southern Coastline of Victoria Island including Cambridge Bay
090130	Southwestern Coastline of Banks Island including Sachs Harbour
090131	Coastline of Baffin Island from Clyde River to Bylot Island
090132	Western Coastline of Axel Heiberg Island
090133	Shoreline of Nansen Sound and Greely Flord including Eureka
090134	Coastline of Ellesmere Island from Phillips Inlet to Alert
090135	Northeastern Coastline of Ellesmere Island: Lady Franklin Bay - John Richardson Bay
090136	Shoreline of Great Bear Lake
090137	Shoreline of Great Slave Lake Basin
090138	Shoreline of Great Slave Lake - North Arm
090139	Shoreline of Great Slave Lake - East Arm
090140	Coastline from Y.T. to Mackenzie Bay
090141	Coastline from Mackenzie Bay to McKinley Bay including Tuktoyaktuk
090142	Coastline from McKinley Bay to Bathurst Peninsula including Liverpool Bay
090143	Coastline from Bathurst Peninsula to Cape Perry including Franklin Bay
090144	Coastline of Darnley Bay including Paulatuk
090145	Coastline along Tuktut Nogait National Park to Nunavut Border

=== List of tsunami warning regions ===
CLC	Region
010016	Chezzetcook Inlet
010017	Meat Cove
010020	Maine-New Brunswick border
010023	Charlesville
010024	Grand Manan Island
010025	Lockeport
010026	Scatarie Island
010068	Nova Scotia along the Bay of Fundy to Charlesville
010069	Nova Scotia from Charlesville to Chezzetcook Inlet
010070	New Brunswick along the Bay of Fundy including Grand Manan
010071	New Brunswick along the Gulf of St. Lawrence and Northumberland Strait
010072	Prince Edward Island
010073	Nova Scotia from Chezzetcook Inlet to Canso Causeway
010074	Nova Scotia from Port Hawkesbury to Meat Cove (Eastern Cape Breton Island)
010075	Nova Scotia from Port Hawkesbury to Meat Cove (Western Cape Breton Island)
010076	Nova Scotia along Northumberland Strait
010077	Nova Scotia along Sable Island Coastline
020005	Strait of Belle Isle
020006	Cape Ray
020007	La Manche
020013	Cape Makkovik
020014	Battle Harbour
020015	Bonavista
020016	St. Lawrence
020017	Cape Chidley
020036	Western Newfoundland from Cape Norman to Cape Ray
020037	Labrador from Nain to Cape Chidley
020038	Labrador from Emily's Harbour to Nain
020039	Labrador from L'Anse-au-Clair to Emily's Harbour
020040	Southern Newfoundland from Cape Ray to Point May
020041	Southern Newfoundland from Point May to La Manche
020042	Northeastern Newfoundland from La Manche to Cape Freels
020043	Northeastern Newfoundland from Cape Freels to Cape Norman
030092	Quebec along the St. Lawrence waterways including Anticosti Island
030093	Quebec along the St. Lawrence waterways including Îles-de-la-Madeleine
030094	Quebec along the St. Lawrence waterways from Québec City area to Pointe-des-Monts and Capucins
030095	Quebec along the St. Lawrence waterways from Pointe-des-Monts to Sainte-Marie Islands
030096	Quebec along the St. Lawrence waterways from Sainte-Marie Islands to Blanc-Sablon
030097	Quebec along the St. Lawrence waterways including Gaspé Peninsula
080037	Langara
080038	North tip of Vancouver Island
080039	Washington/B.C. border
080076	Zone A - the North Coast and Haida Gwaii
080077	Zone B - the Central Coast and Northeast Vancouver Island coast including Kitimat, Bella Coola and Port Hardy
080078	Zone C - the Outer West Coast of Vancouver Island from Cape Scott to Port Renfrew
080079	Zone D - the Juan de Fuca Strait from Jordan River to Greater Victoria including the Saanich Peninsula
080080	Zone E - the Strait of Georgia including the Gulf Islands Greater Vancouver and Johnstone Strait

== United States ==
In the U.S., the National Weather Service uses zone forecasts, where generally each county is a zone. For counties near the ocean, there are normally two zones: coastal and inland. The same is true for counties that are part mountainous and part lowland, or for counties that are quite long. This older system is not used for warnings, which are based on FIPS codes (two digits for the state, three for the county or independent city), with the initial digit being for optional sub-county divisions. Both of these are becoming less important with the advent of point forecasts, and polygonal warning boxes based on lines drawn between geographic coordinate points. The coordinates of such points are listed at the end of each warning.

The term county warning area is also used to indicate the area of responsibility for each NWS forecast office. The forecast area is usually synonymous with the broadcast range of all NOAA Weather Radio stations programmed from any particular office, though the broadcast callsign followed by "listening area" is often used.
