= 115th meridian west =

Line of longitude

115th meridian west

The meridian 115° west of Greenwich is a line of longitude that extends from the North Pole across the Arctic Ocean, North America, the Pacific Ocean, the Southern Ocean, and Antarctica to the South Pole.

The 115th meridian west forms a great circle with the 65th meridian east.

Between the equator and the 60th parallel south it forms the eastern boundary of the South Pacific Nuclear-Weapon-Free Zone and the western boundary of the Latin American Nuclear-Weapon-Free Zone.

== From Pole to Pole ==
Starting at the North Pole and heading south to the South Pole, the 115th meridian west passes through:

| Co-ordinates | Country, territory or sea | Notes |
|---|---|---|
| 90°0′N 115°0′W | Arctic Ocean | |
| 77°58′N 115°0′W | Canada | Northwest Territories — Brock Island |
| 77°55′N 115°0′W | Ballantyne Strait | |
| 77°19′N 115°0′W | Unnamed waterbody | Passing just west of Emerald Isle, Northwest Territories, Canada at 76°47′N 114°50′W |
| 76°28′N 115°0′W | Canada | Northwest Territories — Melville Island |
| 74°58′N 115°0′W | M'Clure Strait | |
| 73°18′N 115°0′W | Canada | Northwest Territories — Victoria Island |
| 70°36′N 115°0′W | Prince Albert Sound | |
| 70°17′N 115°0′W | Canada | Northwest Territories — Victoria Island; Nunavut — from 70°0′N 115°0′W on Victoria Island |
| 68°52′N 115°0′W | Dolphin and Union Strait | |
| 70°17′N 115°0′W | Canada | Nunavut - mainland |
| 68°10′N 115°0′W | Coronation Gulf | |
| 67°48′N 115°0′W | Canada | Nunavut; Northwest Territories — from 66°16′N 115°0′W, passing through the Great Slave Lake; Alberta — from 60°0′N 115°0′W; British Columbia — from 50°34′N 115°0′W |
| 49°0′N 115°0′W | United States | Montana; Idaho — from 46°58′N 115°0′W; Nevada — from 42°0′N 115°0′W, passing just east of Las Vegas at 36°10′N 115°8′W; California — from 35°17′N 115°0′W |
| 32°42′N 115°0′W | Mexico | Baja California; Sonora — for about 12 km from 32°18′N 115°0′W; Baja California — from 32°11′N 115°0′W; Sonora — for about 2 km from 31°59′N 115°0′W; Baja California — from 31°56′N 115°0′W |
| 29°23′N 115°0′W | Pacific Ocean | Sebastián Vizcaíno Bay, passing just east of Cedros Island, Mexico at 38°10′N 115°9′W |
| 27°50′N 115°0′W | Mexico | Baja California Sur |
| 27°43′N 115°0′W | Pacific Ocean | Passing just west of Clarion Island, Mexico at 18°21′N 114°47′W |
| 60°0′S 115°0′W | Southern Ocean | |
| 74°2′S 115°0′W | Antarctica | Unclaimed territory |

== See also ==
- 114th meridian west
- 116th meridian west
- Eutelsat 115 West B
