= 75th parallel =

75th parallel may refer to:

- 75th parallel north, a circle of latitude in the Northern Hemisphere
- 75th parallel south, a circle of latitude in the Southern Hemisphere
