= Hooper Island =

Island in Northwest Territories, Canada

- Interactive map of Hooper Island

Geography
- Location: Liddon Gulf
- Type: Rock
- Adjacent to: Melville Island

Administration
- Canada

Demographics
- Population: 0 (2020)Island was never inhabited

Additional information
- Time zone: UTC

Hooper Island is a small rock island in the Liddon Gulf of Melville Island, Northwest Territories, Canada. It is located near the shore of Melville Island, in between the Dundas Peninsula, and Bushnan Cove.

== Geography ==
Hooper Island is located in between Bushnan Cove and the Dundas Peninsula, in the Liddon Gulf of Melville Island. It is rocky, small, and not widely known. It is situated in the Northwest Territories' half of Melville Island.

== Arctic climate and permafrost ==
Hooper Island, being in the northern extremes of the Canadian Arctic Islands, is a very cold rock outcrop, and, research shows that permafrost on the island has been present since the early Wisconsinan. Its average temperature in January is −38 °C (−36 °F), though it gets significantly warmer in July, with an average of 9 °C (49 °F), according to Apple Weather.
