= 72nd parallel =

72nd parallel may refer to:

- 72nd parallel north, a circle of latitude in the Northern Hemisphere
- 72nd parallel south, a circle of latitude in the Southern Hemisphere
