= Fitzwilliam Owen Island =

Island in the Northwest Territories, Canada

- Location within Northwest Territories Location within Canada

Geography
- Location: Northern Canada
- Coordinates: 77°7′2″N 113°47′10″W
- Archipelago: Queen Elizabeth Islands; Arctic Archipelago

Administration
- Canada
- Territory: Northwest Territories

Demographics
- Population: Uninhabited

Fitzwilliam Owen Island is an island of the Arctic Archipelago, specifically of the Parry Islands subgroup of the Queen Elizabeth Islands. It belongs to the Northwest Territories, Canada. It lies just west of Eight Bears Island, south-west of the Ballantyne Strait. It is roughly halfway between Mackenzie King Island (to the north-east) and Emerald Isle (to the south-west).
