= 73rd parallel =

73rd parallel may refer to:

- 73rd parallel north, a circle of latitude in the Northern Hemisphere
- 73rd parallel south, a circle of latitude in the Southern Hemisphere
