= 71st parallel =

71st parallel may refer to:

- 71st parallel north, a circle of latitude in the Northern Hemisphere
- 71st parallel south, a circle of latitude in the Southern Hemisphere
