= 74th parallel =

74th parallel may refer to:

- 74th parallel north, a circle of latitude in the Northern Hemisphere
- 74th parallel south, a circle of latitude in the Southern Hemisphere
