= Wynniatt Bay =

Bay in Northwest Territories, Canada

- Location in the Northwest Territories
- Location: Eastern Victoria Island
- Coordinates: 72°45′02″N 110°00′07″W
- Ocean/sea sources: Arctic Ocean
- Basin countries: Canada
- Settlements: Uninhabited

Wynniatt Bay is an Arctic waterway and large inlet on the north side of Victoria Island, Canada, between the Richard Collinson Inlet and Hadley Bay. Most of the bay is in the Northwest Territories, but its eastern extremities (east of the 110th meridian west) are in the Kitikmeot Region of Nunavut. The bay opens into Viscount Melville Sound to the north.
