= Murray Inlet =

The Murray Inlet (75°15′N 114°0′W) is a large inlet on the south-west side of Melville Island, Northwest Territories, Canada. It joins the Liddon Gulf and M'Clure Strait to the south-west.

The Murray Inlet was first charted during Sir William Edward Parry's 1819–1820 expedition of the Northwest Passage.
