= Nanook River =

River in northern Canada

- Location of mouth

Location
- Country: Canada
- Province, Territory: Nunavut, Northwest Territories

Physical characteristics
- Mouth
  - location: Hadley Bay, Viscount Melville Sound
  - coordinates: 71°36′00″N 107°46′59″W
  - elevation: Sea level

The Nanook River (meaning "polar bear") is located on Victoria Island in Northern Canada, commencing in the Northwest Territories and ending in Nunavut.

The Nanook River originates in the island's central plain, south of the Shaler Mountains. about two hours by Twin Otter north of Cambridge Bay.

The river flows east through a rapid into Namaycush Lake, then proceeds north through a series of lakes, the largest of which measures 10km (6.2mi) long by 7km (4.3mi) wide. It's final 8 km (5.0 mi) segment features several uncharted rapids before the river's mouth reaches Hadley Bay, emptying into Viscount Melville Sound.

No glaciers feed the river. Lousewort, Arctic poppy, aven, sedge, willow thickets are found along the river. Arctic fox, lemming, muskox, snowy owl, Peary caribou frequent the river, and polar bears are common at its mouth.

== See also ==
- List of rivers of the Northwest Territories
- List of rivers of Nunavut
