= Pine Island (Queen Charlotte Strait, British Columbia) =

Coordinates: 50°58′38″N 127°43′28″W

Pine Island is a small island in Queen Charlotte Strait about 40 km northwest of Port Hardy in the province of British Columbia, Canada. Pine Island is in the Duke of Edinburgh Ecological Reserve and about 5 km north of Nigei Island.
