= Hadley Bay =

Bay in Arctic Canada

- Location within Nunavut
- Location: Viscount Melville Sound
- Coordinates: 73°01′02″N 110°15′07″W
- River sources: Nanook River
- Ocean/sea sources: Arctic Ocean
- Basin countries: Canada
- Settlements: Uninhabited

Hadley Bay (/ˈhædliː/, HAD-lee) is an Arctic waterway in the Kitikmeot Region, Nunavut, Canada. It is located in western Viscount Melville Sound, by northern Victoria Island. It is east of Wynniatt Bay, and 250 km (160 mi) north of the community of Cambridge Bay. The northwest portion of the bay lies in the Inuvik Region of the Northwest Territories.

== Geography ==
The Nanook River flows north into Hadley Bay. The bay has several unnamed islands within it.

== History ==
Its recent history has included mining exploration.
