= Circles of latitude between the 70th parallel north and the 75th parallel north =

Circles of latitude

Following are circles of latitude between the 70th parallel north and the 75th parallel north:

== 71st parallel north ==
71st parallel north (interactive map)

The 71st parallel north is a circle of latitude that is 71 degrees north of the Earth's equatorial plane, in the Arctic. It crosses the Atlantic Ocean, Europe, Asia and North America, and passes through some of the southern seas of the Arctic Ocean.

At this latitude the sun is visible for 24 hours, 0 minutes during the summer solstice and Civil Twilight during the winter solstice.

=== Around the world ===
Starting at the Prime Meridian and heading eastwards, the parallel 71° north passes through:

Coordinates	Country, territory or sea	Notes
71°0′N 0°0′E	Atlantic Ocean	Norwegian Sea
71°0′N 23°51′E	Norway	Islands of Rolvsøy, Havøya, Måsøya, Magerøya
71°0′N 26°8′E	Barents Sea	
71°0′N 27°15′E	Norway	Nordkinn Peninsula
71°0′N 28°26′E	Barents Sea	
71°0′N 53°0′E	Russia	Novaya Zemlya - islands of Mezhdusharskiy and Yuzhny
71°0′N 56°40′E	Kara Sea	
71°0′N 66°41′E	Russia	Yamal Peninsula
71°0′N 72°35′E	Gulf of Ob	
71°0′N 73°48′E	Russia	Gydan Peninsula
71°0′N 82°12′E	Yenisei Gulf	
71°0′N 83°24′E	Russia	
71°0′N 130°15′E	Laptev Sea	Buor-Khaya Gulf
71°0′N 131°46′E	Russia	Yana-Indigirka Lowland
71°0′N 152°7′E	East Siberian Sea	
71°0′N 154°50′E	Russia	Kolyma Lowland
71°0′N 158°8′E	East Siberian Sea	
71°0′N 178°37′E	Russia	Wrangel Island
71°0′N 178°14′W	Chukchi Sea	
71°0′N 157°23′W	United States	Alaska - North Slope
71°0′N 154°35′W	Beaufort Sea	
71°0′N 127°19′W	Amundsen Gulf	Passing just south of Banks Island, Northwest Territories, Canada
71°0′N 118°24′W	Canada	Northwest Territories - Victoria Island; Nunavut - Victoria Island
71°0′N 104°24′W	M'Clintock Channel	
71°0′N 99°15′W	Larsen Sound	
71°0′N 96°28′W	Canada	Nunavut - Boothia Peninsula
71°0′N 92°52′W	Gulf of Boothia	
71°0′N 89°15′W	Canada	Nunavut - Baffin Island
71°0′N 88°21′W	Bernier Bay	
71°0′N 87°17′W	Canada	Nunavut - Baffin Island, Sillem Island and Baffin Island again
71°0′N 70°34′W	Baffin Bay	
71°0′N 52°30′W	Greenland	Uummannaq Fjord
71°0′N 24°45′W	Hall Bredning	
71°0′N 23°0′W	Greenland	Jameson Land
71°0′N 21°46′W	Atlantic Ocean	Greenland Sea
71°0′N 8°30′W	Norway	Island of Jan Mayen
71°0′N 8°6′W	Atlantic Ocean	Norwegian Sea

== 72nd parallel north ==
72nd parallel north (interactive map)

The 72nd parallel north is a circle of latitude that is 72 degrees north of the Earth's equatorial plane, in the Arctic. It crosses the Atlantic Ocean, Europe, Asia, the Arctic Ocean and North America.

At this latitude, the sun is visible for 24 hours, 0 minutes during the summer solstice and Civil Twilight during the winter solstice. This is the parallel where twilight/nighttime boundary on the equinoxes.

This is also the highest parallel that golden hour occurs even at midnight sun, because the Sun is less than 6°00'00" above the horizon. Midnight Sun without golden hour occurs at latitudes greater than 72°33'38.58804", i.e., about 666.8 km (414.3 mi) north of the Arctic Circle in the case of the June Solstice.

=== Around the world ===
Starting at the Prime Meridian and heading eastwards, the parallel 72° north passes through:

Coordinates	Country, territory or sea	Notes
72°0′N 0°0′E	Atlantic Ocean	Norwegian Sea
72°0′N 23°53′E	Barents Sea	
72°0′N 51°31′E	Russia	Novaya Zemlya - Yuzhny Island
72°0′N 55°22′E	Kara Sea	
72°0′N 68°36′E	Russia	Yamal Peninsula
72°0′N 72°31′E	Gulf of Ob	
72°0′N 74°34′E	Russia	Gydan Peninsula - passing through Gydan Bay and Yuratski Bay
72°0′N 75°42′E	Russia	Gydan Bay - Surrounded by Gydan Peninsula
72°0′N 80°50′E	Yenisei Gulf	
72°0′N 82°32′E	Russia	
72°0′N 129°8′E	Laptev Sea	
72°0′N 139°45′E	Russia	
72°0′N 149°57′E	East Siberian Sea	
72°0′N 178°1′E	Arctic Ocean	
72°0′N 152°16′W	Beaufort Sea	
72°0′N 125°45′W	Canada	Northwest Territories - Banks Island
72°0′N 120°20′W	Prince of Wales Strait	
72°0′N 118°53′W	Canada	Northwest Territories - Victoria Island; Nunavut - Victoria Island
72°0′N 108°23′W	Hadley Bay	
72°0′N 107°31′W	Canada	Nunavut - Victoria Island
72°0′N 104°49′W	M'Clintock Channel	
72°0′N 100°18′W	Canada	Nunavut - Prince of Wales Island
72°0′N 96°27′W	Peel Sound	
72°0′N 95°12′W	Canada	Nunavut - Somerset Island
72°0′N 94°49′W	Bellot Strait	
72°0′N 94°39′W	Canada	Nunavut - Murchison Promontory
72°0′N 94°2′W	Prince Regent Inlet	
72°0′N 89°58′W	Canada	Nunavut - Baffin Island
72°0′N 86°21′W	Admiralty Inlet	
72°0′N 86°0′W	Canada	Nunavut - Baffin Island
72°0′N 74°8′W	Baffin Bay	
72°0′N 54°0′W	Greenland	Nunavik Peninsula
72°0′N 25°0′W	Greenland	Stauning Alps
72°0′N 22°56′W	Atlantic Ocean	Greenland Sea; Norwegian Sea

== 73rd parallel north ==
73rd parallel north (interactive map)

The 73rd parallel north is a circle of latitude that is 73 degrees north of the Earth's equatorial plane, in the Arctic. It crosses the Atlantic Ocean, Europe, Asia, the Arctic Ocean and North America.

At this latitude midnight sun lasts from about May 4th to August 7th, and polar night from about November 12th to January 29th, with nautical polar twilight lasting from about December 11th to January 1st. At noon on the summer and winter solstices, the altitude of the sun is 40.45° and -6.44° respectively. At midnight on the summer solstice, the altitude of the sun is 6.57°.

=== Greenland ===
Between 1776 and 1950, the 73rd parallel formed the northern limit of the Royal Greenland Trade Department's exclusive monopoly on trade near the Dano-Norwegian and later Danish colonies of Greenland (1776–1782) and North Greenland (1782–1950).

=== Around the world ===
Starting at the Prime Meridian and heading eastwards, the parallel 73° north passes through:

Coordinates	Country, territory or sea	Notes
73°0′N 0°0′E	Atlantic Ocean	Greenland Sea; Norwegian Sea
73°0′N 21°51′E	Barents Sea	
73°0′N 53°5′E	Russia	Novaya Zemlya - Yuzhny Island
73°0′N 56°19′E	Kara Sea	
73°0′N 70°3′E	Russia	Southernmost point of Bely Island
73°0′N 70°5′E	Kara Sea	Malygina Strait
73°0′N 74°5′E	Russia	Shokalsky Island
73°0′N 74°40′E	Kara Sea	Passing just south of Neupokoyeva Island, Russia
73°0′N 78°58′E	Russia	Sibiryakov Island
73°0′N 79°22′E	Kara Sea	
73°0′N 80°48′E	Russia	
73°0′N 120°7′E	Laptev Sea	Olenyok Gulf
73°0′N 122°13′E	Russia	Lena delta
73°0′N 129°31′E	Laptev Sea	
73°0′N 139°40′E	East Siberian Sea	Passing just south of Great Lyakhovsky Island, Russia
73°0′N 173°52′E	Arctic Ocean	
73°0′N 145°29′W	Beaufort Sea	
73°0′N 124°36′W	Canada	Northwest Territories - Banks Island
73°0′N 117°35′W	Prince of Wales Strait	
73°0′N 116°44′W	Canada	Northwest Territories - Victoria Island
73°0′N 114°1′W	Richard Collinson Inlet	
73°0′N 113°6′W	Canada	Northwest Territories - Victoria Island
73°0′N 112°53′W	Wynniatt Bay	
73°0′N 110°35′W	Canada	Northwest Territories - Victoria Island
73°0′N 110°18′W	Hadley Bay	
73°0′N 108°7′W	Canada	Nunavut - Victoria Island and Stefansson Island
73°0′N 105°0′W	M'Clintock Channel	
73°0′N 102°30′W	Canada	Nunavut - Prince of Wales Island
73°0′N 101°45′W	Ommanney Bay	
73°0′N 100°25′W	Canada	Nunavut - Prince of Wales Island and Prescott Island
73°0′N 96°35′W	Peel Sound	
73°0′N 95°45′W	Canada	Nunavut - Somerset Island
73°0′N 91°37′W	Prince Regent Inlet	
73°0′N 89°21′W	Canada	Nunavut - Baffin Island
73°0′N 86°23′W	Admiralty Inlet	
73°0′N 85°2′W	Canada	Nunavut - Baffin Island
73°0′N 80°37′W	Navy Board Inlet	
73°0′N 80°7′W	Canada	Nunavut - Bylot Island
73°0′N 76°15′W	Baffin Bay	
73°0′N 55°30′W	Greenland	Puugutaa
73°0′N 23°10′W	Greenland	Geographical Society Island
73°0′N 22°26′W	Atlantic Ocean	Greenland Sea; Norwegian Sea

== 74th parallel north ==
74th parallel north (interactive map)

The 74th parallel north is a circle of latitude that is 74 degrees north of the Earth's equatorial plane, in the Arctic. It crosses the Atlantic Ocean, Europe, Asia, the Arctic Ocean, and North America.

At this latitude the sun is visible for 24 hours, 0 minutes during the summer solstice and nautical twilight during the winter solstice.

=== Around the world ===
Starting at the Prime Meridian and heading eastwards, the parallel 74° north passes through:

Coordinates	Country, territory or sea	Notes
74°0′N 0°0′E	Atlantic Ocean	Greenland Sea; Norwegian Sea
74°0′N 19°48′E	Barents Sea	
74°0′N 54°35′E	Russia	Novaya Zemlya - Severny Island
74°0′N 58°17′E	Kara Sea	
74°0′N 83°52′E	Russia	Rastorguyev Island
74°0′N 84°18′E	Kara Sea	Pyasina Bay
74°0′N 86°49′E	Russia	Taymyr Peninsula, passing through Lake Taymyr
74°0′N 111°31′E	Laptev Sea	Passing just south of Bolshoy Begichev Island, Russia
74°0′N 135°55′E	Russia	New Siberian Islands - Stolbovoy Island
74°0′N 136°13′E	Laptev Sea	
74°0′N 140°19′E	Russia	New Siberian Islands - Little Lyakhovsky Island
74°0′N 141°2′E	East Siberian Sea	
74°0′N 169°43′E	Arctic Ocean	
74°0′N 138°42′W	Beaufort Sea	
74°0′N 124°18′W	Canada	Northwest Territories - Banks Island
74°0′N 116°36′W	Viscount Melville Sound	
74°0′N 98°55′W	Canada	Nunavut - Russell Island
74°0′N 97°44′W	Parry Channel	
74°0′N 95°11′W	Canada	Nunavut - Somerset Island
74°0′N 91°1′W	Parry Channel	
74°0′N 90°3′W	Canada	Nunavut - Prince Leopold Island
74°0′N 89°57′W	Lancaster Sound	
74°0′N 79°0′W	Baffin Bay	
74°0′N 56°31′W	Greenland	Ikermiorsuaq
74°0′N 24°36′W	Greenland	Waltershausen Glacier
74°0′N 21°6′W	Atlantic Ocean	Greenland Sea

== 75th parallel north ==
75th parallel north (interactive map)

The 75th parallel north is a circle of latitude that is 75 degrees north of the Earth's equatorial plane, in the Arctic. It crosses the Atlantic Ocean, Europe, Asia, the Arctic Ocean and North America.

At this latitude midnight sun lasts from April 27 to August 14, and polar night from November 5 to February 5, with the nautical polar twilight stage lasting from November 26 to January 16. At noon on the summer and winter solstices, the altitude of the sun is 38.46° and -8.44° respectively. At midnight on the summer solstice, the altitude of the sun is 8.54°

=== Around the world ===
Starting at the Prime Meridian and heading eastwards, the parallel 75° north passes through:

Coordinates	Country, territory or sea	Notes
75°0′N 0°0′E	Atlantic Ocean	Greenland Sea; Norwegian Sea
75°0′N 18°27′E	Barents Sea	
75°0′N 55°56′E	Russia	Novaya Zemlya - Severny Island
75°0′N 60°26′E	Kara Sea	Passing just south of the Arkticheskiy Institut Islands, Russia
75°0′N 87°19′E	Russia	Taymyr Peninsula, passing through Lake Taymyr
75°0′N 112°53′E	Laptev Sea	
75°0′N 137°43′E	Russia	New Siberian Islands - Kotelny Island and Bunge Land
75°0′N 143°36′E	East Siberian Sea	Passing just south of Faddeyevsky Island, Russia
75°0′N 147°11′E	Russia	New Siberian Islands - New Siberia
75°0′N 150°42′E	East Siberian Sea	
75°0′N 165°33′E	Arctic Ocean	
75°0′N 131°54′W	Beaufort Sea	
75°0′N 124°7′W	M'Clure Strait	
75°0′N 115°53′W	Canada	Northwest Territories - Melville Island
75°0′N 114°47′W	Liddon Gulf	
75°0′N 112°29′W	Canada	Northwest Territories - Melville Island; Nunavut - Melville Island
75°0′N 106°41′W	Viscount Melville Sound	Passing just south of Byam Martin Island, Nunavut, Canada
75°0′N 100°11′W	Canada	Nunavut - Bathurst Island
75°0′N 98°36′W	McDougall Sound	
75°0′N 96°36′W	Canada	Nunavut - Cornwallis Island
75°0′N 93°28′W	Wellington Channel	
75°0′N 92°11′W	Canada	Nunavut - Devon Island and Philpots Island
75°0′N 79°31′W	Baffin Bay	
75°0′N 57°48′W	Greenland	Kjer Glacier
75°0′N 20°24′W	Greenland	Grandjean Fjord and Kuhn Island (King Christian X Land)
75°0′N 19°20′W	Atlantic Ocean	Hochstetter Bay
75°0′N 17°30′W	Greenland	Shannon Island
75°0′N 17°24′W	Atlantic Ocean	Greenland Sea

== See also ==
- Circles of latitude between the 65th parallel north and the 70th parallel north
- Circles of latitude between the 75th parallel north and the 80th parallel north
