= Richard Collinson Inlet =

Canadian inlet

Richard Collinson Inlet (72°54′44″N 113°38′12″W) is a large inlet on the north side of Victoria Island, Northwest Territories, Canada. It opens into Viscount Melville Sound to the north. It is named after Richard Collinson, a Royal Navy officer and Arctic explorer. It should not be confused with the similarly named Collinson Inlet on King William Island.
