= Emerald Isle (Northwest Territories) =

Uninhabited island in the Northwest Territories, Canada

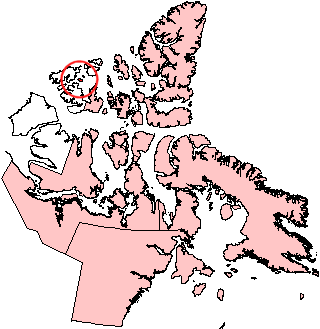
- Emerald Isle, Northwest Territories.

- Location within Northwest Territories Location within Canada

Geography
- Location: Northern Canada
- Coordinates: 76°48′N 114°07′W
- Archipelago: Queen Elizabeth Islands; Arctic Archipelago
- Area: 549 km^{2} (212 sq mi)
- Length: 36 km (22.4 mi)
- Width: 22 km (13.7 mi)

Administration
- Canada
- Territory: Northwest Territories

Demographics
- Population: Uninhabited

Emerald Isle is one of the uninhabited members of the Canadian arctic islands, specifically of the Parry Islands subgroup of the Queen Elizabeth Islands. It belongs to the Northwest Territories, Canada. It has an area of 549 km^{2} (212 sq mi) and measures 36 kilometres (22 mi) long and 22 kilometres (14 mi) wide.
