= Ballantyne Strait =

Natural waterway through Canadian Archipelago

Coordinates: 77°40′N 115°15′W

The Ballantyne Strait is a natural waterway through the central Canadian Arctic Archipelago in the Northwest Territories of Canada. It separates Prince Patrick Island (to the south-west) and Brock Island (to the north-east). It opens into the Arctic Ocean to the north-west.
