= Liddon Gulf =

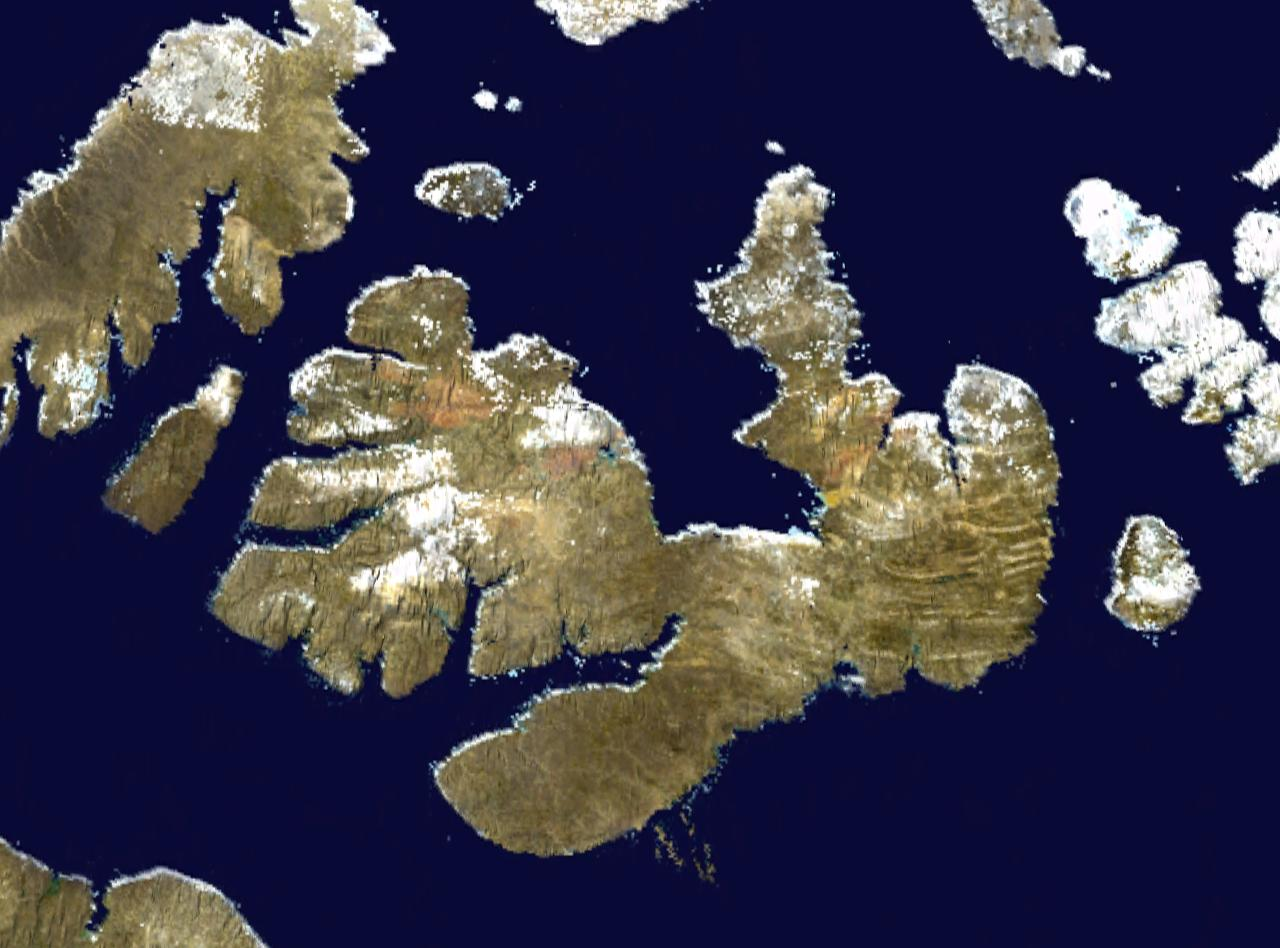
Melville Island, Canada

The Liddon Gulf (75°0′N 113°0′W) is a large inlet on the south-west side of Melville Island, Northwest Territories, Canada. It joins the M'Clure Strait to the south-west.
