= Stuart Bay (Cornwallis Island) =

Bay in Nunavut, Canada

- Location within Nunavut
- Location: Maury Channel
- Coordinates: 75°37′N 94°40′W
- Ocean/sea sources: Arctic Ocean
- Basin countries: Canada
- Settlements: Uninhabited

Stuart Bay is an Arctic waterway in the Qikiqtaaluk Region, Nunavut, Canada. Located off the north of Cornwallis Island, the bay is on the south side of the Maury Channel and to the west is Queens Channel and to the east is Wellington Channel.
