= William Pullen =

British admiral and explorer (1813–1887)

Vice-Admiral William Pullen
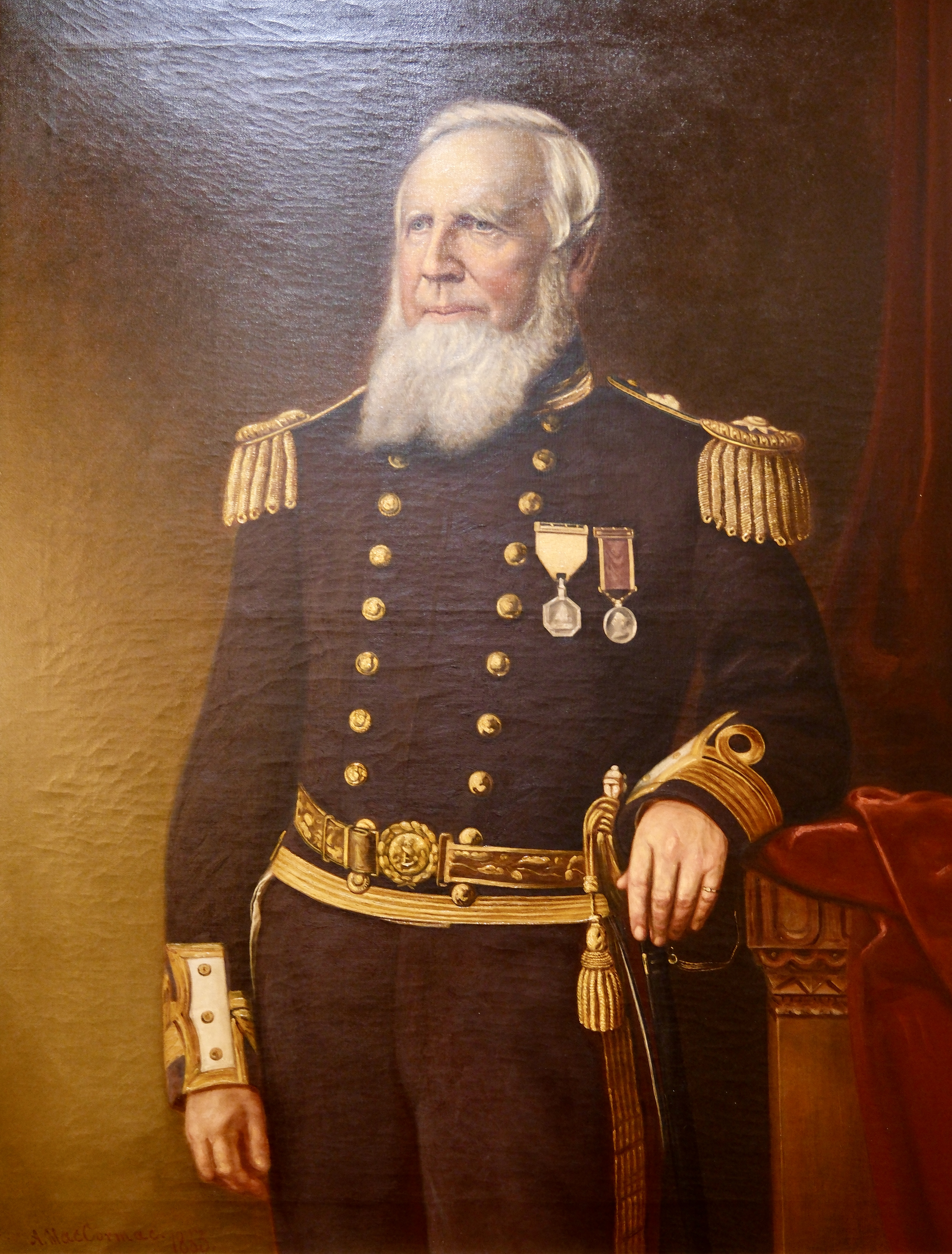
- Official portrait, c. 1900
- Born: 1813; Devonport, Devon, England
- Died: 1887 (aged 73–74); Torquay, England
- Military career
- Allegiance: United Kingdom
- Branch: Royal Navy
- Service years: 1828–1836 & 1842-1870
- Rank: Vice-Admiral
- Commands: HMS North Star; HMS Falcon; HMS Cyclops; HMS Terror
- Conflicts: Crimean War

Vice-Admiral William John Samuel Pullen (4 December 1813 – 22 January 1887) was a Royal Navy officer who was the first European to sail along the north coast of Alaska from the Bering Strait to the Mackenzie River in Canada. His 1849 journey was one of the many unsuccessful expeditions to rescue Sir John Franklin and explore the Northwest Passage.

== Early life ==
Pullen was born in Devonport, Devon, the son of Royal Navy lieutenant William Pullen and Amelia Mary Haswell. After an education at the Greenwich School, he entered the Royal Navy in 1828.

== Career ==
=== South Australia ===
In 1836, Pullen was enticed to leave the navy and go to South Australia as one of Colonel William Light's survey staff, arriving in the colony in August 1836. He was employed in exploring and surveying the mouth of the Murray River, and may be regarded as the discoverer of Port Adelaide, into which he sailed on September 28, 1836, three months before the arrival of the first Governor. He also surveyed part of the Lower Murray, Lake Alexandrina and Port Elliot, and did much to elucidate the geography of the South Australian coast. Several landmarks in that area bore his name: Pullen Point (tip of the peninsula west of the Murray Mouth) and Pullen's Island, a small islet at Port Elliot. In late July and early August 1840, Pullen was in charge of the first expedition along the Coorong to investigate the murders of the survivors of the Maria shipwreck, and took part in Major O'Halloran's subsequent punitive expedition. It is likely that the town of Goolwa would have been named for him but for his association with the summary justice inflicted by this expedition, which also tarnished the reputation of Governor Gawler.

=== Arctic ===
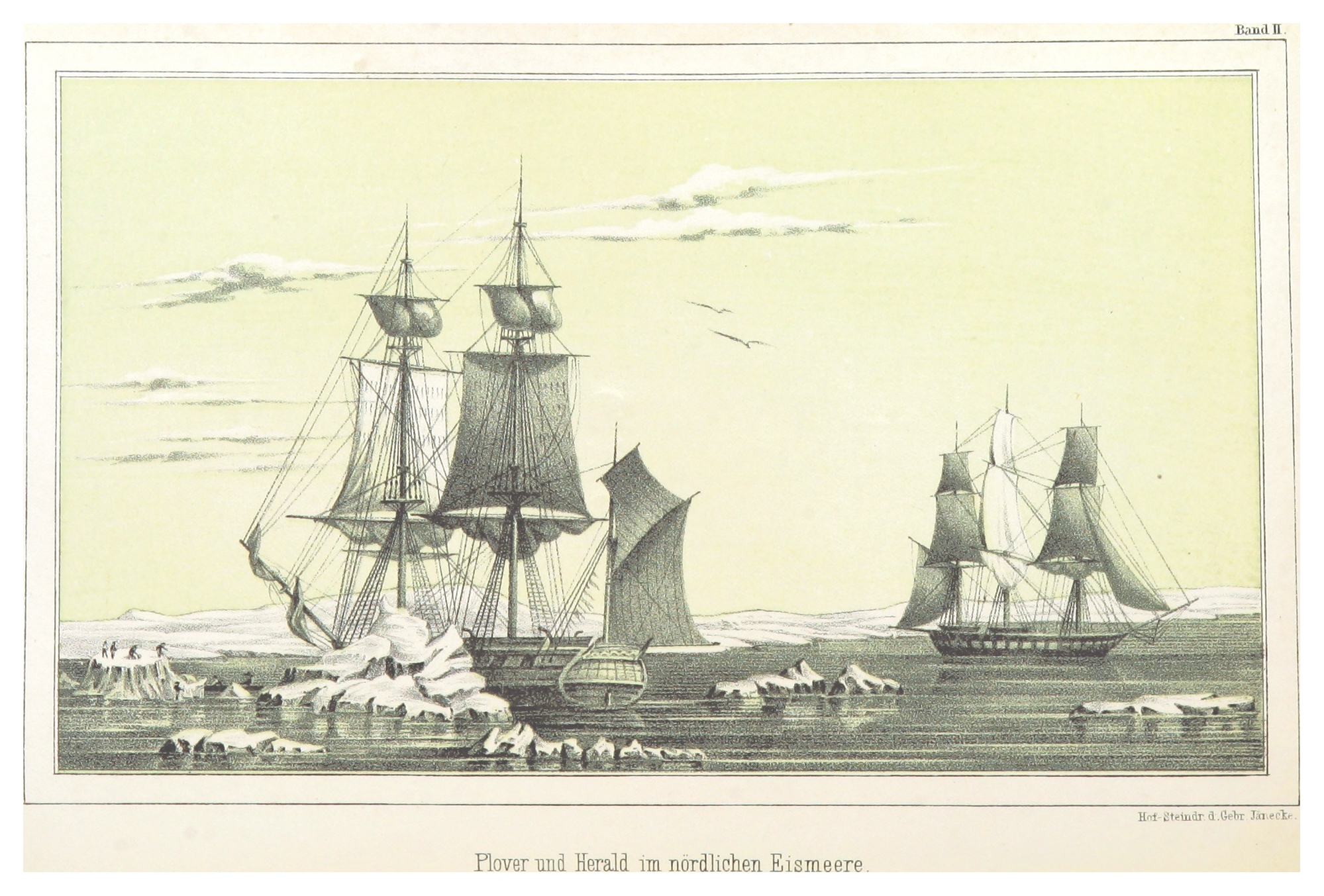
Meeting of HMS Plover and HMS Herald in the Arctic Seas of Alaska

He returned to the navy in 1842, and was stationed on HMS Columbia surveying the Saint John River and the Bay of Fundy, being promoted to lieutenant in the process in 1846. He married Abigail Louisa Berton at Saint John, New Brunswick, in 1845. By 1848 it was clear that Franklin was lost in the Arctic. Three expeditions were sent out: James Clark Ross through the Parry Channel, the Rae–Richardson Arctic Expedition down the Mackenzie River and one through the Bering Strait. HMS Plover under Commander Thomas Moore was sent from England to join the Herald under Henry Kellett which was already in the Pacific. The Plover was a poor sailer, did not make rendezvous and wintered in Providence Bay, Siberia, where William Hulme Hooper made ethnographic observations. The Herald picked up supplies in Panama, went to Kamchatka, waited for the Plover at Kotzebue Sound and on 29 September returned south. Next year, on 15 July 1849, the two ships came together at Kotzebue Sound. What happened to them after is not clear from the sources below.

Pullen was just returning from a survey of the Bay of Fundy when Bathurst asked him to join the Plover. He took a mail steamer to Panama, crossed the isthmus, waited a month for the Plover and then joined the Asia. In May 1849 he joined the Plover at Honolulu. After the boats reached Kotzebue Sound, on 27 July Moore ordered Pullen, 2 officers, 22 men and 4 boats to explore the coast as far at the Mackenzie River. At Point Barrow the ice was so bad that he sent the two largest boats back. He now had 13 men, two whale boats and a purchased umiak. He reached the mouth of the Mackenzie River on 2 September. (Although in 1826 Frederick William Beechey had reached Point Barrow from the west by ship and then small boat and in 1837 Thomas Simpson had reached it from the east by boat and then on foot, Pullen was the first to sail the whole Alaska coast in one voyage.) From the river mouth he went upstream and left most of his exhausted crew at the Hudson's Bay Company post at Fort McPherson. In early October he reached Fort Simpson, where he met the Scottish explorer John Rae. Rae remarked that they were lucky to have had fine weather since they had no proper winter clothing. Next spring his men rejoined him and he headed upriver for York Factory and England. Near the Great Slave Lake he met a canoe with a message from the Admiralty promoting him to commander and ordering him to return and explore Banks Island and Victoria Island. His men volunteered to join him. That summer he took a york boat called Try Again and a Halkett boat downriver and east along the coast until near Cape Bathurst he found the sea filled with an impassible mass of jumbled and broken ice. On 15 August he turned back, and it was on his return that he observed and named Pullen Island and Hooper Island in the Mackenzie estuary in the Beaufort Sea. He spent the winter of 1850–51 at Fort Simpson. Next spring he joined the regular HBC brigade to York Factory and reached London in October 1851.

On his return to England, Pullen learned he had been promoted to commander, and in February 1852, he was placed in command of the depot ship HMS North Star as part of Edward Belcher's expedition in search of John Franklin. Placed at Beechey Island during the next several years, the North Star ended up being the expedition's sole surviving ship after Belcher ordered the other four ships abandoned in the polar ice. They returned to England in October 1854. Pullen Strait, separating Cornwallis Island from Little Cornwallis Island, was named in his honour, while Pullen Point, on eastern Baffin Island, would be named for Thomas Charles Pullen, master of the North Star under his brother William.

=== Later career ===
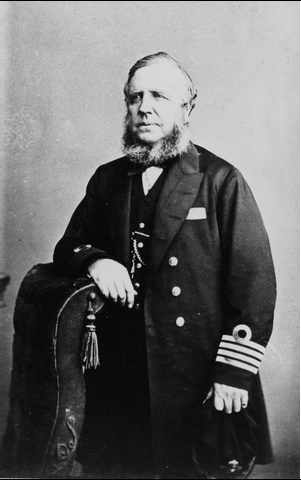
Pullen, c. 1880

In 1855 Pullen was placed in command of HMS Falcon as a part of operations of the Crimean War against Russia forces in the Baltic Sea, and was promoted to captain the next year. His subsequent active commands mostly involved him in surveying: the Red Sea and Ceylon with HMS Cyclops, and Bermuda with HMS Terror. After several years in Coast Guard posts, he was placed in the retired list in 1870, and in retirement was promoted, first to rear admiral, then to vice admiral. He received a Greenwich pension in 1886, and died the next year at Torquay.

== See also ==
- O'Byrne, William Richard (1849). "Pullen, William John Samuel" . A Naval Biographical Dictionary . John Murray – via Wikisource.
- Water Witch (1835 cutter)
