= Pioneer Bay (Cornwallis Island) =

Bay in Qikiqtaaluk Region, Nunavut, Canada

- Location within Nunavut
- Location: Barrow Strait
- Coordinates: 75°00′N 96°30′W
- Ocean/sea sources: Arctic Ocean
- Basin countries: Canada
- Settlements: Uninhabited

Pioneer Bay is a waterway in the Qikiqtaaluk Region, Nunavut, Canada. It lies off the western coast of Cornwallis Island in the eastern high Arctic. It flows into Barrow Strait, to the west is McDougall Sound, which forms part of the Parry Channel.

== History ==
In 1908, Frederick Cook, an American explorer and physician, explored in this region.
