= Queens Channel =

Waterway in Qikiqtaaluk Region, Nunavut, Canada

The Queens Channel (76°11′N 96°00′W) is a natural waterway through the central Canadian Arctic Archipelago in Qikiqtaaluk Region, Nunavut. It is surrounded by Bathurst Island (to the west), Cornwallis and Little Cornwallis Islands (to the south), Baillie-Hamilton and Dundas Islands (to the east), and Devon Island (to the north-east). To the north, the channel opens into the Penny Strait, to the south-west into the Crozier and Pullen Straits, and to the east into the Wellington Channel.
