= Cornwallis Island =

Cornwallis Island may refer to:

- Cornwallis Island (Nunavut), Canada
- Cornwallis Island (Queensland), Australia
- Cornwallis Island (South Shetland Islands), South Shetland Islands

== See also ==
- Little Cornwallis Island, Nunavut
