= Maury Channel =

Watercourse in Nunavut, Canada

The Maury Channel (75°41′N 094°30′W) is a natural waterway through the central Canadian Arctic Archipelago in Qikiqtaaluk Region, Nunavut. It separates Baillie-Hamilton Island (to the north) from Cornwallis Island (to the south). To the west it opens into Queens Channel and to the east into Wellington Channel.
