= Pullen (disambiguation) =

Pullen or Pullens may refer to:

- Pullens buildings, Victorian era tenement buildings in London, UK
- Pullen Corner School, RI, USA
- Pullen Island (Antarctica)
- Pullen Island (South Australia)
- Pullens Lane, Oxford, UK
- Pullen Memorial Baptist Church, Baptist congregation in Raleigh, NC, USA
- Pullen Park, public park in Raleigh, NC, USA
- Pullen Park Carousel, carousel in Raleigh, NC, USA
- Pullen Point, former name of Winthrop, Massachusetts
- Pullen Strait, sea passage in the Canadian arctic
- Pullens, Virginia, USA
