= Margaret Island (Nunavut) =

Island in Nunavut, Canada

- Location within Nunavut Location within Canada

Geography
- Location: Northern Canada
- Coordinates: 76°03′N 094°46′W
- Archipelago: Queen Elizabeth Islands; Arctic Archipelago
- Area: 10 km^{2} (3.9 sq mi)

Administration
- Canada
- Territory: Nunavut
- Region: Qikiqtaaluk Region

Margaret Island is a member of the Queen Elizabeth Islands and the Arctic Archipelago in the territory of Nunavut. It is an irregularly shaped island located 36 km (22 mi) south of Stewart Point, Devon Island. Baillie-Hamilton Island is to the south, and Dundas Island is approximately 1 km (0.62 mi) to the west.
