= Provideniya Bay Airport =

Airport in Chukotka, Russia

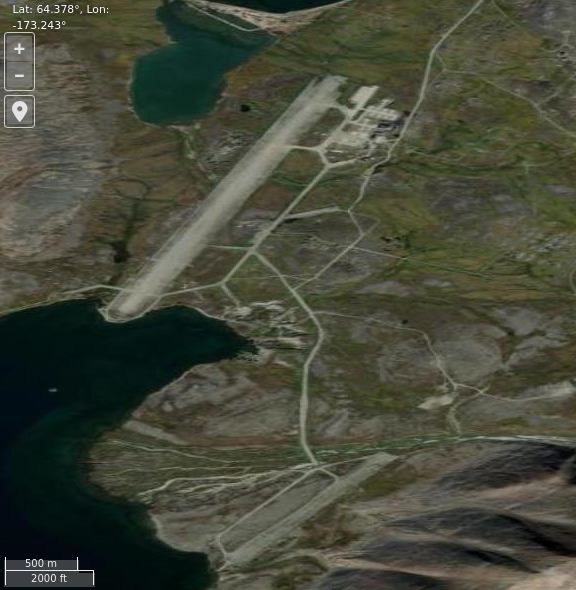
- Satellite imagery of Provideniya Bay airport

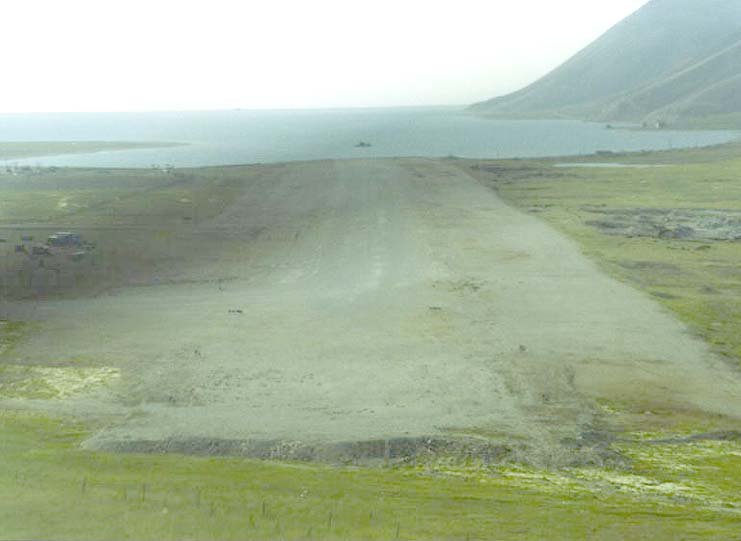
- IATA: PVS; ICAO: UHMD; LID: ПРД

Summary
- Airport type: Public
- Operator: Chukotavia
- Location: Provideniya
- Elevation AMSL: 72 ft (22 m)
- Coordinates: 64°22′42″N 173°14′36″W
- Interactive map of Provideniya Bay Airport

Runways
Direction	Length		Surface
Direction	ft	m	Surface
01/19	6,562	2,000	Gravel and sand

Provideniya Bay Airport (Russian: Аэропорт «Бухта Провидения») (IATA: PVS, ICAO: UHMD) (also Urelik and Ureliki) is a small airport in Chukotka, Russia, located 3 km southwest of Provideniya at the northern end of the Istikhed lake on the eastern side of Provideniya Bay. It services primarily small transport aircraft. A concrete apron contains four parking spaces.

== Military history ==
In 1954, an 8,200 ft (2,500 m) hard surface runway capable of supporting a fighter regiment and jet bomber deployments was constructed. This attracted the interest of the US intelligence community as Provideniya was the closest Soviet military airfield to the United States. By 1964, at least three S-75 Dvina (SA-2) surface-to-air missile sites were identified surrounding the airfield.

529th Fighter Aviation Regiment PVO, part of 25th Air Defence Division, 11th Independent Air Defence Army, was stationed at the airfield from 1960 and 1968. It flew MiG-17 (ASCC Fresco) and MiG-19 aircraft. U.S. intelligence agencies reported it as a division. There were also three Mil Mi-4 helicopters. However after the Cold War, the airfield had deteriorated and was not adequate for Russia's modern military operations. There are anecdotal reports that it has received Tupolev Tu-95MR deployment flights as part of military exercises.

== Civilian history ==
This airport was famous for the 1988 flight of Alaska Airlines known as the Friendship Flight at that time, as well as a similar Bering Air flight in May of the same year.

On 25 July 2005, a Swedish Airforce C-130 Hercules landed in Provideniya Bay, bringing in an international research team from the Beringia 2005 expedition, organized by the Swedish Polar Research Secretariat.

The airport itself and the surrounding towns are not accessible to foreigners without a special permit from the Russian government.

== Airlines and destinations ==
Chukotavia operates infrequent service to the regional capital Anadyr, usually 3-5 times a month. It also operates scheduled helicopter services around the region using a Mi-8, such as to Enmelen, Egvekinot and Lavrentiya.

Bering Air operates chartered tourist flights several times a year using small aircraft such as Beechcraft 1900 and CASA C-212 Aviocar.

Airlines	Destinations
Chukotavia	Anadyr

== See also ==
- List of airports in Russia
- List of military airbases in Russia
