= Crozier Strait =

Natural waterway in Qikiqtaaluk, Nunavut, Canada

Coordinates: 75°35′N 097°13′W

Crozier Strait is a natural waterway in Qikiqtaaluk, Nunavut, Canada. It separates Bathurst Island's Gregory Peninsula to the west from Milne Island and Little Cornwallis Island to the east. The strait, an arm of the Arctic Ocean, connects Queens Channel to the north with the McDougall Sound to the south. Kalvik Island is located within the strait, as is Karluk Island, an archaeological site.

Crozier Strait is named after Irish Royal Navy officer and polar explorer Francis Crozier.
