= Truro Island =

Uninhabited island in the Canadian Arctic

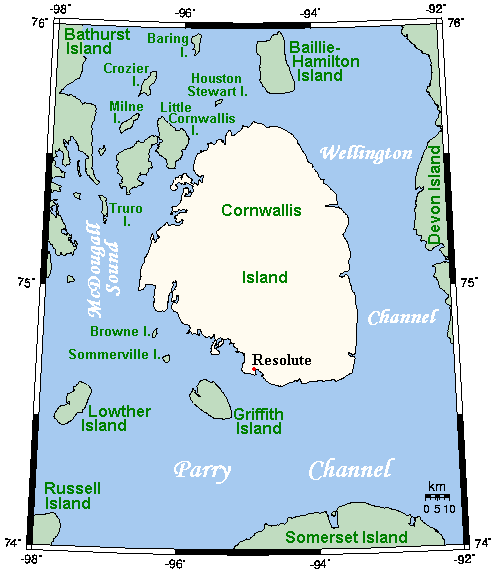
- A closeup map showing Truro Island

- Location within Nunavut Location within Canada

Geography
- Location: Northern Canada
- Coordinates: 75°17′N 97°11′W
- Archipelago: Queen Elizabeth Islands; Arctic Archipelago
- Area: 21 km^{2} (8.1 sq mi)

Administration
- Canada
- Territory: Nunavut
- Region: Qikiqtaaluk

Demographics
- Population: Uninhabited

Truro Island lies within the Arctic Archipelago in the Qikiqtaaluk Region of northern Canada's territory of Nunavut. It is one of the mid-waterway islands in the McDougall Sound between Bathurst Island and Cornwallis Island. Long and narrow, the island is 21 km^{2} (8.1 sq mi).

== Collaborative Interdisciplinary Cryospheric Experiment ==
Truro Island was the base camp for several Collaborative Interdisciplinary Cryospheric Experiment (C-ICE) studies which provide data on atmosphere, sea ice, and ocean interaction, including C-ICE'2000, C-ICE'2001, and C-ICE'2002.

== See also ==
- David G. Barber
