= Dundas Island =

Dundas Island may refer to:

- Dundas Island (British Columbia), Canada, located near the city of Prince Rupert.
- Dundas Island (Nunavut), Canada
- Dundas Island, New Zealand, one of the Auckland Islands
