= Griffith Island (Nunavut) =

Island in Nunavut, Canada

- Location within Nunavut Location within Canada

Geography
- Location: Northern Canada
- Coordinates: 74°35′N 095°30′W
- Archipelago: Queen Elizabeth Islands; Arctic Archipelago
- Area: 189 km^{2} (73 sq mi)

Administration
- Canada
- Territory: Nunavut

Demographics
- Population: Uninhabited

Griffith Island lies within the Arctic Archipelago in the Qikiqtaaluk Region of northern Canada's territory of Nunavut. It is one of the mid-channel islands in the western sector of Barrow Strait.

Griffith Island lies directly across from the Inuit hamlet Resolute on Cornwallis Island, separated by the 6.5 mi (10.5 km) wide Resolute Passage.

Captain Horatio Austin, on board the ship Resolute and seeking the lost Sir John Franklin expedition, wintered off Griffith Island in 1851. Explorations that winter by second master, George F. McDougall, included McDougall Sound, the waterway to the north of Griffith Island.

Griffith Island is 18 by 11 km (11.2 by 6.8 mi), and 189 km^{2} (73 sq mi) in area.

Since 1958, the southeast coast of Griffith Island has experienced uncommon change, from discontinuous flying spits to continuous fringing barriers.

On April 25, 2021, a Great Slave Helicopters owned helicopter that was surveying polar bear populations crashed on Griffith Island, killing all three on board.
