= Istikhed =

Lake of Chukotka Autonomous Okrug

- Истихед / Ыстигэт
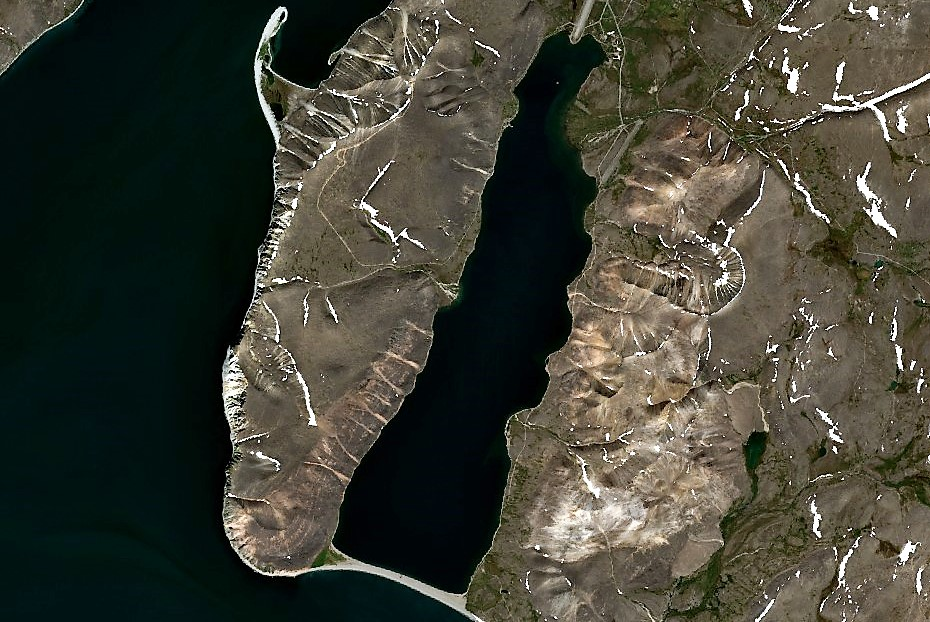
- Sentinel-2 image of the lake in June

- Location in Chukotka Autonomous Okrug, Russian Far East
- Location: Chukotka Autonomous Okrug
- Coordinates: 64°48′27″N 174°40′58″W
- Type: Coastal lagoon
- Basin countries: Russia
- Max. length: 9.4 km (5.8 mi)
- Max. width: 2.5 km (1.6 mi)
- Surface area: 14.2 km^{2} (5.5 sq mi)
- Islands: None

Istikhed (Russian: Истихед) or Ystiget (Russian: Ыстигэт) is a lake in Providensky District, Chukotka Autonomous Okrug, Russian Federation.

There are no permanent settlements on the shores of the lake. Provideniya lies 4 km (2.5 mi) to the north and the Provideniya Bay Airport runway ends at the northern tip of the lake. The name of the lake derives from the English toponym "East Head," a mountain rising above the shore of the lake.

== Geography ==
Istikhed is a coastal lagoon of the Chukotka Peninsula, at the southeastern end of the Chukotka Mountains. It located by the eastern side of Providenya Bay and stretches roughly from NNE to SSW for almost 10 km (6.2 mi). The northern section is narrow and the lake broadens towards its southern end, which is separated from Anadyr Bay to the south by a narrow pebbly landspit. The water is clear and the lake bottom is pebbly.

Lake Istikhed freezes in early October and stays under ice until mid-June. There are no rivers entering the lake. The lake water is used for the Providenya combined heat and power station.

== Fauna ==
There are two fish species in the waters of the lake, the Chukot char (Salvelinus andriashevi), an endemic char species only found in Istikhed, and the ninespine stickleback.

Among the bird species wintering in the lakeshore, the eider, long-tailed duck, common murre and Bering cormorant deserve mention.

== See also ==
- List of lakes of Russia
