= Pullen Strait =

Watercourse in Nunavut, Canada

Pullen Strait (75°30′N 096°00′W) is a natural waterway through the central Arctic Archipelago in the territory of Nunavut. It separates Little Cornwallis Island (to the north-west) from Cornwallis Island (to the south-east), and is named after William Pullen.
