= Providence Bay =

Fjord in Siberia

- Emma Harbor, Plover Bay, Ureliki
- Бу́хта Провиде́ния (Russian)
- Location of Providence Bay in the Bering Sea
- Location: Far North
- Coordinates: 64°23′40″N 173°19′50″W
- Ocean/sea sources: Bering Sea
- Basin countries: Russia
- Max. width: 34 km (21 mi)
- Average depth: 150 m (490 ft)

Providence Bay (Russian: Бу́хта Провиде́ния, Bukhta Provideniya) is a fjord in the southern coast of the Chukchi Peninsula of northeastern Siberia. It was a popular rendezvous, wintering spot, and provisioning spot for whalers and traders in the nineteenth and early twentieth centuries. Emma Harbor (now Komsomolskaya Bay) is a large sheltered bay in the eastern shore of Providence Bay. Provideniya and Ureliki settlements and Provideniya Bay Airport stand on the Komsomolskaya Bay. Plover Bay in English sources sometimes refers specifically to the anchorage behind Napkum Spit within Providence Bay (also called Port Providence) but was commonly used as a synonym for Providence Bay; Russian 19th century sources used the term for an anchorage within Providence Bay.

Plover Bay takes its name from HMS Plover, a British ship which overwintered in Emma Harbor in 1848–1849. HMS Plover with captain Thomas E. L. Moore left Plymouth in January 1848 for the Bering Sea to find the lost Franklin Expedition. On October 17, 1848, Moore anchored his ship in a safe harbor; he is given credit for the name Providence Bay and for the first successful wintering of a ship in Bering Sea region. Lieutenant William Hulme Hooper of the Plover attributes the name Port Emma (or Emma's Harbor) to Captain Moore but provides no explanation of the choice of name.

== Geography ==
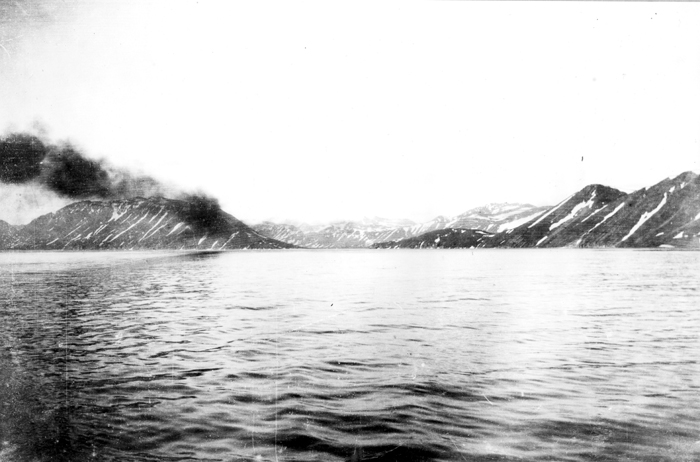
East coast of Providence Bay above Plover Spit, 1899

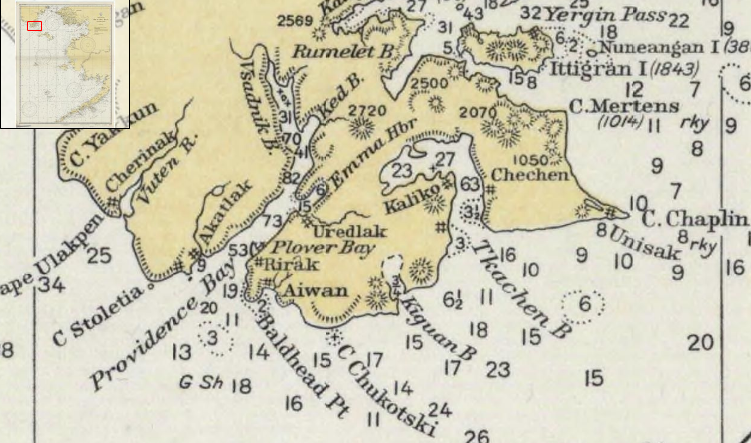
United States Coast and Geodetic Survey chart detail, 1928

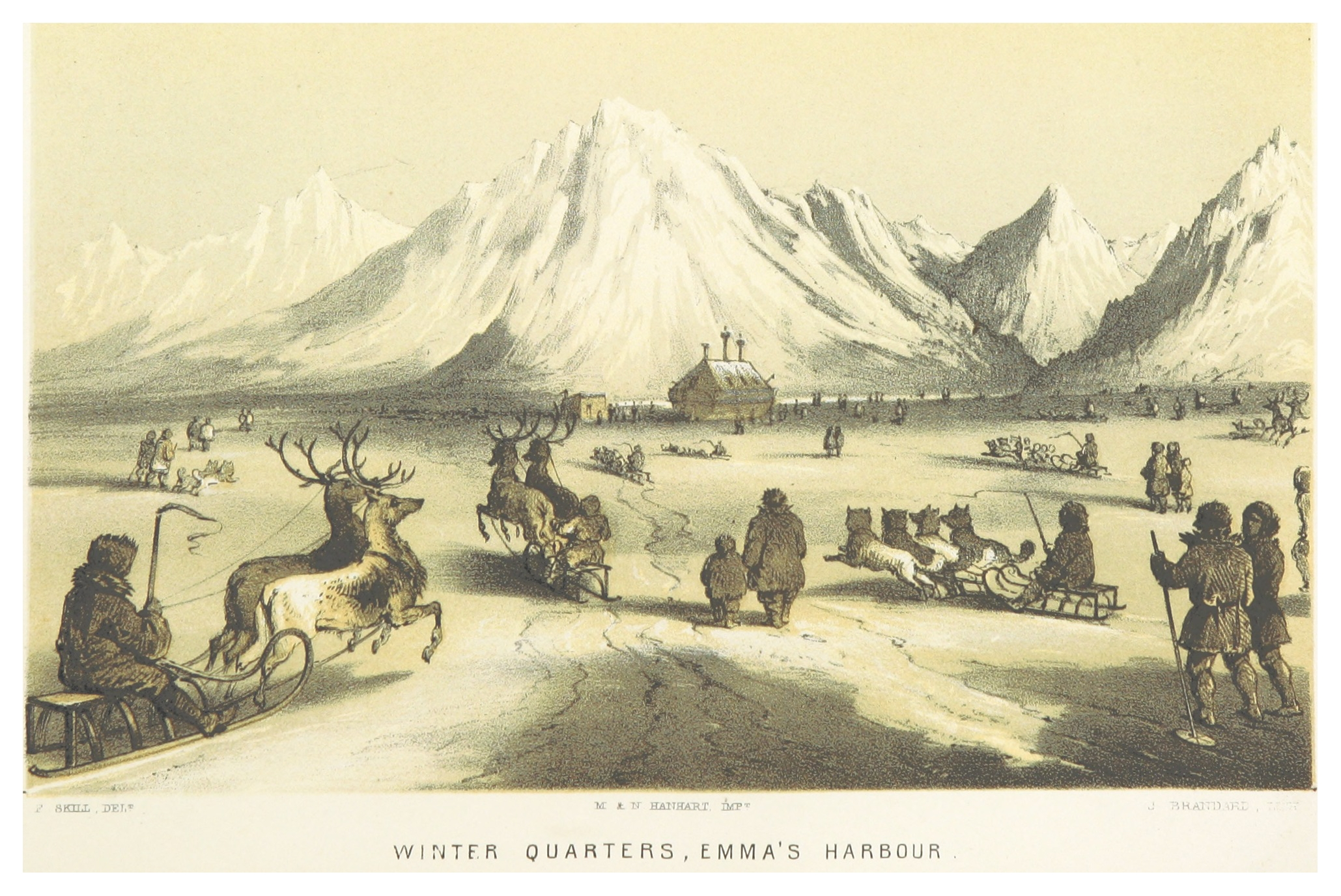
Emma Harbor 1849 (by HOOPER)

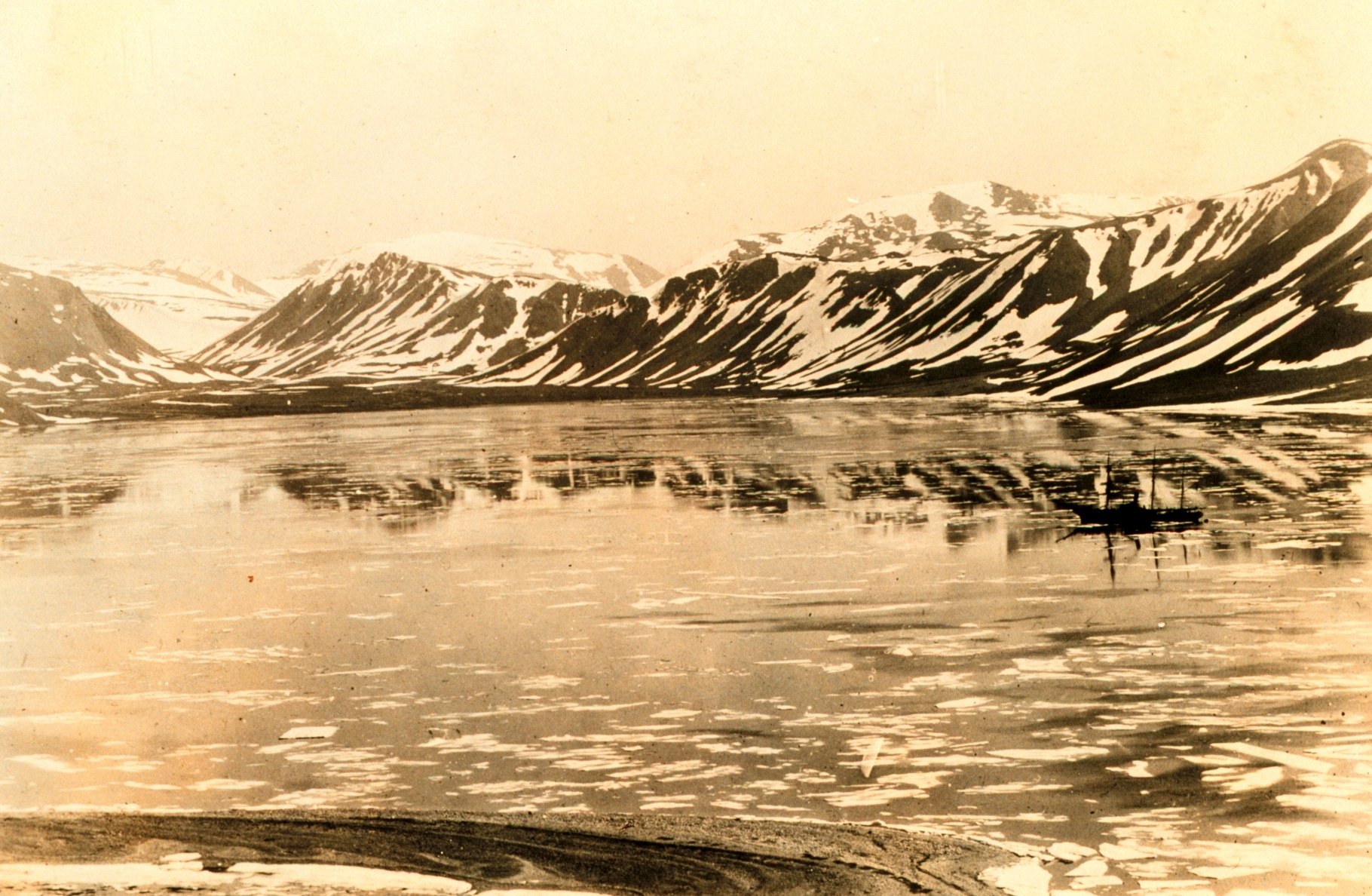
Emma Harbor 1921 with USCG Bear

The entrance to Providence Bay is delineated by Mys Lysaya Golova (East Head, Baldhead Point) on the east and by Mys Lesovskogo on the west. Mys Lysaya Golova is about 7 miles (11 km) west-northwest of Cape Chukotsky. Providence Bay is about 8 km wide at its mouth and 34 km long (measured along the midline). It is about 4 km wide through much of its length below Emma Harbor, and about 2.5 km wide just above the juncture. The lower part of the bay runs roughly northeast, while the upper part (above the branch shown as Ked Bay) dog-legs north and is about 2 km wide. Depth soundings (USCGS 1928) show 19 fathoms (35 m) at the entrance and a maximum depth of 82 fathoms (150 m). A more recent chart (USCS 2000) shows depths of 10 to 11 fathoms (18 to 20 m) at the entrance.

Emma Harbor has been described as "the best harbor on the Asiatic coast north of Petropavlosk...." and is currently the only important harbor on Providence Bay. It is a fjord in its own right, about 14 km from the mouth of Providence Bay and about 1.5 x 6 km in extent with depths shown from 6 to 15 fathoms (11 to 27 m). Besides Emma Harbor there are three or four other sheltered anchorages within Providence Bay that are named by early writers: Port Providence, Cache Bay (also Ked Bay or Cash Cove), Telegraph Harbor, and Snug Harbor. Port Providence (now Buhkta Slavyanka or Reid Plover) is the anchorage behind Plover Spit, which provides a natural breakwater. It currently serves as the quarantine and hazardous cargo anchorage for Provideniya. Plover Spit is called Napkum Spit in an 1869 account; it projects into the bay from the eastern shore about 8 km from the mouth of the fjord. It has its origin in the moraine left by the glacier that carved the fjord. The tip of the spit is Mys Gaydamak. Cache bay is the cove in the eastern shore of the fjord, north of Emma Harbor. Snug Harbor is located near the head of the bay, behind Whale Island. Telegraph Harbor is named for the Western Union Telegraph Expedition of 1866-1867 which wintered there (remains of Western Union cabin were reportedly still standing in 1960). It may be the same as Snug Harbor. The United States Coast and Geodetic Survey chart shows the entire upper portion of the fjord as Vsadnik Bay. The Asiatic Pilot of 1909 refers to Vladimir Bay and Cache Bay, separated by Popov point, and notes that the bays are shallower above this point.

Plover Spit is site of an abandoned Eskimo village with characteristic semi-underground houses, a more recent village of yarangas, and one of the 1869 eclipse observatories (see below). The U.S. Coast and Geodetic Survey charts show the village at the base of the spit as Rirak, and starting in 1928 show a village Uredlak on the south shore of Emma Harbor The Soviet-era village of Plover was probably located on the mainland near the spit; it was damaged by a landslide and the inhabitants (including some relocated from Ureliki) were relocated to Provideniya. Nasskatulok, a Yupik village at the head of Plover Bay was reported by Aurel Krause (observed 1881) but not mentioned by Waldemar Bogoras (ca. 1898) There were also villages on the coast. Aiwan (Avan), a Yupik village, lay east of the bay between the sea and Lake Istikhed (a freshwater lake named after the English toponym "East Head"; called Lake Moore in some English-language sources ). It was reportedly abandoned in 1942 due to concern it could be hit by Soviet Navy shells; another source has it evacuated in 1941 to make way for coast-defense artillery; yet another source has it occupied into the 1950s. The USCGS chart shows a village Akatlak just west of the mouth of the bay.

== History ==
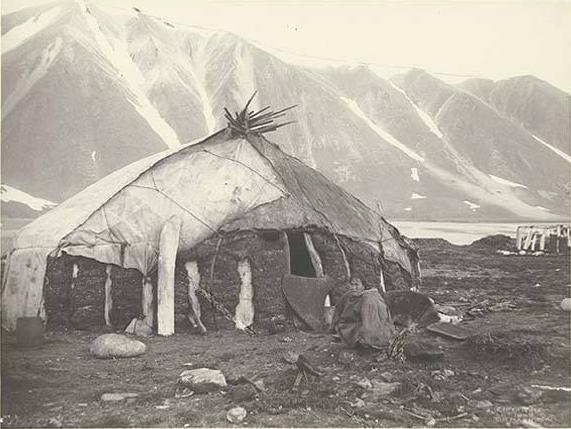
A winter house on the spit at Plover Bay, 1899

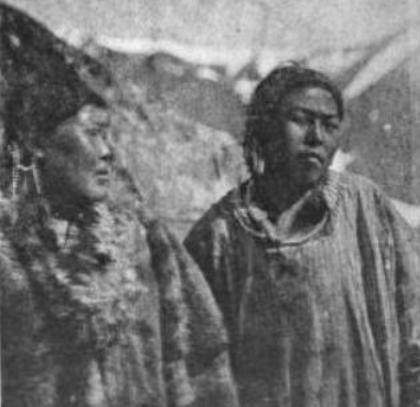
Two native women of Plover Bay, photographed by E.W. Nelson of the Corwin in 1881

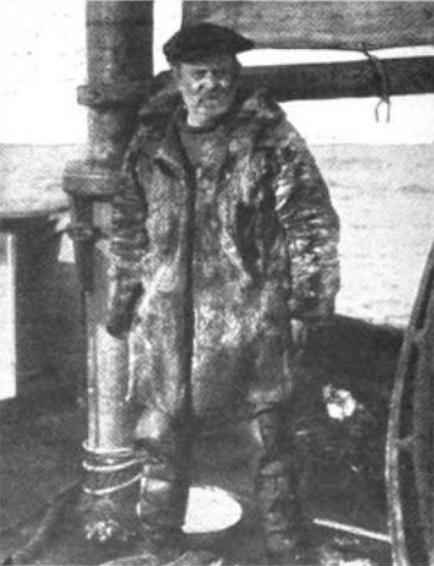
Bally Thompson, Estonian trader at Emma Harbor, 1921

Providence Bay and Emma Harbor do not appear on maps before 1850; it is thought they were visited by whalers in the period 1845-48 just prior to the Plover's visit. Providence Bay was probably visited by Russian explorer Kurbat Ivanov in 1660 but his explorations of the Gulf of Anadyr were not widely reported. Golden Gate, a ship of the Russian–American Telegraph Expedition, visited Plover Bay in September 1865, having just missed encounter with "the famed and dreaded" CSS Shenandoah. Frederick Whymper, member of this expedition, reported that by this time "it was no uncommon thing to find several whaling vessels lying inside in summer". Whymper (and later John Muir) described the mountains around Plover Bay as "composed of an infinite number of fragments split up by action of frost... innumerable and many-coloured lichens and mosses are the only vegetation to be seen, except on a patch of open green country near Emma Harbour, where domesticated reindeer graze."

The area around Providence Bay provided good whaling in the early days, particularly in the fall; this may account for some of its popularity as a wintering spot. In 1860, the Supreme Court of Hawaii ruled in favor of eight seamen of the whaling brig Wailua of Honolulu which wintered in Plover Bay 1858-9 after staying too late into the fall. Captain Lass maintained he had become icebound unintentionally having entered the bay to take on water and remained because of the good whaling. The whaling in this instance was done from boats operating from the harbor, where the ship remained moored. The crew members alleged that Lass had planned on overwintering, subjecting them to hardship and extending their service in violation of their contract. The court ruled for the seamen, holding that although intention was not proved, Captain Lass's actions amounted to recklessness. Whymper describes witnessing the pursuit and processing of whales within the bay in 1866. In 1871, the whaling bark Oriole, damaged by ice, limped or was towed into Plover Bay to attempt repairs. According to John Spears colorful account, Captain Hayes had taken his ship through the ice to reach open water off the Siberian coast, hoping to have the large schools of whales near Plover Bay to himself, but the ship hit a large ice floe. The Oriole was subsequently abandoned in the bay; in Spears account, she was tipped on her side for repairs when a hatch gave way, flooding and sinking the ship in minutes. By 1880, a visitor on the schooner Yukon found the village on the spit much reduced; whales were no longer abundant and many residents had moved west in search of better hunting. The village dogs had all died due to lack of food.

In 1875 Russian clipper Gaydamak under command of Sergey Tyrtov anchored in Providence Bay. Tyrtov, ordered to enforce state monopoly on coastal trading, distributed to local Chukchis printed leaflets addressed to foreign merchants. He then headed north to Saint Lawrence Bay where he intercepted Timandra, an American merchant boat involved in trading walrus ivory for alcohol. In 1876 the mission was continued by captain Novosilsky on board of Vsadnik. Vsadnik anchored in Plover Bay July 5, 1876, performed hydrographic survey of the area and then headed north; she passed Bering Strait, turned west, reaching Cape Schmidt (then Cape Severny, or North Cape in English usage) and safely returned to base. Vsadnik did not meet any merchant boats, but found evidence of recent trading with America (including unfinished vodka barrels) in Chukchi huts.

In 1881 Russian Strelok anchored in Providence Bay. Strelok, apart from surveys and border control, was tasked with rescuing crews of two missing American whaling ships, however, soon the crew of American schooner Handy told Russians that one of the missing ships sank with no survivors; the other crew was already safe in San Francisco. Instead, Strelok found and resupplied the German scientific expedition of Aurel Krause. At Saint Lawrence Bay Strelok met USS Rodgers; both ships headed north to Bering Strait but soon separated. Strelok reached Cape Dezhnev (then Cape Vostochny) and turned back while Rodgers reached Wrangel Island. In the same year, the U.S. revenue cutter Corwin, also searching for the lost whalers and for the missing US exploration vessel USS Jeannette took on coal at Plover Bay. This was Russian government coal, piled on the bank; there is no indication the coaling station had any resident staff. John Muir, aboard the Corwin as naturalist, took advantage of these stops to make geological observations in the mountains east of the fjord

An article from 1879 quotes a letter from William Healey Dall, referring in passing to "the white men's trading station at Plover Bay". It is not clear whether Dall meant an established trading post, or simply a rendezvous. As late as 1880, the only settlement mentioned by an anonymous visitor on the USC&GS schooner Yukon was a native village. The Northeastern Siberian Company had a trading station, called Vladimir, on Plover Bay from at latest 1903 until about 1910. In 1908 the steamer Corwin unloaded cargo at Vladimir Station; this was the former revenue cutter that carried Muir in 1881. By 1913 Emma Harbor was the home of baron Kleist, the Russian administrator for Kamchatka uezd, of a district judge, and of an Estonian trader, Bally Thompson, who maintained a store there. Baron Kleist's house, built of squared logs with curlicue trim cut from planks, stood on the eastern shore of the bay between two outbuildings. It was put up about 1909 at a cost of about $15,000, with materials brought up from Vladivostok. In 1926, Yupik people from Provideniya Bay were recruited to settle Wrangel Island. In 1930, Provideniya Bay served as a temporary base for Soviet aircraft to evacuate passengers from the Soviet steamer Stavropol, frozen in off Mys Schmitda on the northern coast of Chukotka. These aircraft were delivered by the icebreaker Litke; the passengers, transported by aircraft and sledge, wintered at Provideniya Bay and were picked up by the Stavropol the next July.

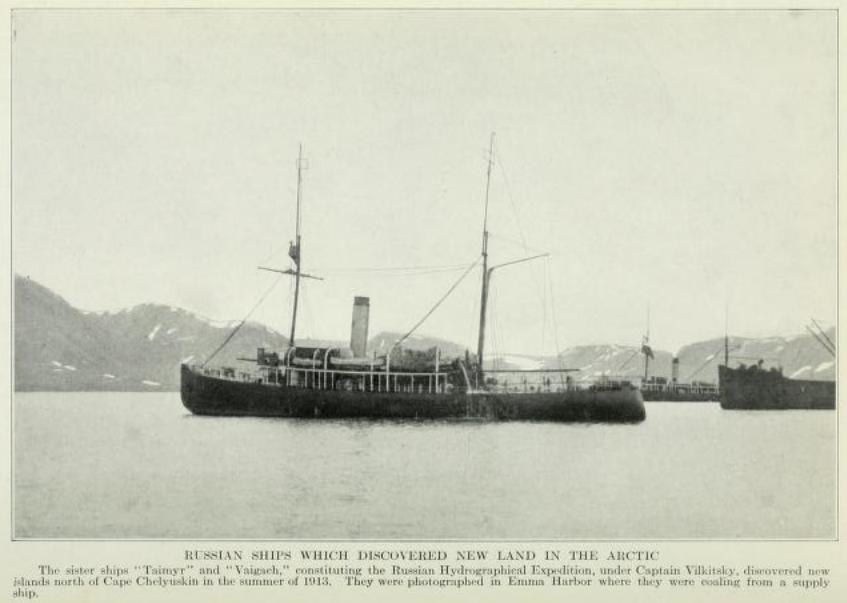
Russian icebreakers Taimyr and Vaigach coaling from a freighter at Emma Harbor, 1913

Emma Harbor and Providence Bay were favored sites for scientific observers. These included investigators from the US Naval Observatory attempting to observe the 1869 solar eclipse, several ornithological collectors, geologists, and the U.S. Coast and Geodetic Survey (geomagnetic observations) in 1921. The Harriman Alaska Expedition visited there in July 1899 and produced many good photographs illustrating topography and native life. John Muir noted that by 1899 there were around fifty Chukchis living in a dozen huts covered with walrus hide, already "spoiled by the contact with civilization of the whaler seamen". John Burroughs noted that "they were not shy of our cameras and freely admitted us to the greasy and smoky interiors of their dwellings" and "some of the natives showed a strain of European blood."

In 1921, there were reported efforts by Japan to assert control of the area, and the strategic importance of the bay was noted by an American writer . Two Soviet-era settlements, Provideniya and Ureliki, were built on Komsomolskaya Bay in the 20th century, and the bay was used as a naval harbor. It was the major supply point for the Chukotka region during World War II. After the breakup of the Soviet Union five border patrol boats stationed in Provideniya stayed idle at the port for three years due to lack of fuel. Ureliki, a military city, is reportedly now abandoned, but the adjacent Provideniya Bay Airport remains.

== See also ==
- List of fjords of Russia
- List of inhabited localities in Providensky District
- File:Plover Bai.PNG Map from a 1906 atlas - identifies Cache Bay, Mount Kennicott
- File:Plover Bay Sketch Map 1869.PNG Professor Hall's sketch map of Plover Bay and Emma Harbor 1869
- Provideniya Bay Airport
