= Friendship Flight (Alaska Airlines) =

In the late 1980s, a group of Alaska officials, academics, business leaders, entrepreneurs, artists, Native elders, students, and others organized a “friendship flight” from Nome, Alaska to Provideniya in Russia’s Chukotka region. It was a singular flight operated by Alaska Airlines on June 13, 1988. There were 82 passengers on board and the flight lasted 45 minutes.
