= Baillie-Hamilton Island =

Uninhabited island in the Arctic Archipelago

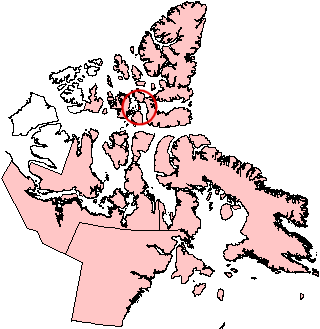
- Baillie-Hamilton Island, Nunavut

- Location within Nunavut Location within Canada

Geography
- Location: Northern Canada
- Coordinates: 75°53′N 94°35′W
- Archipelago: Queen Elizabeth Islands; Arctic Archipelago
- Area: 290 km^{2} (110 sq mi)
- Length: 27 km (16.8 mi)
- Width: 22 km (13.7 mi)

Administration
- Canada
- Territory: Nunavut

Demographics
- Population: Uninhabited

Baillie-Hamilton Island is one of the uninhabited members of the Queen Elizabeth Islands in the Canadian arctic islands in Nunavut, Canada. The island is rectangular in shape, 26 to 12 km (16.2 to 7.5 mi), and has an area of 290 km^{2} (110 sq mi).

Baillie-Hamilton Island is surrounded by larger islands. Devon Island is to the north and the east, across Wellington Channel. Cornwallis Island is to the south, across Maury Channel. Bathurst Island is to the west, across Queens Channel.
