= Dundas Island (Nunavut) =

Island in Qikiqtaaluk Region, Nunavut, Canada

- Location within Nunavut Location within Canada

Geography
- Location: Northern Canada
- Coordinates: 76°05′N 95°00′W
- Archipelago: Queen Elizabeth Islands; Arctic Archipelago
- Area: 51 km^{2} (20 sq mi)

Administration
- Canada
- Territory: Nunavut

Demographics
- Population: Uninhabited

Dundas Island is a member of the Queen Elizabeth Islands and the Arctic Archipelago in the territory of Nunavut. It is an irregularly shaped island located between Devon Island and Baillie-Hamilton Island. The smaller Margaret Island is 1 km (0.62 mi) to the east of Dundas.

Dundas Island is named in honour of Henry Dundas, 1st Viscount Melville, Viscount Melville and British Secretary of State for the Home Department.

After showings were discovered on Dundas Island in 1972, geochemical sampling, mapping, and surveying began the following year. Canadian mining company Cominco (now part of Teck Resources) staked claims in 1974 and drilling occurred at high grade lead-zinc showings at the Thumb Mountain Formation and Disappointment Bay Formation in 1975. Cominco began IP surveys in 1981.

Robert John McGhee's 1981 research found evidence of Late Dorset warm-season dwellings on Dundas Island.

There is a second, much smaller (longest axis ~500 m) Dundas Island also in Nunavut, off Boothia Peninsula, in St. Roch Basin, across from King William Island.
