= William Hulme Hooper =

English naval officer and polar explorer

- Born: 13 June 1826; Portsmouth, Hampshire, England
- Died: 19 May 1854 (aged 27); London, Middlesex, England
- Military career
- Branch: Royal Navy
- Rank: Lieutenant

William Hulme Hooper (13 June 1826 – 19 May 1854) was an English Royal Navy officer and Arctic explorer who served on HMS Plover under Commander Thomas E. L. Moore, which sailed out of Plymouth, England, in 1848, on a mission to find the lost remains of Sir John Franklin's Northwest Passage expedition of 1845.

South of the Bering Straits at the onset of winter, the Plover overwintered in Providence Bay, Siberia, which they named for the fortune that brought them there. Hooper and his companions fell in with the Chukchi, an experience he wrote about in his book Ten Months among the Tents of the Tuski (1853).

His health weakened by three Arctic winters, Hooper died in London on 19 May 1854.
