= McDougall Sound =

Arctic waterway in Qikiqtaaluk, Nunavut, Canada

- Location within Nunavut
- Coordinates: 75°15′N 097°30′W
- Basin countries: Canada
- Settlements: Uninhabited

McDougall Sound is an Arctic waterway in Qikiqtaaluk, Nunavut, Canada. It is located between southeastern Bathurst Island and western Cornwallis island. The sound's southern mouth opens to the Parry Channel, and beyond that, to the Barrow Strait. The sound's northern mouth opens to Crozier Strait. The sound is populated by several smaller islands, the named ones including Milne Island, Little Cornwallis Island, Wood Island, Neal Islands, Truro Island, and Baker Island.

McDougall Sound is the namesake of George F. McDougall who explored the sound in 1851 while wintering with Capt. Horatio Austin's search team seeking the lost Franklin Expedition.

== Fauna ==
The sound is home to bearded seal. Atlantic walrus (O. rosmarus rosmarus) have also been charted as far west as McDougall Sound.

== Ethnography ==
In his 1990 study of Paleo-Eskimo people (who preceded the Inuit), Helmer describes three occupation periods in the McDougall Sound region: Transitional Period Dorset (ca. 3000 BP), Early Dorset (2500—2200 BP), and Late Dorset (ca. 1500—1000 BP), demonstrating abrupt ends to three sets of occupations by Palaeo-Eskimo hunters. The University of Calgary's McDougall Sound Arctic Research Project continued this work.
