= Little Cornwallis Island =

Uninhabited island in the Arctic Archipelago

Little Cornwallis
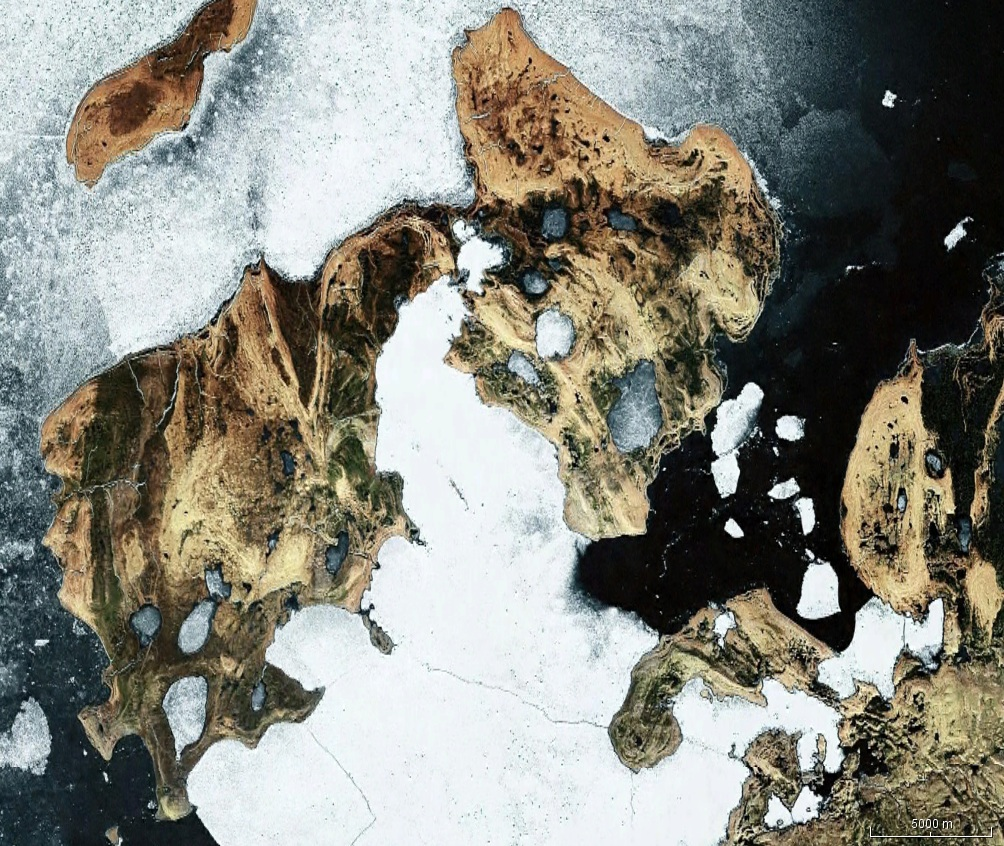
- Satellite view

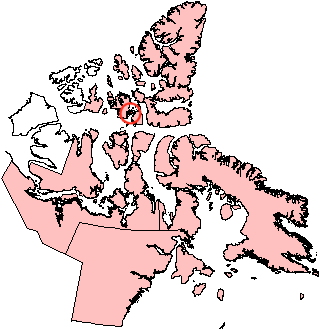
- Little Cornwallis Island, Nunavut

- Location within Nunavut Location within Canada

Geography
- Location: McDougall Sound
- Coordinates: 75°30′N 096°30′W
- Archipelago: Queen Elizabeth Islands; Arctic Archipelago
- Area: 412 km^{2} (159 sq mi)
- Length: 36 km (22.4 mi)
- Width: 32 km (19.9 mi)

Administration
- Canada
- Nunavut: Nunavut
- Region: Qikiqtaaluk

Demographics
- Population: 0
- Ethnic groups: Inuit

Little Cornwallis Island is one of the Queen Elizabeth Islands in the Canadian Arctic islands in Nunavut, Canada. It is located at 75°30'N 96°30'W, between Cornwallis Island and Bathurst Island in McDougall Sound, and measures 412 km^{2} (159 sq mi). It is uninhabited.

Little Cornwallis Island was the home to Polaris Mine, the most poleward base-metal mine in the world. In 1960 a vast concentration of zinc and lead was discovered on the island during mapping for oil permits. Cominco acquired land in the area and a gravity survey in 1970 detected a large anomaly. By 1973 surface drilling and underground development had outlined the Polaris ore body and defined reserves of about 25 million tons grading approximately 14% zinc and 4% lead. A mining facility was constructed on a barge at Trois-Rivières, Quebec and towed to the island; arriving in mid August 1981. Production commenced in 1982. The mile-long gravel runway allowed aircraft as large as the Boeing 727 and Boeing 737 to service the mine. The mine was closed in August 2002 as forecast due to depletion of the ore body. From 1982 to 2002 the mine processed 21 million tons of ore grading 3.72% lead and 15.81% zinc, producing 733,800 tons of lead metal and 2.8 million tons of zinc metal in concentrate. A two-year, $53 million decommissioning and reclamation program was completed in September 2004.

During the operating lifetime of the mine, there was a company-owned camp to provide lodgings to miners, and the community and mine was serviced by Bell Canada and then by Northwestel.
