= Cornwallis Island (Nunavut) =

Island in northern Canada

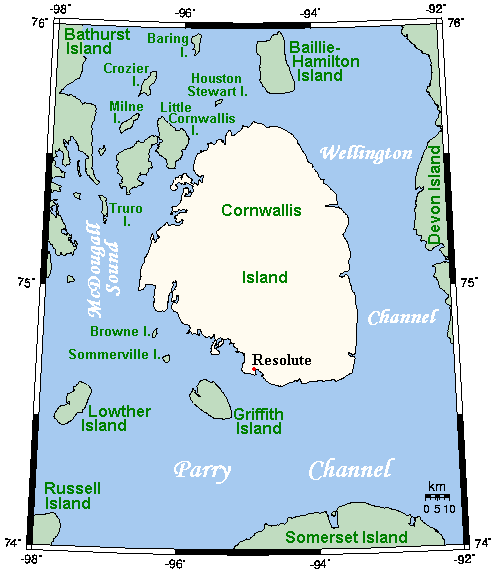
- Closeup of Cornwallis Island

- Location within Nunavut Location within Canada

Geography
- Location: Northern Canada
- Coordinates: 75°08′N 95°00′W
- Archipelago: Queen Elizabeth Islands; Arctic Archipelago
- Area: 7,070.11 km^{2} (2,729.78 sq mi) (2026)
- Area rank: 21st in Canada & 96th worldwide
- Length: 113 km (70.2 mi)
- Width: 95 km (59 mi)
- Highest elevation: 359 m (1178 ft)
- Highest point: Unnamed High Point

Administration
- Canada
- Territory: Nunavut
- Largest settlement: Resolute (pop. 183)

Demographics
- Population: 183 (2021)
- Pop. density: 0.026/km^{2} (0.067/sq mi)

Cornwallis Island is one of the Queen Elizabeth Islands, part of the Arctic Archipelago, in the Qikiqtaaluk Region of Nunavut in the Canadian Arctic. It lies to the west of Devon Island, the largest uninhabited island in the world, and at its greatest length is about 113 km (70 mi). At 7,070.11 km^{2} (2,729.78 sq mi) in size, it is the 96th largest island in the world, and Canada's 21st largest island. Cornwallis Island is separated by the Wellington Channel from Devon Island, and by the Parry Channel from Somerset Island to the south. Northwest of Cornwallis Island lies Little Cornwallis Island, the biggest of a group of small islands at the north end of McDougall Sound, which separates Cornwallis Island from nearby Bathurst Island.

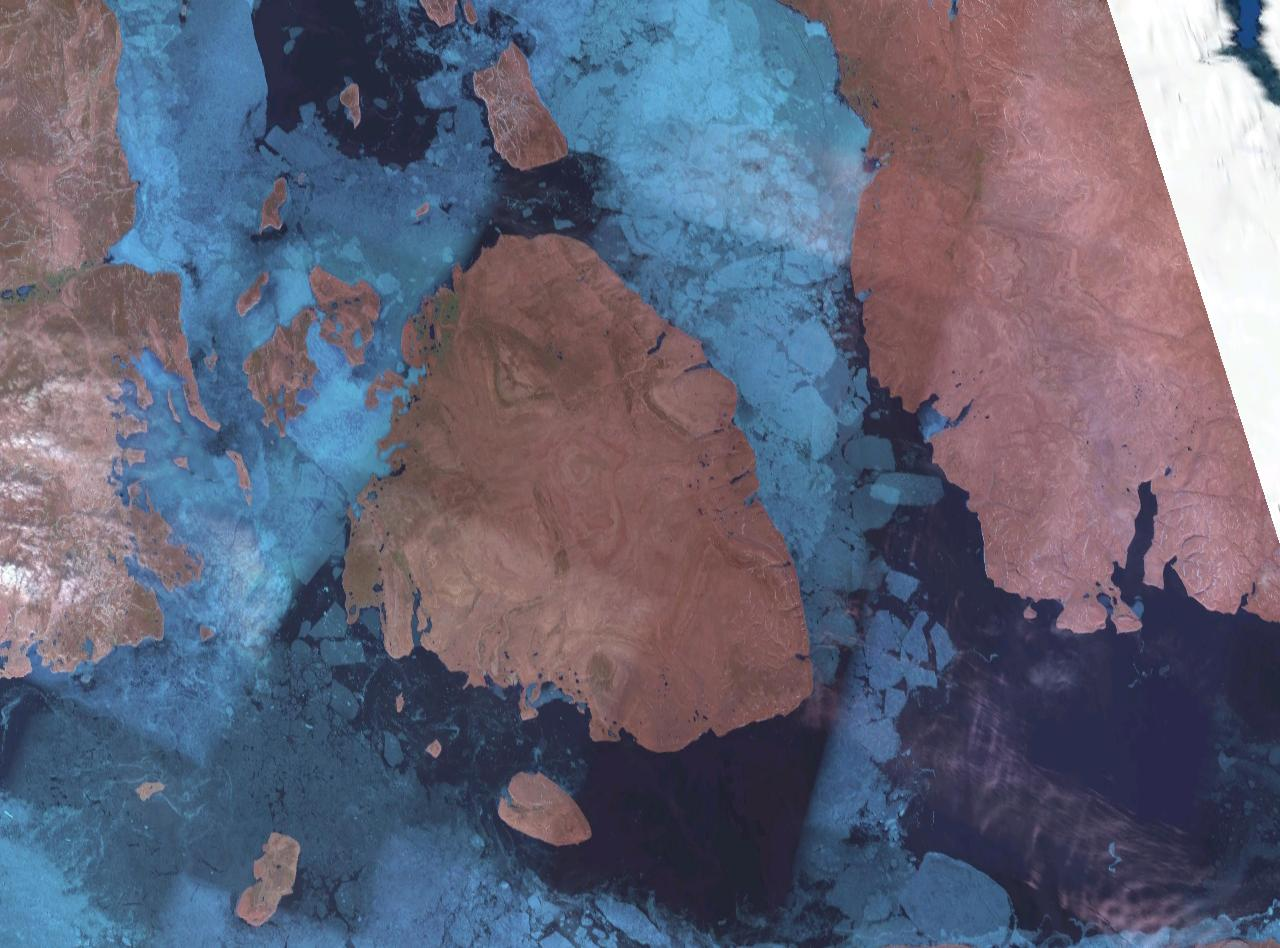
NASA Landsat photo of Cornwallis Island

Cape Airy is located at the island's southwestern extremity. Also on the southwestern coast, Griffith Island lies directly across from the island's only hamlet, Resolute (Qausuittuq), separated by the 10.5 km (6.5 mi) wide Resolute Passage. The first European to visit Cornwallis Island was the British Arctic explorer and naval officer Sir William Edward Parry in 1819. The island is named for Royal Navy admiral Sir William Cornwallis. Cornwallis Island is also home to microbiological colonies known as hypoliths, from their tendency to take hold under ("hypo") stones ("lith"). Several sites on Cornwallis Island including Char Lake and Meretta Lake were key research locations in the International Biological Program and proved foundational to the development of high-latitude limnology.

== Demographics ==
Resolute is Canada's second most northerly public community, after Grise Fiord, and has a population of 183 in 2021. Resolute Bay Airport acts as a transportation hub for the central islands of the high Arctic of Nunavut.

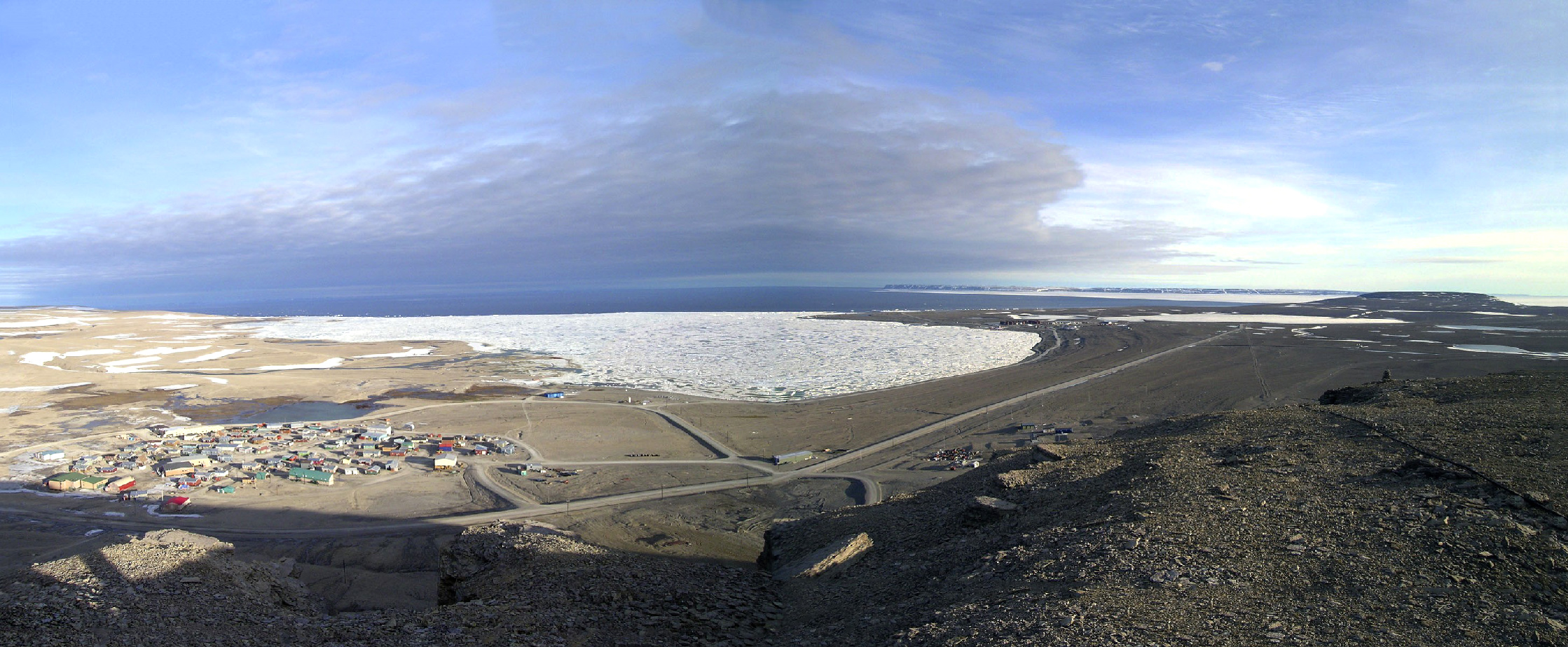
Resolute area, 2004

== Climate ==
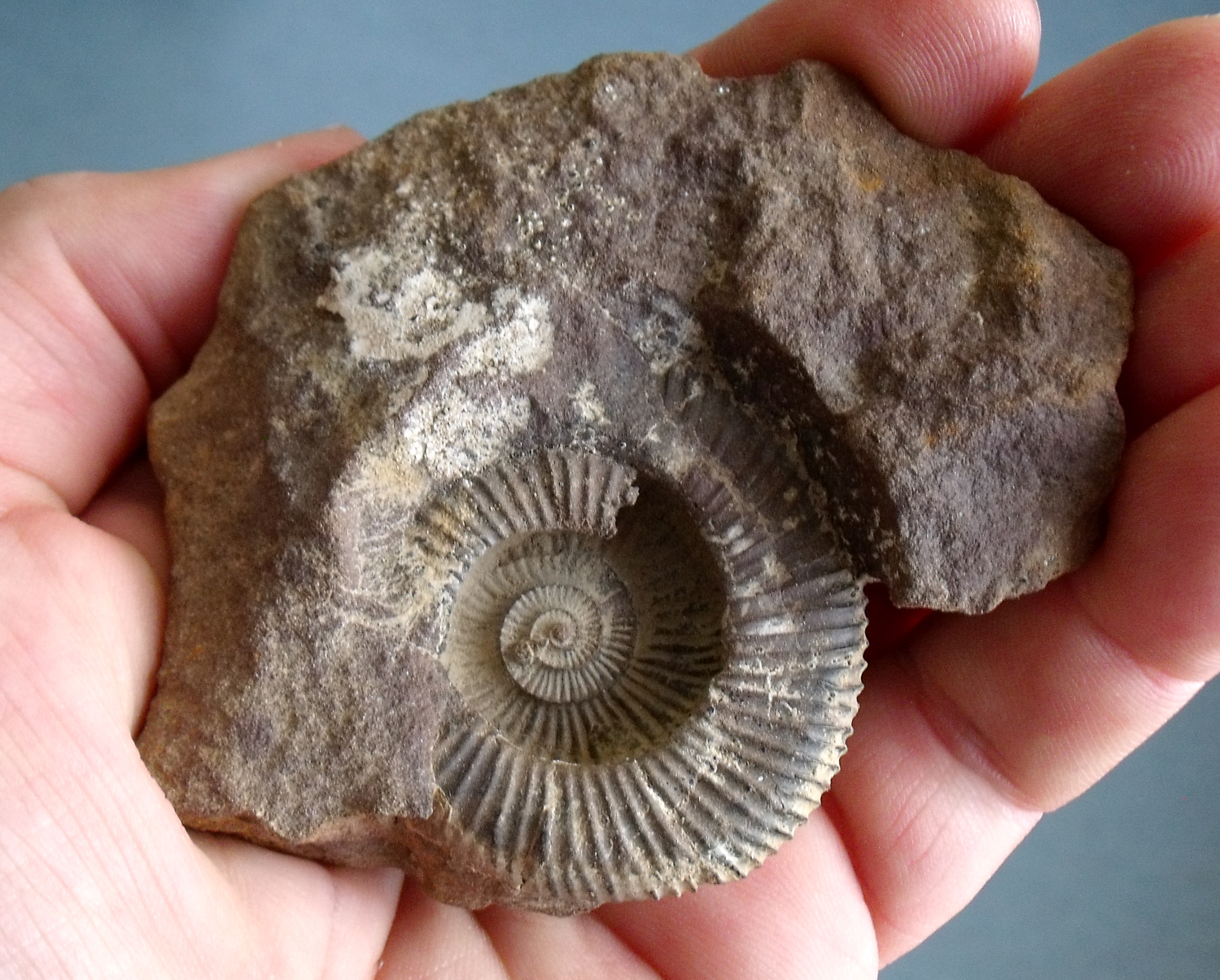
Cornwallis Island in its entirety is an exposure of Paleozoic rocks. Specimen seen in the display at the Hamlet office, Resolute Bay

The island has a polar arctic climate (ET) with long cold winters and short cool summers. Resolute, which lies on the south coast of the island, has an annual average temperature of −15.1 °C (4.8 °F), with an average high for the year of −12.2 °C (10.0 °F) and the average low for the year is −17.9 °C (−0.2 °F). Resolute has a very dry climate with an average precipitation of 164.1 mm (6.46 in) a year, most of it falling as snow from September to November. The record high for Resolute is 20.1 °C (68.2 °F) on July 2, 2012, and the record low for Resolute is −52.2 °C (−62.0 °F) on January 7, 1966. Resolute has never experienced an above-freezing temperature between October 20 and May 6. Between around April 30 and August 13, Resolute experiences midnight sun; whilst between around November 7 and February 4 there is polar night. Between late November and mid-January, the sun is so low that there is not even civil twilight, with the only exception from complete darkness being a deeper-blue sky called nautical twilight at noon, but there is no true experience of 24 hours of pitch black darkness around noon. For about two weeks before and after the midnight sun in Resolute, the nights are still quite bright since it does not get any darker than civil twilight (this is the twilight where surrounding objects are still visible and outdoor activities can go on without the need for artificial lighting). Resolute, however, does not experience night (the phase of day) from about March 14 to September 29. Resolute does experience thunderstorms during the summer, but they are typically rare in the region.

Climate data for Resolute (Resolute Bay Airport / Resolute CARS) WMO ID: 71924; coordinates 74°43′01″N 94°58′10″W; elevation: 67.7 m (222 ft); 1991–2020 normals, extremes 1947–present (Note: Composite data from Resolute CS: WMO ID: 71018; coordinates 74°42′57″N 94°58′59″W; elevation: 30.0 m (98.4 ft). Sun from 1981–2010 data)
Month	Jan	Feb	Mar	Apr	May	Jun	Jul	Aug	Sep	Oct	Nov	Dec	Year
Record high humidex	−0.8	−3.9	−2.8	0.0	5.6	18.8	20.4	15.0	8.9	1.4	−2.8	−4.1	20.4
Record high °C (°F)	−0.8 (30.6)	−3.9 (25.0)	−2.7 (27.1)	0.0 (32.0)	6.1 (43.0)	18.3 (64.9)	20.1 (68.2)	15.3 (59.5)	9.4 (48.9)	2.0 (35.6)	−2.8 (27.0)	−3.6 (25.5)	20.1 (68.2)
Mean daily maximum °C (°F)	−28.0 (−18.4)	−28.8 (−19.8)	−26.0 (−14.8)	−17.7 (0.1)	−7.2 (19.0)	2.8 (37.0)	7.7 (45.9)	4.6 (40.3)	−1.7 (28.9)	−9.4 (15.1)	−18.3 (−0.9)	−23.8 (−10.8)	−12.2 (10.0)
Daily mean °C (°F)	−31.4 (−24.5)	−32.1 (−25.8)	−29.4 (−20.9)	−21.2 (−6.2)	−10.1 (13.8)	0.5 (32.9)	4.9 (40.8)	2.4 (36.3)	−3.7 (25.3)	−12.2 (10.0)	−21.5 (−6.7)	−27.3 (−17.1)	−15.1 (4.8)
Mean daily minimum °C (°F)	−34.6 (−30.3)	−35.3 (−31.5)	−32.8 (−27.0)	−24.6 (−12.3)	−12.9 (8.8)	−1.7 (28.9)	2.0 (35.6)	0.2 (32.4)	−5.6 (21.9)	−15.0 (5.0)	−24.4 (−11.9)	−30.6 (−23.1)	−17.9 (−0.2)
Record low °C (°F)	−52.2 (−62.0)	−52.0 (−61.6)	−51.7 (−61.1)	−42.1 (−43.8)	−29.4 (−20.9)	−16.7 (1.9)	−3.1 (26.4)	−9.3 (15.3)	−20.6 (−5.1)	−37.3 (−35.1)	−42.8 (−45.0)	−46.1 (−51.0)	−52.2 (−62.0)
Record low wind chill	−72.0	−69.6	−69.9	−60.5	−41.5	−27.1	−9.8	−17.1	−32.4	−57.1	−60.3	−63.8	−72.0
Average precipitation mm (inches)	4.9 (0.19)	4.4 (0.17)	7.4 (0.29)	8.3 (0.33)	8.6 (0.34)	15.7 (0.62)	29.3 (1.15)	32.6 (1.28)	19.0 (0.75)	15.1 (0.59)	12.0 (0.47)	6.7 (0.26)	164.1 (6.46)
Average rainfall mm (inches)	0.0 (0.0)	0.0 (0.0)	0.0 (0.0)	0.1 (0.00)	0.6 (0.02)	8.9 (0.35)	25.1 (0.99)	22.1 (0.87)	3.7 (0.15)	0.1 (0.00)	0.0 (0.0)	0.0 (0.0)	60.5 (2.38)
Average snowfall cm (inches)	5.2 (2.0)	4.3 (1.7)	7.4 (2.9)	6.3 (2.5)	8.9 (3.5)	7.4 (2.9)	3.4 (1.3)	8.0 (3.1)	16.2 (6.4)	18.4 (7.2)	12.7 (5.0)	7.1 (2.8)	105.3 (41.5)
Average precipitation days (≥ 0.2 mm)	7.2	6.9	8.5	7.2	8.5	7.8	11.1	13.7	12.4	13.1	11.0	8.3	115.6
Average rainy days (≥ 0.2 mm)	0.0	0.0	0.0	0.04	0.44	4.1	9.8	8.6	2.1	0.25	0.0	0.0	25.4
Average snowy days (≥ 0.2 cm)	6.9	6.6	7.9	6.5	8.1	5.2	2.4	6.0	11.0	13.3	10.6	8.1	92.5
Average relative humidity (%) (at 1500 LST)	66.0	65.5	66.7	69.6	80.8	83.1	80.5	85.2	87.8	84.7	73.8	68.1	76.0
Mean monthly sunshine hours	—	—	132.2	291.7	307.9	298.1	299.4	138.4	58.9	30.3	0.7	—	—
Percentage possible sunshine	—	—	37.2	53.6	41.4	41.4	40.2	20.8	14.0	12.4	3.8	—	—
Source: Environment and Climate Change Canada (sun 1981–2010)
