= List of shipwrecks in November 1824 =

List of shipwrecks in November 1824 includes some ships sunk, foundered, grounded, or otherwise lost during November 1824.

== 1 November ==
List of shipwrecks: 1 November 1824
Ship	State	Description
Ocean	United Kingdom	The ship sank on the Cross Sand, in the North Sea off Lowestoft, Suffolk. Her crew were rescued.

== 2 November ==
List of shipwrecks: 2 November 1824
Ship	State	Description
Albion	United Kingdom	The ship was wrecked near Dunbar, Lothian. Her crew were rescued. She was on a voyage from Berwick upon Tweed, Northumberland to Grangemouth, Stirlingshire.
Antrim	United Kingdom	The ship was driven ashore at Ayr. She was on a voyage from Glasgow, Renfrewshire to Belfast, County Antrim
Aurora	Netherlands	The ship was driven ashore on the Zuidwall. She was on a voyage from St. Jago de Cuba, Cuba to Amsterdam, North Holland. Aurora was refloated in mid-November and taken in to the Nieuw Diep.
Brenton	United Kingdom	The ship was driven ashore and wrecked 4 nautical miles (7.4 km) west of Ostend, West Flanders, Netherlands. Her crew were rescued. She was on a voyage from Sunderland, County Durham to Margate, Kent.
Dunmore	United Kingdom	The sloop was scuttled near Killybegs, County Donegal, her captain having sold her cargo of 100 firkins of butter and absconded with the proceeds. She was on a voyage from Sligo to Liverpool, Lancashire.
Fortune	United Kingdom	The ship foundered in the North Sea off the Dudgeon Lightship ( Trinity House) with the loss of four of her crew. She was on a voyage from St. David's, Pembrokeshire to London.
Friendship	United Kingdom	The ship was wrecked near Dunbar. Her crew were rescued. She was on a voyage from Berwick-upon-Tweed to Grangemouth.
John	United Kingdom	The ship foundered off the Blasquets with the loss of two of her crew. She was on avoyage from Fraserburgh, Aberdeenshire to Cork.
Joseph & Ann	United Kingdom	The ship departed from Cuxhaven for London. No further trace, presumed foundered in the North Sea with the loss of all hands.
Neptune	Stettin	The ship was driven ashore near "Skanaer". She was on a voyage from Stettin to London.
Osborn	United Kingdom	The ship departed from Danzig for Aberdeen. No further trace, presumed foundered with the loss of all hands.

== 3 November ==
List of shipwrecks: 3 November 1824
Ship	State	Description
Ann	United Kingdom	The ship was driven ashore and wrecked at Memel, Prussia. Her crew were rescued.
Caius	United Kingdom	The ship was driven ashore and sank near Bovenbergen, Denmark. She was on a voyage from Hull, Yorkshire to Memel.
Catharina Margareta	Rostock	The ship was driven ashore and wrecked at Tönningen, Duchy of Holstein.
Eenigkeit	Flag unknown	The ship was driven ashore at Tönningen.
Emanuel	Flag unknown	The ship was driven ashore at Tönningen.
Endymion	United Kingdom	The ship was wrecked west of Skagen, Denmark. Her crew were rescued. She was on a voyage from Saint Petersburg, Russia to Hull.
Flora	Flag unknown	The ship was wrecked near "Waarde", Jutland with the loss of one life.
Jong Gerrat	Netherlands	The ship was lost near Toolse, Russia. Her crew were rescued. She was on a voyage from Narva, Russia to Amsterdam, North Holland.
Neceas	Spain	The ship was wrecked on "Punta Males". She was on a voyage from Havana, Cuba to Cádiz.
Nicholas and Jane	United Kingdom	The ship was lost off Götaland, Sweden. Her crew were rescued. She was on a voyage from Saint Petersburg, Russia, to Bristol, Gloucestershire.
Pilgrim	United Kingdom	The ship was lost off Götaland. Her crew were rescued. She was on a voyage from Saint Petersburg to Hull, Yorkshire.
Start Lübeck	Lübeck	The ship was wrecked on the Dragoe Sand Reef, off the coast of Denmark. She was on a voyage from Lübeck to London, United Kingdom.
Walker	United Kingdom	The ship was driven ashore and wrecked at Memel. Her crew were rescued.
Wallace Edkin	United Kingdom	The ship was wrecked at Southport, Lancashire. She was on a voyage from Miramichi, New Brunswick, British North America to Whitehaven, Cumberland.
William and John	United States	The ship was wrecked on Vlieland, Friesland, Netherlands with the loss of all but one of her crew. She was on a voyage from New York to Harlingen, Friesland.

== 4 November ==
List of shipwrecks: 4 November 1824
Ship	State	Description
Framlingen	(Russian Empire) Grand Duchy of Finland	The ship was lost off Christiansø, Denmark with the loss of three of her crew. She was on a voyage from Oulu to Lisbon, Portugal.
Harmony	United Kingdom	The ship was abandoned in the North Sea. Her crew were rescued by Benjamin and Mary (United Kingdom). She was on a voyage from Hull, Yorkshire to Memel, Prussia.
Isabella	United Kingdom	The ship was abandoned in the North Sea. Her crew were rescued.
Jonge Elizabeth	Denmark	The ship was driven ashore on the coast of Jutland. She was on a voyage from Newcastle upon Tyne, Northumberland, United Kingdom to Copenhagen.
Jubilee	United Kingdom	The ship was abandoned in the North Sea. Her crew were rescued by Doris (United Kingdom). Jubilee was towed in to Zierikzee, Zeeland, Netherlands in early November.
Rachel	United Kingdom	The ship foundered in the Dogger Bank. Her crew were rescued by Ino (United Kingdom). Rachel was on a voyage from "Wyburg" to Hull.
Victory	United Kingdom	The ship was driven ashore at Callantsoog, North Holland, Netherlands.

== 5 November ==
List of shipwrecks: 5 November 1824
Ship	State	Description
Boa Limbranca	Portugal	The ship was driven ashore near Glückstadt, Duchy of Holstein. She was on a voyage from Hamburg to Madeira. Boa Limbranca had been refloated by 19 November.
Catharina	Sweden	The ship was driven ashore near "Waarde", Jutland. Her crew were rescued. She was on a voyage from Bordeaux, Gironde, France to Stockholm.
Charlotte	(United Kingdom of Great Britain and Ireland) British North America	The ship was wrecked in the Saint Lawrence River. Her crew were rescued. She was on a voyage from Newfoundland to Quebec City, Lower Canada.
Dido	United Kingdom	The brig was wrecked at Seaham, County Durham. Her crew were rescued. A Newfoundland dog assisted in the rescue by swimming out to the ship with a rope.
Henrietta	Hamburg	The ship was lost near Cuxhaven. She was on a voyage from Hamburg to Amsterdam, North Holland, Netherlands.
Jemima	United Kingdom	The ship sank in the River Orwell. She was later refloated and returned to service, departing from Harwich, Essex for London on 16 November.
Mary Ann	United Kingdom	The ship was driven ashore in the Scheldt between "Batz" and Lillo, Antwerp, United Kingdom of the Netherlands. She was on a voyage from Matanzas, Cuba to Antwerp.

== 6 November ==
List of shipwrecks: 6 November 1824
Ship	State	Description
Earl of Belfast	United Kingdom	The ship foundered in the Irish Sea. She was on a voyage from Dublin to Liverpool, Lancashire.
Harlequin	United Kingdom	The ship was driven ashore on Green Island, British North America.
Leonora	Russia	The ship was wrecked in Åland. She was on a voyage from Kunda to Bordeaux, Gironde, France.
Sisters	United Kingdom	The ship capsized at Ilfracombe, Devon and was severely damaged. She was on a voyage from Bristol, Gloucestershire to Falmouth, Cornwall.
Union	United Kingdom	The ship was driven ashore and wrecked on the Île d'Orleans, Lower Canada, British North America.
Victoire	(United Kingdom of Great Britain and Ireland) British North America	The schooner was wrecked at Point St. Valier. She was on a voyage from Halifax, Nova Scotia to Quebec City, Lower Canada.

== 7 November ==
List of shipwrecks: 7 November 1824
Ship	State	Description
Ajax	Imperial Russian Navy	The brig was damaged in a storm at Kronstadt.
Aleksandr Nevskii	Imperial Russian Navy	The Provornyi-class frigate was damaged in a storm at Kronstadt.
Amfitrida	Imperial Russian Navy	The Amfitrida-class frigate was damaged in a storm at Kronstadt.
Ann	United Kingdom	The ship was lost at the mouth of the Eider. She was on a voyage from Sunderland, County Durham to Hamburg.
Apollon	Imperial Russian Navy	The sloop-of-war was damaged in a storm at Kronstadt.
Apollon	Imperial Russian Navy	The sloop-of war was damaged in a storm at Kronstadt.
Argus	Imperial Russian Navy	The Amfitrida-class frigate was damaged in a storm at Kronstadt.
Arkhipelag	Imperial Russian Navy	The Amfitrida-class frigate was damaged in a storm at Kronstadt.
Arsis	Imperial Russian Navy	The Selafail-class ship of the line was damaged in a storm at Kronstadt.
Avtroil	Imperial Russian Navy	The Amfitrida-class frigate was damaged in a storm at Kronstadt.
Badajos	United Kingdom	The ship ran aground in the "Hever".
Berlin	Imperial Russian Navy	The Selafail-class ship of the line was damaged in a storm at Kronstadt.
Bodry	Imperial Russian Navy	The ship was damaged in a storm at Kronstadt.
Borei	Imperial Russian Navy	The Selafail-class ship of the line was damaged in a storm at Kronstadt.
Brothers	United Kingdom	The ship ran aground in the "Hever".
Bystriy	Imperial Russian Navy	The Speshnyi-class frigate was damaged in a storm at Kronstadt.
Commerstraks	Imperial Russian Navy	The brig was damaged in a storm at Kronstadt.
Russian ship Diana (1818)	Imperial Russian Navy	The Amfitrida-class frigate was damaged in a storm at Kronstadt. She was later repaired and returned to service.
Emgeiten	Imperial Russian Navy	The Leiptzic-class ship of the line was damaged in a storm at Kronstadt.
Eol	Imperial Russian Navy	The ship was damaged in a storm at Kronstadt.
Filadelfia	Imperial Russian Navy	The ship was driven into by Leiptzig and Leto (both Royal Navy) and damaged in a storm at Kronstadt.
Finland	Imperial Russian Navy	The Trekh Sviatitelei-class ship of the line was damaged in a storm at Kronstadt.
Gamburg	Imperial Russian Navy	The Selafail-class ship of the line was damaged in a storm at Kronstadt.
'Gektor	Imperial Russian Navy	The Provornyi-class frigate was damaged in a storm at Kronstadt.
Grokhot	Imperial Russian Navy	The corvette was damaged in a storm at Kronstadt.
Gustaf Adolf	Imperial Russian Navy	The transport ship was damaged in a storm at Kronstadt.
Ida	Imperial Russian Navy	The brig was damaged in a storm at Kronstadt.
Iserber	Imperial Russian Navy	The lugger was damaged in a storm at Kronstadt.
Iovkost	Imperial Russian Navy	The frigate was damaged in a storm at Kronstadt.
Iovkost	Imperial Russian Navy	The frigate was damaged in a storm at Kronstadt.
Iupiter	Imperial Russian Navy	The Trekh-Sviatitelei-class ship of the line was damaged in a storm at Kronstadt.
Kadyak	Imperial Russian Navy	The brig was damaged in a storm at Kronstadt.
Kaledoniya	Imperial Russian Navy	The transport ship was damaged in a storm at Kronstadt.
Kamchatka	Imperial Russian Navy	The sloop-of-war was damaged in a storm at Kronstadt.
Katsbach	Imperial Russian Navy	The Selafail-class ship of the line was damaged in a storm at Kronstadt.
Khemman	Imperial Russian Navy	The schooner was damaged in a storm at Kronstadt.
Khrabriy	Imperial Russian Navy	The Selafail-class ship of the line was damaged in a storm at Kronstadt.
Kriket	Imperial Russian Navy	The tender was damaged in a storm at Kronstadt.
Ladoga	Imperial Russian Navy	The sloop-of-war was damaged in a storm at Kronstadt.
Ladoga	Imperial Russian Navy	The sloop-of-war was damaged in a storm at Kronstadt.
Laurentiy	Imperial Russian Navy	The brig was damaged in a storm at Kronstadt.
Leiptzig	Imperial Russian Navy	Floods in Saint Petersburg: The Leiptzig-class ship of the line was driven into Filadelfia and Vostock (both Imperial Russian Navy) and damaged in floods at Kronstadt. She was refloated in December 1824 but was subsequently hulked.
Leto	Imperial Russian Navy	The transport ship was damaged in a storm at Kronstadt.
Meri	Imperial Russian Navy	The transport ship was damaged in a storm at Kronstadt.
Ne Tron Menia	Imperial Russian Navy	The Selafail-class ship of the line was damaged in a storm at Kronstadt.
Olimp	Imperial Russian Navy	The brig was damaged in a storm at Kronstadt.
Patrikii	Imperial Russian Navy	The Speshnyi-class frigate was damaged in a storm at Kronstadt.
Pegas	Imperial Russian Navy	The ship was damaged in a storm at Kronstadt.
Piotr	Imperial Russian Navy	The Trekh Sviatitelei-class ship of the line was damaged in a storm at Kronstadt.
Pollux	Imperial Russian Navy	The frigater was damaged in a storm at Kronstadt.
Russian ship Pomoschnyi (1821)	Imperial Russian Navy	The Pomona-class frigate was damaged in a storm at Kronstadt. She was later repaired and returned to service.
Prints Gustav	Imperial Russian Navy	The Selafail-class ship of the line was damaged in a storm at Kronstadt.
Prokhor	Imperial Russian Navy	The Selafail-class ship of the line was driven into Vostock (Imperial Russian Navy), drove ashore and was damaged in a storm at Kronstadt.
Provornyi	Imperial Russian Navy	The Speshnyi-class frigate was damaged in a storm at Kronstadt.
Raduga	Imperial Russian Navy	The schooner was damaged in a storm at Kronstadt.
Retvizan	Imperial Russian Navy	The Selafail-class ship of the line was damaged in a storm at Kronstadt.
Rostislav	Imperial Russian Navy	The Slava Rossii-class ship of the line was damaged in a storm at Kronstadt.
Seliger	Imperial Russian Navy	The yacht was damaged in a storm at Kronstadt.
Severnaya Zvezda	Imperial Russian Navy	The Selafail-class ship of the line was damaged in a storm at Kronstadt.
Sveaborg	Imperial Russian Navy	The Kastor-class frigate was damaged in a storm at Kronstadt.
Svyatoslav	Imperial Russian Navy	The battleship was damaged in a storm at Kronstadt.
Sysoi Velikii	Imperial Russian Navy	The Selafail-class ship of the line was damaged in a storm at Kronstadt.
Tri Ierarkha	Imperial Russian Navy	The battleship was damaged in a storm at Kronstadt.
Tri Sviatitelia	Imperial Russian Navy	The battleship was damaed in a storm at Kronstadt.
Tviordyi	Imperial Russian Navy	The Leiptzig-class ship of the line was damaged in a storm at Kronstadt.
Ural	Imperial Russian Navy	The transport ship was damaged in a storm at Kronstadt.
Vershcampenoise	Imperial Russian Navy	The battleship was damaged in a storm at Kronstadt.
Vesna	Imperial Russian Navy	The transport ship was damaged in a storm at Kronstadt.
Vestovoi	Imperial Russian Navy	The Speshnyi-class frigate was damaged in a storm at Kronstadt.
Vostok	Imperial Russian Navy	The sloop of war was driven into by Leiptzig and Prokhor (both Imperial Russian Navy) and was severely damaged in a storm at Kronstadt.
Vrow Catharina	Heligoland	The ship was driven ashore on Düne.
William and Ann	United Kingdom	The ship departed from Banff, Aberdeenshire for London. No further trace, presumed foundered in the North Sea with the loss of all hands.
Wind-Hound	Imperial Russian Navy	The Provornyi-class frigate was damaged in a storm at Kronstadt.
Yanus	Imperial Russian Navy	The boat was damaged in a storm at Kronstadt.
No. 5	Imperial Russian Navy	The deck boat was damaged in a storm at Kronstadt.
No. 7	Imperial Russian Navy	The deck boat was driven ashore and damaged in a storm at Kronstadt.
No. 10	Imperial Russian Navy	The deck boat was damaged in a storm at Kronstadt.
No. 11	Imperial Russian Navy	The schooner was damaged in a storm at Kronstadt.

== 8 November ==
List of shipwrecks: 8 November 1824
Ship	State	Description
Hazard	(United Kingdom of Great Britain and Ireland) Jersey	The ship was wrecked on Noirmont Point, Jersey. She was on a voyage from Jersey to London.
James	United Kingdom	The ship was wrecked in the Magdalen Islands, British North America with the loss of three of her crew. She was on a voyage from Miramichi, New Brunswick, British North America to Liverpool, Lancashire.

== 9 November ==
List of shipwrecks: 9 November 1824
Ship	State	Description
Heart of Oak	United Kingdom	The ship was driven ashore 1 nautical mile (1.9 km) west of Littlehampton, Sussex.
Hero	United Kingdom	The brig foundered in the Atlantic Ocean. She was on a voyage from Liverpool, Lancashire to Bahia, Brazil.
John	United Kingdom	The ship was driven ashore at East Preston, Sussex. She was on a voyage from London to Jamaica. John was later refloated and towed in to Cowes, Isle of Wight.

== 10 November ==
List of shipwrecks: 10 November 1824
Ship	State	Description
Dorothy	United Kingdom	The ship was wrecked at Domesnes, Norway with the loss of six of her fourteen crew. She was on a voyage from Riga, Russia to Hull, Yorkshire.

== 11 November ==
List of shipwrecks: 11 November 1824
Ship	State	Description
Dantzig	Danzig	The ship was lost off the mouth of the Eider with the loss of four of her crew. She was on a voyage from London, United Kingdom.
Thomas & Mary	United Kingdom	The ship was driven ashore on Amrum, Duchy of Schleswig. She was on a voyage from Hamburg to Husum, Kingdom of Hanover and London.
William	United Kingdom	The ship was driven ashore at Garton, Yorkshire. She was later refloated and taken in to Bridlington, Yorkshire.

== 12 November ==
List of shipwrecks: 12 November 1824
Ship	State	Description
Alert	United Kingdom	The ship departed from Seville, Spain for London. No further trace, presumed foundered with the loss of all hands.
Elizabeth	United Kingdom	The ship was driven ashore at Nieuwpoort, West Flanders, Netherlands. She was on a voyage from Guernsey, Channel Islands to the Shetland Islands.
Juno	United Kingdom	The ship was wrecked on Cape Breton Island, British North America. Her crew were rescued.
Montesquien	United States	The ship was driven ashore and wrecked on Goree, Zeeland, Netherlands. At least fourteen of her crew were rescued.
Victor	Netherlands	The ship ran aground in the Scheldt. She was on a voyage from Santos, Brazil to Antwerp. Victor was refloated on or about 22 November and taken in to Antwerp.

== 13 November ==
List of shipwrecks: 13 November 1824
Ship	State	Description
Ann & Margaret	United Kingdom	The smack was wrecked in the River Lune. Her crew were rescued.
Dundee	United Kingdom	The whaler was driven ashore at Lerwick, Shetland Islands. She was on a voyage from the Davis Strait to London. Dundee was refloated on 15 November.
Glenely	United Kingdom	The smack foundered off Stornoway with the loss of all seven people on board.
Helena Charlotte	Denmark	The ship was driven ashore on Mandø. Her crew were rescued. She was on a voyage from Randers to London.
Jane & Mary	United Kingdom	The ship was driven ashore in Bootle Bay. She was on a voyage from Dublin to Liverpool, Lancashire. Jane & Mary was later refloated.
Maria	Duchy of Holstein	The ship was driven ashore between Bovenbergen and "Holmes", Denmark, where she was wrecked on 15 November. She was on a voyage from Flensburg to Hull, Yorkshire, United Kingdom.
St. Lawrence	United Kingdom	The ship was driven ashore in Loch Indaal. She was on a voyage from Grenock, Renfrewshire to Dublin.
Vrow Margaretha	Netherlands	The ship was driven ashore on Texel, North Holland. She was on a voyage from King's Lynn, Norfolk, United Kingdom to Veendam, Groningen. Vrow Margaretha broke up on 16 November.

== 14 November ==
List of shipwrecks: 14 November 1824
Ship	State	Description
Ann	United Kingdom	The ship was wrecked off Troon, Ayrshire. Her crew were rescued. She was on a voyage from Porto, Portugal to Greenock, Renfrewshire.
Elizabeth	Stettin	The ship was driven ashore and severely damaged near Liebau, Prussia. Her crew were rescued. She was on a voyage from Cádiz, Spain to Stettin.
Forsoget	Flag unknown	The ship was driven ashore in the Clyde.
Kielseng	Duchy of Holstein	The ship was driven ashore and damaged at "Nevlinghoen", Norway. She was on a voyage from Tönningen to Saint Thomas, Virgin Islands. Kielseng was later refloated and taken in to "Lerwig", Norway for repairs.
Mercur	Stettin	The ship departed from Gravesend, Kent, United Kingdom for Stettin. No further trace, presumed foundered with the loss of all hands.
St Lawrence	United Kingdom	The ship was driven ashore in Loch Indaal. She was on a voyage from Greenock to Limerick.
William & Mary	United Kingdom	The ship founderedin the English Channel. She was on a voyage from Jersey, Channel Islands to Portsmouth, Hampshire.

== 15 November ==
List of shipwrecks: 15 November 1824
Ship	State	Description
Enigheden	Norway	The ship was wrecked on Baltrum, Kingdom of Hanover. Her crew were rescued. She was on a voyage from "Dram" to London, United Kingdom.
Gretina	France	The ship was driven ashore near Egmond aan Zee, North Holland, Netherlands with the loss of a crew member. She was on a voyage from Newcastle upon Tyne, Northumberland, United Kingdom to Rouen, Seine-Inférieure.
Julia	United Kingdom	The ship departed from Youghall, County Cork for London. No further trace, presumed foundered with the loss of all hands.
Nancy	United Kingdom	The ship was driven ashore at Great Orme Head, Caernarfonshire with the loss of three of her crew. She was on a voyage from Dublin to Liverpool, Lancashire.
Resolution	United Kingdom	The ship was driven ashore and wrecked at Pwllheli, Caernarfonshire. Her crew were rescued. She was on a voyage from Waterford to Liverpool.
Swift	United Kingdom	The ship was driven ashore at Cucq, Pas-de-Calais, France. Her crew were rescued. She was on a voyage from Cork to London.

== 16 November ==
List of shipwrecks: 16 November 1824
Ship	State	Description
Bee	United Kingdom	The ship was driven ashore in the Sound of Donaghadee. She was later refloated, but was wrecked on 23 November.
Elizabeth	United Kingdom	The ship sprang a leak and foundered in the Bay of Biscay. Her crew were rescued by William Black (United Kingdom) Elizabeth was on a voyage from Plymouth, Devon to Lisbon, Portugal.
Frau Engelsted	Duchy of Holstein	The sloop was wrecked on Eierland, North Holland, Netherlands.
Goede Welvaart	Netherlands	The ship was driven ashore on the south coast of Texel, North Holland.
Greenhow	United Kingdom	The ship ran aground between Green Island and the coast of County Down. She was on a voyage from Newry, County Antrim to Charleston, South Carolina, United States.
Marquis of Wellington	United Kingdom	The ship foundered in the Irish Sea 12 nautical miles (22 km) north of Waterford with the loss of all 45 people on board. She was on a voyage from Liverpool, Lancashire to New Orleans, Louisiana, United States.
Mary	United Kingdom	The ship was wrecked off Texel. Her crew were rescued. She was on a voyage from Hull, Yorkshire to Rio de Janeiro, Brazil.
Melantho	United Kingdom	The ship was driven ashore and wrecked at Llandwyn Point, Caernarvonshire. Her crew were rescued, but five of their rescuers died. She was on a voyage from Dublin to Waterford. Melantho was refloated in March 1825 and beached at Beaumaris, Anglesey in a severely damaged condition.
Whitehall	United Kingdom	The ship foundered in Liverpool Bay with the loss of a crew member. She was on a voyage from Dublin to Liverpool, Lancashire.

== 17 November ==
List of shipwrecks: 17 November 1824
Ship	State	Description
Betsey	United Kingdom	The ship was wrecked at Blackwaterfoot, Isle of Arran with the loss of at least 23 lives. There were twelve survivors. She was on a voyage from Belfast, County Antrim to Glasgow, Renfrewshire.
Brothers	United Kingdom	The ship was driven ashore and sank at Harrington, Cumberland. She was on a voyage from Limerick to Greenock, Renfrewshire. Brothers was later refloated and taken in to Harrington.
Hope	United Kingdom	The ship was driven ashore at Ramsey, Isle of Man.
John Eschlin	United Kingdom	The ship struck the pier and sank at Whitehaven, Cumberland. She was on a voyage from Douglas, Isle of Man to Belfast.
Staffette	Danzig	The ship was driven ashore at Rønne, Denmark. She was on a voyage from Milford Haven, Pembrokeshire, United Kingdom to Danzig. Staffette was later refloated and taken in to Rønne.
HMS Swallow	Royal Navy	The cutter was wrecked on the Île à Vache, Haiti. Her crew were rescued, She was on a voyage from Port Royal, Jamaica to Barbados.

== 18 November ==
List of shipwrecks: 18 November 1824
Ship	State	Description
Active	United Kingdom	The ship was driven ashore at Liverpool, Lancashire. She was on a voyage from Newry, County Antrim to Liverpool.
Amity	United Kingdom	The ship was abandoned in the English Channel off Ramsgate, Kent.
Anna Juliana	Sweden	The ship was driven ashore near "Varia".
Bergetha	Sweden	The ship was driven ashore at Gothenburg. She was on a voyage from Newcastle upon Tyne, Northumberland, United Kingdom to Gothenburg.
Brothers	United Kingdom	The ship was lost in the North Sea. Her crew were rescued by Rover (United Kingdom). She was on a voyage from Wick, Caithness to Londonderry.
Camillas	Sweden	The ship was driven ashore and wrecked near Gothenburg.
Carl XIV	Sweden	The ship was driven ashore at Gothenburg. She was later refloated.
Christiana	Sweden	The ship was driven ashore and wrecked near Varberg.
Edward	United Kingdom	The ship was driven ashore at Gothenburg.
Enigheten	Sweden	The ship was driven ashore near "Varia".
Ilsabe Maria	Sweden	The ship was driven ashore near Gothenburg. She was on a voyage from Stralsund to London, United Kingdom.
Juno	(United Kingdom of Great Britain and Ireland) Jersey	The brig was driven ashore at the Birling Gap, Sussex. All seven people on board were rescued. She was on a voyage from Jersey to Leith, Lothian.
Kelso	United Kingdom	The ship was abandoned in the North Sea 20 leagues (60 nautical miles (110 km)) off Flamborough Head, Yorkshire. Her crew were rescued by Rotherham (United Kingdom).
Lalla Rookh	United Kingdom	The ship was driven ashore at Mile House, Liverpool. She was on a voyage from Macao to Liverpool. Lalla Rookh was refloated on 21 November and found to be severely hogged.
Minerva	Sweden	The ship was driven ashore near "Varia".
Mary Ann	United Kingdom	The sloop sank in the River Mersey.
Rolla	United States	The ship was driven ashore at Gothenburg. She was later refloated and put into Portsmouth, Hampshire, United Kingdom.
Sarah	United Kingdom	The ship was driven ashore at Gothenburg.
Venus	Sweden	The ship was driven ashore at Gothenburg.
Visiten	Sweden	The ship was driven ashore at Gothenburg.
Zephyr	United Kingdom	The ship was driven ashore at Gothenburg. She was late refloated and returned to service.

== 19 November ==
List of shipwrecks: 19 November 1824
Ship	State	Description
Echo	United Kingdom	The ship foundered in the Baltic Sea off the Aspö Islands, Grand Duchy of Finland.
Fairfield	United Kingdom	The ship was driven ashore near Kronstadt, Russia. She had been refloated and taken in to Kronstadt by 21 November.
Ferriby	United Kingdom	The ship was driven ashore and wrecked at Krasnaya Gorka, Russia. She was on a voyage from Saint Petersburg, Russia to London
St. Vincent	United Kingdom	The ship was driven ashore at Pärnu, Russia.

== 20 November ==
List of shipwrecks: 20 November 1824
Ship	State	Description
Kitty and Clara	United Kingdom	The ship foundered in the English Channel with the loss of all hands. She was on a voyage from Plymouth, Devon to Falmouth, Cornwall.
Mary	United Kingdom	The ship was wrecked on the "Maniconagan Shoals". Her crew were rescued. She was on a voyage from Quebec City, Lower Canada, British North America to Barbados.
Mercator	United Kingdom	The ship was driven ashore and sank at Ziemupe, Russia. She was on a voyage from Saint Petersburg, Russia to London.

== 21 November ==
List of shipwrecks: 21 November 1824
Ship	State	Description
Active	United Kingdom	The ship was wrecked on the Platter Rocks, in the Irish Sea off Holyhead, Anglesey. She was on a voyage from Liverpool, Lancashire to Newry, County Down.
Charlotte Amalia	Sweden	The ship was wrecked on Skagen, Denmark. Her crew were rescued. She was on a voyage from St. Ubes, Spain to Gothenburg.
Oscar	Norway	The ship struck the breakwater and sank at Kronstadt, Russia.
Pelagic	France	The ship was driven ashore and wrecked at Shoreham-by-Sea, Sussex, United Kingdom. She was on a voyage from Honfleur, Calvados to Shoreham-by-Sea.

== 22 November ==
List of shipwrecks: 22 November 1824
Ship	State	Description
Agnes	United Kingdom	The ship was driven ashore and wrecked in Deadman's Bay.
Caledonia	United Kingdom	The ship was driven ashore and wrecked in Deadman's Bay. She was on a voyage from Newcastle upon Tyne, Northumberland to Grenada.
Canning	United Kingdom	The ship was driven ashore in Deadman's Bay. She was later refloated.
Cato	United Kingdom	The ship was lost off the mouth of the River Exe.
City of Rochester	United Kingdom	The East Indiaman was driven ashore at Test's Bill, Devon. Her crew were rescued. She was on a voyage from London to Madras and Bengal, India.
Colonist	United Kingdom	The ship was driven ashore at Test's Bill. She was on a voyage from London to Barbados. Colonist was refloated on 8 December and taken in to Sutton Pool.
Colville	United Kingdom	The West Indiaman was driven ashore and wrecked at Fleet, Hampshire with the loss of all on board, at least seventeen lives. She was on a voyage from Demerara to London.
Concordia	Sweden	The galiot was driven ashore and wrecked in Deadman's Bay. She was on a voyage from a Finnish port to Marseille, Bouches-du-Rhône.
Cornelia	Sweden	The ship departed from Norrköping for Rouen, Seine-Inférieure, France. No further trace, presumed foundered with the loss of all hands.
Coromandel	United Kingdom	The ketch capsized off the Eddystone Lighthouse with the loss of two of her crew. She was subsequently driven ashore and wrecked at Plymouth. She was on a voyage from Faro, Portugal to The Downs.
Eliza	United Kingdom	The schooner sank in Sutton Pool, Devon.
Elizabeth	United Kingdom	The ship was driven ashore and wrecked at Prior's Haven, County Durham.
Female	United Kingdom	The brig was driven ashore and wrecked at Plymouth. She was on a voyage from London to San Sebastián, Spain.
John and Elizabeth	United Kingdom	The ship was wrecked on the Herd Sand, in the North Sea off South Shields, County Durham. She was subsequently driven ashore near South Shields.
John & Elizabeth	United Kingdom	The ship was driven ashore and wrecked at Plymouth.
Lapwing	United Kingdom	The ship was driven ashore and wrecked in Deadman's Bay. Her crew were rescued.
Louise	United Kingdom	The ship was driven ashore at Plymouth.
Loyalty	United Kingdom	The brig was wrecked in Deadman's Bay. Her crew were rescued. She was on a voyage from London to Trieste.
Margaret	United States	The ship was driven ashore and damaged at Test's Point. She was on a voyage from London to St. Ubes, Portugal. She was refloated on 24 November.
Mars	United Kingdom	The ship was lost in the English Channel off The Needles, Isle of Wight.
Mary & Elizabeth	(United Kingdom of Great Britain and Ireland) Guernsey	The ship was driven ashore between Charmouth and Lyme, Dorset. Her crew were rescued.
Mary Ellen	United Kingdom	The brig was driven ashore in Deadman's Bay. She was on a voyage from London to Gibraltar. Mary Ellen had been refloated by 28 November, but was severely damaged.
Najiaden	Hamburg	The brig was driven ashore and severely damaged in Deadman's Bay. She was on a voyage from Altona to Havana, Cuba.
Nassau	United Kingdom	The ship was driven ashore in Stonehouse Pool, Plymouth. She was later refloated.
Nelly	United Kingdom	The ship collided with Mary (United Kingdom) in the North Sea and was abandoned. Her crew were rescued by Mary. Nelly was on a voyage from Berwick upon Tweed, Northumberland to London. She subsequently came ashore at Stallingborough, Lincolnshire.
Percy	United Kingdom	The barque was driven ashore and damaged at Barbican, Plymouth. She was on a voyage from London to Madeira and Saint Vincent. Percy was later refloated and taken in to Sutton Pool.
Polly	United Kingdom	The ship was driven ashore at Plymouth.
Prince of Saxe Coburg	United Kingdom	The ship was driven ashore at Plymouth.
Regenten	Sweden	The ship was driven ashore and wrecked at Test's Hill, Devon. She was on a voyage from London to Alicante, Spain.
Retrench	United Kingdom	The brig was driven ashore and wrecked at Millbay, Plymouth. Her crew were rescued. She was on a voyage from London to Tenerife, Canary Islands and Jamaica.
Richard	United Kingdom	The full-rigged ship foundered in Deadman's Bay with the loss of a crew member. She was on a voyage from London to Demerara. rut
Ruth	United Kingdom	The ship was driven ashore and severely damaged at Plymouth. She was on a voyage from London to Jamaica. Ruth was refloated on 12 December.
Sceptre	United Kingdom	The brig was driven ashore and wrecked in Deadman's Bay. Her crew were rescued.
Scotia	United Kingdom	The barque was driven ashore and severely damaged in Deadman's Bay. She was on a voyage from London to the Cape of Good Hope. Scotia was refloated on 20 December.
Star	United Kingdom	The brig was driven ashore at Plymouth. Her crew were rescued. She was on a voyage from London to Buenos Aires, Argentina.
Two Sisters	United Kingdom	The brig was driven ashore at Plymouth with the loss of several of her crew. She was on a voyage from London to Berbice.
Welcome	United Kingdom	The ship was driven ashore near Wembury, Devon. Her crew were rescued. She was on a voyage from the Canary Islands to London. Welcome was refloated in mid-April 1825 and taken in to Plymouth.
Zephyr	United Kingdom	The brig was driven ashore at Test's Point. Her crew were rescued. She was on a voyage from Sunderland, County Durham to Porto, Portugal. Zephyr was refloated on 3 January 1825.

== 23 November ==
List of shipwrecks: 23 November 1824
Ship	State	Description
Admiral Berkeley	United Kingdom	The transport ship was driven ashore and wrecked at Portsmouth, Hampshire. All on board were rescued.
Aimable Eugene	France	The ship was driven ashore and wrecked at Brest, Finistère. She was on a voyage from Bordeaux, Gironde to Brest and Cayenne.
Albion	United Kingdom	The ship was driven ashore at Poole, Dorset. Albion had been refloated by 8 December.
Alexander	United Kingdom	The ship was driven ashore and wrecked at Kingsbridge, Devon with the loss of at least one of her crew.
Amity	United Kingdom	The ship was driven ashore and wrecked at Broadstairs, Kent. She was on a voyage from London to Penzance, Cornwall.
Anna	United Kingdom	The sloop was abandoned in the North Sea off Eyemouth, Berwickshire. Her crew survived. She was on a voyage from Perth to Newcastle upon Tyne, Northumberland.
Bee	United Kingdom	The sloop was driven ashore at Bridport, Dorset.
Belina	United Kingdom	The West Indiaman was wrecked on the Goodwin Sands, Kent with the loss of thirteen of her nineteen crew. The survivors were rescued by the lugger Sparrow (United Kingdom).
Benjamin	United Kingdom	The ship was driven ashore at Cardiff. She was on a voyage from Cardiff to Waterford. Benjamin had been refloated by 9 December and taken in to Cardiff for repairs.
Blendon	United Kingdom	The West Indiaman foundered in The Downs with the loss of twelve of her seventeen crew.
HMS Boyne	Royal Navy	The second rate ship of the line was driven ashore at Portsmouth.
HMS Captivity	Royal Navy	The prison ship was driven ashore at Portsmouth.
Christina	Sweden	The ship was driven ashore and wrecked at Barton on Sea, Hampshire with the loss of a crew member. She was on a voyage from Cádiz, Spain to Gothenburg.
Clio	United Kingdom	The ship was driven ashore at Cardiff. She was on a voyage from Cardiff to Naples, Kingdom of the Two Sicilies. Clio had been refloated by 9 December and taken in to Cardiff for repairs.
Commerce	United Kingdom	The ship was driven ashore and sank at Cardiff, Glamorgan. Her crew were rescued. Commerce had been refloated by 25 November.
Cornelia	Netherlands	The East Indiaman was driven ashore and wrecked at Ramsgate, Kent. Her crew were rescued. She was on a voyage from Batavia, Netherlands East Indies to Amsterdam, North Holland.
Coventry	United Kingdom	The ship was driven ashore at Portsmouth.
Dee	United Kingdom	The ship was driven ashore near Bangor, County Down. She was on a voyage from Belfast, County Antrim to Bristol, Gloucestershire. Dee was refloated on 9 December.
Desire	United Kingdom	The ship was driven ashore at Falmouth, Cornwall.
Deux Frères	France	The ship was driven ashore at Brest.
Diana	Netherlands	The East Indiaman was wrecked on the Goodwin Sands with the loss of thirteen of her nineteen crew.
Doncaster	United Kingdom	The ship was driven ashore at Portsmouth.
Duchess of Somerset	United Kingdom	The ship was driven ashore at Cardiff. She was on a voyage from Cardiff to Plymouth. Duchess of Somerset had been refloated by 25 November.
Ebenezer	United Kingdom	The ship was driven ashore at Portland, Dorset with the loss of her captain. She was on a voyage from Portsmouth to Plymouth.
Elizabeth	United Kingdom	The ship was driven ashore and wrecked at Tynemouth, County Durham. Her crew were rescued. She was on a voyage from South Shields, County Durham to Topsham, Devon.
Elizabeth	United Kingdom	The brig was driven ashore at Mount Batten, Plymouth. She was on a voyage from Arkhangelsk, Russia to Bristol, Gloucestershire. Elizabeth was refloated on 8 December.
Endeavour	United Kingdom	The ship was driven ashore in Studland Bay. She was refloated in January 1825 and put into Newhaven, Sussex.
Fame	United Kingdom	The schooner was driven ashore at Bridport.
Friendship	United Kingdom	The ship was driven ashore at Cardiff. She was on a voyage from Cardiff to Barnstaple, Devon. Friendship had been refloated by 25 November.
HMRC Fox	Board of Customs	The cutter driven ashore and wrecked west of Bridport with the loss of two of her crew.
George	United Kingdom	The ship was driven ashore at Cardiff. She was on a voyage from Cardiff to South Shields, County Durham. George had been refloated by 25 November.
George Canning	United Kingdom	The schooner was driven ashore at Plymouth. She was later refloated and taken in to Plymouth for repairs.
Gratitude	United Kingdom	The ship was driven ashore at Cardiff. She was on a voyage from Cardiff to Cork. Gratitude had been refloated by 11 December.
Habitant du Moule	France	The ship was driven ashore at Brest.
Happy Return	United Kingdom	The ship was wrecked near Padstow, Cornwall. She was on a voyage from Dublin to London.
Harmonie	Netherlands	The full-rigged ship was driven ashore and wrecked at Polom Cove, Devon with the loss of seven of her thirteen crew. She was on a voyage from Surinam to Middelburg, South Holland.
Harmony	Prussia	The ship struck the pier and sank at Ramsgate, Kent. She was on a voyage from Memel to Topsham, Devon.
Hazard	United Kingdom	The ship was driven ashore at Felpham, Sussex. She was on a voyage from Bordeaux, Gironde, France to Leith, Lothian. Hazard was later refloated but again drove ashore. She was refloated on 4 February 1825 and taken in to Littlehampton.
Hero	United Kingdom	The ship was wrecked off Christchurch Head, Dorset with the loss of six of her eight crew. She was on a voyage from Swanage, Dorset to Southampton, Hampshire.
Herring	United Kingdom	The ship was driven ashore at Great Yarmouth, Norfolk. She was on a voyage from Wisbech, Cambridgeshire to Dover, Kent.
Hibernia	United Kingdom	The schooner was driven ashore and wrecked at Plymouth with the loss of five of her crew.
Industry	United Kingdom	The brig was wrecked on the Gunfleet Sand, in the North Sea off the coast of Essex with the loss of all but two of her crew. One of the crew of the smack Colne (United Kingdom) that went to her assistance was also lost.
Jessie	United Kingdom	The ship was driven ashore at Great Yarmouth. Her crew were rescued by rocket apparatus, but five rescuers were drowned when their boat capsized.
Jeune Caroline	France	The ship was driven ashore either on the Île de Batz or at Roscoff, Finistère with the loss of a crew member. She was on a voyage from Penzance to Brest.
Johannes Christina	Netherlands	The ship was wrecked near Weymouth, Dorset. Her crew were rescued. She was on a voyage from Rotterdam, South Holland to Bordeaux, Gironde, France.
John	United Kingdom	The ship was driven ashore and damaged at Wembury, Devon with the loss of all but one of those on board. She was on a voyage from Livorno, Kingdom of Sardinia to London. John was refloated in mid-April 1825 and taken in to Plymouth.
John	United Kingdom	The ship was driven ashore at Littlehampton, Sussex. She was later refloated and taken in to Cowes, Isle of Wight.
John	United States	The ship was wrecked at Plymouth with the loss of all but one of those on board.
Jonge Richard	Netherlands	The ship was driven ashore near Brancaster.
Josephine	United Kingdom	The ship was driven ashore at Caister-on-Sea, Norfolk. Her crew were rescued by rocket apparatus. She was on a voyage from Stockholm, Sweden to Guernsey, Channel Islands.
Josephine	(United Kingdom of Great Britain and Ireland) Guernsey	The ship was driven ashore and severely damaged, either on the Île de Batz or at Roscoff. She was on a voyage from Guernsey to La Rochelle, Charente-Maritime, France.
Julia	United Kingdom	The ship foundered with the loss of all seven crew. She was on a voyage from Youghal, County Cork to London.
Lady Arabella	United Kingdom	The ship was driven ashore at Portsmouth.
Lady Hill	United Kingdom	The brig was wrecked on The Brigs Rocks, off Groomsport, County Antrim with the loss of five of the eight people on board. She was on a voyage from Ayr to Belfast. County Antrim.
Lark	United Kingdom	The ship was driven ashore at Cardiff. She was on a voyage from Cardiff to Exeter, Devon. Lark had been refloated by 25 November.
Letitia	(United Kingdom of Great Britain and Ireland) British North America	The ship was driven ashore at Dublin. She was refloated on 6 January 1825 and towed in to Dublin.
Liveley	United Kingdom	The sloop was driven ashore at Bridport.
Lord Nelson	United Kingdom	The ship was wrecked in Bigbury Bay with the loss of all on board, including 30 seamen from HMS Britannia (Royal Navy).
Louisa	United Kingdom	The ship was driven ashore at Plymouth.
Louisa	United Kingdom	The smack was driven ashore and wrecked at Weymouth, Dorset with the loss of two of her three crew.
Lovely Sally	United Kingdom	The ship was driven ashore at Falmouth.
Madras	United Kingdom	The ship was driven ashore and wrecked at Portsmouth.
Maria	United Kingdom	The ship foundered in the North Sea off Heligoland with the loss of all hands and six of her twelve passengers. She was on a voyage from London to Hamburg.
Mevagissey	United Kingdom	The ship was driven ashore near Broadstairs, Kent. She was on a voyage from London to Smyrna, Ottoman Empire. Mevagissey was later refloated and taken in to Ramsgate.
Nelson	United Kingdom	The ship was wrecked in Bigbury Bay with the loss of all on board, including 30 sailors from HMS Britannia (Royal Navy).
Newbiggin	United Kingdom	The collier, a brig, was driven ashore at Southampton, Hampshire. She was refloated on 25 November.
Osiris	Netherlands	The galiot was driven ashore at Portsmouth.
Providence	United Kingdom	The sloop was beached at White Rock, Hastings, Sussex, where she wrecked. Her crew survived. She was on a voyage from Portsmouth to London.
Resource	United Kingdom	The collier, a brig, was driven ashore at Portsmouth.
Russell	United Kingdom	The ship was driven ashore at Felpham. She broke up in late January 1825.
Sally	United Kingdom	The sloop foundered in the English Channel off the Isle of Wight.
Sally	United Kingdom	The ship foundered in the English Channel off Osmington Mills, Dorset with the loss of all but one of her crew. The survivor was rescued by Nancy (United Kingdom).
Sally	United Kingdom	The smack was driven ashore and wrecked at Weymouth with the loss of two of her crew.
Sampson	United Kingdom	The ship was driven ashore and sank at Cardiff. She had been refloated by 9 December and taken in to Cardiff for repairs.
Shipley	United Kingdom	The transport ship was driven ashore and severely damaged at Southsea, Hampshire. She was refloated on 7 December.
Sir Francis Drake	United Kingdom	The steamship was driven ashore at Stonehouse, Plymouth.
Sisters	(United Kingdom of Great Britain and Ireland) British North America	The ship was driven ashore near Dublin.
Spring Grove	United Kingdom	The whaler was wrecked north of Saffee with the loss of two of her crew. She was on a voyage from London to the South Seas.
Thomas and Jane	United Kingdom	The sloop was driven ashore near Wicklow. She was on a voyage from Glasgow to Cork.
Three Brothers	United Kingdom	The ship was driven ashore and wrecked east of Polperro, Cornwall with the loss of all four of her crew.
Three Friends	United Kingdom	The ship was driven ashore and wrecked at Polperro, Cornwall with the loss of all hands.
Two Sisters	Hamburg	The ship was wrecked at Abbotsbury, Dorset with the loss of one of her five crew. She was on a voyage from Málaga, Spain to Hamburg.
Unity	United Kingdom	The sloop was driven ashore and wrecked at Charmouth, Dorset. Her four crew were rescued. She was on a voyage from Charmouth, Dorset to London.
Victory	British East India Company	The East Indiaman was driven ashore at Portsmouth. She was on a voyage from Bengal, India, to London. Victory was refloated on 9 December.
HMS Wellesley	Royal Navy	The Black Prince-class ship of the line was driven ashore at Portsmouth.

== 24 November ==
List of shipwrecks: 24 November 1824
Ship	State	Description
Bastiaan	Netherlands	The ship was driven ashore at Brancaster, Norfolk, United Kingdom. She was on a voyage from Rotterdam, South Holland to King's Lynn, Norfolk. Bastiaan was refloated on 27 November and taken in to Brancaster.
Jong Richard	United Kingdom	The ship was driven ashore at Brancaster. She was on a voyage from Rotterdam to King's Lynn. Jong Richard was refloated on 27 November and taken in to Brancaster in a severely damaged condition.
Metous	Lübeck	The ship was driven ashore at Reval, Russia. She was on a voyage from Saint Petersburg, Russia to Lübeck.

== 25 November ==
List of shipwrecks: 25 November 1824
Ship	State	Description
Doncaster	United Kingdom	The ship was driven ashore at Portsmouth, Hampshire.
Nelson	United Kingdom	The ship was wrecked near Cherbourg, Seine-Inférieure. Her crew were rescued.
Sally	United States	The schooner was lost off "Cape Patrass" with the loss of three of her crew. Survivors were rescued by Maria (United States). Sally was on a voyage from Granada to Virginia.
Susannah	United Kingdom	The ship was driven ashore and severely damaged at Sunderland, County Durham. She was refloated on 5 December.
Vrow Hendrika	Netherlands	The galiot foundered in the English Channel off Start Point, Devon.

== 26 November ==
List of shipwrecks: 26 November 1824
Ship	State	Description
Camel	United Kingdom	The ship departed from Neath, Glamorgan for St. Ives, Cornwall. No further trace, presumed foundered in the Bristol Channel with the loss of all hands.

== 27 November ==
List of shipwrecks: 27 November 1824
Ship	State	Description
Claremont	United Kingdom	The ship was driven onto the Mouse Sand, in the Thames Estuary off the coast of Essex.
Diadem	United Kingdom	The ship was driven ashore near Beaumaris, Anglesey. She was later refloated and taken in to the Menai Strait.
Jupiter	United Kingdom	The ship was wrecked at The Needles, Isle of Wight. She was on a voyage from Newhaven, Sussex to Bristol, Gloucestershire.
Mary	United Kingdom	The ship was driven ashore and wrecked at Douglas, Isle of Man. Her crew were rescued. She was on a voyage from Liverpool, Lancashire to Port Rush, County Antrim.
Prince Regent	United Kingdom	The ship was driven ashore at Milford Haven, Pembrokeshire. She was on a voyage from Saint John, New Brunswick, British North America to Chepstow, Monmouthshire. Prince Regent was refloated the next day and taken in to Milford Haven.
Tino	Ottoman Empire	The ship was driven ashore in the Sea of Marmara. Her crew were rescued. She was on a voyage from London, United Kingdom to Smyrna and Constantinople. Tino was later refloated; she arrived at Constantinople on 9 December.

== 28 November ==
List of shipwrecks: 28 November 1824
Ship	State	Description
Eliza and Ann	United Kingdom	The ship was driven ashore at Littlehampton, Sussex. She was on a voyage from Sunderland, County Durham to Poole, Dorset.
Manchester	United Kingdom	The ship was driven on to the North Bank, in Liverpool Bay. She was later refloated and taken in to Liverpool, Lancashire.
Mary	United Kingdom	The ship was driven onto the Foreness Rock, Margate, Kent. She had been refloated by 30 November.
HMS Partridge	Royal Navy	The Cherokee-class brig-sloop was driven ashore and wrecked on Vlieland, Friesland, Netherlands. Her 70 crew survived.
Vrow Elizabeth	Netherlands	The ship was driven onto the Foreness Rock. She was on a voyage from Ostend, West Flanders to London, United Kingdom. She had been refloated by 30 November.

== 29 November ==
List of shipwrecks: 29 November 1824
Ship	State	Description
Palambang	United Kingdom	The ship was driven ashore at Whitstable, Kent. She was on a voyage from Riga, Russia to London. Palambang was refloated on 1 December.

== 30 November ==
List of shipwrecks: 30 November 1824
Ship	State	Description
Camperdown	United Kingdom	The ship was driven ashore near Dragør, Denmark. She was on a voyage from Saint Petersburg, Russia to Liverpool, Lancashire. Camperdown was later refloated and put into Copenhagen, Denmark for repairs.
Christian Wilhelm	Sweden	The ship sank near Strömstad.
Forth	United Kingdom	The ship was driven ashore at Pendine, Carmarthenshire. Her crew were rescued. She was on a voyage from Liverpool to São Miguel, Azores, Portugal.
Friendship	United Kingdom	The ship was driven ashore and wrecked at "Kenture", Islay. She was on a voyage from Wick, Caithness to Whitehaven, Cumberland.
Marie Louise	France	The ship was driven ashore at Sandwich, Kent, United Kingdom. She was on a voyage from Havre de Grâce, Seine-Inférieure to Brest, Finistère. Marie Louise was refloated the next day and taken in to Dover, Kent.
Orange Branch	United Kingdom	The ship was driven ashore and wrecked on Drake's Island, Devon. She was on a voyage from Newfoundland, British North America to Plymouth, Devon.
Perceval	(United Kingdom of Great Britain and Ireland) Grenada	The ship was driven ashore and severely damaged at Mount Batten, Plymouth, Devon. She was refloated on 3 January 1825 and taken in to the Cattewater.
Ploug	Flag unknown	The ship was wrecked on the Jadder Sandbank, in the North Sea. Her crew were rescued. She was on a voyage from Ostend, West Flanders, Netherlands to "Fasberg".
Sophia	Prussia	The ship was driven ashore and wrecked on Saltholm, Denmark. She was on a voyage from Memel to London, United Kingdom.
Spring	United Kingdom	The ship was driven ashore in Sutton Pool.

== Unknown date ==
List of shipwrecks: Unknown date 1824
Ship	State	Description
Active	United Kingdom	The ship was lost off Wangeroog, Kingdom of Hanover on or before 16 November.
Acuna	Gran Colombia	The schooner was captured and sunk by Santander ( Pirates).
Alfred	United Kingdom	The ship was driven ashore on Vlieland, Friesland, Netherlands. She was on a voyage from Rochester, Kent to Newcastle upon Tyne, Northumberland. Alfred was later refloated and taken in to Texel, North Holland, Netherlands for repairs.
Amboyna	United Kingdom	The ship was wrecked on a sandbank off Heynan, China in early November. She was on a voyage from Canton, China to Sincapore.
Ann	United Kingdom	The ship was lost at the mouth of the Eider in early November. She was on a voyage from Sunderland, County Durham to Hamburg.
Anne	United Kingdom	The ship was driven ashore and wrecked near Troon, Ayrshire. She was on a voyage from Porto, Portugal to the Clyde.
Atkinson	United Kingdom	The ship was abandoned in the North Sea 70 nautical miles (130 km) north north west of Texel, North Holland, Netherlands. Her crew were rescued by Molly (United Kingdom). She was on a voyage from South Shields, County Durham to Bridport, Dorset.
Cecelia	United Kingdom	The ship foundered in the Atlantic Ocean off the Isles of Scilly in mid-November.
Celia	Sweden	The ship foundered off Penzance, Cornwall, United Kingdom in mid-November.
Dantzig	Danzig	The ship was lost at the mouth of the Eider in early November with the loss of four of her crew. She was on a voyage from London, United Kingdom to Danzig.
Dart	United Kingdom	The ship was abandoned in the English Channel in late November. She was taken in to Selsey, Sussex on 30 November.
Duke of Wellington	United Kingdom	The brig was wrecked at Cahir, County Tipperary. She was on a voyage from Saint John, New Brunswick, British North America to Liverpool, Lancashire.
Elizabeth	United Kingdom	The ship was abandoned in the Atlantic Ocean. Her crew were rescued by John & Elizabeth (United Kingdom. She was on a voyage from Newfoundland to Bristol, Gloucestershire.
Emma	Hamburg	The ship was lost on the coast of Friesland, Netherlands with the loss of all hands. She was on a voyage from Bahia, Brazil to Hamburg.
Farmer's Fancy	United States	The ship capsized in the Atlantic Ocean off Cape St. Vincent, Portugal. Her crew were rescued on 4 November by Cape Breton (France). Farmer's Fancy was on a voyage from Málaga, Spain to Philadelphia, Pennsylvania.
Flora	flag unknown	The ship was wrecked on the coast of Jutland. Her crew were rescued.
Flora	United Kingdom	The ship departed from Dénia, Spain in early November. No further trace, presumed foundered with the loss of all hands.
Freemason	United Kingdom	The ship was driven ashore and wrecked between Helmsdale, Sutherland and Berriedale, Caithness in mid-November. Her crew were rescued.
Globe	United Kingdom	The ship was wrecked on Nickman's Ground, off Dagerort, Russia with the loss of her captain. She was on a voyage from St. Petersburg, Russia to London.
Granite	United Kingdom	The brig ran aground in the Miramichi River and was wrecked before 16 November. Her crew survived.
James	United Kingdom	The ship departed from Miramichi, New Brunswick for Liverpool in early November. No further trace, presumed foundered in the Atlantic Ocean with the loss of all hands.
Lively	United Kingdom	The ship was wrecked on the Dutch coast with the loss of all on board.
Mellona	United Kingdom	The ship was lost on the "Kinder Balje", or "Stein Sands". Her crew were rescued. She was on a voyage from Föhr, Duchy of Schleswig to London.
Neptune	United Kingdom	The ship was wrecked at "Simperness", Russia. She was on a voyage from St. Petersburg to Hull.
Prince Oscar	United Kingdom	The ship was driven ashore at Gothenburg, Sweden.
Robert	United States	The ship was wrecked on the Chico Bank, in the River Plate.
Sally	United States	The sloop foundered in the Atlantic Ocean. All on board were rescued by Daniel (United Kingdom).
Shamrock	United Kingdom	The schooner was wrecked west of Penzance, Cornwall in late November. She was on a voyage from Lisbon, Portugal to London.
Speculation	(Russian Empire) Grand Duchy of Finland	The ship capsized at Cuxhaven. She was refloated but capsized again and was severely damaged.
Trusty	United Kingdom	The ship was severely damaged on the Herd Sand, in the North Sea off the coast of County Durham. She was later refloated and taken in to North Shields, County Durham.
