= List of shipwrecks in November 1840 =

The list of shipwrecks in November 1840 includes ships sunk, foundered, wrecked, grounded, or otherwise lost during November 1840.

== 1 November ==
List of shipwrecks: 1 November 1840
Ship	State	Description
Bleng	United Kingdom	The ship sank in a hurricane at San Blas Atempa, Mexico.
Maria del Carmen	Mexico	The ship was driven ashore at San Blas Atempa.

== 2 November ==
List of shipwrecks: 2 November 1840
Ship	State	Description
Adelaide	Spain	The ship sank at Tarragona.
George	United Kingdom	The schooner ran aground and capsized on the Cross Sand, in the North Sea off the coast of Norfolk with the loss of all hands.
Hopewell	United Kingdom	The ship collided with the schooner Yandeu (United Kingdom) off the Nash Sands and sank with the loss of five lives. Four or six people were rescued. She was on a voyage from Newport, Monmouthshire to Cork.
Julia	United States	The ship was driven ashore in Gibraltar Bay. She was on a voyage from Norfolk, Virginia to Gibraltar. Julia was refloated on 13 November.
Mary Ann and Arabella	United Kingdom	The ship was wrecked near Tarifa, Spain. Her crew were rescued. She was on a voyage from Gibraltar to Cork.
Victory	United Kingdom	The ship ran aground on the Spaniard Sand, in the North Sea. She was on a voyage from Bangor to London.

== 3 November ==
List of shipwrecks: 3 November 1840
Ship	State	Description
Blucher	Russia	The ship was driven ashore at Kerch.
Due Amichi	Flag unknown	The schooner foundered in the Sea of Azov off Kerch.
Julia	United States	The ship was driven ashore in Gibraltar Bay.
Liberal	United Kingdom	The ship was driven ashore and abandoned at Mazatlán, Mexico, where she became a wreck by 9 November. She was on a voyage from London to Mazatlán.
Medina	United Kingdom	The ship was driven ashore at Yarmouth, Isle of Wight. She was on a voyage from Yarmouth to Sunderland, County Durham.
St. Giovani	Flag unknown	The ship was driven ashore at Kerch.

== 5 November ==
List of shipwrecks: 5 November 1840
Ship	State	Description
Norway	France	The ship was wrecked on Key Sal Bank. All on board were rescued. She was on a voyage from Havre de Grâce, Seine-Inférieure to New Orleans, Louisiana, United States.

== 6 November ==
List of shipwrecks: 6 November 1840
Ship	State	Description
Bornholm	Denmark	The ship was driven ashore at "Hornebeck". She was on a voyage from Málaga, Spain, to Saint Petersburg, Russia. Bornholm was refloated and towed into Copenhagen for repairs.
Brothers	United Kingdom	The ship ran aground on the August rocks. She was on a voyage from Penzance, Cornwall to Swansea, Glamorgan.
Clarence	United Kingdom	The ship was driven ashore at Helsingør, Denmark. She was on a voyage from Saint Petersburg to London.
Margaret	United Kingdom	The ship struck the North Bull, in the Irish Sea off the cost of County Dublin and was abandoned. She was on a voyage from Liverpool, Lancashire to Westport, County Mayo.Margaret was subsequently taken into Dundalk, County Louth
Margaret	United Kingdom	The ship was abandoned in the Atlantic Ocean with the loss of four of her nine crew. Survivors were rescued by British Queen (United Kingdom). Margaret was on a voyage from Chaleur Bay to Leith, Lothian.
Margarethe	Belgium	The ship ran aground off Beddingestrand, Sweden. She was on a voyage from Riga, Russia to Ghent.
Sir Bourchier Wrey	United Kingdom	The ship was driven ashore in the Lymington River. She was on a voyage from London to Lisbon, Portugal. Sir Bouchier Wrey was refloated on 14 November.
Thomas and Ann	United Kingdom	The ship was driven ashore at Helsingør. She was on a voyage from Saint Petersburg to Arbroath, Forfarshire.

== 7 November ==
List of shipwrecks: 7 November 1840
Ship	State	Description
Ampion	Hamburg	The ship was wrecked on the coast of Apulia, part of the Kingdom of the Two Sicilies, while on a voyage from Hamburg to Gibraltar and Trieste.
Basque	France	The ship was wrecked near Royan, Charente-Maritime, while on a voyage from "Terra Firma" to Bordeaux, Gironde. Her crew were rescued.
Omnibus	United Kingdom	The ship was driven aground in the River Afan.
Susannah	United Kingdom	The collier struck the pier and sank at Scarborough, Yorkshire. She was refloated.

== 8 November ==
List of shipwrecks: 8 November 1840
Ship	State	Description
Preston	United Kingdom	The brig was abandoned in the Atlantic Ocean (45°42′N 23°20′W). Her crew were rescued by Ambassador (United Kingdom). Preston was on a voyage from Quebec City, Lower Canada, British North America to Great Yarmouth, Norfolk.

== 9 November ==
List of shipwrecks: 9 November 1840
Ship	State	Description
Active	United Kingdom	The ship was driven ashore and sank at Domesnes, Norway. Her crew were rescued.
Collina	United States	The ship was wrecked at Croyde, Devon, United Kingdom with the loss of four of her crew. She was on a voyage from Prince Edward Island, British North America to Bridport, Dorset, United Kingdom.
Mary	United Kingdom	The schooner was wrecked between Île de Groix and the Glenan Islands, France. She was on a voyage from Newcastle upon Tyne, Northumberland to Barcelona, Spain.

== 10 November ==
List of shipwrecks: 10 November 1840
Ship	State	Description
Ceres	Flag unknown	The ship sprang a leak and was beached at Dartmouth, Devon, United Kingdom She was on a voyage from Visby, Sweden to Marseille, Bouches-du-Rhône.
Hope	United Kingdom	The ship ran aground in the River Tees and was severely damaged.
New Blessing	United Kingdom	The schooner was wrecked on the Cross Sand, in the North Sea off the coast of Norfolk. Her crew were rescued. She was on a voyage from South Shields, County Durham to Plymouth, Devon.

== 11 November ==
List of shipwrecks: 11 November 1840
Ship	State	Description
Aurora	Bremen	The ship was wrecked at Domesnes, Norway. She was on a voyage from Riga, Russia, to Gävle, Sweden.
Copy	United Kingdom	The ship was driven ashore 5 nautical miles (9.3 km) east of Calais, France. She was on a voyage from Great Yarmouth, Norfolk to Livorno, Grand Duchy of Tuscany. Copy was refloated on 14 November and resumed her voyage.
Jane Kelly	United Kingdom	The ship was wrecked in the Letote Passage. Her crew were rescued. She was on a voyage from Tobago to Saint John, New Brunswick, British North America.
Melrose	United Kingdom	The ship was wrecked on a reef off "Malanta", in the Solomon Islands. She was on a voyage from Sydney, New South Wales to Manila, Spanish East Indies.
Sophia	Prussia	The ship was driven ashore at Kragerø, Norway. She was on a voyage from Liverpool, Lancashire, United Kingdom to Liebau. Sophia was refloated and taken into "East Ries" for repairs.
Vrow Alida	(flag) Kingdom of Hanover	The ship was wrecked near Amrum, Duchy of Schleswig. Her crew were rescued. She was on a voyage from Leer to Antwerp, Belgium.

== 12 November ==
List of shipwrecks: 12 November 1840
Ship	State	Description
Champion	United Kingdom	The barque was wrecked on the Haisborough Sands, in the North Sea off the coast of Norfolk. All on board were rescued. She was on a voyage from Quebec City, Lower Canada, British North America to Hull, Yorkshire.
Collins	United Kingdom	The ship was wrecked at Baggy's Point, Devon with the loss of all but two of her crew. She was on a voyage from Prince Edward Island, British North America to Bideford, Devon.
Dart	United Kingdom	The ship was driven ashore at Folkestone, Kent. She was on a voyage from London to Liverpool, Lancashire. Dart was refloated the next day and resumed her voyage.
Elida	Norway	The ship foundered off Bergen. Her crew were rescued.
Lydia	United Kingdom	The ship departed from Portreath, Cornwall for Neath, Glamorgan. No further trace, presumed foundered with the loss of all hands.
Montrose	United Kingdom	The ship was wrecked at Point Ebert, British North America with the loss of two lives. She was on a voyage from Quebec City, Lower Canada to Liverpool.
Rose	United Kingdom	The ship was driven ashore near North Killingholme, Lincolnshire. She was on a voyage from Hull to Whitby.
Three Sisters	United Kingdom	The schooner capsized in the Cattewater with the loss of all four crew.
William and Catharina	Netherlands	The ship was driven ashore at Enkhuizen, North Holland. Her crew were resceued. She was on a voyage from Amsterdam to Hamburg. William and Catharina was later refloated and taken into Enkhuizen for repairs.

== 13 November ==
List of shipwrecks: 13 November 1840
Ship	State	Description
Admiral Berkeley	United Kingdom	The troopship was driven ashore at the Haslar Hospital, Portsmouth, Hampshire. Over 900 people were rescued.
Alert	United Kingdom	The brig foundered in the Bristol Channel between Padstow, Cornwall and Lundy Island, Devon with the loss of eight of her nine crew. The survivor was rescued by the smack Four Friends (United Kingdom).
Ant	United Kingdom	The Humber Keel was driven ashore and wrecked between Lowestoft and Southwold, Suffolk. Her crew were rescued. She was on a voyage from Maldon, Essex to Wakefield, Yorkshire.
Ashley	United Kingdom	The ship struck a sunken wreck and sank at Great Yarmouth, Norfolk. She was on a voyage from Great Yarmouth to London. Ashley was later refloated.
Betty and Jenny	United Kingdom	The sloop was wrecked in Douglas Bay.
Caledonia	United Kingdom	The ship was wrecked near Arichat, Nova Scotia, British North America. Her crew were rescued. She was on a voyage from Quebec City, Lower Canada, British North America to Liverpool, Lancashire.
Caravan	United Kingdom	The ship was wrecked on Thorn Island, Pembrokeshire. Her crew were rescued.
Clarence	United Kingdom	The ship was holed by her anchor and sank at Hull, Yorkshire. She was on a voyage from Quebec City, Lower Canada, British North America to Hull.
Comet	United Kingdom	The schooner struck the quayside and sank at Plymouth, Devon with the loss of a crew member. She was refloated on 22 April 1841 and beached.
Dove	United Kingdom	The brig was driven against the quayside and sank at Dell Quay, Sussex.
Deux Frères	(United Kingdom of Great Britain and Ireland) Jersey	The ship was driven ashore and sank at Saint Sampson, Guernsey, Channel Islands. She was on a voyage from Paimpol, Côtes-du-Nord to Jersey.
Durham Packet	United Kingdom	The ship foundered in the North Sea off the coast of County Durham with the loss of all hands.
Edouard	France	The ship was driven ashore at Deal, Kent, United Kingdom and was damaged. She was on a voyage from London, United Kingdom to Saint Domingo. Edouard was refloated and taken into Ramsgate, Kent.
Ellen	United Kingdom	The ship was wrecked at Sunderland, County Durham. Her crew were rescued.
HMS Fairy	Royal Navy	The Cherokee-class brig-sloop foundered in the North Sea off the coast of Suffolk with the loss of all 43 people on board.
Friends	United Kingdom	The brig was driven ashore and wrecked west of Eastbourne, Sussex with the loss of all nine of her crew. She was on a voyage from Jersey, Channel Islands to Sunderland, County Durham.
Gezina	Netherlands	The ship was wrecked on the Long Sand, in the North Sea off the coast of Essex. Her crew were rescued. She was on a voyage from Groningen to London.
Helen	United Kingdom	The ship was wrecked at Sunderland. Her nine crew were rescued by the Sunderland Lifeboat.
Hendon	United Kingdom	The ship foundered in the North Sea off the coast of County Durham with the loss of all hands.
Hope	United Kingdom	The ship was driven ashore in the River Avon at Bristol, Gloucestershire. She was on a voyage from Bristol to Cork. Hope was refloated on 15 November.
Hunter	United Kingdom	The brig sprang a leak and was beached at Yarmouth, Isle of Wight. All fifteen people on board were rescued by the Yarmouth Lifeboat. She was on a voyage from Newcastle upon Tyne, Northumberland to London.
Johanna Maria	Netherlands	The schuyt was driven ashore 2 nautical miles (3.7 km) south of Orfordness, Suffolk. She was on a voyage from London to Vegesack, Bremen. Johnanna Maria was consequently condemned.
Joseph	United Kingdom	The brig sprang a leak and was beached east of Eastbourne, where she was wrecked. Her eight crew were rescued. She was on a voyage from Sunderland to Portsmouth, Hampshire.
Joseph and Ann	United Kingdom	The schooner was wrecked on the Mixen Sands, in the English Channel. Her crew were rescued. She subsequently came ashore at Selsey Bill, Sussex.
Leonora	United Kingdom	The schooner was driven ashore in Deadman's Bay. She was later refloated.
Lincoln	United Kingdom	The ship was driven ashore and sank at Lowestoft, Suffolk. Her crew were rescued. She was refloated on 17 November and taken into Lowestoft in a severely damaged condition.
Lively	United Kingdom	The smack was driven ashore at Bracklesham Bay, Sussex, whilst on a voyage from Poole, Dorset to Newhaven, Sussex. Her crew of five were rescued by Coastguard Officers from Littlehampton.
Lydia	United Kingdom	The ship foundered with the loss of all hands. She was on a voyage from Portreath, Cornwall to Neath, Glamorgan.
Madras	United Kingdom	The East Indiaman was driven ashore and wrecked in Stokes Bay.
Margaret	United Kingdom	The schooner was wrecked near Ilfracombe, Devon. Her four crew were rescued. She was on a voyage from Falmouth, Cornwall to Neath, Glamorgan.
Mary	United Kingdom	The brig was driven ashore and wrecked at Roedean, Sussex. Her six crew were rescued by rocket apparatus. She was on a voyage from Sunderland to Shoreham-by-Sea, Sussex.
Mary	United Kingdom	The collier, a brig, sprang a leak and sank in the North Sea off Great Yarmouth. Her twelve crew were rescued by the yawl Pilot (United Kingdom). Mary was on a voyage from South Shields, County Durham to London
Mary and Ann	United Kingdom	The ship was driven ashore and wrecked on the coat of County Wicklow. She was on a voyage from Dublin to Newport, Monmouthshire.
Mayflower	United Kingdom	The ship capsized and sank at Southampton, Hampshire.
Metta Claudine	Denmark	The galleass was driven ashore near Hjørring. She was on a voyage from Hull to Thisted.
Meteor	United Kingdom	The ship was driven ashore in the Humber near Limekiln Creek. She was on a voyage from Quebec City to Hull.
Monica	United Kingdom	The ship was driven onto the Middle Sand, in the North Sea off the coast of Norfolk and sank. Her crew were rescued.
Montrose	United Kingdom	The barque was wrecked near "Port Ebert", British North America with the loss of two passengers. Her crew were rescued. She was on a voyage from Quebec City to London.
Natchez	United States	The ship was driven ashore near Nettlestone, Isle of Wight, United Kingdom. She was on a voyage from London to Savannah, Georgia. Natchez was refloated and towed into Portsmouth.
Nimrod	United Kingdom	The ship was driven ashore and severely damaged at Southampton, Hampshire.
Offerton	United Kingdom	The brig was driven ashore at Newhaven. Her crew were rescued by the Coast Guard.
Orwell	United Kingdom	The brig was driven ashore and wrecked at Portobello. 4 nautical miles (7.4 km) east of Brighton, Sussex. Her eight crew were rescued by rocket apparatus
Pero	United Kingdom	The barque was driven ashore at Mount Batten, Devon. She was on a voyage from Sydney, New South Wales to London. Pero was later refloated.
Pomona	United Kingdom	The schooner was driven ashore near Southsea Castle, Hampshire. She was on a voyage from London to Southampton. Pomona broke up on 20 November.
Prince Albert	United Kingdom	The ship sank in the Bristol Channel off Dale, Pembrokeshire. She was refloated on 29 December and taken into Milford Haven, Pembrokeshire.
Queen	United Kingdom	The barque was driven ashore at Sandhale, Lincolnshire. She was on a voyage from Quebec City to Hull. She was refloated.
Rambler	United Kingdom	The ship foundered in the North Sea off the mouth of the Humber. Her crew were rescued. She was on a voyage from Hull to King's Lynn, Norfolk.
Request	United Kingdom	The collier, a brig, was driven ashore and wrecked between Dunwich and Walberswick, Suffolk with the loss of six of her ten crew. Survivors were rescued by rocket apparatus.
Rose	United Kingdom	The ship was driven ashore at Aberdeen. She was on a voyage from Wick, Caithness to London.
Rover	United Kingdom	The schooner capsized off South Shields, County Durham with the loss of all five people on board. She was on a voyage from Whitby, Yorkshire to South Shields.
Shannon	United Kingdom	The barge sank in the River Thames at Limehouse, Middlesex.
Shipley	United Kingdom	The transport ship was driven ashore at Portsmouth.
Sir John Seale	United Kingdom	The schooner was driven ashore at Brighton. Her crew were rescued by rocket apparatus. She was on a voyage from Leith, Lothian to Dartmouth, Devon.
Six Brothers	United Kingdom	The sailing barge was driven ashore and sank at Lowestoft. Her crew were rescued. She was on a voyage from London to Sunderland. Six Brothers was refloated on 15 November and taken into Great Yarmouth.
Star	United Kingdom	The ship was wrecked off the Owers Sandbank, in the English Channel off the coast of Sussex. Her crew survived. She was on a voyage from London to Malta and Zante, United States of the Ionian Islands.
Susan	United Kingdom	The collier capsized off Walton-on-the-Naze, Essex and sank with the loss of four of her crew. She was on a voyage from London to South Shileds.
Syria	United Kingdom	The ship, which had been launched the previous day, was driven ashore and wrecked on the North Beacon Rock, off Sunderland, with the loss of four of her seven crew. Survivors were rescued by the Sunderland Lifeboat.
Union	United Kingdom	The ship was driven onto the Corton Sand, in the North Sea off the coast of Suffolk and sank. Her crew were rescued. She was on a voyage from New York, United States to Hull.
Victoria	United Kingdom	The ship was driven ashore near Littlehampton. The crew of nine were rescued by officers of H.M. Coastguard.
Wigeon	United Kingdom	The sloop was lost near Whitby, Yorkshire with the loss of all hands.
William Pitt	United Kingdom	The ship was driven onto the Neyland Rock, Margate, Kent. She was on a voyage from London to Hastings, Sussex. William Pitt was refloated the next day and taken into Margate.

== 14 November ==
List of shipwrecks: 14 November 1840
Ship	State	Description
Albert	United Kingdom	The ship foundered in the Bristol Channel 7 leagues (21 nautical miles (39 km)) east by south of Lundy Island, Devon with the loss of all but one of her crew. She was on a voyage from Hayle, Cornwall to South Shields, County Durham.
Bellona	Stettin	The ship was driven ashore and wrecked on Sanday, Orkney Islands, United Kingdom. She was on a voyage from Liverpool, Lancashire to Stettin.
Boddingtons	United Kingdom	The barque was abandoned in the Atlantic Ocean. Her fourteen crew were rescued by the brig Theron (United Kingdom). Boddingtons was on a voyage from "Romusco" to London.
Deux Amis	France	The ship was wrecked on the Memsey Rock. Her crew were rescued. She was on a voyage from Laguna, Brazil to Dunkirk, Nord.
Eliza and Margaret	United Kingdom	The ship was wrecked on the west side of Dungeness, Kent with the loss of two of her crew. She was on a voyage from "Wyburg" to Gloucester.
Fama	United Kingdom	The ship ran aground in the River Mersey. She was on a voyage from Liverpool, Lancashire to St. Ubes, Portugal. Fama was refloated and taken into Liverpool for repairs.
Harmony	United Kingdom	The ship was abandoned in the North Sea 30 nautical miles (56 km) off Cromer, Norfolk. Her crew were rescued by Clare (United Kingdom).
Hope	United Kingdom	The brig was wrecked on the Barnard Sand, in the North Sea off the coast of Norfolk. Her crew were rescued.
Lowestoffe	(United Kingdom of Great Britain and Ireland) New South Wales	The ship ran aground, capsized and sank 4 nautical miles (7.4 km) off Geelong with the loss of a crew member.
Mary Ann	United Kingdom	The ship was wrecked in Bigbury Bay with the loss of all hands. She was on a voyage from Plymouth, Devon to Penzance, Cornwall.
Ralph Wylam	United Kingdom	The ship was driven ashore on Öland, Sweden. She was on a voyage from Saint Petersburg, Russia to London. Ralph Wylam was later refloated and put into Kalmar for repairs.
Star	United Kingdom	The brig struck the Owers Sandbank, in the English Channel and foundered. Her crew survived. She was on a voyage from London to Malta, Corfu, Greece and Zante, United States of the Ionian Islands.
Three Johns	United Kingdom	The ship departed from Mistley, Essex for Goole, Yorkshire. No further trace, presumed foundered with the loss of all hands.
Victory	United Kingdom	The brig was driven ashore and severely damaged at Bracklesham Bay, Sussex. Her crew were rescued.

== 15 November ==
List of shipwrecks: 15 November 1840
Ship	State	Description
Comet	United Kingdom	The schooner struck the breakwater and sank at Plymouth, Devon with the loss of all four crew.
Dover Castle	United Kingdom	The paddle steamer was driven ashore at Cahiracon, County Clare.
Eclipse	United Kingdom	The ship was driven ashore at Lowestoft, Suffolk. she was later refloated and taken into Lowestoft.
Emerald	United Kingdom	The ship was driven ashore near Étaples, Pas-de-Calais, France. Her crew were rescued. She was on a voyage from Bathurst, New Brunswick, British North America to Newcastle upon Tyne, Northumberland. Emerald was consequently condemned.
Najaden	(Russian Empire) Grand Duchy of Finland	The ship was driven ashore on Öland, Sweden. She was on a voyage from Åbo to an English port. Najaden was later refloated and resumed her voyage.
Perseverance	United Kingdom	The sloop was wrecked on the Rose Sand, in the North Sea off the coast of Lincolnshire with the loss of all hands. She was on a voyage from Hull, Yorkshire to King's Lynn, Norfolk.
Speedwell	United Kingdom	The ship was driven ashore and wrecked on Cranfield Point, County Down. Her crew were rescued. She was on a voyage from Saltcoats, Ayrshire to Milford Haven, Pembrokeshire.
Wilhelmine	Flag unknown	The ship was driven ashore on Seskar, Grand Duchy of Finland.
William and John	United Kingdom	The ship was abandoned by her crew and foundered in the North Sea off Ness Point, Suffolk. Her crew were rescued by the smack Fly (United Kingdom).

== 16 November ==
List of shipwrecks: 16 November 1840
Ship	State	Description
Commodore	United Kingdom	The schooner ran aground and sank off The Mumbles, Glamorgan. Her crew were rescued. She was on a voyage from Bristol, Gloucestershire to Cork.
Defiance	United Kingdom	The ship was wrecked on the Long Sand, in the North Sea off the coast of Essex. Her crew were rescued. She was on a voyage from Newcastle upon Tyne, Northumberland to Plymouth, Devon.
Dolphin	United Kingdom	The ship was in collision with a brig off Kingstown, County Dublin and was abandoned by her crew. She was on a voyage from Aberystwyth, Cardiganshire to Ayr.
Dumfriesshire	United Kingdom	The ship ran aground on the Carrick Bank, in Liverpool Bay. She was on a voyage from Liverpool, Lancashire. Dumfriesshire was refloated the next day.
Ebberly	United Kingdom	The sloop was wrecked at Cefn Sidan, Carmarthenshire. Her crew were rescued. She was on a voyage from Bristol to Barnstaple, Devon. The wreck of Ebberly was refloated on 26 November.
Hand of Providence	United Kingdom	The brig was wrecked on the Trinity Sand, in the North Sea. She was on a voyage from Stockton-on-Tees, County Durham to [London].
Hope	United Kingdom	The brig was wrecked on the Barnard Sand, in the North Sea off the coast of Norfolk. Her crew were rescued. She was on a voyage from Sunderland, County Durham to Chatham, Kent.
James and Jane	United Kingdom	The ship was abandoned in the Atlantic Ocean. Her crew were rescued.
Lord Nelson	United Kingdom	The ship ran aground on the North Bank, in Liverpool Bay and was wrecked. Her six crew were rescued. She was on a voyage from Poole, Dorset to Runcorn, Cheshire. Lord Nelson was refloated the next day and beached in the River Mersey.
Nerino	France	The brig capsized off the Isles of Scilly and was subsequently driven ashore at Porth Hellick, on St. Mary's on 18 November. Four of her seven crew were rescued. She was on a voyage from Dunkirk, Nord to Marseille, Bouches-du-Rhône.
Nordlyset	Norway	The schooner was wrecked between "Oxoe" and Flekkerøy with the loss of all hands. She was on a voyage from Stettin to Jersey, Channel Islands.
Perseverance	United Kingdom	The ship was wrecked on the Gunfleet Sand, in the North Sea off the coast of Essex. Her crew were rescued. She was on a voyage from Stockton on Tees to London.
Providence	United Kingdom	The brig ran aground and sank off The Mumbles. Her crew were rescued. She was on a voyage from Newport, Monmouthshire to Hayle, Cornwall.
Unity	United Kingdom	The schooner was driven ashore and wrecked in Douglas Bay, Isle of Man. Her crew were rescued.
Venus	United Kingdom	The ship was abandoned in the English Channel off Portland, Dorset. Her crew were rescued by Ludd (Belgium). Venus was on a voyage from Jersey, Channel Islands to Bridport, Dorset.
Zephyr	United Kingdom	The ship was abandoned in the North Sea 30 nautical miles (56 km) north north west of Great Yarmouth, Norfolk.

== 17 November ==
List of shipwrecks: 17 November 1840
Ship	State	Description
Anna Sophia	Lübeck	The ship foundered in the Irish Sea off Calf of Man, Isle of Man. Her crew were rescued. She was on a voyage from Lübeck to Liverpool, Lancashire, United Kingdom.
City of Bristol	United Kingdom	The steamship foundered in Rhossili Bay with the loss of 35 of the 36 people on board. She was on a voyage from Waterford to Bristol, Gloucestershire.
Eleanor and Jane	United Kingdom	The sloop was driven ashore on the Booth Sands, Merionethshire.
Elizabeth	United Kingdom	The barque was driven ashore in the Cattewater. She was refloated and taken into Plymouth, Devon.
Glasgow	United Kingdom	The ship was wrecked on Cape Sable Island, Nova Scotia, British North America with the loss of two of her crew. She was on a voyage from Quebec City, Lower Canada, British North America to Glasgow, Renfrewshire.
Hengist	United Kingdom	The sloop was driven ashore and wrecked at Hayling Island, Hampshire. Her three crew were rescued by the Coast Guard.
Scotland	United Kingdom	The barque was driven ashore and damaged at Formby, Lancashire. Her 29 crew were rescued by the Formby Lifeboat. She was on a voyage from Quebec City to Liverpool. Scotland was refloated on 13 December and towed into the River Mersey.
Vrow Hellegina	Netherlands	The ship was lost in the Vlie with the loss of two of her four crew. She was on a voyage from Newcastle upon Tyne, Northumberland, United Kingdom to Amsterdam, North Holland.

== 18 November ==
List of shipwrecks: 18 November 1840
Ship	State	Description
Aletta	Netherlands	The ship was abandoned in the North Sea off Texel, North Holland. Her crew were rescued. She was on a voyage from Grangemouth, Stirlingshire, United Kingdom to Rotterdam, South Holland.
Ardent	United Kingdom	The ship was wrecked on the west point of Prince Edward Island, British North America. Her crew were rescued. She was on a voyage from Quebec City, Lower Canada, British North America to Neath, Glamorgan.
Boddle	United Kingdom	The smack was wrecked in Freshwater Bay, Isle of Wight.
Border Chieftain	United Kingdom	The ship was driven ashore at Spittal Point, Northumberland. Her crew were rescued.
Eleanor and Jane	United Kingdom	The ship was wrecked on the Booth Sands, in Carnarvon Bay.
Eliza	United Kingdom	The Billy-boy collided with a brig and was beached in the River Thames at Wapping, Middlesex.
Elizabeth	United Kingdom	The ship was holed by her anchor and sank at Dordrecht, South Holland, Netherlands. She was on a voyage from Liverpool, Lancashire to Dordrecht.
Frederika Louuisa	Denmark	The ship was driven ashore near Rönnebeck. She was on a voyage from Saint Petersburg, Russia to Copenhagen. Frederika Louisa was refloated the next day and taken into "Utxce" for repairs.
James Duncan	United Kingdom	The ship was driven ashore in Ballyholme Bay. She was refloated on 24 November and towed into Garmoyle, County Antrim.
Leslie	United Kingdom	The collier was wrecked on the Middle Sand, in the North Sea off the coast of Essex.
Maria	United Kingdom	The ship was abandoned off the Isles of Scilly. She was on a voyage from Swansea, Glamorgan to Lisbon, Portugal.
Maria	United Kingdom	The ship was driven ashore on Prince Edward Island and was abandoned by her crew. She was on a voyage from Quebec City to Londonderry.
Oletta	Netherlands	The ship was abandoned in the North Sea off Texel, North Holland. She was on a voyage from Grangemouth, Stirlingshire, United Kingdom to Rotterdam, South Holland.
Rose	United Kingdom	The ship was driven ashore on Spittal Point. Her crew were rescued.
Ruby	United Kingdom	The ship was abandoned in the Atlantic Ocean. Her crew were rescued by Charlotte(United Kingdom). Ruby was on a voyage from Liverpool to Lisbon.

== 19 November ==
List of shipwrecks: 19 November 1840
Ship	State	Description
Activo	Portugal	The ship was wrecked in the Bay of Biscay with the loss of four of her crew. She was on a voyage from Liverpool, Lancashire, United Kingdom to Lisbon. She was taken into St. Thomas, Virgin Islands on 19 January 1841.
Alexander and Camilla	United Kingdom	The ship was wrecked on Ameland, Friesland, Netherlands. She was on a voyage from Windau, Prussia to Millbay, Devon.
Bransby	United Kingdom	The ship was driven ashore at Ravenglass, Cumberland. She was on a voyage from Newport, Monmouthshire to Liverpool, Lancashire.
Constant	United Kingdom	The ship was driven ashore in the Scheldt.
Eliza	United Kingdom	The ship was driven ashore at Lamblay Point, Devon.
Eliza	United Kingdom	The ship was wrecked near "Marie Joseph". Her crew were rescued. she was on a voyage from Saint John's, Newfoundland to Halifax, Nova Scotia, British North America.
Hero	United Kingdom	The brig ran aground on the Herd Sand, in the North Sea off the coast of County Durham. She was on a voyage from Dundee, Forfarshire to South Shields, County Durham. Hero was later refloated.
James	United Kingdom	The ship was driven ashore at Bangor, County Down. She was on a voyage from Belfast, County Antrim to Liverpool. She was refloated on 22 November and towed into Belfast.
Jean	United Kingdom	The ship ran aground on the Herd Sand and was damaged. She was on a voyage from Newburgh, Fife to South Shields. Jean was refloated and taken into South Shields in a leaky condition.
Lamb	United Kingdom	The ship was driven ashore at Zeeburg, North Holland, Netherlands. She was on a voyage from Amsterdam, North Holland to Newcastle upon Tyne, Northumberland. Lamb was later refloated and taken into Harlingen, Friesland, Netherlands.
Leslie Ogilby	United Kingdom	The ship was abandoned in the Swin, off the coast of Essex.
Luna	United Kingdom	The ship was driven ashore at Mockbeggar, Cheshire. She was on a voyage from Leith, Lothian to Liverpool.
Mary	United Kingdom	The ship was driven ashore at Pelican's Point, in the Gulf of Smyrna.
Mermaid	United Kingdom	The ship was driven ashore and wrecked at Dartmouth, Devon. Her crew were rescued. She was on a voyage from Exeter to Totnes.
Robert and Ann	United Kingdom	The sloop was driven ashore and wrecked at Ruswick, Yorkshire with the loss of all hands.
Sarah and Nancy	United Kingdom	The ship was run down and sunk by Ocean (United Kingdom) with some loss of life. Survivors were rescued by Ocean. Sarah and Nancy was on a voyage from Arkhangelsk, Russia to Cork.
Shakespeare	United Kingdom	The ship ran aground near Kronstadt, Russia.
St. Pierre	France	The ship was driven ashore on the English coast. She was on a voyage from Hartlepool, County Durham to Bordeaux, Gironde.
Susanna	United Kingdom	The ship was driven ashore and severely damaged at Bangor, County Down.
Zeefriedenhuis	Netherlands	The ship was driven ashore in the Vlie. She was on a voyage from Amsterdam to Stettin. Zeefriedenhuis was later refloated and taken into Harlingen.

== 20 November ==
List of shipwrecks: 20 November 1840
Ship	State	Description
Anna Elizabeth	Belgium	The ship was driven ashore derelict and crewless on Juist, Kingdom of Hanover. She was on a voyage from Memel, Prussia to Ghent.
Brothers	United Kingdom	The brig ran aground on the Maplin Sand, in the North Sea off the coast of Essex. She was on a voyage from South Shields, County Durham to London. Brothers was refloated and taken into the River Colne in a severely leaky condition.
Camoens	United Kingdom	The ship ran aground at La Guaira, Venezuela. She was on a voyage from Trinidad to La Guaira. Camoens was later refloated.
Franz Eric	Lübeck	The ship ran aground off Osmussaar, Russia. She was on a voyage from Lübeck to Stockholm, Sweden. Franz Eric was refloated and beached near Spithami.
General Stokes	United States	The ship was wrecked at St. Agnes, Cornwall, United Kingdom with the loss of all hands.
La Belle Portugaise	France	The schooner was driven ashore and wrecked at Oreias, Portugal. All on board were rescued.
Lord Byron	United Kingdom	The ship was driven ashore at Wells-next-the-Sea, Norfolk. She was on a voyage from Newcastle upon Tyne, Northumberland to Wells-next-the-Sea.
Malta	United Kingdom	The ship sprang a leak and was abandoned in the Gulf of Saint Lawrence. She was subsequently taken into Prince Edward Island, arriving on 23 November.
Patriot	United Kingdom	The ship was driven ashore onto the Rose Sand, in the North Sea. She was on a voyage from Riga, Russia to Hull, Yorkshire. She was refloated and beached at Tetney Haven, Lincolnshire. Patriot was refloated on 28 November and taken into Hull.
Spy	(United Kingdom of Great Britain and Ireland) Jersey	The ship was driven ashore at Seaton, Devon. She was on a voyage from Jersey to Axmouth, Devon.
The General	United Kingdom	The brig was wrecked at Portreath, Cornwall with the loss of all thirteen crew. She was on a voyage from Glasgow, Renfrewshire to Marseille, Bouches-du-Rhône, France.
Tritonia	United Kingdom	The ship was driven ashore at Pakefield, Suffolk. She was refloated and taken into Lowestoft, Suffolk.
Vixen	United Kingdom	The ship ran aground at Sharpness, Gloucestershire. She was refloated the next day.

== 21 November ==
List of shipwrecks: 21 November 1840
Ship	State	Description
Aurora	United Kingdom	The ship was driven ashore on Jersey, Channel Islands and was severely damaged. She was later refloated.
Brothers	United Kingdom	The brig was wrecked in the Somme.
Ebenezer	United Kingdom	The brig ran aground and was wrecked at Havre de Grâce, Seine-Inférieure, France. Her crew were rescued. She was on a voyage from Sunderland, County Durham to Caen, Calvados.
Eglintoun	United Kingdom	The brig was driven ashore and wrecked at Ballyferris Point, County Down. She was on a voyage from Troon, Ayrshire to Belfast, County Antrim.
Eliza	United Kingdom	The schooner was driven ashore and wrecked at Ballyferris Point. She was on a voyage from Troon to Dublin.
Grecian	United Kingdom	The ship was driven wrecked on a reef east of Hartland Point, Devon with the loss of all hands.
Iris	Belgium	The ship was driven ashore on Ameland, Friesland, Netherlands. Her crew were rescued. She was on a voyage from Saint Petersburg, Russia to Ghent.
James Andus	United Kingdom	The ship ran aground on the Sandhammer Reef, off Ystad, Sweden. Her crew were rescued. She was on a voyage from Saint Petersburg to Hull, Yorkshire. James was refloated on 16 January 1841 and taken into Ystad.
Lady Newman	United Kingdom	The ship was driven ashore and wrecked on Faial Island, Azores. Her crew were rescued. She was on a voyage from the Azores to an English port.
Leonidas	United Kingdom	The ship was abandoned in the Atlantic Ocean. Her crew were rescued by Columbus (United Kingdom). Leonidas was on a voyage from Quebec City, Lower Canada, British North America to Liverpool, Lancashire.
Mercurius	Denmark	The ship collided with Sara Ann Cornelia (Netherlands) and sank in the North Sea. She was on a voyage from Hull to Altona.
Speedy	United Kingdom	The ship was driven ashore in St Aubins Bay, Jersey. She was on a voyage from Liverpoolto Jersey. Speedy was refloated on 23 November.
Susannah	United Kingdom	The ship was driven ashore at Bangor, County Down.
Union	United Kingdom	The ship was wrecked on the Mount Stone, off the coast of Devon with the loss of four of her five crew. She was on a voyage from Southampton, Hampshire to Newport, Monmouthshire.
William	United Kingdom	The brig was driven ashore and wrecked east of Dieppe, Seine-Inférieure, France with the loss of a crew member. She was on a voyage from Sunderland to Caen.
William and Ellen	United Kingdom	The sloop was driven ashore and wrecked at Beadnell, Northumberland. Her crew were rescued. She was on a voyage from Grangemouth, Stirlingshire to Newcastle upon Tyne, Northumberland.

== 22 November ==
List of shipwrecks: 22 November 1840
Ship	State	Description
Belinda	United Kingdom	The barque was abandoned in the Atlantic Ocean. Her crew were rescued by Rhône (France). Bolinda was on a voyage from Troon, Ayrshire to Malta.
Catherine	United Kingdom	The steamship was driven ashore and wrecked at Margate, Kent.
City of Londonderry	United Kingdom	The steamship foundered off Margate. She was on a voyage from Havre de Grâce, Seine-Inférieure, France to London.
Cyrus	United Kingdom	The ship was driven ashore at Sheringham, Norfolk. Her crew were rescued. She was on a voyage from Newcastle upon Tyne, Northumberland to Plymouth, Devon. Cyrus was refloated on 30 November and taken into Wells-next-the-Sea, Norfolk.
Equivalent	United Kingdom	The brig was wrecked on the Margate Sand, in the North Sea off the coast of Kent. Her nine crew were rescued by Devonshire (United Kingdom). She floated off and came ashore at Deal, Kent the next day.
Felicity	United Kingdom	The ship was run down and sunk off Corton, Suffolk. Her crew were rescued. She was on a voyage from London to Goole, Yorkshire.
Holcombe	United Kingdom	The ketch was in collision with John (United Kingdom) and sank in the North Sea 8 nautical miles (15 km) north north west of Lowestoft, Suffolk. Her crew were rescued.
Hope	United Kingdom	The ship was driven ashore and wrecked at Scarborough, Yorkshire.
Hope	United Kingdom	The ship was driven ashore and wrecked south of Great Yarmouth, Norfolk. Her crew were rescued.
John Read	United Kingdom	The ship was driven ashore near Dunkirk, Nord, France. She was on a voyage from Southampton, Hampshire to Sunderland, County Durham. John Read was refloated on 24 November and taken into Dunkirk.
Kaimes	United Kingdom	The sloop was driven ashore and wrecked at Spittal, Northumberland with the loss of all hands. She was on a voyage from Elie, Fife to Glasgow, Renfrewshire.
Mary	United Kingdom	The brig was wrecked on the Sunk Sand, in the North Sea off the coast of Essex with the loss of all but her captain. She was on a voyage from Newcastle upon Tyne to London.
Mary Anne	United States	The ship was wrecked near Ragged Island, Bahamas. She was on a voyage from Charleston, South Carolina to Ragged Island.
Nathaniel	United Kingdom	The ship was driven ashore and wrecked at Yarmouth, Isle of Wight. Her crew were rescued.
Oak	United Kingdom	The sloop was driven ashore at Caister-on-Sea, Norfolk with the loss of two of the five people on board. She was on a voyage from London to Selby, Yorkshire. She was refloated on 1 December and taken into Great Yarmouth.
Pericles	United Kingdom	The ship was wrecked on the Sunk Sand. Her crew were rescued. She was on a voyage from Newcastle upon Tyne to London.
Prince Regent	United Kingdom	The brig was driven ashore at St. Ives, Cornwall.
Royal Packet	United Kingdom	The ship was driven ashore at Grimsby, Lincolnshire. She was on a voyage from London to Sunderland.
Ruby	United Kingdom	The ship was driven ashore at Horsey, Norfolk.
Sally	United Kingdom	The ship was wrecked on the Sunk Sand. She was on a voyage from South Shields, County Durham to London.
Sarah	United Kingdom	The ship was wrecked on the Sunk Sand. Her crew survived. She was on a voyage from Stockton-on-Tees, County Durham to London.
Spartan	United Kingdom	The ship was wrecked off Harbour Island, Florida Territory. Her crew were rescued. She was on a voyage from Liverpool, Lancashire to Havana, Cuba.
St. Rolex	United Kingdom	The ship was driven ashore at Caister-on-Sea. Her crew were rescued. She was on a voyage from London to Glasgow, Renfrewshire.
Success	United Kingdom	The ship was driven ashore and wrecked at Trimingham, Norfolk. Her crew were rescued by the Coast Guard using rocket apparatus and the Mundesley Lifeboat. She was on a voyage from Newcastle upon Tyne to a French port.
Thetis	Netherlands	The ship was abandoned and was subsequently wrecked on the Whitings. She was on a voyage from Rotterdam, South Holland to Borgå, Grand Duchy of Finland.
Thomas	United Kingdom	The ship was wrecked on the Sunk Sand. Six of her eight crew were rescued by the Barking smack Friends (United Kingdom); the other two were left on board.
Tresore	United Kingdom	The ship was wrecked on the Sunk Sand. Her crew survived.
Udney	United Kingdom	The ship was driven onto the West Rocks, Harwich, Essex and was damaged. She was on a voyage from Perth to London. Udney was later refloated and beached.
United Kingdom	United Kingdom	The ship was driven ashore at Great Yarmouth. Her crew were rescued.
Utile	United Kingdom	The ship was driven ashore at Margate, Kent. She was on a voyage from London to St. Ubes, Portugal.
Vesper	United Kingdom	The ship was wrecked on the Sunk Sand.
Venus	Belgium	The ship was driven ashore and wrecked between "Fas" and "Holln". She was on a voyage from the Grand Duchy of Finland to Marseille, Bouches-du-Rhône.
Vine	United Kingdom	The ship was driven ashore at Grimsby, Lincolnshire. She was on a voyage from Wisbech, Cambridgeshire to Seaham, County Durham. Vine was refloated on 11 December.
William	United Kingdom	The ship was wrecked on the Sunk Sand with the loss of two of her crew. She was on a voyage from North Shields, County Durham to London.

== 23 November ==
List of shipwrecks: 23 November 1840
Ship	State	Description
Claudine	United Kingdom	Claudine and Westminster (background). The ship was driven ashore at Margate, Kent. She was on a voyage from Madras, India to London. Claudine was refloated on 9 December and towed to the River Thames. She was repaired and returned to service.
Diadem	United Kingdom	The barque was driven ashore and wrecked at Beckhithe, Norfolk. Her crew had been rescued by fishing smacks before she came ashore.
Elizabeth	United Kingdom	The brig was driven ashore 6 nautical miles (11 km) east of Calais, France. She was on a voyage from Newcastle upon Tyne, Northumberland to London.
Equivalent	United Kingdom	The ship was driven ashore at Kingsgate, Kent.
Farewell	United Kingdom	The barque was driven ashore on Læsø, Denmark. She was on a voyage from Liverpool, Lancashire to Königsberg, Prussia. Farewell was refloated and resumed her voyage.
Galway Lass	United Kingdom	The ship ran aground off North Foreland, Kent and capsized. Her crew were rescued. She was subsequently driven onto the Sandwich Flats and sank. Galway Lass was refloated on 10 December and taken into Ramsgate, Kent for repairs.
Jason	United Kingdom	The ship was driven ashore and wrecked at Sheringham, Norfolk with the loss of four of her six crew.
John Reid	United Kingdom	The schooner was driven ashore at Dunkirk, Nord. She was on a voyage from Southampton, Hampshire to Sunderland, County Durham.
Leander	United Kingdom	The ship was driven ashore and wrecked at Cromer, Norfolk. She was on a voyage from Seaham, County Durham to London.
Mary Ann	United States	The ship was wrecked on Harbour Island, Florida Territory. She was on a voyage from Charleston, South Carolina to Ragged Island, Bahamas.
Pailas	Sweden	The ship was wrecked in the Bay of Sote with the loss of all hands. She was on a voyage from Torrevecchia Teatina, Kingdom of the Two Sicilies to Gothenburg.
Poule	France	The ship was wrecked on the coast of Pas-de-Calais. Her crew were rescued. She was on a voyage from Naples, Kingdom of the Two Sicilies to Dunkirk, Nord.
Silva	United Kingdom	The ship was in collision with the brig Hebe (United Kingdom) and was abandoned in the North Sea off Great Yarmouth. Her crew were rescued by Hebe. Silva was on a voyage from Goole, Yorkshire to London.
Supply	United Kingdom	The ship was driven ashore between Mundesley and Sheringham. She was on a voyage from Newcastle upon Tyne, Northumberland to a French port.
Twende Brodre	Sweden	The ship was wrecked near Strömstad. Her crew were rescued. She was on a voyage from London to Stockholm.
Westminster	United Kingdom	The ship was driven ashore at Margate. She was refloated on 7 December and towed into Gravesend, Kent.

== 24 November ==
List of shipwrecks: 24 November 1840
Ship	State	Description
Ann	United Kingdom	The ship ran aground on the Bull Sand, in the North Sea and was damaged. She was refloated and taken into Grimsby, Lincolnshire in a sinking condition. Ann was on a voyage from South Shields, County Durham to London.
Brothers	(United Kingdom of Great Britain and Ireland) British North America	The ship was driven ashore in Deadman's Bay. Her crew were rescued.
Catherina	United Kingdom	The ship was driven ashore at Margate, Kent. She was on a voyage from Trieste to London.
Felicity	United Kingdom	The ship was run down and sunk in the North Sea off Great Yarmouth, Norfolk. Her crew were rescued.
Fort Sattningen	Sweden	The ship was beached north of Visby. She was on a voyage from St. Ubes, Portugal to Stockholm.
Gipsy	(United Kingdom of Great Britain and Ireland) Antigua	The drogher sloop was driven ashore on Antigua. She was later refloated and taken into St. John's for repairs.
Good Intent	United Kingdom	The sloop ran aground at Alnmouth, Northumberland. She was on a voyage from Alnmouth to Cambus, Clackmannanshire.
Herman	(Russian Empire) Grand Duchy of Finland	The ship was driven ashore and wrecked near Hjørring, Denmark. Her crew were rescued. She was on a voyage from Bordeaux, Gironde, France to Helsinki.
Hillsborough	(United Kingdom of Great Britain and Ireland) British North America	The ship was driven ashore at Outer Cove, Newfoundland. Her crew were rescued.
Inverness	United Kingdom	The ship was driven ashore at Lowestoft, Suffolk.
Jasper	United Kingdom	The ship struck rocks in Crow Sound and was damaged. She put into St. Mary's, Isles of Scilly.
John Munro	United Kingdom	The ship ran aground on the Newcombe Sand, in the North Sea off the coast of Norfolk and capsized with the loss of all but her captain.
Mercurius	Hamburg	The ship collided with Sarah Anna Cornelia (Netherlands) and sank in the North Sea. Her crew were rescued. She was on a voyage from Newcastle upon Tyne, Northumberland, United Kingdom to Altona.
Plato	United Kingdom	The ship ran aground on a reef off "Flat River", British North America and was damaged. She was on a voyage from Richibucto, New Brunswick, British North America to Exmouth, Devon. Plato was refloated and taken to Prince Edward Island, British North America.
HMS Spey	Royal Navy	The Cruizer-class brig-sloop was wrecked on a reef in the Bahama Channel. All on board were rescued. She was on a voyage from Falmouth, Cornwall to Havana, Cuba, Belize City, British Honduras and Mexico.
Salacia	United Kingdom	The ship sank at Great Yarmouth, Norfolk.
Viscount Melbourne	United Kingdom	The brig was driven ashore at "Nybra", Sweden. She was on a voyage from Hartlepool, County Durham to Pillau, Prussia.

== 25 November ==
List of shipwrecks: 25 November 1840
Ship	State	Description
Ann	United Kingdom	The ship ran aground on the Bull Sand, in the North Sea and was damaged. She was on a voyage from South Shields, County Durham to London. Ann was later refloated and taken into Grimsby, Lincolnshire in a sinking condition.
Black Boy	United Kingdom	The brig ran aground on the Lemon and Ower Sand, in the North Sea. She was refloated and towed into Great Yarmouth, Norfolk by HMRC Badger ( Board of Customs). Black Boy was on a voyage from Stockton-on-Tees, County Durham to Hamburg.
Elfe	Russia	The barque was lost near Bolderāja with the loss of all hands. She was on a voyage from Lisbon, Portugal to a Russian port.
Henry Briggs	United Kingdom	The ship was wrecked on the Conflict Sand, in the Gambia River.
Matchless	United Kingdom	The ship was driven ashore and wrecked in the Gambia River. She was on a voyage from London to Bathurst.
Udney Castle	United Kingdom	The brig was wrecked in Table Bay with the loss of a crew member. She was on a voyage from Liverpool, Lancashire to Cape Town and Mauritius.

== 26 November ==
List of shipwrecks: 26 November 1840
Ship	State	Description
Eliza	United Kingdom	The sloop was driven ashore and damaged at Rattray Head, Aberdeenshire, her crew having abandoned her off that headland. She was on a voyage from Bonar Bridge, Sutherlands to Sunderland, County Durham. Eliza was later refloated and towed into Fraserburgh.
Frances Lawson	United Kingdom	The ship was abandoned in the Atlantic Ocean. Her crew were rescued by Cornwall (United Kingdom). Frances Lawson was on a voyage from Pictou, Nova Scotia, British North America to Liverpool, Lancashire.
Limæs or Linnea	Sweden	The ship was wrecked on Gotland. She was on a voyage from Gävle to Hull, Yorkshire, United Kingdom.
Patrick	(United Kingdom of Great Britain and Ireland) British North America	The ship was wrecked on Malden Island, Newfoundland. She was on a voyage from Portugal to Carbonear, Newfoundland.
Sunbeam	United Kingdom	The steamship was in collision with British Dominion (United Kingdom) and sank in the north Sea off Middlesbrough, Yorkshire.
Venus	United Kingdom	The ship was driven ashore and wrecked west of Kolberg, Prussia. Her crew were rescued. She was on a voyage from Riga, Russia to Hull.

== 27 November ==
List of shipwrecks: 27 November 1840
Ship	State	Description
Cunningham	United Kingdom	The brig was driven ashore and wrecked on Zea, Greece with the loss of a crew member. She was on a voyage from Kertch, Russia to Falmouth, Cornwall.
Juffer Wendelina	Netherlands	The ship was driven ashore near Cherbourg, Seine-Inférieure, France. Her crew were rescued. She was on a voyage from Cardiff, Glamorgan, United Kingdom to Rotterdam, South Holland.
Pero	United Kingdom	The ship capsized at Plymouth, Devon and was severely damaged.
Sarah	United Kingdom	The ship foundered in the North Sea off the north coast of Kent.
St. Louis	Spain	The ship was lost near Havana, Cuba.
Venus	United Kingdom	The ship was driven ashore and wrecked near Kolberg. Her crew were rescued. She was on a voyage from Riga, Russia to Hull, Yorkshire.
William	United Kingdom	The ship foundered in the Dogger Bank. Her crew were rescued by George (United Kingdom) was on a voyage from Kiel, Prussia to London.

== 28 November ==
List of shipwrecks: 28 November 1840
Ship	State	Description
Britannia	United Kingdom	The ship was abandoned in the Atlantic Ocean. Her crew were rescued by Ville de Lyon (France). Britannia was on a voyage from Miramichi, New Brunswick, British North America to Newcastle upon Tyne, Northumberland.
Caledonia	United Kingdom	The ship was wrecked near Arichat, Nova Scotia, British North America. She was on a voyage from Quebec City, Lower Canada to Liverpool, Lancashire.
Eden	United Kingdom	The ship ran aground on the Herd Sand, in the North Sea off the coast of County Durham. She put back to North Shields for repairs.
Fame	United Kingdom	The schooner was driven ashore and damaged at Boulmer, Northumberland. She was refloated on 9 December and towed into Blyth, Northumberland for repairs.
Farewell	United Kingdom	The ship ran aground at Pillau, Prussia. She was on a voyage from Liverpool to Pillau.Farewell was refloated
Flora	Denmark	The ship was driven ashore and wrecked at "Kohl", Sweden.
Helen Sharpe	United Kingdom	The schooner was wrecked on the Bondicar Rocks, off Amble, Northumberland. Her crew were rescued.
Joseph	(United Kingdom of Great Britain and Ireland) Guernsey	The ship was in collision with Kleine Hermann ( Stettin) off the Am Stettiner Haff and was consequently beached. She was on a voyage from Swinemünde, Prussia to Guernsey. Joseph was refloated and taken into Swindemünde.
Old Maid	United Kingdom	The brig was abandoned in the Atlantic Ocean (46°08′N 42°56′W). Eight of her fourteen crew were rescued by Lady Gordon (United Kingdom); the other six by the barque Port Glasgow (United Kingdom). Old Maid was on a voyage from Quebec City to Great Yarmouth, Norfolk.
William and Helen	United Kingdom	The sloop was driven ashore and wrecked at Beadnell, Northumberland. Her crew were rescued. She was on a voyage from Grangemouth, Stirlingshire to Newcastle upon Tyne, Northumberland.

== 29 November ==
List of shipwrecks: 29 November 1840
Ship	State	Description
Despatch	United Kingdom	The ship was abandoned in the Atlantic Ocean with the loss of a crew member. Survivors were rescued by Stephen Whitby (United Kingdom). Despatch was on a voyage from Boston, Massachusetts to Saint John's, Newfoundland, British North America.
Economy	United Kingdom	The barque was abandoned in the Atlantic Ocean. Her crew were rescued by British Tar (United Kingdom). Economy was on a voyage from Quebec City, Lower Canada, British North America to Newcastle upon Tyne, Northumberland.
Emma	United Kingdom	The Barking smack was run down and sunk in the North Sea off Harwich, Essex by City of Aberdeen (United Kingdom). Her crew were rescued by City of Aberdeen.
General Stockton	United Kingdom	The brig was driven ashore and wrecked at Perranzabuloe, Cornwall with the loss of all hands.
Lykken	Norway	The ship was destroyed by fire off "Filfoed". She was on a voyage from Drammen to Christiana.
Magicienne	French Navy	The frigate was wrecked on the Bombay Shoal, in the Palawan Passage. Her crew reached Palawan, Spanish East Indies. They were rescued on 2 December by Clifford, Mysore (both United Kingdom) and Favourite (France). Magicienne was on a voyage from Singapore to Manila, Spanish East Indies.

== 30 November ==
List of shipwrecks: 30 November 1840
Ship	State	Description
Blucher	United Kingdom	The ship foundered in the Bay of Biscay. Her crew were rescued by Felix (United Kingdom).
Childe Harold	United Kingdom	The ship ran aground on the Quarries, in the Orkney Islands. She was on a voyage from Wick, Caithness to Limerick. Childe Harold was refloated the next day.
Consolation	United Kingdom	The ship was driven ashore and wrecked at Clifden, County Galway with the loss of all hands. She was on a voyage from Tralee, County Kerry to Liverpool, Lancashire.
Emerald	United Kingdom	The schooner was driven ashore and wrecked on Sanda Island, Argyllshire. She was on a voyage from Liverpool to Bordeaux, Gironde, France.
London	United Kingdom	The schooner was driven ashore at Sheringham, Norfolk. She was on a voyage from Aberdeen to London. She was refloated and resumed her voyage.
Swinemünde	Prussia	The ship ran aground on the Stevn Klint. She was on a voyage from Memel to Grangemouth, Stirlingshire, United Kingdom.

== Unknown date ==
List of shipwrecks: Unknown date in November 1840
Ship	State	Description
Albion	United Kingdom	The ship was driven ashore on Læsø, Denmark. She was on a voyage from Saint Petersburg, Russia to London. Albion was refloated and taken into Copenhagen, Denmark, where she arrived on 24 November.
Amphion	Flag unknown	The ship was wrecked on the coast of "Paglia". She was on a voyage from Hamburg to Gibraltar and Trieste.
Caledonia	United Kingdom	The steamship foundered whilst towing a French barque from "St. Katherine's" to Havre de Grâce, Seine-Inférieure, France. The barque was presumed to have also foundered.
Catherine Caroline	United Kingdom	The ship was driven ashore at Dragør, Denmark. She was on a voyage from Bridgwater, Somerset to Greifswald. She was refloated and taken into Copenhagen, where she arrived on 26 November.
Celestine	France	The ship was abandoned whilst on a voyage from La Rochelle, Charente-Maritime to London. She was towed into the Île de Seine on 1 December.
Clarence	United Kingdom	The ship foundered in the North Sea off the north coast of Kent. She was on a voyage from Saint Petersburg to London.
Economy	United Kingdom	The barque was abandoned in the Atlantic Ocean.
Flora	Prussia	The galiot was driven ashore and wrecked near "Kohl", Sweden.
Geirtrude	Duchy of Holstein	The ship was driven ashore and wrecked near Boulogne, Pas-de-Calais, France on or before 12 November. She was on a voyage from Cádiz to Tønning.
General	United Kingdom	The ship was wrecked off "Perrow" with the loss of all hands.
Hannah	(United Kingdom of Great Britain and Ireland) New South Wales	The schooner was driven ashore and wrecked at South Head, Port Jackson.
Iduna	Norway	The ship sank off Stavanger. She was on a voyage from St. Ubes, Portugal to Egersund. Iduna was refloated in June 1841 and towed into Kobervig.
Joachim	Austrian Empire	The brig was wrecked in the Bay of Biscay. Her thirteen crew were rescued by Argyle (United Kingdom).
Lise Chérie	France	The ship was driven ashore near Calais. She was on a voyage from Saint Petersburg to Dunkirk, Nord. Lise Chérie was refloated on 7 November and taken into Calais.
Luna	United Kingdom	The ship was driven ashore at Mockbeggar, Cheshire. She was refloated on 10 November and taken into Liverpool, Lancashire.
Mary	United Kingdom	The ship departed from South Shields, County Durham before 13 November bound for Dunkirk, Nord, France. No further trace, presumed foundered with the loss of all hands.
Myrtle	(United Kingdom of Great Britain and Ireland) British North America	The barque was abandoned in the Atlantic OCean 40 nautical miles (74 km) south of Table Island on or before 30 November.
Prince Coburg	United Kingdom	The ship was abandoned in the Atlantic Ocean on or before 23 November.
Silon	United Kingdom	The ship foundered in the North Sea off the coast of Suffolk on or before 29 November.
Stovit	United Kingdom	The ship was abandoned in the North Sea before 24 November.
Thetis	Netherlands	The ship was abandoned in the North Sea before 22 November. She was on a voyage from Rotterdam, South Holland to Bergen, Norway. She was subsequently wrecked on the Whitings.
Vigilant	United Kingdom	The ship was abandoned in the North Sea. She was towed into Heligoland in a waterlogged condition but broke up on 24 November.
Zephyr	United Kingdom	The barque was abandoned in the Atlantic Ocean before 1 December.
