= Deadman's Bay =

Deadman's Bay may refer to:

- Deadman's Bay, Newfoundland and Labrador, Canada, a community
- Deadman's Bay (Newfoundland and Labrador), Canada, a natural bay
