= List of shipwrecks in April 1870 =

The list of shipwrecks in April 1870 includes ships sunk, foundered, grounded, or otherwise lost during April 1870.

== 1 April ==
List of shipwrecks: 1 April 1870
Ship	State	Description
Favourite	New Zealand	The 59-ton paddle steamer ran aground and was wrecked at Ahipara, New Zealand, during a gale.
Hebe	Russia	The barque was wrecked in the Black Sea with the loss of twelve of her sixteen crew. She was on a voyage from Odesa to an English port.
Lovett	United Kingdom	The full-rigged ship was driven ashore on Inishtrahull, County Donegal with the loss of four lives. She was on a voyage from Greenock, Renfrewshire to Saint John's, Newfoundland Colony. She was refloated and taken in to Lough Foyle.
Sovereign	United Kingdom	The steamship was driven ashore near Dulas, Anglesey. Her passengers were taken off. She was on a voyage from Liverpool, Lancashire to Bristol, Gloucestershire.
Tiger	United Kingdom	The schooner was driven ashore at Belfast, County Antrim. She was refloated.

== 2 April ==
List of shipwrecks: 2 April 1870
Ship	State	Description
Carleton	United Kingdom	The ship foundered in the Atlantic Ocean. Her crew reached the Irish coast in two boats. She was on a voyage from the Clyde to Quebec City, Canada.
Henrietta	United Kingdom	The brig sprang a leak and sank in the North Sea off Bridlington, Yorkshire. She was on a voyage from Sunderland, County Durham to London.
Sarah	United Kingdom	The schooner struck the Bishop's Rock and sank. Her crew were rescued. She was on a voyage from Liverpool, Lancashire to Plymouth, Devon.
Tonsberg	United Kingdom	The ship collided with Queen of the Clyde (United Kingdom in the Saint Lawrence River and was beached. She was on a voyage from London to Quebec City.

== 3 April ==
List of shipwrecks: 3 April 1870
Ship	State	Description
Alexander	United Kingdom	The ship collided with Ino (Flag unknown) and sank off Heligoland. She was on a voyage from Hartlepool, County Durham to Hamburg.
Bengal	United Kingdom	The ship was driven ashore west of Hiogo Point, Japan. She was refloated.
Bromsgrove	United Kingdom	The steamship ran aground at Sunderland, County Durham. She was on a voyage from Sunderland to Southampton, Hampshire. She was refloated.
Frankland	United Kingdom	The steamship ran aground at Sunderland. She was on a voyage from Sunderland to Hamburg. She was refloated.
Harraton	United Kingdom	The steamship ran aground at Sunderland. She was on a voyage from Sunderland to Hamburg.
Henrietta	United Kingdom	The ship foundered in the North Sea off Flamborough Head, Yorkshire. Her crew were rescued. She was on a voyage from Sunderland, County Durham to London.
Unnamed	United Kingdom	The schooner was driven ashore at Sunderland. She was refloated.

== 4 April ==
List of shipwrecks: 4 April 1870
Ship	State	Description
Fifeshire	United Kingdom	The schooner collided with the brig Landscape (United Kingdom) and sank in the North Sea 8 nautical miles (15 km) off Dimlington, Yorkshire. Her crew were rescued by Landscape. Fifeshire was on a voyage from South Shields, County Durham to Rochester, Kent.
Flying Cloud	(United Kingdom of Great Britain and Ireland) South Australia	The ship was wrecked near Port MacDonnell. Her crew were rescued. She was on a voyage from Mauritius to Adelaide.
Lübec	Lübeck	The steamship was driven ashore at the Staberhuk Lighthouse, Fehmarn, Prussia. She was on a voyage from Lübeck to Gothenburg, Sweden. She was refloated and taken in to Burgtiefe, Prussia.

== 5 April ==
List of shipwrecks: 5 April 1870
Ship	State	Description
HMS Pert	Royal Navy	The Cheerful-class gunboat was driven ashore on the African coast. Subsequently refloated, repaired and returned to service.
Queen	United Kingdom	The passenger ship ran aground at Sandy Hook, New Jersey, United States. She was on a voyage from Liverpool, Lancashire to New York, United States. She was refloated with the assistance of tugs on 7 April and completed her voyage.

== 6 April ==
List of shipwrecks: 6 April 1870
Ship	State	Description
East	India	The ship ran aground on the Fultah Sand. She was on a voyage from Kurrachee to Calcutta. She was refloated and completed her voyage.
Galveston	United States	The ship was wrecked at Nassau, Bahamas. She was on a voyage from Galveston, Texas, to Liverpool, Lancashire, United Kingdom.
Harvard	United Kingdom	The steamship struck Cromwell's Rock, off Waterford and sank. Her crew survived. She was on a voyage from Huelva, Spain to Glasgow, Renfrewshire.

== 7 April ==
List of shipwrecks: 7 April 1870
Ship	State	Description
Athalia	United Kingdom	The ship ran aground on the Robin Rigg, in the Irish Sea off the coast of Cumberland. She was on a voyage from Caernarfon to Glasgow, Renfrewshire. She was refloated and beached at Beckfoot.
Caroline	United Kingdom	The ship ran aground on Cephalonia, Greece. She was on a voyage from Bahia, Brazil to Venice, Italy. She was refloated and resumed her voyage in a leaky condition.

== 8 April ==
List of shipwrecks: 8 April 1870
Ship	State	Description
Admiral Napier	United Kingdom	The brig was scuttled. She was on a voyage from Aberdeen to London. He captain was charged with unlawfully scuttling the ship as part of an insurance fraud.
Agnes	United Kingdom	The ship was wrecked on the coast of County Donegal with the loss of four lives. She was on a voyage from Saint John's, Newfoundland Colony to the Clyde.
Lyman Cann	United Kingdom	The barque ran aground on Earl's Rock, in the Carlingford Lough. She was on a voyage from Saint John's to Warrenpoint, County Antrim.
Paranaes	Brazil	The steamship was wrecked at Ceará.
Polly	New Zealand	The 12-ton cutter was destroyed by fire at Whangaruru.
Tyne	United Kingdom	The schooner was driven ashore on Papa Westray, Orkney Islands. She was on a voyage from the Balta Sound to the Clyde. She was refloated and taken in to port in a leaky condition.

== 9 April ==
List of shipwrecks: 9 April 1870
Ship	State	Description
Choice	United Kingdom	The ship ran aground on the Cork Sand, in the North Sea off the coast of Suffolk. She was on a voyage from Whitby, Yorkshire to London. She was refloated the next day and assisted in the Harwich, Essex.
Francisco Jeune	France	The schooner was severely damaged by an onboard explosion at Penarth, Glamorgan, United Kingdom. Three crew were severely wounded.
Maormer	United Kingdom	The steamship ran aground at Sunderland, County Durham. She was refloated with assistance from the tug Pilot (United Kingdom).
Nile	United Kingdom	The steamship ran aground in Lake Timsah, Egypt. She was on a voyage from London to Singapore, Strait Settlements. She was refloated on 12 April and resumed her voyage on 15 April.
Star of Hope	United Kingdom	The ship collided with the barque Archos (United Kingdom) and sank 14 nautical miles (26 km) off Lowestoft, Suffolk. Her crew were rescued by the pilot cutter Rapid (United Kingdom). Star of Hope was on a voyage from South Shields, County Durham to Cartagena, Spain.

== 10 April ==
List of shipwrecks: 10 April 1870
Ship	State	Description
Bacchante	United Kingdom	The ship sprang a leak and was beached at the Manora Point Lighthouse, India, where she was wrecked. She was abandoned by her crew two days later. She was on a voyage from Kurrachee, India to Liverpool, Lancashire.
Optima	United Kingdom	The barque collided with the barque Ville d'Anvers (Belgium) and sank off "Cape Doro", Greece. Her crew were rescued. Optima was on a voyage from South Shields, County Durham to Odesa, Russian Empire.

== 11 April ==
List of shipwrecks: 11 April 1870
Ship	State	Description
Bloomer	United Kingdom	The ship was driven ashore at Maryport, Cumberland.
Blossom	United Kingdom	The ship was driven ashore near Hellebæk, Denmark. She was on a voyage from Burntisland, Fife to Danzig. She was refloated.
Fox	United Kingdom	The steamship ran aground at Whitby, Yorkshire. She was on a voyage from a French port to Middlesbrough, Yorkshire.
Hermann and Eugene	Norway	The schooner ran aground on the Goodwin Sands, Kent, United Kingdom.
John and Ellen	United Kingdom	The Humber Keel was run down and sunk at Goole, Yorkshire by the steamship Charente (Flag unknown) with the loss of one life.
John Ferguson	United Kingdom	The ship was wrecked on the Isla de Aves, Venezuela. Her crew were rescued by Storm King (United States). John Ferguson was on a voyage from Trinidad to Greenock, Renfrewshire.
Ryhope	United Kingdom	The steamship ran aground at Cuxhaven. She was on a voyage from Sunderland, County Durham to Cuxhaven. She was refloated.
Senator Iken	United Kingdom	The ship was driven ashore on Lundy Island, Devon with the loss of a crew member. She was on a voyage from Cardiff, Glamorgan to Hong Kong. She was refloated and put back to Cardiff.
Three Sisters	United Kingdom	The ship ran aground at Alexandria, Virginia, United States. She was on a voyage from Liverpool, Lancashire to Alexandria.

== 12 April ==
List of shipwrecks: 12 April 1870
Ship	State	Description
Alphonse Corrina	France	The schooner ran aground on the Arklow Bank, in the Irish Sea off the coast of County Wicklow, United Kingdom and sank. Her five crew survived. She was on a voyage from Glasgow, Renfrewshire, United Kingdom to the Île Bourbon.
Anglia	United Kingdom	The steamship ran aground in the Clyde. She was on a voyage from the Clyde to New York, United States. She was refloated, but ran aground again and was refloated a second time.
HMS Blanche	Royal Navy	HMS Blanche The Eclipse-class sloop ran aground off New Hanover Island. Subsequently refloated, repaired and returned to service.
Francisca	United Kingdom	The ship was damaged by an onboard explosion at Penarth, Glamorgan.

== 13 April ==
List of shipwrecks: 13 April 1870
Ship	State	Description
Ailsa	United Kingdom	The steamship ran aground at Greenock, Renfrewshire. She was on a voyage from Greenock to Bristol, Gloucestershire.
Paul Eva	France	The brig was wrecked in the Islas Maxeres, Mexico.
Success	United Kingdom	The trow foundered in the Bristol Channel off Steep Holm. She was on a voyage from Gloucester to Highbridge, Somerset.

== 14 April ==
List of shipwrecks: 14 April 1870
Ship	State	Description
Nathatka	Russia	The steamship was wrecked off the coast of Korea. She was on a voyage from Niuzhuang, China to Yokohama, Japan.

== 15 April ==
List of shipwrecks: 15 April 1870
Ship	State	Description
Christiania	United Kingdom	The schooner struck rocks off the Longships Lighthouse, Cornwall and sank. Her crew were rescued. She was on a voyage from Newport, Monmouthshire to Plymouth, Devon.
Dorset	United Kingdom	The steamship struck the Tuskar Rock and sank. Her crew were rescued. She was on a voyage from Porthcawl, Glamorgan to Highbridge, Somerset.
New York	Bremen	The steamship was driven ashore at Fécamp, Seine-Inférieure, France. She was on a voyage from Bremen to New York, United States. She was refloated and taken in to Havre de Grâce, Seine-Inférieure for repairs.

== 16 April ==
List of shipwrecks: 16 April 1870
Ship	State	Description
Balmoral	United Kingdom	The ship collided with the steamship Edith Owen (United Kingdom) and sank off Start Point, Devon. Her crew were rescued by Edith Owen. Balmoral was on a voyage from South Shields, County Durham to Ferrol, Spain.
Barbara	Netherlands	The schooner collided with the steamship Petersburg (United Kingdom) and was abandoned off the Isles of Scilly. All eight people on board were rescued by Petersburg. Barbara was on a voyage from Seville, Spain to Bremen.
C. H. Catherine	United Kingdom	The schooner foundered off Land's End, Cornwall. Her crew were rescued.
General Lee	United Kingdom	The fishing boat was driven ashore and wrecked in Whitsand Bay.
Luna	Flag unknown	The schooner was driven ashore at Cádiz, Spain. She was refloated.
Yankee	United Kingdom	The steamship collided with the partially open swing bridge and sank in the River Ouse at Selby, Yorkshire. She was on a voyage from Goole to Selby. She was refloated on 19 April and taken in to Goole for repairs.
Unnamed	Portugal	The mistico was driven ashore and wrecked at Cádiz.
Two unnamed vessels	Spain	The schooners were driven ashore at Cádiz.

== 17 April ==
List of shipwrecks: 17 April 1870
Ship	State	Description
Avoca	United Kingdom	The steamship ran aground on the Maplin Sand, in the North Sea off the coast of Essex. She was on a voyage from London to Dublin.
Clara Morse	United States	The full-rigged ship ran aground on reefs north west of Bermuda and was wrecked. She was on a voyage from Savannah, Georgia, to Liverpool, Lancashire, United Kingdom.
Elizabeth	Spain	The barque ran aground on a reef off "Princes Island". She was on a voyage from Manila, Spanish East Indies to Liverpool.
Hope	United Kingdom	The brig was wrecked on the Gunfleet Sand, in the North Sea off the coast of Essex. Her crew were rescued. She was on a voyage from Newcastle upon Tyne, Northumberland to Rochester, Kent.
John Norman	United Kingdom	The full-rigged ship ran aground at Exmouth, Devon and was severely damaged. She was on a voyage from South Shields, County Durham to Exmouth. She was refloated.
Magdala	United Kingdom	The steamship ran aground on the Longships, Cornwall. She was on a voyage from Liverpool to China. She was refloated and put in to Falmouth, Cornwall.
Mondego	Portugal	The steamship sank in the Tagus.
Nina	United Kingdom	The steamship ran aground on the Maplin Sand. She was on a voyage from London to Swansea, Glamorgan.
Wild Wave	United Kingdom	The ship was driven ashore near Donaghadee, County Down. She was on a voyage from Maryport, Cumberland to Belfast, County Antrim.
Unnamed	Flag unknown	The brig was driven ashore near Donaghadee. She was refloated.

== 18 April ==
List of shipwrecks: 18 April 1870
Ship	State	Description
Catharina	Flag unknown	The schooner sank at Lisbon, Portugal. She was later refloated but was consequently condemned.
Due Sorelle	Italy	The ship was driven ashore at Gibraltar. She was on a voyage from Livorno to Liverpool, Lancashire, United Kingdom. She subsequently broke up.
Harriet	United Kingdom	The smack was wrecked between Catterline and Stonehaven, Aberdeenshire. She was on a voyage from London to Montrose, Forfarshire.
Jane and Sophie	Denmark	The ship was wrecked on the Elbow End Sand, at the mouth of the River Tay with the loss of all hands, five or six lives.
Solleftea	Sweden	The ship was lost near Lemvig, Denmark. She was on a voyage from Cagliari, Sardinia, Italy to Helsingør, Denmark.
Tarifa	United Kingdom	The steamship was driven ashore at Queenstown, County Cork, United Kingdom. She was on a voyage from New York to Liverpool. She was refloated and resumed her voyage.
Warsaw	United Kingdom	The steamship ran ashore on the Isle of May, Fife. She was on a voyage from Leith, Lothian to Hamburg. She was refloated and put back to Leith.

== 19 April ==
List of shipwrecks: 19 April 1870
Ship	State	Description
St. François	France	The ship was lost at "Cabera de Toro", Haiti.
Vine	United Kingdom	The ship ran aground near Dunfanaghy, County Donegal. She was on a voyage from Dunfanaghy to Glasgow, Renfrewshire.

== 20 April ==
List of shipwrecks: 20 April 1870
Ship	State	Description
Ariel	Norway	The ship was driven ashore near Wadsoe.
Apollo	United Kingdom	The schooner ran aground at Sunderland, County Durham. She was on a voyage from Sunderland to Aberdeen. She was refloated the next day and put back to Sunderland in a leaky condition.
Diana	Norway	The ship was driven ashore near Wadsoe.
Sado	United Kingdom	The steamship ran around and was wrecked off Rosevear, Isles of Scilly. All on board were rescued. She was on a voyage from Porto, Portugal to London.
Tanahorn	Norway	The ship was driven ashore near Wadsoe.

== 21 April ==
List of shipwrecks: 21 April 1870
Ship	State	Description
Alexander Turner	United Kingdom	The smack capsized and sank in the Firth of Clyde off Great Cumbrae with the loss of two of her three crew. The survivor was rescued by the tug Rapid (United Kingdom). Alexander Turner was on a voyage from Brodick, Isle of Arran to Bowling, Dunbartonshire.
Alice Jane	United Kingdom	The lighter foundered off Rosneath, Argyllshire. Both crew were rescued by the tug Flying Spray (United Kingdom).
Italia	Italy	The ship was driven ashore and wrecked north of Anjer, Netherlands East Indies with the loss of 51 lives. There were about 500 survivors. She was on a voyage from Macao, China to Havana, Cuba.
Racer	United Kingdom	The ship capsized at Tientsin, China.

== 22 April ==
List of shipwrecks: 22 April 1870
Ship	State	Description
Bob Chalmer	United Kingdom	The ship sank off Lundy Island, Devon according to a message in a bottle that washed up at Weston-super-Mare, Somerset on 25 April.
Freedom	United Kingdom	The smack foundered in the English Channel off Beachy Head, Sussex. She was on a voyage from Poole, Dorset to London.
Iduna	Netherlands	The ship departed from Singapore, Straits Settlements for Hong Kong. No further trace, presumed foundered with the loss of all hands.
Meteor	United Kingdom	The ship ran aground at Queenstown, County Cork. She was on a voyage from Pernambuco, Brazil to Queenstown. She was refloated.
Sprightly	United Kingdom	The ship was wrecked at Blackpool, Lancashire. Her crew were rescued by the Blackpool Lifeboat.

== 23 April ==
List of shipwrecks: 23 April 1870
Ship	State	Description
Amelia	United Kingdom	The smack was driven ashore on Inishane, County Donegal. She was on a voyage from Bunbeg to Burtonport.
Delphine, or J. Deephin	Hamburg	The barque was driven ashore at Ottendorf, Prussia. She was refloated.
Mary	United Kingdom	The smack was driven ashore at Barmouth, Merionethshire. She was on a voyage from Cardigan to Barmouth.
Stag	United Kingdom	The barge was driven ashore near Bridgwater, Somerset. She was on a voyage from Newport, Monmouthshire to Bridgewater. She was later refloated.

== 25 April ==
List of shipwrecks: 25 April 1870
Ship	State	Description
Hengist	Denmark	The steamship struck a sunken wreck off "Farnaes" and consequently put in to Fredrikshavn.
Unnamed	United Kingdom	The wherry sank in the River Tyne at Newcastle upon Tyne, Northumberland.
Sappho	United States	The yacht ran aground in Lymington Creek. She was refloated.

== 26 April ==
List of shipwrecks: 26 April 1870
Ship	State	Description
Volunteer	United Kingdom	The brig ran aground at Lymington, Hampshire. She was on a voyage from Cardiff, Glamorgan to Southampton, Hampshire. She was refloated.
Walter Hood	United Kingdom	The clipper was driven ashore and wrecked near Ulladulla, New South Wales with the loss of eleven of the 35 people on board. Survivors either reached the shore or were rescued by the steamship Illalong (New South Wales). Walter Hood was on a voyage from London to Sydney, New South Wales.

== 27 April ==
List of shipwrecks: 27 April 1870
Ship	State	Description
Charles	United Kingdom	The schooner was driven ashore at Lindisfarne, Northumberland. She was on a voyage from London to Dundee, Forfarshire. She was refloated and resumed her voyage.
Ocean Breeze	United Kingdom	The ship ran aground in the Kåfjord and was wrecked.
Wellington	United Kingdom	The tug was towed in to Bridlington, Yorkshire in a waterlogged condition. She was on a voyage from South Shields, County Durham to Constantinople, Ottoman Empire.

== 28 April ==
List of shipwrecks: 28 April 1870
Ship	State	Description
Baldur	Norway	The ship was wrecked at Borbjerg, Denmark with the loss of all but one of her fourteen crew. She was on a voyage from Newcastle upon Tyne, Northumberland, United Kingdom to Stockholm, Sweden.
Danmark	Denmark	The schooner was abandoned off Tynemouth, Northumberland in a sinking condition. Her crew survived.
Fox	United Kingdom	The steam launch was abandoned off Bridlington, Yorkshire. She was taken in to Bridlington the next day.
Good Intent	United Kingdom	The ship ran aground and sank west of Par, Cornwall. She was on a voyage from Newport, Monmouthshire to Par. She was refloated in early May.
Kinnaird	United Kingdom	The barque ran aground at Swansea, Glamorgan. She was on voyage from Swansea to Halifax, Nova Scotia, Canada. She was refloated the next day and taken in to the Mumbles in a leaky condition.
Soda	United Kingdom	The sloop was driven ashore at Lindisfarne, Northumberland. She was refloated.
Susan	United Kingdom	The sloop was wrecked at North Sunderland, County Durham. She was on a voyage form Aberdeen to Dunbeath, Caithness.
Virginia	United Kingdom	The ship departed from Mauritius for the Clyde. No further trace, presumed foundered with the loss of all hands.
William and Mary	United Kingdom	The ship sank off Terschelling, Friesland, Netherlands. She was on a voyage from Portmadoc, Caernarfonshire to Hamburg.

== 29 April ==
List of shipwrecks: 29 April 1870
Ship	State	Description
Sea King	United Kingdom	The tug caught fire and was severely damaged at Newport, Monmouthshire. She was scuttled.

== 30 April ==
List of shipwrecks: 30 April 1870
Ship	State	Description
Eagle	United Kingdom	The steamship ran aground at Sunderland, County Durham.
Sally Green	United Kingdom	The schooner was driven ashore and wrecked at Cemlyn, Anglesey. Her crew were rescued by the Cemlyn Lifeboat Sophia ( Royal National Lifeboat Institution).

== Unknown date ==
List of shipwrecks: Unknown date in April 1870
Ship	State	Description
Agnes M. Lovett	United Kingdom	The ship foundered west of Islay, Inner Hebrides on or before 12 April.
Albatross	Netherlands	The ship ran aground off Blankenese. She was on a voyage from Hamburg to Santos, Brazil. She was refloated and put back to Hamburg.
Aldebaran	Netherlands	The ship ran aground off Surabaya, Netherlands East Indies.
Anna	Prussia	The ship collided with the steamship Grand Duc Alexes (Belgium) and sank off Skagen, Denmark. Her crew were rescued. She was on a voyage from Burntisland, Fife, United Kingdom to Königsberg.
Argentine	Argentina	The ship was driven ashore. She was on a voyage from a port in Argentina to Asunción, Paraguay.
Atlantic	United Kingdom	The ship was driven ashore at Bahia Honda, Cuba. She was on a voyage from Jamaica to Falmouth, Cornwall.
Aunctica, and Laurens	Norway; Netherlands	The steamship Aunctica collided with Laurens and was beached near Hellevoetsluis, Zeeland. She was subsequently refloated. Laurens sank.
Aurora	Prussia	The ship was wrecked on Bornholm, Denmark. She was on a voyage from Papenburg to Königsberg.
Balder	Sweden	The barque was wrecked at Ipiranga, Brazil. She was on a voyage from Rio de Janeiro to Maceio.
Batallion	United Kingdom	The ship was driven ashore on Saltholm, Denmark. She was refloated.
Bella	(United Kingdom of Great Britain and Ireland) Jersey	The barque was wrecked on Ellen's Reef, in the Dampier Strait before 13 April.
Branstons	United Kingdom	The brig sank in the River Thames at Erith, Kent. She was refloated on 11 April.
Calypso	Norway	The barque ran aground north of Skagen.
Carl	Rostock	The ship collided with Eliza (United Kingdom) and sank off Cape Palos, Spain. Her crew were rescued.
Carl Dyberg	United Kingdom	The ship was wrecked at Bermuda. She was on a voyage from Havana, Cuba to Falmouth.
Catharina	United Kingdom	The ship was driven ashore on Heligoland. She was on a voyage from the Firth of Forth to Bremen. She was refloated and taken in to Bremen in a leaky condition.
Chevallier	United Kingdom	The ship foundered in the English Channel with the loss of all ten crew. She was on a voyage from Lagos to Liverpool, Lancashire.
Christiania	Hamburg	The barque ran aground on the Shipwash Sand, in the North Sea off the coast of Suffolk, United Kingdom. She was on a voyage from Hamburg to Valparaíso, Chile. She was refloated and taken in to Harwich, Essex, United Kingdom for repairs.
Cognate	United Kingdom	The ship ran aground at "Dolla Harbour". She was on a voyage from New Orleans, Louisiana, United States to Belfast, County Antrim.
Corea	France	The ship ran aground in the Banker's Strait before 5 April. She was on a voyage from Singapore, Straits Settlements to London, United Kingdom.
Crest of the Wave	United States	The medium clipper was wrecked on Hog Island, Pennsylvania, with the loss of all hands before 14 April. She was on a voyage from Liverpool to Baltimore, Maryland.
Dordrecht 2nd	Netherlands	The ship capsized at Amsterdam, North Holland.
Due Compari	Italy	The ship sprang a leak and sank at Venetico, Sicily.
East Atlantic	United States	The ship was driven ashore at Bahia Honda. She was on a voyage from Jamaica to Boston, Massachusetts.
Emma	United States	The ship was destroyed by fire in the Atlantic Ocean before 12 April. Her crew were rescued by Kate Prince (United States). Emma was on a voyage from New York to Galveston, Texas.
Eugenia	Mexico	The steamship was wrecked at Alvarado.
Forest King	United Kingdom	The ship was driven ashore on McNabs Island, Nova Scotia, Canada. She was on a voyage from London to Halifax, Nova Scotia.
Frederick Bliss	United States	The ship was driven ashore at Swampscott, Massachusetts. She was on a voyage from Cádiz, Spain to Boston, Massachusetts.
Gaston	France	The ship sank off Ilfracombe, Devon, United Kingdom. Her crew were rescued. She was on a voyage from Swansea, Glamorgan, United Kingdom to Nantes, Loire-Inférieure.
Gezina Smit	Danzig	The ship was driven ashore on Læsø, Denmark. She was on a voyage from Charleston, South Carolina, United States to Danzig.
Gondolier	United States	The ship was wrecked on the Piquet Rocks. She was on a voyage from Cárdenas, Cuba to New York.
Governor Higginson	United Kingdom	The steamship was driven ashore on Hirado Island, Japan and capsized.
Grace Clifton	United States	The ship was abandoned at sea. She was on a voyage from Darien to Providence, Rhode Island.
Harlequin	United Kingdom	The steamship ran aground at Ellekilde, Denmark. She was refloated.
Hedwig	United States	The ship was driven ashore and wrecked near the mouth of the "St. Francisco River". She was on a voyage from Valparaíso, Chile to New York.
Infanta	Spain	The ship foundered in the English Channel off the coast of Devon on or before 18 April.
Isabella Jackson	New Zealand	The 40-ton schooner left Wellington laden with coal for Lyttelton on 28 April and was not seen again.
Janet	United Kingdom	The ship was wrecked at Harbour Grace, Newfoundland Colony. She was on a voyage from Havana to Queenstown, County Cork.
John Lymeburner	United States	The ship was abandoned in the Atlantic Ocean. She was on a voyage from Cárdenas, Cuba to Baltimore.
John Romilly	United Kingdom	The ship collided with the steamship Dragon (United Kingdom) and was abandoned off Whitby, Yorkshire. Her crew were rescued. She was on a voyage from Granton, Lothian to London.
Josephine	United Kingdom	The ship was driven ashore. She was refloated and sailed for Gothenburg, Sweden in a leaky condition.
Josie Nickols	United States	The barque was driven ashore at Sanlúcar de Barrameda, Spain. She was consequently condemned.
Kremlin	Russia	The ship was wrecked on the Colorado Reef, off the coast of Cuba. She was on a voyage from Colón, United States of Colombia to Cienfuegos, Cuba.
Maceio	Brazil	The ship was wrecked at Ipiranga.
Malvina Jane	United States	The ship was wrecked in the Hatteras Inlet. She was on a voyage from Matanzas, Cuba to Baltimore.
Mary E. Walker	Canada	The ship was wrecked at Southwest Harbor, Maine, United States.
Milton	United Kingdom	The ship was abandoned at sea. She was on a voyage from Sagua la Grande, Cuba to Queenstown.
Mina	United Kingdom	The ship was driven ashore. She was refloated.
Navigator	Norway	The ship was driven ashore at Callantsoog, North Holland. She was on a voyage from Tønsberg to the Nieuw Diep.
Nellie Fenwick	United States	The ship was driven ashore at Sierra Morena, Cuba. She was on a voyage from Sierra Leone to Boston, Massachusetts.
Nicobar	India	The ship was driven ashore at Chittagong. She was on a voyage from Chittagong to Galle, Ceylon.
Noach III	Netherlands	The ship was driven ashore near Batavia, Netherlands East Indies. She was on a voyage from Batavia to Rotterdam, South Holland.
Norman	United Kingdom	The ship ran aground in the Dardanelles. She was on a voyage from Antwerp, Belgium to Constantinople, Ottoman Empire.
Ocean King	United Kingdom	The steamship ran aground at Kastrup, Denmark.
Olive de Bourke	Canada	The ship was abandoned in the Atlantic Ocean before 19 April.
Primus	United Kingdom	The steamship ran aground at Brunsbüttel, Prussia. She was refloated and taken in to Hamburg.
Rhode Steer	United Kingdom	The ship was lost near Villareal, Spain. She was on a voyage from Carloforte, Sardinia, Italy to Swansea.
Rhone	United Kingdom	The steamship ran aground off Çanakkale, Ottoman Empire. She was refloated and resumed her voyage.
Rosita	Spain	The brigantine was wrecked on the Isla de Lobos, Uruguay. Her crew were rescued. She was on a voyage from Barcelona to Montevideo, Uruguay.
Sarah	United Kingdom	The ship ran aground and capsized at Moulmein, Burma.
Schwalbe	Flag unknown	The ship was wrecked at Inagua, Bahamas. She was on a voyage from St. Marks, Florida, United States to Falmouth.
Spey	(United Kingdom of Great Britain and Ireland) Guernsey	The ship was driven ashore in Batten Bay.
St. Joseph	British Honduras	The ship was driven ashore and wrecked at Trujillo.
Thomas Freeman	United States	The ship was struck by lightning off Cape Hatteras, North Carolina, and was consequently destroyed by fire. She was on a voyage from New Orleans, Louisiana, to Kronstadt, Russia.
Vinskabet	Norway	The ship was driven ashore at Kirkcaldy, Fife, United Kingdom. She was on a voyage from Methil, Fife to Bergen.
William and John	United Kingdom	The ship collided with another vessel and was beached on Skagen She was on a voyage from South Shields, County Durham to Swinemünde, Prussia.
William Gillies	United Kingdom	The barque was wrecked at Punta de Maya, near Matanzas. She was on a voyage from Greenock, Renfrewshire to Matanzas.
William H. Prescott	United Kingdom	The ship was wrecked on "St. Anna Island". Her crew were rescued. She was on a voyage from the Chinchas Islands, Peru to Antwerp
Wriendschap	Netherlands	The ship was driven ashore and wrecked. She was on a voyage from Larvik, Norway to Termunterzijl, Groningen.
