= Borbjerg =

Village in western Jutland, Denmark

- Village
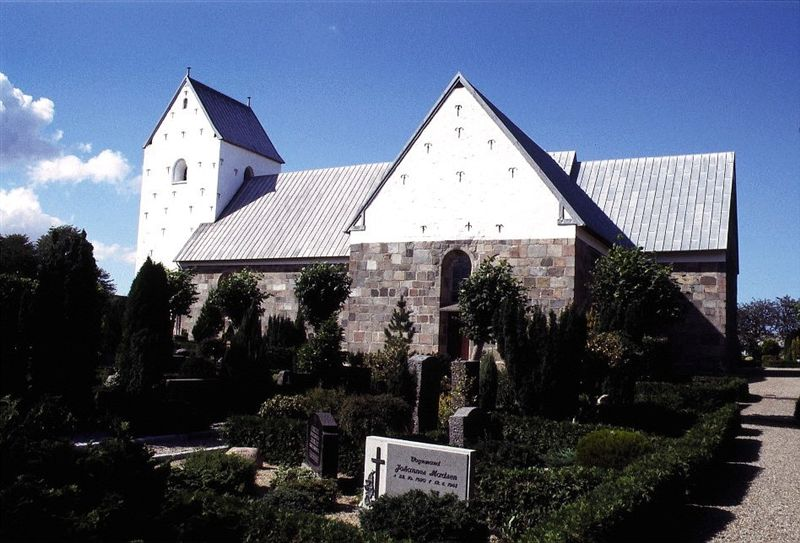
- Borbjerg Church

- Location in Central Denmark Region Borbjerg (Denmark)
- Coordinates: 56°24′17″N 8°45′15″E
- Country: Denmark
- Region: Central Denmark (Midtjylland)
- Municipality: Holstebro Municipality

Population (2026)
  - Total: 472

Borbjerg is a small village in the western Jutland, Denmark, with a population of 472 (1. January 2026). Borbjerg is located 9 km south of Vinderup and 13 km northeast of Holstebro.

Borbjerg is located in Holstebro Municipality, Central Denmark Region.

Borbjerg Church is located in the village. It is one of Denmark's largest village churches, build around 1150 of granite blocks.
