= Velocipede (disambiguation) =

A velocipede is a human-powered, wheeled land vehicle. The term may also refer to:

- Velocipede, original name of the Benz Velo, the first large-scale production car
- Velocipede (horse) (1825–1850), a British Thoroughbred racehorse and sire
- Velocipede betimari, a species of fossil centipede known from Crato Formation
- USS Velocipede (SP-1258), a United States Navy patrol vessel in commission from 1917 to 1919
- Velocipede, a ship - see List of shipwrecks in January 1825
- Velocipede, a brig - see List of shipwrecks in May 1851
- Velocipede, a ship that was shipwrecked in the North Sea - see List of shipwrecks in August 1874
- LNWR 187 Velocipede - see Locomotives of the London and North Western Railway

== See also ==
- Le Vélocipède Illustré, a French newspaper published twice a month from 1869 to 1872
