= M'Clure Bay =

Bay in Nunavut, Canada

- Location within Nunavut
- Location: Peel Sound
- Coordinates: 73°37′N 95°38′W
- Ocean/sea sources: Arctic Ocean
- Basin countries: Canada
- Settlements: Uninhabited

M'Clure Bay (variant: McClure Bay) is a Peel Sound^{map} waterway in the Qikiqtaaluk Region, Nunavut, Canada. It is located on the western side of Somerset Island,^{map} between Aston Bay^{map} and Birmingham Bay^{map}.

The bay is named in honour of Arctic explorer Sir Robert McClure (M'Clure).

== Mapping ==
- Peel Sound, 73°00′N 96°20′W
- Somerset Island, 73°15′N 93°30′W
- Aston Bay, 73°44′N 95°00′W
- Birmingham Bay, 73°23′N 95°38′W
