= Birmingham Bay =

Bay in Nunavut, Canada

- Location within Nunavut
- Location: Peel Sound
- Coordinates: 73°23′N 095°38′W
- Ocean/sea sources: Arctic Ocean
- Basin countries: Canada
- Settlements: Uninhabited

Birmingham Bay is an Arctic waterway in the Qikiqtaaluk Region, Nunavut, Canada. It is an arm of Peel Sound and is located on the western side of Somerset Island. It is located north of M'Clure Bay. The closest hamlet is Resolute, located about 148 km (92 mi) to the north on Cornwallis Island.
