= Pandora Island =

Uninhabited island in the Canadian Arctic

- Location within Nunavut Location within Canada

Geography
- Location: Northern Canada
- Coordinates: 72°47′N 96°47′W
- Archipelago: Arctic Archipelago

Administration
- Canada
- Territory: Nunavut
- Region: Qikiqtaaluk

Demographics
- Population: Uninhabited

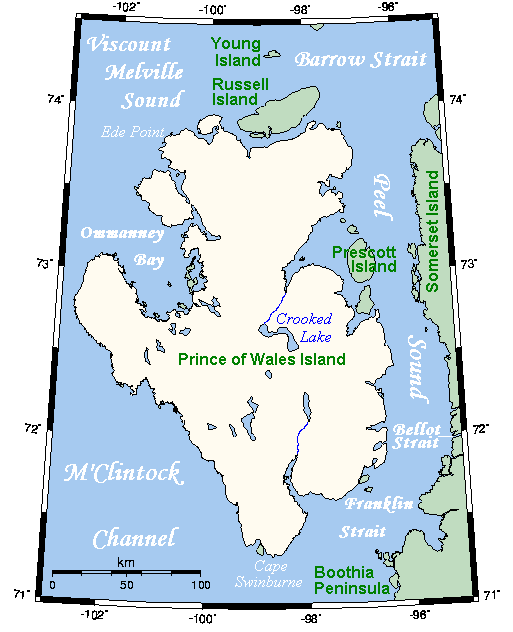
A map showing Prince of Wales Island, and the Peel Straight

Pandora Island is a member of the Arctic Archipelago in the territory of Nunavut. It lies in Peel Sound at the entrance of Prince of Wales Island's Young Bay, while Somerset Island's Four Rivers Bay is to the east. The larger Prescott Island is to the north.
