= Stanwell-Fletcher Lake =

Lake in Nunavut, Canada

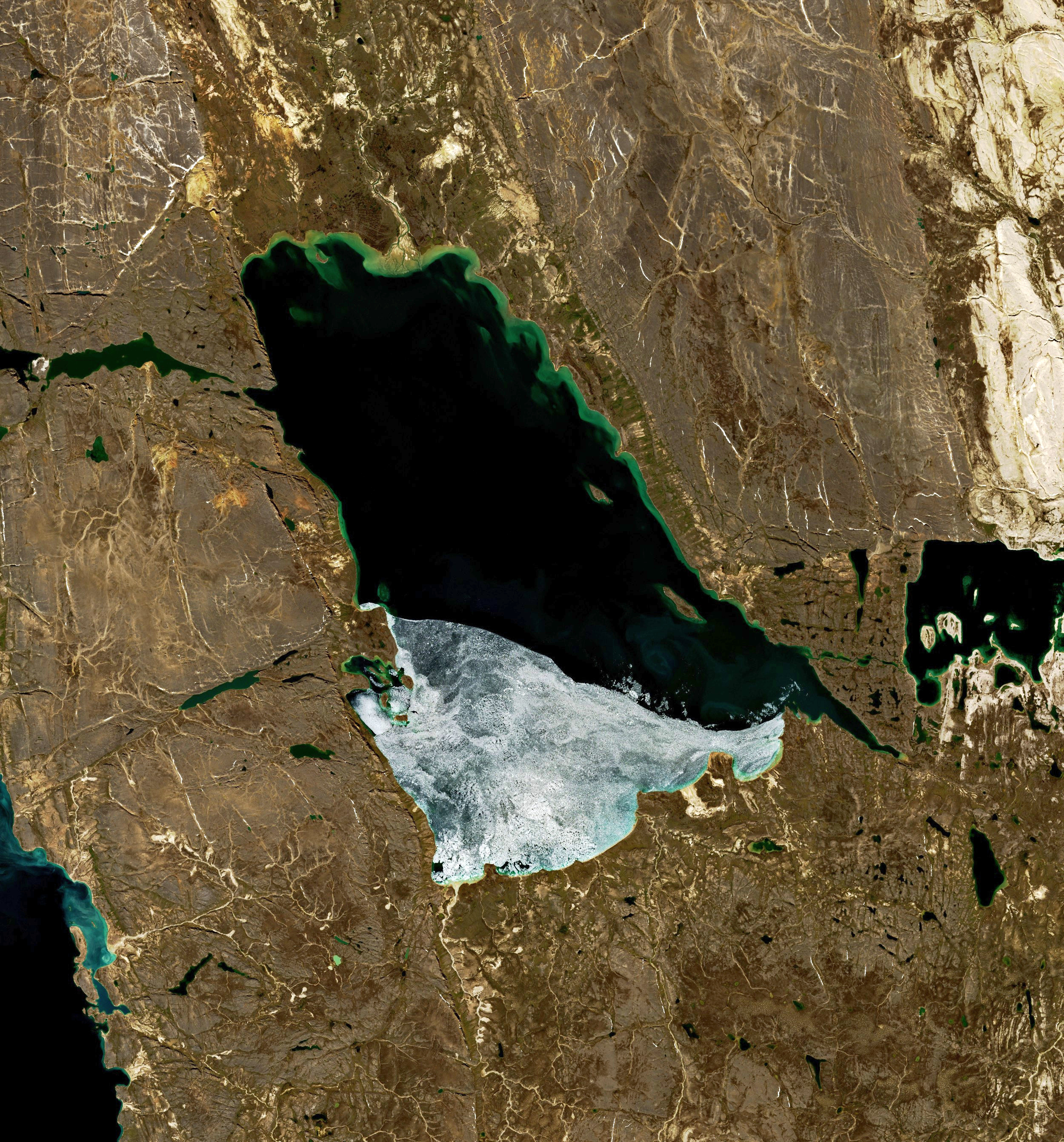
- Sentinel-2 image (2020)

- Stanwell-Fletcher Lake location in Nunavut Stanwell-Fletcher Lake (Canada)
- Location: Somerset Island, Nunavut, Canada
- Coordinates: 72°46′N 94°48′W
- Type: Monomictic glacial lake
- Etymology: Named after USAAF Major J.F. Stanwell-Fletcher
- Primary inflows: Stanwell-Fletcher River
- Primary outflows: Union River
- Catchment area: 1,970 square kilometres (760 sq mi)
- Basin countries: Canada
- Max. length: 25 km (16 mi)
- Max. width: 15 km (9.3 mi)
- Surface area: 339 km^{2} (131 sq mi)
- Max. depth: About 100 m (330 ft)
- Surface elevation: 7.6 m (25 ft)

Stanwell-Fletcher Lake is the largest lake on Somerset Island, the tenth-largest island of the Canadian Arctic Archipelago. The lake, along with most of Somerset Island, is located within the Qikiqtaaluk Region of the Canadian territory of Nunavut.

== Geography and hydrology ==
Stanwell-Fletcher Lake is located in a central area of Somerset Island that is west of Creswell Bay, which indents the eastern coastline of the island, and east of Four Rivers Bay, part of Peel Sound. A few small, unnamed islands exist on the lake. It is fed by several inflows, with the largest being the Stanwell-Fletcher River, which flows from Fiona Lake to the north end of Stanwell-Fletcher Lake. The only outflow of the lake is the Union River, which flows from the eastern end of the lake to Creswell Bay, through a low-lying, rocky area, for an approximate distance of 4 km (2.5 mi). The drainage basin of the lake covers an area of 1,970 km^{2} (760 sq mi), which is about 8% of the total area of Somerset Island. The lake itself has an area of 339 km^{2} (131 sq mi).

Due to its tundral climate, the lake and the surrounding rivers and creeks are frozen for most of the year, allowing little surface flow in or out of the lake except during the arctic summer. Subsurface drainage of the surrounding area into the lake is minimal, due to the non-permeable nature of the perpetually frozen soil and underlying rock layers. Although when first studied in the 1960s, the lake maintained ice cover over several years, with little thawing in the summer, its ice cover, as of a 2015 study, has recently become more seasonal in nature, with more regular and intense thawing, with the most significant thawing in July and August.

Stanwell-Fletcher Lake is monomictic and isothermal in nature, with the water in the lake mixing at only one point each year, and maintaining a relatively constant average temperature of 1.5 °C (34.7 °F). The lake consists completely of fresh water, although the lake basin was previously a tidal or seasonal extension of a salt water fjord until around 2400 Before Present (BP), when it became lacustrine, and the salt water was gradually replaced through circulation.

== Geology ==
Stanwell-Fletcher Lake is glacial in origin, with the basin it lies within being formed during the Pleistocene by glacial scouring of sediment in a Cretaceous graben. After the glacier, specifically part of the Innuitian ice sheet receded, the basin either became part of a fjord, connected to Creswell Bay or Four Rivers Bay, or if connected to both, became part of a channel that would have separated the northern and southern parts of Somerset Island. Post-glacial rebound gradually uplifted the area; by around 3500 BP the uplift in surrounding low-lying areas had isolated the lake, although seasonal or tidal saltwater inflow from the sea continued until around 2400 BP.

The rock surrounding the lake is largely Precambrian in origin, being part of the Boothia Arch, a northern extension of the Canadian Shield, while the rock to the northwest and underlying the lake is most likely Cretaceous and Tertiary. The topography rises steeply to the west, southwest, and northeast of the lake, to outcropped highlands, while the rocky uplifted lowland in the southeast leads to Creswell Bay, and the thermokarst terrain surrounding the Stanwell-Fletcher River in the northwest has a more gradual slope.

Sediments at the bottom of the lake mostly consist of mud from decomposed organic material, and pebbles, although there are finer-grain sediments in the northeast, deposited into the lake by the several rivers that drain the surrounding highlands. The main bathymetric feature of the lake is a u-shaped trough extending from the northwest to southeast of the lake, that reaches a maximum depth of around 100 m (330 ft). The lakebed slopes steeply down to this trough in the western part of the lake, while shallower shelves exist in the southwest and east.

== Ecology ==
The harsh tundral climate and minimal soil cover of the highlands surrounding the lake allows only a few types of plants to grow there, mostly lichens, mosses, and arctic willow. Vegetation is more prominent in the thermokarst lowlands to the north of the lake, which are dominated by sedges during the summer. The low-lying areas to the southeast of the lake, and the nearby Creswell Bay, host a Canadian Important Bird Area. The area supports large bird populations during the summer, especially breeding populations of various shorebirds. 13 shorebird species have been observed in the area, while 11 are known to breed there. These species includes the white-rumped sandpiper, red phalarope, black-bellied plover, sanderling, American golden plover, ruddy turnstone, Baird's sandpiper, buff-breasted sandpiper, pectoral sandpiper, semipalmated sandpiper, and red knot. Other birds with populations in the area include the snow goose, king eider, long-tailed duck, northern fulmar, black-legged kittiwake, and peregrine falcon. Stanwell-Fletcher Lake is also a large and important habitat for anadromous populations of arctic char, which spend summer in coastal areas including Creswell Bay and surrounding waters, but migrate via the Union River to in the lake before it freezes over. Fourhorn sculpin are also present within the lake.

== History ==
Somerset Island was inhabited by Inuit or pre-Inuit cultures for large parts of its history. Remnants of Pre-Dorset and/or Dorset settlements have been found on the northwest shore of the lake, along steeply walled valleys that lead to the west coast of the island and may have previously surrounded a fjord connected to the lake.

Although the coastline of Somerset Island had been mapped by several European expeditions in the 19th century, inland areas were not extensively explored during that time period. The island was more intensively mapped by aerial surveys carried out by the RCAF in 1950, which likely revealed the large inland lake. Stanwell-Fletcher Lake was named after USAAF Major J.F. Stanwell-Fletcher, who parachuted into Fort Ross in 1943. The jump was the first parachute jump north of the Arctic Circle, and was made to assist in evacuation efforts of the then-active trading post in the southeast of Somerset Island.
