= Aston Bay =

Bay in Nunavut, Canada

- Location in Nunavut
- Location: Peel Sound
- Coordinates: 73°44′N 095°00′W
- Ocean/sea sources: Arctic Bay
- Basin countries: Canada
- Settlements: Uninhabited

Aston Bay is an Arctic waterway in the Qikiqtaaluk Region of Nunavut, Canada. It is an arm of Peel Sound and is located on the western side of Somerset Island. It is located north of M'Clure Bay. The closest hamlet is Resolute, located about 150 km (93 mi) to the north on Cornwallis Island.

== Geography ==
A zone of zinc-silver mineralization is located on tidewater upon a peninsula that juts into the bay.

== History ==
There are Early Arctic small tool tradition and Thule archaeological sites in the area.
