= Barth Island =

Island in Nunavut, Canada

- Location within Nunavut Location within Canada

Geography
- Location: Northern Canada
- Coordinates: 72°33′N 95°35′W
- Archipelago: Arctic Archipelago

Administration
- Canada
- Nunavut: Nunavut
- Region: Qikiqtaaluk

Demographics
- Population: Uninhabited

Barth Island is an uninhabited island in the Qikiqtaaluk Region of Nunavut, Canada. It is located in Peel Sound, south of Somerset Island's Four Rivers Bay, and the equally small Otrick Island. Prince of Wales Island is to the west.
