= Otrick Island =

Island in Nunavut, Canada

- Location within Nunavut Location within Canada

Geography
- Location: Northern Canada
- Coordinates: 72°36′N 95°37′W
- Archipelago: Arctic Archipelago

Administration
- Canada
- Nunavut: Nunavut
- Region: Qikiqtaaluk

Demographics
- Population: Uninhabited

Otrick Island is a member of the Arctic Archipelago in the territory of Nunavut. The uninhabited island lies in Peel Sound, south of Somerset Island's Four Rivers Bay. The equally small Barth Island is to the south.
