= List of shipwrecks in August 1874 =

The following ships were sunk, foundered, grounded, or otherwise lost during August 1874.

== 1 August ==
List of shipwrecks: 1 August 1874
Ship	State	Description
Lady Ambrosine	United Kingdom	The steamship struck rocks and was beached in Loch Sunart. She was on a voyage from Glasgow, Renfrewshire to Loch Sunart.

== 2 August ==
List of shipwrecks: 2 August 1874
Ship	State	Description
Corinth	United Kingdom	The steamship was wrecked near Galley Head, County Cork. Her crew were rescued. She was on a voyage from New York, United States to Liverpool, Lancashire.
Courland	United Kingdom	The steamship was driven ashore at Saint Vincent. She was refloated and resumed her voyage in a leaky condition, but consequently put back to Saint Vincent.
Eclipse	United Kingdom	The schooner was driven ashore and wrecked in Mill Bay. Her crew were rescued.
Illyrian	United Kingdom	The steamship ran aground at Venice, Italy.
Wave	United Kingdom	The steamship was abandoned in the Atlantic Ocean 40 nautical miles (74 km) west of Cape Finisterre, Spain. Her crew were rescued. She subsequently drove ashore at Muros, Spain.

== 3 August ==
List of shipwrecks: 3 August 1874
Ship	State	Description
Fairy	New Zealand	The 34-ton schooner grounded in the Hokianga Harbour, New Zealand, during a strong gale.
Meikong	France	The steamship was driven ashore at Wusong, China.

== 5 August ==
List of shipwrecks: 5 August 1874
Ship	State	Description
Euxine	United Kingdom	The full-rigged ship caught fire in the southern Atlantic Ocean on a voyage from North Shields, Northumberland to Aden with coal. She was abandoned on 8 August at 31°20′S 7°45′W). Twenty-three of her crew reached Saint Helena on 18 August in two boats. Eight crew in a third boat did not find St Helena and headed for Brazil; on 31 August the Dutch ship Java Packet picked up five survivors (two had drowned in a capsize and a third had sacrificed himself to feed the others) and landed them at Batavia, Dutch East Indies on 2 November.
Martha and Lizzie	United Kingdom	The fishing trawler was run down and sunk in the Irish Sea off the Morecambe Bay Lightship ( Trinity House) by the full-rigged ship Ironsides (United Kingdom) with the loss of two of her five crew.
Queen of the Lake	United Kingdom	The schooner was wrecked on Rømø, Denmark. Her crew were rescued. She was on a voyage from a Scottish port to the Weser.
Eudora, and Wildfire	United Kingdom (United Kingdom of Great Britain and Ireland) Royal Yacht Squadron	The schooner Wildfire collided with the fishing dandy Eudora and sank off Cowes, Isle of Wight. Her crew were rescued by the yacht Oimara ( (United Kingdom of Great Britain and Ireland) Royal Yacht Squadron). Eudora was beached.

== 6 August ==
List of shipwrecks: 6 August 1874
Ship	State	Description
Carrie Frances	United States	The schooner was lost on Malpec Bar. Crew saved.
City of St. Asaph	United Kingdom	The schooner ran aground at Holyhead, Anglesey. She was on a voyage from Portmadoc, Caernarfonshire to Stettin, Germany. She was refloated and towed in to Holyhead in a leaky condition.

== 7 August ==
List of shipwrecks: 7 August 1874
Ship	State	Description
Arctic	United Kingdom	The whaler was crushed by ice, caught fire and sank in Creswell Bay. Her 54 crew survived.
Doranella	Germany	The schooner was wrecked on the Barranellas. She was on a voyage from "Macabe" to Antwerp, Belgium.

== 8 August ==
List of shipwrecks: 8 August 1874
Ship	State	Description
Ernest	United Kingdom	The sailing barge sank at Shotley, Suffolk. Both crew survived.
Unnamed	United Kingdom	The dredger was abandoned in the Irish Sea. Her crew were rescued by a tug. She was being towed from Newcastle upon Tyne, Northumberland to Liverpool, Lancashire. She subsequently drove ashore at Black Combe, Cumberland.

== 9 August ==
List of shipwrecks: 9 August 1874
Ship	State	Description
Timsah	United Kingdom	The steamship was damaged by fire at sea. She was on a voyage from London to Kurrachee, India.

== 10 August ==
List of shipwrecks: 10 August 1874
Ship	State	Description
Caterina	Greece	The ship caught fire and was beached on "Jura". Her crew survived.
Fairfield	South Australia	The ship was wrecked at Cape Cassini, Kangaroo Island. Her crew were rescued. She was on a voyage from Adelaide to Newcastle, New South Wales.
Friends	United Kingdom	The ship ran aground at Clyth, Caithness. She was refloated the next day.
Rosa	United Kingdom	The ship ran aground in the River Avon under the Clifton Suspension Bridge. She was refloated.
Shepherd	United Kingdom	The barque was struck rocks in Table Bay and was wrecked. Her crew survived. She was on a voyage from London to Cape Town, Cape Colony.
Ville de Nantes	United Kingdom	The ship collided with the steamship P. Caland (Netherlands) and sank in the Atlantic Ocean.

== 11 August ==
List of shipwrecks: 11 August 1874
Ship	State	Description
British Ambassador	United Kingdom	The ship caught fire at Liverpool, Lancashire, or Blackwall, Middlesex and sank. She was refloated on 14 August.
Jessie May	United Kingdom	The schooner sprang a leak and sank 10 nautical miles (19 km) off The Maidens, County Antrim. She was on a voyage from Liverpool to Portsoy, Aberdeenshire.
Jane Young	United Kingdom	The barque ran aground in the River Mersey and sprang a leak. All on board were rescued by the Southport Lifeboat Eliza Fearnley ( Royal National Lifeboat Institution). Jane Young was on a voyage from Liverpool to Ardrossan, Ayrshire.
Minerva	United Kingdom	The schooner ran aground at Glückstadt, Germany. She was on a voyage from Hamburg, Germany to Porto, Portugal. She was refloated and found to be leaky.
Velocipede	United Kingdom	The ship ran aground on the Schwartzonne Sand, in the North Sea. She was on a voyage from a Scottish port to Hamburg, Germany.
Unnamed	Flag unknown	The brig ran aground on the Yeds Sandbank, in the Irish Sea off Southport, Lancashire.

== 12 August ==
List of shipwrecks: 12 August 1874
Ship	State	Description
James Seed	United Kingdom	The schooner collided with the steamship Norma (United Kingdom) and sank with the loss of five of her nine crew. Survivors were rescued by Norma. James Seed was on a voyage from Quebec City, Canada to Swansea, Glamorgan.

== 13 August ==
List of shipwrecks: 13 August 1874
Ship	State	Description
Marion	Germany	The steamship was driven ashore and wrecked on Goos Island, in the Elbe.

== 14 August ==
List of shipwrecks: 14 August 1874
Ship	State	Description
Gertrude	United Kingdom	The schooner was driven ashore at Groomsport, County Down.
Guiding Star	United Kingdom	The fishing boat was wrecked at Macduff, Aberdeenshire. Her crew were rescued by the Banff Lifeboat.
Nancy	United Kingdom	The smack was wrecked at Porlock, Somerset.
No. 1 London	United Kingdom	The barge collided with Barnes Railway Bridge and sank in the River Thames with the loss of one life.
Ocean	United Kingdom	The fishing boat was wrecked at Macduff. Her crew were rescued by the Banff Lifeboat.
State of Pennsylvania	United Kingdom	The steamship ran aground in the Clyde. She was on a voyage from Glasgow, Renfrewshire to New York, United States.
Vanguard	United Kingdom	The schooner was driven ashore at "Koulought", County Kerry.

== 15 August ==
List of shipwrecks: 15 August 1874
Ship	State	Description
Parrasford	United Kingdom	The steamship ran aground in the River Avon under the Clifton Suspension Bridge. She was on a voyage from Brăila, Ottoman Empire to Bristol, Gloucestershire.

== 17 August ==
List of shipwrecks: 17 August 1874
Ship	State	Description
Annsboro'	United Kingdom	The steamship sprang a leak and foundered off Strumble Head, Pembrokeshire. Her eight crew were rescued. She was on a voyage from Swansea, Glamorgan to Garston, Lancashire.
Essex	United Kingdom	The ship was sighted off Bic, Quebec, Canada whilst on a voyage from Quebec City to Aberdeen. No further trace, presumed foundered with the loss of all seventeen crew.
Mary and Catherine	United Kingdom	The ship was driven ashore and wrecked at Saddell, Argyllshire. She was on a voyage from Glasgow, Renfrewshire to Saddell.
Matheu Fournay	France	The ship was driven ashore at Boulogne, Pas-de-Calais. She was on a voyage from Boulogne to Swansea. She was refloated on 1 September and put back to Boulogne.
Rescue	United Kingdom	The tug suffered a boiler explosion and sank at Newport, Monmouthshire with the loss of two of her five crew. The wreck had been removed by early November.

== 18 August ==
List of shipwrecks: 18 August 1874
Ship	State	Description
Malta	United Kingdom	The East Indiaman ran aground at Dundee, Forfarshire. She was on a voyage from Calcutta, India to Dundee.
May	(United Kingdom of Great Britain and Ireland) Cape Colony	The ship departed from Algoa Bay for Cape Town. No further trace, presumed foundered with the loss of all hands.

== 19 August ==
List of shipwrecks: 19 August 1874
Ship	State	Description
Azuma	Imperial Japanese Navy	The ironclad was driven ashore in a typhoon at Kagoshima. Subsequently refloated, repaired and returned to service.
Daisy	United Kingdom	The steamship was driven ashore in Sonandereh Bay. She was on a voyage from Newport, Monmouthshire to Galaţi, Ottoman Empire. She was refloated on 21 August and taken in to constantinople, Ottoman Empire.
Pascal	United Kingdom	The steamship was wrecked at Cap La Hougue, Seine-Inférieure, France. All on board survived. She was on a voyage from Havre de Grâce, Seine-Inférieure to Buenos Aires, Argentina.
Southern Cross	United Kingdom	The smack was abandoned off Skokholm, Pembrokeshire. Her crew were rescued by the steamship Clutha (United Kingdom), which towed Southern Cross in to Milford Haven, Pembrokeshire.

== 20 August ==
List of shipwrecks: 20 August 1874
Ship	State	Description
Bertha	United Kingdom	The steamship was driven ashore in a typhoon at Nagasaki, Japan.
Daring	United Kingdom	The ship ran aground at Shoreham-by-Sea, Sussex. She was on a voyage from Hartlepool, County Durham to Shoreham-by-Sea. She was refloated and found to be severely leaky.
Grecian	United Kingdom	The ship ran aground 2 nautical miles (3.7 km) off Stockholm, Sweden. She was on a voyage from Stockholm to Pärnu, Russia. She was refloated and put back to Stockholm in a leaky condition.
Hamburg	Germany	The barque was driven ashore in a typhoon at Nagasaki.
Madras	United Kingdom	The steamship was driven ashore in a typhoon at Nagasaki.
Ping On	China	The steamship was driven ashore in a typhoon at Nagasaki. She was refloated in October.
Yen-tai	China	The steamship was driven ashore in a typhoon at Nagasaki.
Unnamed	Flag unknown	The steamship was driven ashore in a typhoon at Nagasaki.
310 unnamed vessels	Japan	The ships were driven ashore or sunk in a typhoon at Nagasaki .

== 21 August ==
List of shipwrecks: 21 August 1874
Ship	State	Description
Alice	United Kingdom	The steamship ran aground in the River Carron. She was on a voyage from Newcastle upon Tyne, Northumberland to Grangemouth, Stirlingshire.
Bertha	Flag unknown	The ship was driven ashore in a typhoon at Nagasaki, Japan. She was refloated.
Bob Chambers	United Kingdom	The tug was destroyed by fire and sank in the River Usk. The wreck had been removed by early November.
Elizabeth Ann	United Kingdom	The ship ran aground in the River Mersey at Eastham, Cheshire. She was on a voyage from Garston, Lancashire to Salcombe, Devon.
Glasgow	United Kingdom	The steamship ran aground in the River Carron. She was on a voyage from Grangemouth to Rotterdam, South Holland, Netherlands.
Hamburg	Germany	The ship was driven ashore in a typhoon at Nagasaki.
Hemaja	United Kingdom	The tug sank off Peterhead, Aberdeenshire. Her crew survived.
Sooloo	United Kingdom	The ship was driven ashore in a typhoon at Nagasaki. She was refloated.

== 22 August ==
List of shipwrecks: 22 August 1874
Ship	State	Description
Fleetwing	United States	The schooner collided with the full-rigged ship Marseilles (United Kingdom) and sank in the Atlantic Ocean with the loss of nine of her twelve crew.
Nuova Fama	Portugal	The ship ran aground on the Inner Barrels, off Courtmacsherry, County Cork, United Kingdom. She was on a voyage from New York, United States to Queenstown, County Cork. She was refloated and towed in to Queenstown in a leaky condition.
Vesta	United Kingdom	The steamship collided with another vessel in the River Thames and was beached at Tilbury Fort, Essex. She was on a voyage from Rotterdam, South Holland, Netherlands to London. She was refloated the next day and taken in to London.

== 23 August ==
List of shipwrecks: 23 August 1874
Ship	State	Description
City of Adelaide	United Kingdom	City of Adelaide stranded on Kirkcaldy Beach The clipper was stranded on Kirkcaldy Beach, South Australia. Refloated 4 September and returned to service.
Fairholm	United Kingdom	The steamship was wrecked on Tory Island, County Donegal with the loss of five of her eleven crew.

== 25 August ==
List of shipwrecks: 25 August 1874
Ship	State	Description
Noumea	France	The barque caught fire at Madras, India.
Mary Grace	United Kingdom	The schooner collided with the steamship Glengarnock (United Kingdom) and foundered off the coast of Ayrshire with the loss of one of her four crew. Survivors were rescued by the schooner Ellen (United Kingdom). Mary Grace was on a voyage from Bangor, Caernarfonshire to Glasgow, Renfrewshire.

== 26 August ==
List of shipwrecks: 26 August 1874
Ship	State	Description
Ivanhoe	New Zealand	The 72-ton schooner sailed from Auckland for Suva, Fiji. No further trace, presumed foundered with the loss of all hands.
Lucayas	United Kingdom	The ship caught fire at Calcutta, India. She was on a voyage from Dundee, Forfarshire to Calcutta.

== 27 August ==
List of shipwrecks: 27 August 1874
Ship	State	Description
Echo	United Kingdom	The steamship ran aground at Sunderland, County Durham and was severely damaged. She was on a voyage from Rotterdam, South Holland, Netherlands to Sunderland.
Fidente	Austria-Hungary	The barque ran aground at Maryport, Cumberland, United Kingdom. She was on a voyage from New York, United States to Maryport.

== 28 August ==
List of shipwrecks: 28 August 1874
Ship	State	Description
Balder	Norway	The ship departed from Arkhangelsk, Russia for Granton, Lothian, United Kingdom. No further trace, presumed foundered with the loss of all hands.
Rosebud	United Kingdom	The ship ran aground at Altona, Germany and was beached in a waterlogged condition. Temporary repairs were made, and she was taken in to Altona in late September.

== 29 August ==
List of shipwrecks: 29 August 1874
Ship	State	Description
Albion	United Kingdom	The ship was destroyed by fire at Probolingo, Netherlands East Indies.
Emily, and Londos	United Kingdom	The steamship Emily was in collision with the steamship Londos off the Whitton Lightship ( Trinity House), in the Humber and was cut in two. Both parts sank. Her twelve crew survived. Emily was on a voyage from Goole, Yorkshire to London. The stern section was raised on 18 September. The bow section was cleared on the orders of Trinity House in April 1875. Londos was on a voyage from Goole to a Dutch port. Severely damaged, she was beached at Hessle, Yorkshire. Her twelve crew survived.
Helen Campbell	Canada	The ship departed from Charleston, South Carolina, United States for London. No further trace, presumed foundered with the loss of all hands.
Maria	France	The ship departed from Nantes, Loire-Inférieure for Cardiff, Glamorgan, United Kingdom. No further trace, presumed foundered with the loss of all hands.
Père de Famille	France	The schooner was driven ashore on Skagen, Denmark. She was on a voyage from Vyborg, Grand Duchy of Finland to Bayonne, Basses-Pyrénées.
Reaper	(United Kingdom of Great Britain and Ireland) Guernsey	The ship ran aground on the Maplin Sand, in the North Sea off the coast of Essex and was severely damaged. She was refloated.

== 30 August ==
List of shipwrecks: 30 August 1874
Ship	State	Description
Ione	United Kingdom	The cutter yacht ran aground and capsized at West Cowes, Isle of Wight.
Mary Grant	India	The tugboat foundered at the Sand Heads, Calcutta with the loss of eight lives.

== 31 August ==
List of shipwrecks: 31 August 1874
Ship	State	Description
Caroline	United Kingdom	The brig ran aground at Barnstaple, Devon. Her five crew were rescued by the Braunton Lifeboat.
Corumba	Brazil	The steamship was wrecked in the River Plate at "Molmodo".
New Granada	United Kingdom	The ship struck a submerged object at Hong Kong. She was on a voyage from Niuzhuang, China to Hong Kong. She was refloated and taken in to Hong Kong in a leaky condition.

== Unknown date ==
List of shipwrecks: Unknown date in August 1874
Ship	State	Description
Alceste	United Kingdom	The barque was driven ashore and wrecked in Portaline Bay, County Donegal. Her fifteen crew were rescued.
Allegro	United Kingdom	The ship ran aground of the Dutch coast. She was refloated and taken in to Hamburg, Germany.
Androcles	(Romania) United Principalities	The brig caught fire off "Nagara". She was towed in to the Dardanelles, where she sank. She was on a voyage from Swansea, Glamorgan, United Kingdom to Constantinople, Ottoman Empire.
Androcles	(Romania) United Principalities	The brig caught fire in the Bosphorus. She was on a voyage from Constantinople to Odesa Russia.
Azalea	Dominion of Canada	The steamship was wrecked at Mistaken Point, Newfoundland Colony. She was on a voyage from New York, United States to Saint John, New Brunswick.
Baltic	United Kingdom	The schooner was abandoned off the coast of Anglesey. Her crew were rescued by the Bull Bay Lifeboat. She subsequently drove ashore and was wrecked.
Blair Athol	United Kingdom	The ship was wrecked on the English Bank, in the River Plate. She was on a voyage from Bordeaux, Gironde, France to Montevideo, Uruguay.
Bolivar	Austria-Hungary	The schooner ran aground near Tangiers, Morocco. She was on a voyage from New Yorkto Alexandria, Egypt. She was refloated and taken in to Gibraltar, where she arrived on 12 August in a leaky condition.
Conqueror	United Kingdom	The schooner ran aground on The Shingles, off the Isle of Wight.
Davig G. Fleming	United Kingdom	The ship sprang a severe leak and ran aground on the Indian coast. She was refloated and taken in to Madras.
Dunstanburgh	United Kingdom	The steamship ran aground at Dagerort, Russia. She was on a voyage from South Shields, County Durham to Kronstadt, Russia. She was refloated and resumed her voyage.
Ebenezer	Germany	The ship was driven ashore near Narva, Russia. Her crew were rescued.
Ecta	United Kingdom	The ship caught fire at Berbice, British Guiana.
Emilie	Germany	The brig foundered at sea before 10 August. Her crew were rescued by the schooner Queen (United Kingdom). Emilie was on a voyage from Sunderland, County Durham to Stettin.
Essie	United Kingdom	The ship was driven ashore at Peterhead, Aberdeenshire.
Excelsior	(United Kingdom of Great Britain and Ireland) Trinidad	The schooner was wrecked. Twenty-seven people were rescued on 21 August by Kilkerran (United Kingdom).
Fredeert Wanges	Norway	The tender was wrecked in the Atlantic Ocean with some loss of life. Ten survivors were rescued by the schooner Ann (United Kingdom).
George and Richard	United Kingdom	The ship ran aground near "Gallippia". She was on a voyage from Port Said, Egypt to London.
Germain	France	The steamship ran aground and was wrecked at "Fourches", Finistère before 11 August.
Golden Age	United Kingdom	The ship was driven ashore west of Cape Guardafui, Majeerteen Sultanate. She was on a voyage from Birkenhead, Cheshire to Aden. She was refloated and taken in to Aden in a leaky condition and was placed under repair.
Guillermo	United Kingdom	The steamship ran aground on the Bulkhead Bar, orr New Castle, Pennsylvania, United States. She was on a voyage from Philadelphia, Pennsylvania to Liverpool, Lancashire. She was refloated.
John Tucker	United Kingdom	The ship was wrecked on a reef in the Strait of Malacca before 7 August. Her crew were rescued. She was on a voyage from Yloilo, Spanish East Indies to Queenstown, County Cork.
Lanercost	United Kingdom	The barque was driven ashore on "Paday" before 8 August. She was on a voyage from Singapore, Straits Settlements to Yloilo.
Laure Julie	France	The lugger sank at Le Verdon-sur-Mer, Gironde. She was on a voyage from Bordeaux, Gironde to La Rochelle, Charente-Inférieure.
Laviniane	Flag unknown	The ship was wrecked. She was on a voyage from New York to Saint John's, Newfoundland Colony.
Liffey	United Kingdom	The steamship was wrecked at Montevideo, Uruguay. Her crew survived.
Lwlig	United Kingdom	The brig was driven ashore at Dragør, Denmark. She was on a voyage from Nyland, Sweden to Fécamp, Seine-Inférieure, France. She was refloated and taken in to Copenhagen, Denmark.
Militades	United Kingdom	The ship was driven ashore at Auckland, New Zealand before 5 August. She was refloated.
Minerva	United Kingdom	The schooner ran aground. She was on a voyage from Hamburg to Porto, Portugal. She was refloated and taken in to Glückstadt in a leaky condition.
Mogul	United States	The ship was destroyed by fire in the Pacific Ocean. Her crew survived. She was on a voyage from Liverpool to San Francisco, California.
Nashwauk	United Kingdom	The barque was wrecked on Cape Sable Island, Nova Scotia, Canada.
Nereide	Germany	The barque was taken in to Harwich, Essex, United Kingdom in a derelict condition.
North American	United Kingdom	The ship struck a sunken rock in the Gaspar Strait. She was on a voyage from Hong Kong to Liverpool. She put in to Singapore for repairs.
Osterbotten	Sweden	The steamship was destroyed by fire at Gothenburg with loss of life.
Petrellen	Norway	The barque ran aground at Riga, Russia. She was on a voyage from Riga to Antwerp, Belgium. She was refloated and resumed her voyage, but consequently put in to Copenhagen in a leaky condition.
Petronella	United Kingdom	The ship was driven ashore on Norderney, Germany. Her crew were rescued. She was on a voyage from Rügenwalde, Germany to Hartlepool, County Durham.
Sarmiento	United States	The barque was driven ashore on the Isla de Flores, Uruguay. She was on a voyage from Portland, Maine to Montevideo.
Solidor	Brazil	The steamship struck the quayside at Liverpool and drove her anchor through her bow. She was on a voyage from Pernambuco to Liverpool. She was docked in a sinking condition.
St. Olaf	Norway	The steamship ran aground on the Jubbal Teer She was refloated and taken in to Aden.
Therese	United Kingdom	The full-rigged ship ran aground on the Apo Reef. She was on a voyage from Hong Kong to Yloilo. She was refloated and put back to Hong Kong.
Trumph	United States	The brig was driven ashore near "Getares", Spain. She was on a voyage from Cette, Héraultl, France to New York.
Ulrica	United Kingdom	The ship was driven ashore on Sanday, Inner Hebrides. She was on a voyage from London to Saguenay, Quebec, Canada. She was refloated.
Una	United Kingdom	The ship was destroyed by fire in the Atlantic Ocean. She was on a voyage from Boston, Massachusetts, United States to London.
Unnamed	United Kingdom	The ship collided with the steamship Olbers (Belgium) and sank off the coast of Brazil.
