= De la Roquette Islands =

Island group in Nunavut, Canada

- Location within Nunavut Location within Canada

Geography
- Location: Northern Canada
- Coordinates: 72°10′N 095°30′W
- Archipelago: Canadian Arctic Archipelago

Administration
- Canada
- Territory: Nunavut
- Region: Qikiqtaaluk

Demographics
- Population: Uninhabited

The De la Roquette Islands are members of the Canadian Arctic Archipelago in the territory of Nunavut. They lie in Peel Sound, northwest of Somerset Island's Fitz Roy Inlet. Strzelecki Harbour on Prince of Wales Island is to the west.
