= Vivian Island =

Island in Nunavut, Canada

- Location within Nunavut Location within Canada

Geography
- Location: Northern Canada
- Coordinates: 73°10′N 96°55′W
- Archipelago: Arctic Archipelago

Administration
- Canada
- Territory: Nunavut
- Region: Qikiqtaaluk

Demographics
- Population: Uninhabited

Vivian Island is a member of the Arctic Archipelago in the territory of Nunavut. The uninhabited island lies in Peel Sound. Prince of Wales Island's Browne Bay is to the west, while Somerset Island is to the east. The smaller Lock Island is to the northwest, and the larger Prescott Island is to the south.
