= Prescott Island =

Uninhabited island in northern Canada

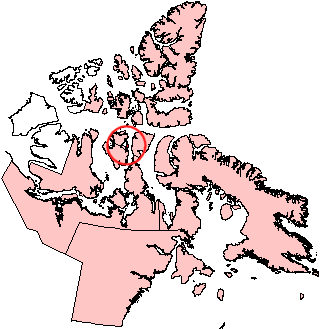
- Prescott Island, Nunavut.

- Location within Nunavut Location within Canada

Geography
- Location: Northern Canada
- Coordinates: 73°03′N 096°50′W
- Archipelago: Arctic Archipelago
- Area: 412 km^{2} (159 sq mi)

Administration
- Canada
- Territory: Nunavut
- Region: Qikiqtaaluk

Demographics
- Population: Uninhabited

Prescott Island is one of the uninhabited Canadian Arctic islands in the territory of Nunavut. The island is situated in Peel Sound, between the Prince of Wales Island and Somerset Island.

Prescott Island is oval-shaped, and has an area of 412 km^{2} (159 sq mi). Together with four other, smaller islands (Binstead, Lock, Pandora, and Vivian), they create a barrier at the entrance into Browne Bay on eastern Prince of Wales Island.
