= Creswell Bay =

Bay in Qikiqtaaluk Region, Nunavut, Canada

- Location within Nunavut
- Location: Western Prince Regent Inlet
- Coordinates: 72°41′N 93°25′W
- River sources: Creswell River; Union River
- Ocean/sea sources: Arctic Ocean
- Basin countries: Canada
- Surface area: 2,178 km^{2} (841 sq mi)
- Settlements: Uninhabited

Creswell Bay is an Arctic waterway in Qikiqtaaluk Region, Nunavut, Canada. It is an arm of western Prince Regent Inlet in eastern Somerset Island. Its northeastern landmark, Fury Point, is approximately 100 km (62 mi) west of Baffin Island.

While the bay does not have any permanent settlements, the closest is Resolute about 228 km (142 mi) to the north-northeast, it was an outpost camp and remains an important site to Inuit.

== Geography ==
Creswell Bay is large and almost semicircular. Its habitat is characterized by tundra, rivers, streams, mud, saline sand flats, a freshwater lake, open sea, inlets, coastal marine features, coastal cliffs, and rocky marine shores.

Stanwell-Fletcher Lake is joined to the bay by the Union River; crystalline rocks are notable along the way. The Creswell River also empties into the bay.

The Devonian period Peel Sound Formation outcrops at the bay. The formation consists of sandstone, grit, and conglomerate which is predominantly limestone.

== Fauna ==
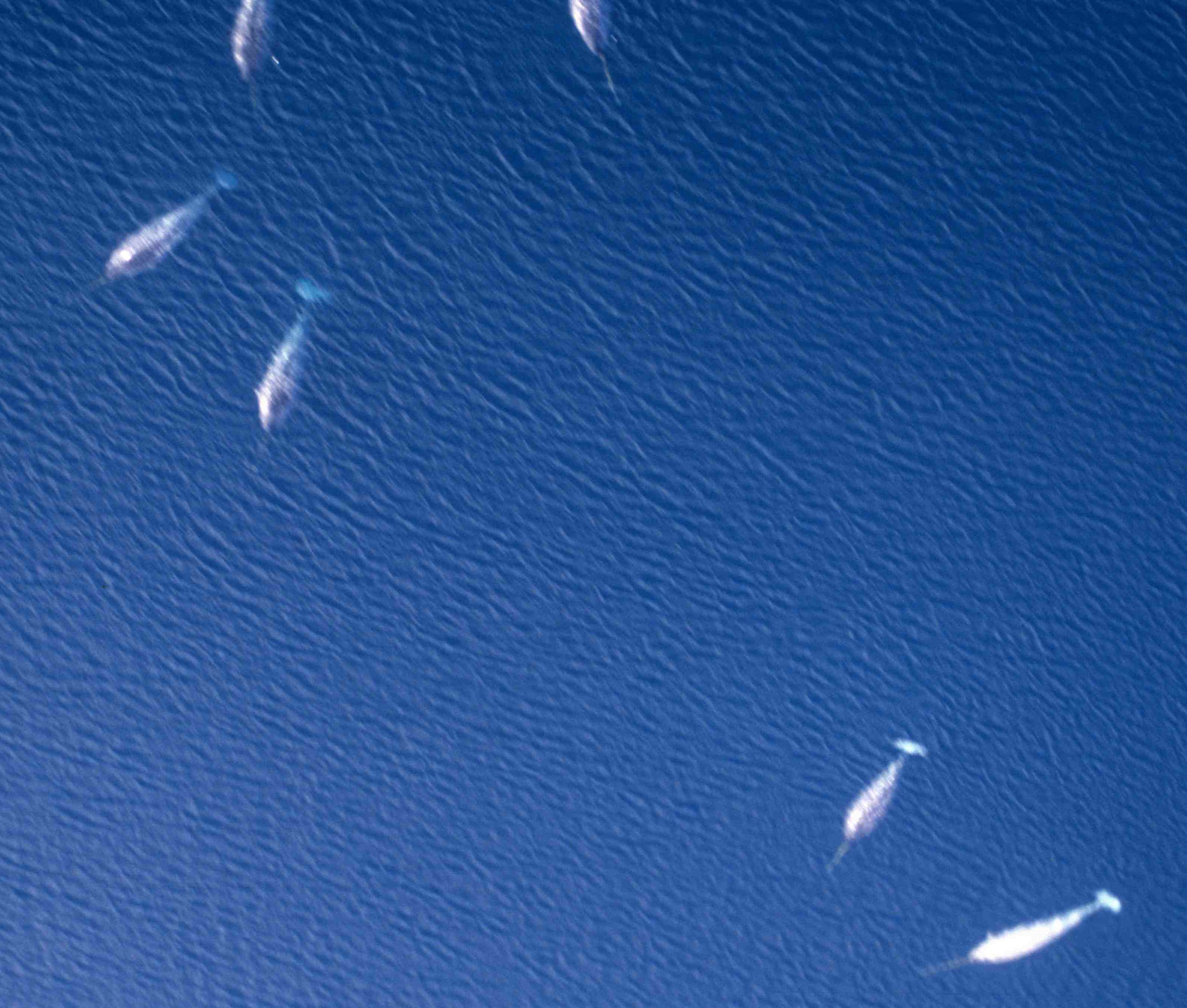
Narwhals in the bay

The bay is a Canadian Important Bird Area (#NU062). Notable bird species include grey plover, greater snow goose, king eider, long-tailed duck, red phalarope, sanderling, and white-rumped sandpiper. Arctic char enter the bay in the late summer and swim up the Union River to Stanwell-Fletcher Lake, where they over-winter. The large numbers of char attract beluga whales and narwhals which feed on them.

== History ==
Archaeological sites include Thule encampments and Dorset settlements.
