= Lock Island (Nunavut) =

Island in Nunavut, Canada

- Location within Nunavut Location within Canada

Geography
- Location: Peel Sound
- Coordinates: 73°16′N 96°08′W
- Archipelago: Arctic Archipelago

Administration
- Canada
- Nunavut: Nunavut
- Region: Qikiqtaaluk

Demographics
- Population: Uninhabited

Lock Island is a member of the Arctic Archipelago in the territory of Nunavut. It lies in Peel Sound across the mouth of Browne Bay, between northeastern Prince of Wales Island and northwestern Somerset Island. Vivian Island lies to the southeast, and Binstead Island to the northeast.
