= List of shipwrecks in May 1851 =

The list of shipwrecks in May 1851 includes ships sunk, foundered, wrecked, grounded, or otherwise lost during May 1851.

== 1 May ==
List of shipwrecks: 1 May 1851
Ship	State	Description
Algerine	India	The brig was driven ashore and wrecked on the coast of Ceylon.
Asee	France	The barque was driven ashore and wrecked at San Francisco, California, United States.
Colombo	United Kingdom	The ship was driven ashore and wrecked at Colombo, Ceylon with the loss of seven of her crew. She was on a voyage from Colombo to London.
Delia Walker	United States	The ship was driven ashore and wrecked at San Francisco.
Nimrod	United Kingdom	The ship was driven ashore in the Dardanelles. She had been refloated by 7 May.
Pilita	Spain	The ship was wrecked on Key Biscayne, Florida, United States. Her crew were rescued. She was on a voyage from Havana, Cuba to Bilbao.
Sidatorre Carolina	India	The brig was driven ashore and wrecked on the coast of Ceylon.
Tinker	United Kingdom	The sloop capsized in a squall off Bo'ness, Lothian with the loss of a crew member.
Trio	United States	The ship ran aground on the Washerwoman Shoal. She was on a voyage from Island Harbor to Key West, Florida. She was refloated and taken in to Key West.
Zoe	India	The brig was driven ashore and wrecked on the coast of Ceylon.

== 2 May ==
List of shipwrecks: 2 May 1851
Ship	State	Description
Charles Forbes	India	The ship ran aground on the Pyramid Shoals, in the Strait of Malacca and was wrecked. Some of her crew were rescued by the paddle steamer Malta (United Kingdom). The remainder were subsequently rescued by HMS Amazon (Royal Navy). Charles Forbes was on a voyage from Bombay, India to China.
Felton Park	United Kingdom	The ship ran aground on the Little Burbo Bank, in Liverpool Bay. She was on a voyage from Constantinople, Ottoman Empire to Liverpool, Lancashire. She was refloated and completed her voyage.
Friendship	United Kingdom	The ship sprang a leak and was abandoned off the Farne Islands, Northumberland. She was on a voyage from Arbroath, Forfarshire to Newcastle upon Tyne, Northumberland. She was subsequently taken in to North Sunderland, County Durham.
Mars	United Kingdom	The steamship struck rocks and sank off Crail, Fife with the loss of two lives.
Marsden	United Kingdom	The ship sank in the North Sea off Saltfleet, Lincolnshire. Her crew were rescued. She was on a voyage from Newcastle upon Tyne to Maldon, Essex.
Webster	United States	The steamboat was destroyed by fire in the Mississippi River upstream of Vicksburg, Mississippi with the loss of 40 of the 100 people on board.

== 3 May ==
List of shipwrecks: 3 May 1851
Ship	State	Description
Isabella and Jane	United Kingdom	The ship was driven ashore 50 nautical miles (93 km) north of Bayonne, Basses-Pyrénées, France.
Jacques	(United Kingdom of Great Britain and Ireland) British North America	The brig was driven ashore on Janvrin Island, Nova Scotia. She was on a voyage from Havana, Cuba to Montreal and/or Quebec City, Province of Canada. She was refloated and resumed her voyage.
Vesta	Russia	The barque was driven ashore and damaged at Cardiff, Glamorgan, United Kingdom. She was on a voyage from Cardiff to Naples, Kingdom of the Two Sicilies. She was refloated on 22 May and taken in to Bristol, Gloucestershire, United Kingdom for repairs.

== 4 May ==
List of shipwrecks: 4 May 1851
Ship	State	Description
Chance	(United Kingdom of Great Britain and Ireland) Jersey	The ship was discovered abandoned in the Gulf of St Lawrence by Thomas Henry ( (United Kingdom of Great Britain and Ireland) ). A skeleton crew was put aboard and she was taken in to Quebec City, Province of Canada, British North America.
Fife	United Kingdom	The ship was in collision with a foreign brig and foundered in the English Channel 20 nautical miles (37 km) off Beachy Head, Sussex. Her crew were rescued by a Bermudan brig. She was on a voyage from Exeter, Devon to Newcastle upon Tyne, Northumberland.
Josephine	Norway	The barque was driven ashore near Sunderland, County Durham, United Kingdom.
Penrhyn Castle	United Kingdom	The flat was driven ashore and wrecked at Great Orme Head, Caernarfonshire. Her crew were rescued.
Phoenix	Russia	The ship was driven ashore near the Tolbukhin Lighthouse. She was on a voyage from Messina, Sicily to Saint Petersburg.
Sophie	Stettin	The ship was driven ashore east of Burnham Overy Staithe, Norfolk, United Kingdom. She was refloated on 13 May and taken in to Wells-next-the-Sea, Norfolk.
Totness	United Kingdom	The schooner was sunk by ice in the Atlantic Ocean. Her crew were rescued on 15 May, but six passengers were left on the ice. She was on a voyage from Plymouth, Devon to St. Anthony, Newfoundland.
Zieper Zaritza	Peru	The ship was driven ashore at Wexford, United Kingdom. She was on a voyage from Peru to Liverpool, Lancashire, United Kingdom. She was refloated on 7 May.

== 5 May ==
List of shipwrecks: 5 May 1851
Ship	State	Description
Amber	(United Kingdom of Great Britain and Ireland) British North America	The ship was wrecked in the Gut of Canso. Her crew were rescued. She was on a voyage from Prince Edward Island to Halifax, Nova Scotia.
Ellen	United Kingdom	The ship ran aground on the North Bank, in the Irish Sea off the coast of Lancashire. She was on a voyage from Glasgow, Renfrewshire to Liverpool, Lancashire.
Fife	United Kingdom	The schooner was in collision with a brig and sank in the English Channel 17 nautical miles (32 km) off Beachy Head, Sussex. Her six crew took to the jolly boat and were later rescued by the brig James ( (United Kingdom of Great Britain and Ireland) Bermuda). Fife was on a voyage from Seaton, Devon to Newcastle upon Tyne, Northumberland.
Peerless	United Kingdom	The ship was driven ashore at Alicante, Spain. She was on a voyage from Saint John's, Newfoundland, British North America to Cádiz and Alicante. She was refloated.
Sun	United Kingdom	The ship ran aground on the Race Horse Bank, off the coast of Massachusetts, United States. She was on a voyage from Sunderland, County Durham to Boston, Massachusetts. She was refloated and taken in to Boston in a leaky condition.

== 6 May ==
List of shipwrecks: 6 May 1851
Ship	State	Description
Falkland	India	The paddle steamer broke in two and sank 60 nautical miles (110 km) off Kurrachee with the loss of a crew member. Survivors were rescued by the paddle steamer Berenice ( India). Falkland was on a voyage from Bombay to Kurrachee.
Hoop	Netherlands	The ship was wrecked on Anegada, Virgin Islands. She was on a voyage from Rotterdam, South Holland to Puerto Rico.
Island Maid	United Kingdom	The ship was struck the Coal Rock, off the coast of Anglesey. She was on a voyage from Newport, Monmouthshire to Liverpool, Lancashire. She consequently put in to Amlwch, Anglesey.
Joss	United Kingdom	The ship was wrecked on the Swillies, in the Menai Strait. She was on a voyage from Porthdinllaen, Caernarfonshire to Runcorn, Cheshire.
Maria	Hamburg	The ship foundered in the North Sea with the loss of three of her four crew. She was on a voyage from Hamburg to Hull, Yorkshire, United Kingdom.
Sophia	United Kingdom	The ship was blown out to sea from Madras, India. No further trace, presumed foundered with the loss of all hands.

== 7 May ==
List of shipwrecks: 7 May 1851
Ship	State	Description
Sarah Ann	United States	The ship was driven ashore near "Westfleet". She was on a voyage from La Rochelle, Charente-Maritime to Boston, Massachusetts. She was refloated on 9 May and taken in to Boston.
Susanna	Hamburg	The ship sank off Ameland, Friesland, Netherlands. Her crew were rescued. She was on a voyage from Hamburg to Harlingen, Friesland.

== 8 May ==
List of shipwrecks: 8 May 1851
Ship	State	Description
Chebar	India	The ship ran aground on the Brouwers Shoal, off the coast of Sumatra, Netherlands East Indies. She was on a voyage from Hong Kong to London. She was refloated on 12 May and was towed in to Batavia, Netherlands East Indies on 14 May.
Jubilee	United Kingdom	The ship was in collision with Elizabeth (United Kingdom) in the North Sea and foundered. Her crew were rescued by Margaret and Jane (United Kingdom). Jubilee was on a voyage from London to Seaham, County Durham.
Jupiter	(Russian Empire) Grand Duchy of Finland	The ship was driven ashore 20 nautical miles (37 km) west of Málaga, Spain. She was on a voyage from Alexandria, Egypt to Liverpool, Lancashire, United Kingdom.

== 9 May ==
List of shipwrecks: 9 Maly 1851
Ship	State	Description
Jolly Tar	United Kingdom	The ship was wrecked on the Pamper Rock, in Bantry Bay with some loss of life.
Maria Louisa	Prussia	The brig foundered. Her crew were rescued. She was on a voyage from Livorno, Grand Duchy of Tuscany to Philadelphia, Pennsylvania, United States.
Wyke Regis	United Kingdom	The brig ran aground at Wilmington, North Carolina, United States. She was on a voyage from Cardiff, Glamorgan to Wilmington.

== 10 May ==
List of shipwrecks: 10 May 1851
Ship	State	Description
Broomielaw	United Kingdom	The ship was driven ashore at Garvan Point, County Antrim. She was on a voyage from Sligo to Newry, County Antrim.
Charles	United Kingdom	The schooner was driven ashore at Leba, Prussia. She was refloated and taken in to Leba.
Lucile	France	The ship was lost off Alderney, Channel Islands. Her crew were rescued. She was on a voyage from Morlaix, Finistère to Harfleur, Seine-Inférieure.

== 11 May ==
List of shipwrecks: 11 May 1851
Ship	State	Description
Harriet	(United Kingdom of Great Britain and Ireland) New South Wales	The cutter was driven ashore at Richmond, South Australia.

== 12 May ==
List of shipwrecks: 12 May 1851
Ship	State	Description
Ayrshire Lass	United Kingdom	The ship ran aground in the Douro. She was refloated and taken in to Porto, Portugal.
Scindian	United Kingdom	The ship ran aground on the Dean Sand, in the Solent. she was on a voyage from London to Saint Helena. She was refloated and taken in to Portsmouth, Hampshire.

== 13 May ==
List of shipwrecks: 13 May 1851
Ship	State	Description
Ariel	United Kingdom	The clipper was destroyed by fire off the mouth of the Hooghly River.
Star	United Kingdom	The schooner was wrecked on the Goodwin Sands, Kent. Her crew were rescued. She was on a voyage from Newcastle upon Tyne, Northumberland to Plymouth, Devon.

== 14 May ==
List of shipwrecks: 14 May 1851
Ship	State	Description
Centurion	United Kingdom	The ship ran aground at Helsingør, Denmark.
Genova	United Kingdom	The steamship collided with the paddle steamer Nimrod (United Kingdom) in the River Mersey and was severely damaged. She was taken into the Prince's Dock, Liverpool, Lancashire, United Kingdom, where she sank. All on board survived. She was on a voyage from Marseille, Bouches-du-Rhône, France to Liverpool.
Hector	Kingdom of Hanover	The sealer was sunk by ice off the coast of Greenland. Her crew were rescued.
HMS Sprightly	Royal Navy	The paddle steamer ran aground on the Kitchen Bank, in the Solent.

== 15 May ==
List of shipwrecks: 15 May 1851
Ship	State	Description
Amphitrite	(United Kingdom of Great Britain and Ireland) New South Wales	The schooner was driven ashore and wrecked at Shell Harbour. Her crew were rescued.
Ann	United Kingdom	The sloop sprang a leak and sank 5 nautical miles (9.3 km) off Anstruther, Fife.
Catharine	(United Kingdom of Great Britain and Ireland) New South Wales	The cutter was wrecked in the Bermagui River. Her crew were rescued.
Chameleon	Kingdom of Hawaii	The brig ran aground off Hanalei and was damaged. She was refloated, repaired and taken in to Honolulu.
Currency Lass	(United Kingdom of Great Britain and Ireland) New South Wales	The cutter was wrecked at Ulladulla.

== 16 May ==
List of shipwrecks: 16 May 1851
Ship	State	Description
Decision	United Kingdom	The brig ran aground on the Scroby Sands, Norfolk. She was on a voyage from Newcastle upon Tyne, Northumberland to Exeter, Devon. She was refloated and taken in to Great Yarmouth, Norfolk.
Flora	United Kingdom	The ship was driven ashore and capsized at Bridlington, Yorkshire. She was on a voyage from Seaham, County Durham to Sutton Bridge, Lincolnshire. She was righted the next day and beached before being refloated and taken in to Bridlington.
Mary White	United Kingdom	The barque was destroyed by fire in the Atlantic Ocean (37°02′N 39°30′W). All on board were rescued by the brig Preciosa (Russia). Mary White was on a voyage from Sydney, New South Wales to London.
Whitburn	United Kingdom	The brig was driven ashore at Bridlington. She was on a voyage from Sunderland, County Durham to London. She was refloated and resumed her voyage.

== 17 May ==
List of shipwrecks: 17 May 1851
Ship	State	Description
Falcon	(United Kingdom of Great Britain and Ireland) British North America	The steamship ran aground and sank on the Narrow Isle de Byro. All on board survived. She was on a voyage from St John's, Newfoundland to Halifax, Nova Scotia.
New Bedford	United States	The 351-ton whaling ship was wrecked in the Fox Islands near Umnak Island in the Aleutian Islands. Four members of her crew were lost while landing. Her remaining crew members were rescued by the ship Minerva Smyth (United States) on 30 May after rowing 40 nautical miles (74 km; 46 mi).
Seringapatam	United Kingdom	The ship was driven ashore at Portland, Dorset. She was on a voyage from Sydney, New South Wales to London. She was refloated.
Velocipede	United Kingdom	The brig was wrecked on or near Pratas Island. She was on a voyage from Singapore to Shanghai, China. Nine of her 31 crew reached Hong Kong in a boat. The rest were subsequently rescued by HMS Pilot (Royal Navy).

== 18 May ==
List of shipwrecks: 18 May 1851
Ship	State	Description
Bon Henri	France	The ship foundered in the Atlantic Ocean. Six crew were rescued on 31 May by Caroline Schenks (Flag unknown). Bon Henri was on a voyage from Patagonia, Argentina to Mauritius.
Flora	France	The schooner was driven ashore at Flamborough Head, Yorkshire, United Kingdom and was abandoned by her crew. She was later refloated and taken in to Bridlington, Yorkshire in a derelict condition.
Wheatburn	United Kingdom	The brig was driven ashore at Flamborough Head. She was refloated and resumed her voyage.

== 19 May ==
List of shipwrecks: 19 May 1851
Ship	State	Description
Calcutta	United States	The ship struck a sunken rock in the Strait of Gibraltar. She was on a voyage from Trieste to New York. She consequently put in to Gibraltar in a leaky condition.
Dolphin	Netherlands	The ship ran aground on the Pan Shoal. She was on a voyage from Batavia, Netherlands East Indies to Singapore. She was refloated and completed her voyage, arriving on 22 May.
Fortunio	United States	The ship was wrecked on a reef at "Waketo Oahec". She was on a voyage from Sydney, New South Wales to San Francisco, California.
Spray	United Kingdom	The brig ran aground on the Barber Sand, in the North Sea off the coast of Norfolk. She wason a voyage from Newcastle upon Tyne, Northumberland to London. She was refloated the next day and resumed her voyage.

== 20 May ==
List of shipwrecks: 20 May 1851
Ship	State	Description
Catherine	(United Kingdom of Great Britain and Ireland) New South Wales	The cutter was lost in the "Morurga River". Her crew were rescued.

== 21 May ==
List of shipwrecks: 21 May 1851
Ship	State	Description
Bernard	United Kingdom	The ship capsized in the North Sea. Her crew were rescued. She was on a voyage from Newcastle upon Tyne, Northumberland to Hamburg.
Courrier de Brest	United Kingdom	The ship was wrecked on the Pierre Perrées. Her crew survived. She was on a voyage from Blyth, Northumberland to Brest, Finistère.

== 22 May ==
List of shipwrecks: 23 May 1851
Ship	State	Description
Eamont	(United Kingdom of Great Britain and Ireland) Van Diemen's Land	The whaler, a barque, was wrecked on the coast of Japan. Her crew were rescued.

== 23 May ==
List of shipwrecks: 23 May 1851
Ship	State	Description
Alexander	United Kingdom	The brig was driven ashore at Nantucket, Massachusetts, United States. She was on a voyage from New York, United States to Saint John, New Brunswick, British North America. She was refloated on 26 May and taken in to Nantucket the next day.
Deslands	(United Kingdom of Great Britain and Ireland) New South Wales	The ship ran aground at Geelong, South Australia. She was on a voyage from Sydney to Geelong. She was refloated the next day and taken in to Geelong.
Zealous	(United Kingdom of Great Britain and Ireland) British North America	The ship was driven ashore in the Magdalen Islands, Nova Scotia.

== 25 May ==
List of shipwrecks: 25 May 1851
Ship	State	Description
Orient	(United Kingdom of Great Britain and Ireland) New South Wales	The schooner ran aground and was damaged at Melbourne. She was on a voyage from Sydney to the Manning River.She was refloated and taken in to Melbourne for repairs.
Princess Royal	United Kingdom	The ship ran aground at Appledore, Devon. She was on a voyage from Liverpool, Lancashire to Bremen. She was refloated and taken in to Appledore.

== 26 May ==
List of shipwrecks: 26 May 1851
Ship	State	Description
Admiral Bingham	United Kingdom	The ship ran aground and sank on the Felsand. Her crew were rescued. She was on a voyage from Hartlepool, County Durham to Kronstadt, Russia.

== 27 May ==
List of shipwrecks: 27 May 1851
Ship	State	Description
Courrier de Brest	France	The ship was driven ashore and sank near "Pierre Porcée". Her crew were rescued.

== 28 May ==
List of shipwrecks: 28 May 1851
Ship	State	Description
Fashion	(United Kingdom of Great Britain and Ireland) British North America	The ship was wrecked on Punto Mila, Cuba. Her crew were rescued. She was on a voyage from Martinique to Matanzas, Cuba.
Oscar	United Kingdom	The ship ran aground off Dieppe, Seine-Inférieure, France and was damaged. She was refloated.

== 29 May ==
List of shipwrecks: 29 May 1851
Ship	State	Description
Glide	United Kingdom	The ship was wrecked between Adra and Roquetas, Spain. Her crew were rescued. She was on a voyage from Newcastle upon Tyne, Northumberland to Galaţi, Ottoman Empire.

== 30 May ==
List of shipwrecks: 30 May 1851
Ship	State	Description
Georgina	United Kingdom	The ship was destroyed by fire in the Atlantic Ocean (38°36′N 10°25′W) with the loss of five of her seven crew. Survivors were rescued by the brig Espadarte (Portugal). Georgina was on a voyage from Portimão, Portugal to the Clyde.
Pioneer	(United Kingdom of Great Britain and Ireland) New South Wales	The brig was wrecked on the Cockburn Reef, in the Torres Strait. Her crew were rescued. She was on a voyage from Sydney to Booby Island.

== 31 May ==
List of shipwrecks: 31 May 1851
Ship	State	Description
Brothers	(United Kingdom of Great Britain and Ireland) British North America	The ship was wrecked on Marie Joseph Island. She was on a voyage from Pictou to Halifax, Nova Scotia.
Castor	United Kingdom	The ship was driven ashore and wrecked at Memel, Prussia. Her crew were rescued. She was on a voyage from Malmö, Sweden to Memel.
Fidelity	United Kingdom	The ship ran aground in the Victoria Channel. She was on a voyage from Liverpool, Lancashire to Drogheda, County Louth.
George Buckham	United Kingdom	The ship was wrecked on a reef in the Pacific Ocean. Duke of Roxburgh (United Kingdom) rescued her crew. George Buckham was on a voyage from Sydney, New South Wales to Hong Kong.
HMS Reynard	Royal Navy	HMS Reynard. The 8-gun screw sloop was wrecked on or near Pratas Island whilst going to the aid of Velocipede (United Kingdom). Her crew were rescued by HMS Pilot (Royal Navy).
Savannah	United States	The ship was destroyed by fire at Tyler, Texas. Her crew survived.
Snowdrop	United Kingdom	The ship ran aground on the Long Nose, off the north Kent coast. She was on a voyage from Youghal, County Cork to London. she was refloated on 15 June and taken in to Whitstable, Kent.

== Unknown date ==
List of shipwrecks: Unknown date in May 1851
Ship	State	Description
Adolphe Eugene	United Kingdom	The ship was driven ashore and wrecked near "Chassiron". She was on a voyage from Bordeaux, Gironde to Nantes, Loire-Inférieure.
Alice Haviland	United Kingdom	The ship ran ashore near Stavanger, Norway before 10 May. She was on a voyage from the Clyde to Saint Petersburg, Russia. She was refloated and resumed her voyage.
Ariel	United States	Heavy rains caused an earthen dam across the outlet to Geneva Lake in Wisconsin to break, resulting in a surge of water through the lake which swept the three-masted schooner several miles downstream. She suffered so much damage that she was abandoned in place and left to rot.
Britannia	United Kingdom	The brig was abandoned in the Atlantic Ocean before 17 May.
Dorothy	United Kingdom	The ship severely damaged at Saint-Valery-sur-Somme, Somme, France before 20 May. She was declared a total loss.
Emily	United Kingdom	The barque was wrecked in a typhoon at Madras, India.
Fourth of June	United States	The ship was abandoned in the Atlantic Ocean before 16 May.
Friendship	United Kingdom	The barque foundered in the Atlantic Ocean. Her crew were rescued by Dove (United Kingdom). Friendship was on a voyage from London to Valparaíso, Chile.
Gallinipper	United States	The 95-foot (29 m) trading schooner sank at the mouth of the Milwaukee River at Milwaukee, Wisconsin. She was refloated, repaired, and returned to service.
George Horne	United Kingdom	The ship foundered 200 nautical miles (370 km) west of Kangaroo Island, South Australia before 2 May. Her crew survived. She was on a voyage from Adelaide, South Australia to Swansea, Glamorgan.
Grace Darling	United Kingdom	The ship ran ashore near Stavanger before 10 May. She was on a voyage from Liverpool, Lancashire to Pillau, Prussia.
Hero	United Kingdom	The ship was wrecked on the Suadava Atoll. Her crew were rescued. She was on a voyage from Liverpool to Calcutta, India.
Hope	United Kingdom	The ship ran aground on the Florida Reef before 15 May.
Iona	United Kingdom	The ship foundered in the Atlantic Ocean before 29 May.
John Whiteley	United Kingdom	The ship was wrecked on a reef near "Plymouth" before 10 May. Her crew were rescued. She was on a voyage from Auckland, New Zealand to Sydney, New South Wales.
Joseph Yeoward	United Kingdom	The ship foundered with the loss of two of her crew. Survivors were rescued on 26 May by Champion (United Kingdom). Joseph Yeoward was on a voyage from Callao, Peru to Liverpool.
Mahoning	United States	The 119-foot (36 m) brigantine went aground at the Grand River in Lake Erie on the coast of the Province of Canada. She was refloated and returned to service.
Plenty	United Kingdom	The ship was driven ashore on the coast of Sweden before 14 May. She was on a voyage from Newcastle upon Tyne, Northumberland to Kronstadt, Russia. She was refloated and resumed her voyage.
Sarah	(United Kingdom of Great Britain and Ireland) British North America	The ship was destroyed by fire at Digby, Nova Scotia before 12 May.
Savannah	United States	The ship was destroyed by fire at "Tyber". All on board survived. She was on a voyage from Savannah, Georgia to New York.
Star	United Kingdom	The schooner was wrecked on the Goodwin Sands, Kent before 13 May. Her crew were rescued.
