= List of shipwrecks in January 1825 =

The list of shipwrecks in January 1825 includes some ships sunk, foundered, grounded, or otherwise lost during January 1825.

== 1 January ==
List of shipwrecks: 1 January 1825
Ship	State	Description
Diamond	United Kingdom	The ship ran aground in Cardigan Bay and consequently foundered between "Mocros" and Barmouth, Merionethshire with the loss of eight of the 38 people on board. She was on a voyage from New York, United States to Liverpool, Lancashire.
Hannah	(United Kingdom of Great Britain and Ireland) British North America	The ship was abandoned in the Atlantic Ocean. She was on a voyage from Saint John, New Brunswick to Liverpool, Lancashire.
Krym (Крым, 'Crimea')	Imperial Russian Navy	The corvette was driven ashore and wrecked at ru:Redut-Kale, a Russian fortress on the coast of Mingrelia, with the loss of 49 of her 128 crew.
Live Oak	United Kingdom	The ship was wrecked on Harbour Island, Bahamas. Her crew were rescued. She was on a voyage from Gibraltar to Havana, Cuba.

== 2 January ==
List of shipwrecks: 2 January 1825
Ship	State	Description
Clyde	(United Kingdom of Great Britain and Ireland) British North America	The ship was wrecked off Halifax, Nova Scotia. Her crew were rescued. She was on a voyage from Jamaica to Halifax.
Diamond	United States	The full-rigged ship was wrecked in Cardigan Bay. All on board were rescued. She was on a voyage from New York to Liverpool, Lancashire, United Kingdom.
Paxaso Verde	Gran Colombia	The ship capsized in a squall off Cartagena. Her crew were rescued. She was on a voyage from Cartagena to Omoa, British Honduras.

== 3 January ==
List of shipwrecks: 3 January 1825
Ship	State	Description
Diana	United Kingdom	The ship was driven ashore in Kingstowne Bay, Ireland.
Diomede	United States	The schooner was lost at Kitty Hawk, North Carolina.
Hannah	United Kingdom	The ship was abandoned in the Atlantic Ocean. She was on a voyage from Saint John, New Brunswick, British North America to Liverpool, Lancashire.
Louise Amalia	Denmark	The ship was lost near Thisted. She was on a voyage from Lisbon, Portugal to Copenhagen.

== 4 January ==
List of shipwrecks: 4 January 1825
Ship	State	Description
Britannia	India	The ship was wrecked on the Brill Shoal, off the Celebes Islands. She was on a voyage from Singapore to China.
Dove	United Kingdom	The ship was driven ashore and severely damaged at Dover, Kent. She was on a voyage from Bremen to St. Ubes, Portugal. Dove was later refloated and taken in to Dover.
Elbe Lightship	Hamburg	The lightship foundered with the loss of all six crew. A replacement vessel entered service on 10 January.
Forth	United Kingdom	The ship was wrecked on the Trinity Sand, in the North Sea off the coast of Yorkshire. She was on a voyage from Fraserburgh, Aberdeenshire to London.
Goodintent	United Kingdom	The ship was driven ashore on the west coast of Uist, Outer Hebrides. Her crew were rescued. She was on a voyage from Saint John, New Brunswick, British North America to Aberdeen.
John and Elizabeth	United Kingdom	The fishing smack was wrecked on Düne, Heligoland. Her crew were rescued. She was on a voyage from Harwich, Essex to Hamburg.
Leeds	United Kingdom	The ship ran aground in the River Mersey and became severely hogged. She was on a voyage from Liverpool, Lancashire to New York, United States.
Montagu	United Kingdom	The ship was driven ashore on Lindisfarne, Northumberland. She was on a voyage from Leith, Lothian to Hull, Yorkshire.
Pearl	United States	The ship was driven ashore and wrecked at Nantucket, Massachusetts. She was on a voyage from Puerto Rico to Boston, Massachusetts.
Phoenix	Netherlands	The brig was driven ashore at Audierne, Finistère, France.
Rochdale	United Kingdom	The ship was lost on the Niddings, in the North Sea off the coast of Denmark. Her crew were rescued.

== 5 January ==
List of shipwrecks: 5 January 1825
Ship	State	Description
Charles Walker	United Kingdom	The ship caught fire at Yorkshire and was scuttled.
Gulnare	United Kingdom	The ship was driven ashore at Liverpool, Lancashire. She was on a voyage from Virginia, United States to Liverpool.
Zuma	United Kingdom	The ship struck the Knowl Sandbank. She consequently foundered in the North Sea off Hollesley Bay, Suffolk. Her crew were rescued.

== 6 January ==
List of shipwrecks: 6 January 1825
Ship	State	Description
Courageux	France	The ship was driven ashore and wrecked near Tunis. All on board were rescued.
Zeemeuw	Netherlands	The ship was driven ashore 6 leagues (18 nautical miles (33 km)) west of Dunkirk, Nord, France and was abandoned by her crew. She was on a voyage from Amsterdam, North Holland to Havana, Cuba.

== 7 January ==
List of shipwrecks: 7 January 1825
Ship	State	Description
Albion	United Kingdom	The ship was driven ashore at Kenmore Point. She was on a voyage from Glasgow, Renfrewshire to Waterford.
Dove	United Kingdom	The ship ran aground in the River Thames at Deptford, Kent and was damaged. She was on a voyage from London to Smyrna and Constantinople, Ottoman Empire.
Fanny	France	The cutter was en route from Saint Malo to Jersey when she ran onto the rocks called Les Buts behind Elizabeth Castle. Thirteen passengers and crew were saved; the National Institution for the Preservation of Life from Shipwreck, which had been founded the previous year, awarded three gold medals and a silver medal in recognition of the bravery of their rescuers. Six passengers died.
Industry	United Kingdom	The ship was abandoned in the Atlantic Ocean. Her crew were rescued by Amazon (France) before she foundered. Industry was on a voyage from Mogadore, Morocco to London.
Triton	Bremen	The ship ran aground on the Langlutzen Sand. She was on a voyage from Bordeaux, Gironde, France to Bremen.

== 8 January ==
List of shipwrecks: 8 January 1825
Ship	State	Description
Patriot	United Kingdom	The ship was wrecked in the Pentland Firth with the loss of eight of her crew.

== 10 January ==
List of shipwrecks: 10 January 1825
Ship	State	Description
Agamemnon	United Kingdom	The ship struck a rock at Buenos Aires, Argentina and was beached. She was declared a total loss.
Vigilant	United Kingdom	The ship was wrecked on the Goodwin Sands, Kent. Her crew survived. She was on a voyage from Swanage, Dorset to London.

== 11 January ==
List of shipwrecks: 11 January 1825
Ship	State	Description
Adeona	United Kingdom	The ship was driven ashore in the River Shannon. She was on a voyage from Limerick to Liverpool, Lancashire. She was refloated on 5 February.
William & Kara	United States	The ship was wrecked on the south east point of Bonaire. Her crew were rescued. She was on a voyage from New York to Curaçao.

== 13 January ==
List of shipwrecks: 13 January 1825
Ship	State	Description
Mathilde	Hamburg	The ship was wrecked at Cuxhaven. She was on a voyage from Newcastle upon Tyne, Northumberland, United Kingdom to Hamburg.
Success	United Kingdom	The sloop was wrecked in Arniel Bay with the loss of fourteen of the 26 people on board. She was on a voyage from Belfast, County Antrim to the River Kelvin.

== 14 January ==
List of shipwrecks: 14 January 1825
Ship	State	Description
Friends	United Kingdom	The ship was driven ashore and wrecked at Newry, County Antrim. She was on a voyage from Dublin to Belfast, County Antrim.
Good Intent	United Kingdom	The ship was driven ashore and wrecked on South Uist, Outer Hebrides. She was on a voyage from Saint John, New Brunswick, British North America to Aberdeen.
Minerva	United Kingdom	The ship was damaged in a hurricane in the Pacific Ocean. She put into Otaheite, where she was condemned.

== 15 January ==
List of shipwrecks: 15 January 1825
Ship	State	Description
Joseph and Son	United Kingdom	The ship was driven ashore and wrecked between Ardrossan and Saltcoats, Ayrshire. Her crew were rescued. She was on a voyage from Coleraine, County Antrim to Greenock, Renfrewshire.
Sisters	United Kingdom	The ship was driven ashore in Kioge Bay. She was on a voyage from Memel, Prussia to Hull, Yorkshire. Sisters was later refloated and taken in to Copenhagen, Denmark.
Vigilant	United Kingdom	The ship ran aground on the Goodwin Sands, Kent and was abandoned by her crew. She was on a voyage from Swanage, Dorset to London. Vigilant was refloated but consequently foundered.

== 16 January ==
List of shipwrecks: 16 January 1825
Ship	State	Description
Myrtle	United Kingdom	The ship ran aground on the Whiting Sand, in the North Sea. She was on a voyage from Newcastle upon Tyne, Northumberland to London. Myrtle was refloated but was consequently beached at Orfordness, Suffolk.

== 17 January ==
List of shipwrecks: 17 January 1825
Ship	State	Description
Ann Elizabeth	United Kingdom	The ship departed from Leith, Lothian for Lerwick, Shetland Islands. No further trace, presumed foundered in the North Sea with the loss of all hands.
James Fitzpatrick	United Kingdom	The ship was driven ashore near Southport, Lancashire.
Prince Regent	United Kingdom	The ship was driven ashore at Penzance, Cornwall. She was on a voyage from London to Jersey, Channel Islands. Prince Regent was refloated the next day and taken in to Penzance.
Rachel	United Kingdom	The ship was driven ashore and wrecked at Terceira, Azores, Portugal.
Shillelagh	United Kingdom	The ship was driven ashore at Kirkcudbright. She was on a voyage from Belfast, County Antrim to Workington, Cumberland.

== 18 January ==
List of shipwrecks: 18 January 1825
Ship	State	Description
Amitie	United Kingdom	The ship was driven ashore and wrecked at Penzance, Cornwall, United Kingdom with the loss of two of her crew. She was on a voyage from Marseille, Bouches-du-Rhône to Rouen, Seine-Inférieure.
Amity	United Kingdom	The ship was driven ashore at Milford Haven, Pembrokeshire. She was on a voyage from Southampton, Hampshire to Bangor. Amity had been refloated by 22 January.
Ann	United Kingdom	The ship struck a sandbank in the North Sea off Lowestoft, Suffolk and foundered. She was on a voyage from South Shields, County Durham to London.
British Oak	United Kingdom	The ship was driven ashore and wrecked near Port Kiln, Argyllshire. She was on a voyage from Greenock to Chester, Cheshire.
Ceres	United Kingdom	The ship was driven ashore and severely damaged at Clayandown, Cornwall. Her crew were rescued. She was refloated on 21 January and towed in to Penzance, Cornwall.
Commerce	United Kingdom	The ship was driven ashore in the Clyde west of Helensburgh, Dunbartonshire. She was on a voyage from Greenock, Renfrewshire to Charleston, South Carolina, United States. Commerce was later refloated.
Dale	United Kingdom	The ship was driven ashore in Loch Indaal.
Deveron	United Kingdom	The ship was driven ashore north of the mouth of the River Don, Aberdeenshire with the loss of a crew member.
Dorset	United Kingdom	The ship struck a sandbank in the North Sea off Lowestoft and foundered with the loss of all but two of her crew. The survivors were rescued by the Lowestoft Lifeboat. Dorset was on a voyage from Rotterdam, South Holland, Netherlands to London.
Harriet & John	United Kingdom	The ship struck a sandbank in the North Sea off Lowestoft and foundered. She was on a voyage from Sunderland, County Durham to London.
Hebe	United Kingdom	The ship was driven ashore and wrecked at Orfordness, Suffolk. Her crew were rescued. She was on a voyage from Rotterdam to London.
Isabella	United Kingdom	The ship collided with HMRC New Charter ( Board of Customs) off Harwich, Essex and foundered. Her crew were rescued by Prince of Saxe Coburg (United Kingdom). Isabella was on a voyage from Sunderland to London.
John	United Kingdom	The ship departed from Riga, Russia for a Norwegian port. No further trace, presumed foundered in the Baltic Sea with the loss of all hands.
Lord Kinsale	United Kingdom	The ship was driven ashore on the west coast of South Uist, Outer Hebrides with the loss of four of her crew. She was on a voyage from Tralee, County Kerry to Liverpool, Lancashire.
Louisa	Danzig	The ship was sighted in the Øresund whilst on a voyage from Danzig to Londonderry, United Kingdom. No further trace, presumed foundered with the loss of all hands.
Maria Eliza	United Kingdom	The ship was driven ashore at Milford Haven. She was on a voyage from Cardiff, Glamorgan to London. Maria Eliza had been refloated by 22 January.
Menai	United Kingdom	The sloop foundered in the River Loughor with the loss of all hands.
Orion	United Kingdom	The ship was wrecked at the mouth of the River Lune. Her crew were rescued. She was on a voyage from Liverpool to Cork and Jamaica.
Prince of Brazil	United Kingdom	The ship was driven ashore on Saltholm, Denmark. She was on a voyage from Memel, Prussia to Grangemouth, Stirlingshire. Prince of Brazil was later refloated and taken in to Helsingør, Denmark.
Prosperous	United Kingdom	The ship ran aground on the Newcombe Sand, in the English Channel. She floated off but consequently foundered. Her crew were rescued. Prosperous was on a voyage from London to Dublin. She was refloated in mid-February and taken in to Ramsgate, Kent, where she arrived on 18 February.
Renown	United Kingdom	The ship struck a sandbank in the North Sea off Lowestoft and foundered. Her crew were rescued. She was on a voyage from South Shields to London.
Sir William Wallace	United Kingdom	The steam ferryboat broke her moorings at Burntisland, Fife, Scotland, in a gale and became a total wreck (no casualties).

== 19 January ==
List of shipwrecks: 19 January 1825
Ship	State	Description
Ajax	United Kingdom	The ship was driven onto rocks at "Brackstel", Denmark and damaged. She was on a voyage from "Wyburg" to Hull, Yorkshire.
Expedition	United Kingdom	The ship was driven ashore and wrecked at Boulogne-sur-Mer, Pas-de-Calais, France. She was on a voyage from Seville, Spain to London.
Happy Return	United Kingdom	The ship was wrecked at Aberffraw, Anglesey.
Henry Addington	United Kingdom	The ship was lost on the coast of Norway.
Hebe	United Kingdom	The ship was wrecked at Orford Ness, Suffolk. Her crew were rescued. She was on a voyage from Rotterdam, South Holland, Netherlands to London.
Loft	United Kingdom	The ship was driven ashore and wrecked at "Hammersound". She was on a voyage from Memel, Prussia to Hull, Yorkshire.
William Wise	United Kingdom	The ship was driven ashore and wrecked near Liverpool, Lancashire. She was on a voyage from Demerara to Liverpool.

== 20 January ==
List of shipwrecks: 20 January 1825
Ship	State	Description
Ardent	United Kingdom	The ship was driven ashore at Mockbeggar, Cheshire. She was on a voyage from Liverpool, Lancashire to Maranhão, Brazil. Ardent was refloated the next day.
Mary	United Kingdom	The whaler was wrecked on Jarvis Island. The whalers Francis and Vansittart rescued the crew six weeks later.

== 22 January ==
List of shipwrecks: 22 January 1825
Ship	State	Description
Christina Kerstina	Hamburg	The ship departed from Hamburg for London, United Kingdom. No further trace, presumed foundered in the North Sea with the loss of all hands.
Collings	United Kingdom	The ship was wrecked on Sand Hale, in the North Sea off the coast of Yorkshire with the loss of two on her four crew. She was on a voyage from Newcastle upon Tyne, Northumberland to Brancaster, Norfolk.
Donegal	United Kingdom	The ship was driven ashore at Dundalk, County Louth.
Emulous	United States	The schooner was lost at Kitty Hawk, North Carolina.
Goede Verwachting	Duchy of Holstein	The ship departed from Tönningen for Grimsby, Lincolnshire, United Kingdom. No further trace, presumed foundered in the North Sea with the loss of all hands.
Hope	United Kingdom	The ship was wrecked on The Skerries, Anglesey. She was on a voyage from Liverpool, Lancashire to Holyhead, Anglesey.
Queensferry	United Kingdom	The ship was driven ashore near Mockbeggar, Cheshire. She was on a voyage from Dumfries to Liverpool.
Richard Plaskett	United Kingdom	The ship was wrecked on the Lemon and Ower Sand, in the North Sea off the coast of Suffolk with the loss of a crew member. Survivors were rescued by a Russian vessel. She was on a voyage from Hamburg to London.
Velocipede	United Kingdom	The ship capsized with the loss of two of her crew. She was on a voyage from New York to La Guayra, Gran Colombia.
Washington	United States	The ship was driven ashore at Ocracoke, North Carolina. She was on a voyage from Jamaica to Plymouth, Massachusetts.

== 23 January ==
List of shipwrecks: 23 January 1825
Ship	State	Description
Amity	United Kingdom	The ship struck the pier at Ramsgate, Kent and was severely damaged. She was on a voyage from London to Bombay, India.
Glory	(United Kingdom of Great Britain and Ireland) Gibraltar	The ship was driven ashore and wrecked at Gibraltar. Her crew were rescued. She was on a voyage from Genoa, Kingdom of Sardinia to Gibraltar.
Margaretha	Netherlands	The ship foundered in the North Sea off Vlieland, Friesland with the loss of all hands.

== 24 January ==
List of shipwrecks: 24 January 1825
Ship	State	Description
Active	United States	The brig was driven ashore at Gibraltar. Her crew were rescued.
Catharine	United Kingdom	The brig was lost on Cape St. Thome. She was on a voyage from Rio de Janeiro, Brazil to a Mediterranean port.
Cririe	United States	The ship was driven ashore at Porthscaden, Caernarfonshire, United Kingdom. Her crew were rescued. She was on a voyage from Charleston, South Carolina to Liverpool, Lancashire, United Kingdom. She broke up on 2 February.
Superior	United States	The ship was abandoned in the Gulf of Mexico. She was on a voyage from the Kennebec River to Antigua.
Wilhelmina	Sweden	The ship was lost at Falkenberg. She was on a voyage from Stockholm to London, United Kingdom.

== 25 January ==
List of shipwrecks: 25 January 1825
Ship	State	Description
Amitie	France	The brig was driven ashore near Marazion, Cornwall, United Kingdom with the loss of two of her crew. She was on a voyage from Marseille, Bouches-du-Rhône to Havre de Grâce, Seine-Inférieure.
Jane	United Kingdom	The ship was wrecked 12 nautical miles (22 km) from entrance to the Bosporus. There were at least eight survivors. She was on a voyage from Odesa to Bristol, Gloucestershire.
Speedwell	United Kingdom	The ship sprang a leak in the Atlantic Ocean off Tenerife, Canary Islands, Spain and was abandoned by her crew. She was on a voyage from London to New Orleans, Louisiana, United States.

== 26 January ==
List of shipwrecks: 26 January 1825
Ship	State	Description
Broughton Tower	United Kingdom	The ship was driven ashore north of Harrington, Cumberland. She was on a voyage from Newry, County Antrim to Liverpool, Lancashire. Broughton Tower was refloated on 1 February and taken in to Harrington.
Eliza	United Kingdom	The ship was driven ashore at Wicklow. She was on a voyage from Dungarvan, County Waterford to Bristol, Gloucestershire.
Henry	United Kingdom	The ship was driven ashore north of Harrington. She was on a voyage from Liverpool to Dublin. Henry was refloated on 1 February and taken in to Harrington.
Margaretha	Netherlands	The ship foundered in the North Sea off Vlieland, Friesland with the loss of all hands.
Maria de Bon Felicade	Portugal	The schooner was abandoned in the Atlantic Ocean. Her crew were rescued by Margaret (United Kingdom). She was on a voyage from "Fago" to the Cape Verde Islands.
Nancy	United Kingdom	The sloop foundered in the Irish Sea 2 nautical miles (3.7 km) east of Carlingford, County Louth with the loss of all hands.
Susan and Caroline	United Kingdom	The ship was run down and sunk in the North Sea off Cromer, Norfolk.
Thomas	United Kingdom	The ship was driven ashore at Maryport, Cumberland.
Wasp	United Kingdom	The ship was driven ashore and severely damaged at Arbroath, Forfarshire. She was on a voyage from Riga, Russia to Arbroath. Wasp was refloated on 29 January and taken in to Arbroath.

== 27 January ==
List of shipwrecks: 27 January 1825
Ship	State	Description
Carrier	United Kingdom	The ship was driven ashore at Rochidan, Isle of Bute. All on board survived. She was on a voyage from Newry, County Antrim to Glasgow, Renfrewshire. Carrier was refloated on 22 February and taken in to Greenock, Renfrewshire.
Eliza	United Kingdom	The ship was driven ashore at Wicklow. She was on a voyage from Dungarvan, County Waterford to Bristol, Gloucestershire.
Friendship	United Kingdom	The ship collided with at collier in Filey Bay and foundered. Her crew were rescued. She was on a voyage from Sunderland, County Durham to King's Lynn, Norfolk.
Letitia Tennent	United Kingdom	The ship was driven ashore at Stromness, Orkney Islands. She was on a voyage from Riga, Russia to Belfast, County Antrim.
Margaret	United Kingdom	The ship was driven ashore and wrecked on Brassay, Shetland Islands.
Neptune	United Kingdom	The ship was driven ashore in Scapa Flow, Orkney Islands. She was on a voyage from Saint Petersburg, Russia to Bristol, Gloucestershire.
Thistle	United Kingdom	The ship was in collision with another vessel and sank in Filey Bay. Her crew were rescued. She was on a voyage from Sunderland, County Durham to King's Lynn, Norfolk.

== 28 January ==
List of shipwrecks: 28 January 1825
Ship	State	Description
Atlas	United Kingdom	The ship was driven ashore at Hurst Castle, Hampshire. She was on a voyage from Youghall, County Cork to Southampton, Hampshire. Atlas was refloated on 2 February and resumed her voyage.
Catharine Green	United Kingdom	The ship ran aground off the coast of Sierra Leone. She had been refloated by 13 February.
Mentor	Netherlands East Indies	The barque capsized and sank in the Straits of Malacca with the loss of 34 of the 40 people on board. She was on a voyage from Mauritius to Batavia.

== 31 January ==
List of shipwrecks: 31 January 1825
Ship	State	Description
Magnet	United States	The ship was driven ashore and wrecked at Galway, United Kingdom. She was on a voyage from Philadelphia, Pennsylvania to Liverpool, Lancashire, United Kingdom.

== Unknown date ==
List of shipwrecks: Unknown date in January 1825
Ship	State	Description
Aimable Victoire	France	The ship was wrecked near Quinéville, Manche in late January. She was on a voyage from Dunkirk, Nord to Bordeaux, Gironde.
Arbon	Stettin	The ship was driven ashore near Bovenbergen, Denmark. She was on a voyage from Stettin to London, United Kingdom.
Ariathea Bell	United States	The ship was lost near Matanzas, Cuba. Her crew were rescued. She was on a voyage from Baltimore, Maryland to Havana, Cuba.
Betsey	United States	The ship was wrecked on the Double Headed Shot Keys. All but one of her crew were murdered by pirates. She was on a voyage from Wiscasset, Maine to Matanzas, Cuba.
British Oak	United Kingdom	The schooner was driven ashore at "Portkiln". She was on a voyage from Greenock, Renfrewshire to Chester, Cheshire.
Despatch	(United Kingdom of Great Britain and Ireland) British North America	The ship was lost off the Outer Hebrides in mid-January. She was on a voyage from Saint John, New Brunswick to Sligo.
Emmelle	France	The ship was driven ashore near "Kanso". She was on a voyage from Härnösand, Sweden to Havre de Grâce, Seine-Inférieure.
Esperance	France	The ship foundered in the English Channel off Boulogne, Pas-de-Calais in late January.
Gute Hoffnung	Hamburg	The ship was lost in the Eider. She was on a voyage from Bordeaux, Gironde, France to Hamburg.
Harmony	United Kingdom	The ship was driven ashore at Glenelg, Ross-shire. She was on a voyage from London to Widewall, Orkney Islands.
Henrietta	Danzig	The ship struck rocks and sank at Christiansø, Denmark. She was on a voyage from Danzig to Newcastle upon Tyne.
Hero	United Kingdom	The ship was driven ashore in Luce Bay.
Hope	United Kingdom	The ship was wrecked off Whitehaven, Cumberland. Her crew were rescued. She was on a voyage from Maryport to Carlisle, Cumberland.
Industry	United Kingdom	The ship was abandoned at sea. She was on a voyage from Mogadore, Morocco to London. Her crew were rescued by a French brig.
James	United Kingdom	The ship was driven ashore at Marstrand, Sweden.
Jane	United Kingdom	The ship foundered off Skagen, Denmark on or before 5 January.
Jane	United Kingdom	The ship was wrecked in the Black Sea near the entrance to the Bosphorus. At least eight of her crew survived. She was on a voyage from Odesa to Bristol, Gloucestershire.
Jeune Louise	France	The ship foundered in the English Channel off Boulogne in late January.
Leander	United Kingdom	The ship was wrecked at "Galeen".
Lord Nelson	United Kingdom	The ship was wrecked on the "Island of Yzars", east of Cape Machichaco, Spain between 18 and 23 January with the loss of all but two of her crew. She was on a voyage from Newfoundland, British North America to Bilbao, Spain.
Margareta Dorothea	Netherlands	The ship was wrecked before 20 January. She was on a voyage from Great Yarmouth, Norfolk, United Kingdom to Ostend, West Flanders.
Mary	France	The ship foundered off Saint Domingue. She was on a voyage from Saint Dominguen to Havre de Grâce.
Mercator	flag unknown	The ship was wrecked near Libava, Courland Governorate. Her crew were rescued.
Princess Charlotte	United Kingdom	The ship was wrecked off Ballyteague, County Kildare. She was on a voyage from Smyrna, Ottoman Empire to Liverpool, Lancashire.
Queensbury	United Kingdom	The ship was driven ashore at Mockbeggar, Cheshire.
Rebecca	United Kingdom	The ship foundered in Carnarvon Bay. She was on a voyage from Greenock to Jamaica.
Starling	United Kingdom	The ship was driven ashore at Smyrna, Ottoman Empire between 28 and 31 January.
Theresa	Danzig	The ship was lost whilst on a voyage from Danzig to London.
Trader	United Kingdom	The ship departed from Liverpool for Dunmore, County Galway. No further trace, presumed foundered with the loss of all hands.
Wilhelmina	Bremen	The ship was driven ashore on the "Hogenweg". She was on a voyage from Havana, Cuba to Bremen. Wilhelmina was later refloated and put into Bremen.
