= Four Rivers Bay =

Bay in Nunavut, Canada

- Location within Nunavut
- Location: Peel Sound
- Coordinates: 72°45′N 95°37′W
- Ocean/sea sources: Arctic Ocean
- Basin countries: Canada
- Settlements: Uninhabited

Four Rivers Bay is an Arctic waterway in the Qikiqtaaluk Region, Nunavut, Canada. It is located in Peel Sound on the western side of Somerset Island. It is 28 km (17 mi) west of the permanently frozen Stanwell-Fletcher Lake.
