= Peel Sound =

Waterway in Nunavut, Canada

- Location within Nunavut
- Coordinates: 73°00′N 096°30′W
- Basin countries: Canada
- Settlements: Uninhabited

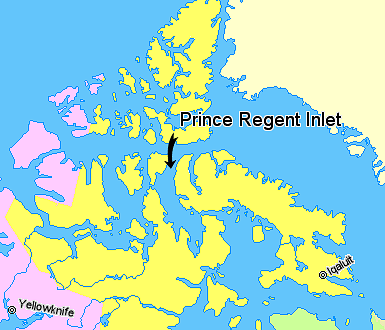
Peel Sound is the next inlet west of Prince Regent Inlet

Peel Sound is an Arctic waterway in the Qikiqtaaluk, Nunavut, Canada. It separates Somerset Island on the east from Prince of Wales Island on the west. To the north it opens onto Parry Channel while its southern end merges with Franklin Strait.

There are several named islands within the sound, including: Lock, Vivian, Prescott, Pandora, Otrick, Barth, De la Roquette, and Gibson.

Sir John Franklin passed through the strait in 1846 during an unseasonably warm summer, since typically Peel Sound is frozen. Its east side was traced by James Clark Ross in 1849. In 1858 Francis Leopold McClintock tried to penetrate it and was blocked by ice.
